= Taishan Station (Antarctica) =

Chinese research station in Antarctica

Taishan Station 泰山站
- Antarctic base
- Location of Taishan Station in Antarctica
- Coordinates: 73°51′50″S 76°58′27″E
- Country: China
- Location in Antarctica: Princess Elizabeth Land; Antarctica
- Administered by: Polar Research Institute of China
- Established: 8 February 2014
- Elevation: 2,621 m (8,599 ft)

Population (2017)
  - Summer: 20
  - Winter: 0
- Type: Seasonal
- Period: Summer
- Status: Operational
- Activities: List: Glaciology; Meteorology
- Website: Chinese Arctic and Antarctic Administration

Taishan Station
- Interactive map of the Taishan Station area

General information
- Type: Research station
- Location: Princess Elizabeth Land, East Antarctica
- Elevation: 2,621 m
- Construction started: December 26, 2013
- Completed: February 8, 2014

Technical details
- Floor area: 1,000 m^{2}

Other information
- Seating capacity: 20 people

Taishan Station (Chinese: 泰山站; pinyin: Tàishān Zhàn) is the fourth of the five Chinese research stations in Antarctica.

Officially opened on February 8, 2014, it is the fourth Chinese research station in Antarctica following Great Wall, Zhongshan and Kunlun stations. The fifth, Qinling, followed in February 2024.

The site is located 2,621 m above sea level in Princess Elizabeth Land, 522 km and 600 km to Zhongshan and Kunlun stations respectively. One of its functions is to serve as a relay point between the two stations.

The construction started on December 26, 2013. The station's main building covers an area of 410 m^{2}, together with the auxiliary building covering 590 m^{2}, provide the living and researching area for 20 people during the Antarctic summer.

== See also ==
- Antarctic Great Wall Station
- Antarctic Kunlun Station
- Antarctic Zhongshan Station
- Qinling Station
- Arctic Yellow River Station
- List of Antarctic field camps
- List of Antarctic research stations
- Polar Research Institute of China
- Xue Long and Xue Long 2
