= Chinese Arctic and Antarctic Administration =

Chinese government body

- 国家海洋局极地考察办公室
- Abbreviation: CAA
- Formation: 1981; 45 years ago
- Purpose: Organizes, coordinates, and supervises China's polar program
- Headquarters: No.1 Fuxingmenwai Ave. 10086, Beijing, China
- Director: Qu Tanzhou (曲探宙)
- Parent organization: State Oceanic Administration
- Affiliations: International Arctic Research Center; International Arctic Science Committee
- Website: chinare.mnr.gov.cn

The Chinese Arctic and Antarctic Administration, often abbreviated as the CAA (previously the Chinese Antarctic Administration of the State Antarctic Research Committee), is a Beijing-based agency of the People's Republic of China's State Oceanic Administration (SOA). Established in 1981, it organizes China's scientific program for both the Arctic and Antarctic, and it provides logistic support to Antarctic expeditions. There are several divisions, including General Affairs, Operation & Logistics, Science Programs, International Cooperation, representation in the Chinese Embassy in Chile, and a Winter Training Base. The director is Qu Tanzhou.

The CAA organizes, coordinates, and supervises China's polar program. As such, its responsibilities include: developing an integrated national polar research strategy, developing policy to guide national polar research activities, developing a five-year plan which coordinates the national policy, updating the national polar plan on an annual basis, coordinating the annual national polar research expedition, promoting coordination of polar research programs with other agencies, and supporting polar research cooperation with other nations and international organizations.

The CAA is affiliated with the International Arctic Research Center, and the International Arctic Science Committee.

== Projects ==
A 2006 Shanghai Daily news report stated that Chinese scientists would begin naming 46 newly surveyed, anonymous Antarctic islands and that the CAA, with its teammate Sina.com, would collect candidate names. From 2007 through 2009, the CAA organized a government-sponsored research project to enhance its understanding of the legal, military, and political issues associated with the Arctic. The agency also operates a winter training base at Yabuli Ski Resort in the northern province of Heilongjiang.

The International Polar Year 2007-2008 China Programme included a partnership between the International Polar Foundation, the CCA, and the Polar Research Institute of China. This included the participation of Jean de Pomereu, reporter and photographer, in the 25th CHINARE Expedition late in the year in 2008. He traveled aboard the Chinese icebreaker, Xue Long ("Snow Dragon"), then reported from China's east Antarctic research station, Antarctic Zhongshan Station. The expedition team sent by the CAA was also entrusted with starting construction of the Antarctic Kunlun Station, China's third Antarctic station.

Xue Long, China's first polar research icebreaker, was purchased in 1993 from Ukraine, and has made 24 research expeditions to the Antarctic and three to the Arctic. In 2009, the CAA began planning for a Chinese-built icebreaker due to China's expanding polar exploration activities. The ship, named Xue Long 2, was laid down in 2016 and was expected to enter service in 2019.

== See also ==
- Arctic policy of China
- Arctic Yellow River Station
- Guo Kun, former director
