= Kunlun Station =

Chinese research station in eastern Antarctica

Kunlun Station 昆仑站
- Antarctic base
- Location of Kunlun Station in Antarctica
- Coordinates: 80°25′02″S 77°06′58″E
- Country: China
- Location in Antarctica: East Antarctica
- Administered by: Polar Research Institute of China
- Established: 27 January 2009
- Elevation: 4,087 m (13,409 ft)

Population (2017)
  - Summer: 26
  - Winter: 0
- Type: Seasonal
- Period: Summer
- Status: Operational
- Activities: List: Core drilling; Astronomy; Geomagnetism; Seismology
- Website: Chinese Arctic and Antarctic Administration

Kunlun Station (simplified Chinese: 昆仑站; traditional Chinese: 崑崙站; pinyin: Kūnlún Zhàn) is the southernmost of five Chinese research stations in Antarctica. When it is occupied during the summer, it is the second-southernmost research base in Antarctica, behind only the American Amundsen–Scott South Pole Station at the geographical South Pole. When Kunlun is not in operation, the year-round Russian Vostok Station is the second-southernmost base in Antarctica.

It is located at 4087 m above sea level on the East Antarctic Ice Sheet, making it the highest base in Antarctica. It is only 7.3 km southwest of Dome A, the highest point on the Antarctic Plateau. The station was officially opened on January 27, 2009. Fully constructed, the station is planned to cover an area of 558 m^{2}. The main building, covering 236 m^{2}, is planned to be erected in April 2009.

The site is one of the coldest in the world, with temperatures occasionally reaching −80 °C (−112 °F) in the winter. It is indicated from satellite measurements that places nearby could reach a world record −90 °C (−130 °F) temperature.

In April 2012 the first of three Antarctica Schmidt telescopes (AST3) was installed at Kunlun Station. The other two were planned for installation in 2013 and 2014. A bigger optical telescope, Kunlun Dark Universe Survey Telescope (KDUST), was planned to be installed by 2025, but due to budget constraints the plans were scrapped. A much smaller terahertz telescope, Antarctic Terahertz Explorer (ATE60), was built instead and is currently in operation.

== Telescopes at Kunlun Station ==
Instrument Name	Aperture	Installation Year	Remarks
Chinese Small Telescope Array (CSTAR)	0.145m	2008	CSTAR is an array of four Schmidt telescope with aperture of 14.5 cm, equipped with 1Kx1K CCD each.
Antarctica Schmidt telescopes (AST3)	0.5m	2012–2014	First of three AST3 telescopes was installed at the Antarctic Kunlun Station in April 2012.
Kunlun Dark Universe Survey Telescope (KDUST)	2.5m	2025 (suspended)	KDUST was a planned 2.5 meter infrared optical telescope designed to detect and observe Earth-like planets in the Milky Way using infrared light. Due to budget constraints and logistical issues, construction was suspended indefinitely.
Dome A Terahertz Explorer-5 (DATE5)	5m	2025 (suspended)	DATE5 was a 5-meter telescope designed to detect light with longer wavelengths, which would allow astronomers to detect and observe nascent stars. Due to budget constraints and logistical issues, construction was suspended indefinitely.
Antarctic Terahertz Explorer (ATE60)	60 cm	2026	ATE60 is a small prototype terahertz telescope.
Infrared optical telescope	6-8m	2020+	

== See also ==
- List of Antarctic research stations
- List of Antarctic field camps
- Antarctic Great Wall Station
- Antarctic Zhongshan Station
- Antarctic Taishan Station
- Arctic Yellow River Station
- Polar Research Institute of China
- Xue Long and Xue Long 2
