= Polar Research Institute of China =

Chinese research institute for the study of the Earth's polar regions

- 中国极地研究中心
- Type: Research institute
- Headquarters: Shanghai
- Parent organization: Ministry of Natural Resources
- Website: www.pric.org.cn

The Polar Research Institute of China is the main state research institute of the People's Republic of China for the study of Earth's polar regions. The PRIC is an agency within China's Ministry of Natural Resources and conducts polar scientific research, polar observation, and scientific expeditions. It is based in Shanghai, China.

The Institute manages six polar research stations (five in Antarctica and one in the Arctic), and jointly operates the China-Iceland Arctic Science Observatory (CIAO) with the Icelandic Centre for Research (Rannis). The PRIC operates the icebreaking research vessels Xue Long and Xue Long 2.

== Stations ==
Antarctic stations
Station	Location	Date of establishment	Accommodation
Great Wall Station	King George Island	20 February 1985	80 summer, 40 winter
Zhongshan Station	Larsemann Hills, Princess Elizabeth Land	26 January 1989	60 summer, 25 winter
Kunlun Station	Dome Argus, Princess Elizabeth Land	27 January 2009	24 summer
Taishan Station	Princess Elizabeth Land	8 February 2014	20 summer
Qinling Station	Inexpressible Island, Ross Sea	7 February 2024	80 summer, 30 winter
Arctic stations
Station	Location	Date of establishment	Accommodation
Yellow River Station	Ny-Ålesund, Svalbard, Norway	28 July 2004	staffed: December 11, 2003 through February 25, 2004
China-Iceland Arctic Science Observatory (CIAO)	Kárhóll, Iceland	18 October 2018	10 (summer and winter)

== Polar Research ==
The PRIC leads polar scientific research, develops polar exploration and observation technologies and equipment, and plans and leads international large-scale scientific programs through its research stations and expeditions. The institute contains teams which focus on areas including polar security and policy research, polar ice and climate change, polar atmosphere, space physics and astronomy.

The PRIC is developing a comprehensive, multi-domain observation and detection system for use in polar environments.

In 2014, Chinese researchers deployed the country's first ice-tethered buoys in the Arctic Ocean, equipped with oceanographic sensors suspended along a line extending hundreds of meters through the water column, marking a significant step toward unmanned environmental monitoring. China's Taiyuan University of Technology has developed acoustic detection buoys, sea ice multi-parameter buoys (IMB), sea ice melt pool observation buoys, unmanned sea ice stations, and sea ice temperature chain buoys, which have been successfully deployed at multiple locations in the Arctic Ocean during the PRIC's Arctic expeditions.

While these environmental monitoring and detection systems support civilian oceanographic research, some observers of China's Arctic activities point out that underwater sensors can also serve dual-use purposes. Underwater microphones can not only monitor scientific data but also detect and track submarines, ships, and explore seabed resources. These concerns are supported by a study of the buoy's test results in the Chinese Journal of Polar Research, which notes that "the acoustic information gathered by the planned large-scale listening network could have diverse applications, including subglacial communications, navigation and positioning, target detection, and the reconstruction of marine environmental parameters." In July 2023, the PRIC announced that it intended to deploy listening devices "on a large scale in the Arctic Ocean," having successfully field-tested the technology. Analysts have drawn parallels between China's current buoy network, ostensibly for "oceanographic surveys and acoustic modelling," and its activities in the South China Sea, where similar efforts were critical for the PLA Navy's operational effectiveness. The dual-use applications of scientific research reflect the Chinese doctrine of military-civil fusion, the principle that the Chinese civilian and commercial sectors must serve the Chinese Communist Party (CCP)'s national security objectives.

== International collaboration ==
The institute is an active member of the University of the Arctic. UArctic is an international cooperative network based in the Circumpolar Arctic region, consisting of more than 200 universities, colleges, and other organizations with an interest in promoting education and research in the Arctic region. The PRIC and University of Iceland signed an agreement in 2012 to establish the China-Iceland Arctic Observatory (CIAO), which officially opened in 2018. The PRIC also collaborates with institutions like the Norwegian Polar Institute and the Alfred Wegner Institute.

== See also ==
- Arctic policy of China
- Chinese Arctic and Antarctic Administration
- Xue Long and Xue Long 2
