= E Dongchen =

Chinese scientist and explorer (1939–2019)

- 鄂栋臣
- Born: 15 July 1939; Guangfeng, Jiangxi, China
- Died: 21 February 2019 (aged 79); Wuhan, Hubei, China
- Education: Wuhan Institute of Surveying and Mapping
- Known for: Founder of polar surveying and mapping in China
- Awards: Ho Leung Ho Lee Prize in Earth Sciences
- Scientific career
- Fields: Geodetic survey
- Workplaces: Wuhan University

Chinese name
- Traditional Chinese: 鄂棟臣
- Simplified Chinese: 鄂栋臣
Transcriptions
Standard Mandarin
- Hanyu Pinyin: È Dòngchén
- Wade–Giles: O Tung-ch'en

E Dongchen (Chinese: 鄂栋臣; 15 July 1939 – 21 February 2019) was a Chinese earth scientist and polar explorer, acclaimed as the "father of polar surveying and mapping" in China. He participated in 11 polar expeditions, including the first Chinese expeditions to Antarctica and the North Pole. He was a professor and doctoral advisor at Wuhan University and was a recipient of the Ho Leung Ho Lee Prize in Earth Sciences.

== Biography ==
E Dongchen was born on 15 July 1939 in Guangfeng, Jiangxi, Republic of China, in the midst of the Second Sino-Japanese War. When he was a child, his grandmother and father were killed by Japanese troops, and he worked as a cowherd to make a living.

After the end of the wars and the establishment of the People's Republic of China, an elementary school was opened in his village in 1950 and he attended school for the first time at the age of 11. He excelled in school, and was admitted to the Wuhan Institute of Surveying and Mapping in 1960. After graduating in 1965 with a degree in astronomical and geodetic survey, he taught at a military academy and his alma mater, which was later merged into Wuhan University to become its School of Geodesy and Geomatics.

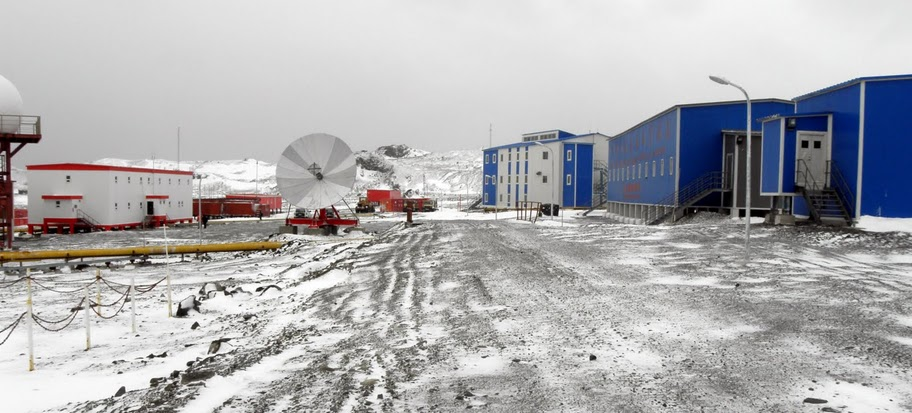
The Great Wall Station in 2011

In 1984, E joined China's first expedition to Antarctica under Guo Kun and led the surveying and mapping team. His team surveyed more than 1,600 points, and the expedition constructed China's first Antarctic research base, the Great Wall Station, which was opened on 20 February 1985. Four years later, he joined another expedition and participated in the construction of China's second Antarctic base, the Zhongshan Station.

When China sent its first scientific expedition to the North Pole in 1999, E joined the team at the age of 60. He was the only scientist who participated in building all three Chinese polar research bases and the first North Pole expedition. In total, he took part in 11 polar expeditions, including seven to Antarctica and four to the North Pole. He named more than 300 features and places in Antarctica, including the Great Wall Bay, the first Chinese place name in Antarctica.

E was an academician of the International Eurasian Academy of Sciences, and Honorary Director of the Chinese Antarctic Center of Surveying and Mapping. He received a number of awards, including the Ho Leung Ho Lee Prize in Earth Sciences.

After his retirement, E became a writer of popular science books and a motivational speaker. He gave more than 600 speeches on polar exploration in universities and schools all over China.

On 21 February 2019, E died at the Zhongnan Hospital of Wuhan University, at the age of 79 (80 in East Asian age reckoning).

== Selected publications ==
Among E's publications are:

- Yuande YANG, Cheinway HWANG, Dongchen E, A fixed full-matrix method for determining ice sheet height change from satellite altimeter: an ENVISAT case study in East Antarctica with backscatter analysis, Journal of Geodesy, 2014, 88: 901–914 (SCI)
- Yuande YANG, Dongchen E, Zemin WANG, Lexian YUAN, Elevation change from Zhongshan Station to Dome A using Envisat data, Geomatics and Information Science of Wuhan University, 2013, 38 (4): 383–385 (EI)
- Jifeng Huang, Dongchen E, Shengkai Zhang, Zero calibration of bottom pressure gauge in Antarctic: A case study at Chinese Zhongshan station using GPS techniques, Proceedings – 2012 20th International Conference on Geoinformatics, 2012, DOI: 10.1109/Geoinformatics. 2012.6270311 (EI)
- Yang YD, Dong-Chen E, HH Wang, DB Chao, C Hwang, F Li, and AS Tao, Sea ice concentration over the Antarctic Ocean from satellite pulse altimetry, Science China (Earth Science), 2011, 54 (1): 113–118 (SCI)
- Dongchen E, Xin ZHANG, Zemin WANG, Chunxia ZHOU, Satellite monitoring of blue-ice extent in Grove mountains, Antarctica, Geomatics and Information Science of Wuhan University, 2011, 36 (9): 1009–1011, 1016. (EI)
- Dongchen E, Luocheng ZHAO, Zemin WANG, Zhicai LUO, Establishment of gravity base over Larsemann Hills in Antarctica, Geomatics and Information Science of Wuhan University, 2011, 36(12): 1466–1469 (EI)
- Feihu MA, Dongchen E, Jianhu ZHAO, Cuiyu SUN, Multi-beam sound intensity amplitude filtering methods, Geomatics and Information Science of Wuhan University, 2010, 35 (9): 1082–1085 (EI)
- Dongchen E, Qiang SHEN, Ying XU, Gang CHEN, High-accuracy topographical information extraction based on fusion of ASTER stereo-data and ICESat/GLAS data in Antarctica, Science China (Earth Science), 2009, 52 (5): 714–722 (SCI)
- Yuande YANG, Dongchen E, Dingbo CHAO, Haihong WANG, Seasonal and inter-annual change in land water storage from GRACE, Chinese Journal of Geophysics, 2009, 52 (12): 2987–2992 (SCI)
- Yuande YANG, Dongchen E, Dingbo CHAO, The sea level change from the Antarctic ice sheet based on GRACE, Chinese Journal of Geophysics, 2009, 52 (9): 2222–2228 (SCI)
