= Kunlun Dark Universe Survey Telescope =

Planned survey telescope

- Alternative names: KDUST
- Location: Antarctica
- Diameter: 2.5 m (8 ft 2 in)

The Kunlun Dark Universe Survey Telescope, also known as KDUST, was a planned large survey telescope to be installed at the Chinese Antarctic Kunlun Station located at Dome A ice plateau in Antarctica. It was intended to take advantage of the exceptional observation conditions due to low temperature, clean air quality and low disturbances which reduce background noises for infrared observations. Due to a combined budget of over 1 billion yuan for KDUST and the Dome A Terahertz Explorer-5 (DATE5), the plan to build both telescopes was suspended.

The plan for KDUST was a 2.5 meter infrared optical telescope designed to detect and observe Earth-like planets in the Milky Way using infrared light, but at much higher resolution than the Antarctica Schmidt telescopes project. The telescope would have perched on a 14.5-meter-tall tower to lift it above the turbulence layer. KDUST was scheduled to be installed by 2025, but by early 2026 the plan was called off.
