= Ross Dependency =

New Zealand's territorial claim in Antarctica

- Dependency
- Flag

- Sovereign state: New Zealand
- Claimed by the United Kingdom: 1841
- Claim transferred to New Zealand: 1923
- Sector claim: 160°E – 150°W
- Main base and administrative centre: Scott Base; 77°50′57″S 166°46′06″E
- Official languages: English
- Government: Dependency under a constitutional monarchy
  - Monarch: Charles III
  - Governor: Dame Cindy Kiro

Area
  - Total: 450,000 km^{2} (170,000 sq mi)

Population
  - Seasonal estimate: 10–80 (Scott Base); 200–1,000 (McMurdo Station); 85–200 (South Pole Station); 0–90 (Zucchelli Station); 20–60 (Jang Bogo Station); 30–80 (Qinling Station)
- Currency: New Zealand dollar (NZ$) (NZD)
- Time zone: UTC+12:00 (NZST)
  - Summer (DST): UTC+13:00 (NZDT)
- Calling code: +64 2409
- Internet TLD: .aq; .nz

The Ross Dependency is a region of Antarctica defined by a sector originating at the South Pole, passing along longitudes 160° east to 150° west, and terminating at latitude 60° south. It is claimed by New Zealand, a claim mutually accepted only by Australia, the UK, France and Norway, which are countries that also have territorial claims in Antarctica. Under the 1961 Antarctic Treaty, of which all territorial claimants are signatories, including New Zealand, all claims are held in abeyance. Article IV states: "No acts or activities taking place while the present Treaty is in force shall constitute a basis for asserting, supporting or denying a claim to territorial sovereignty in Antarctica or create any rights of sovereignty in Antarctica".

The Dependency takes its name from Sir James Clark Ross, who discovered the Ross Sea, and includes part of Victoria Land and most of the Ross Ice Shelf. Ross, Balleny, Scott and Roosevelt Islands also form part of the Dependency.

== History of claim ==
Following his discovery of Victoria Land in 1841, James Clark Ross took possession of this territory, along with the surrounding sea, on behalf of Britain. On 30 July 1923, the British Government passed an Order in Council under the British Settlements Act 1887, which defined the current borders of the Ross Dependency as follows:

From and after the publication of this Order in the Government Gazette of the Dominion of New Zealand that part of His Majesty's Dominions in the Antarctic Seas, which comprises all the islands and territories between the 160th degree of East Longitude and the 150th degree of West Longitude which are situated south of the 60th degree of South Latitude shall be named the Ross Dependency.

The Order in Council then went on to appoint the governor-general and commander-in-chief of New Zealand as the governor of the territory. This Order in Council was published in the New Zealand Gazette on 16 August 1923, and on 14 November 1923, the governor-general issued regulations extending New Zealand law to the Ross Dependency.

After the Order in Council was read in the New Zealand House of Representatives by the Prime Minister of New Zealand William Massey, a clarification was made by the Attorney-General Sir Francis Bell in the legislative council. Bell stated:

The boundaries of New Zealand are not extended to include the Ross sea and adjacent lands. His Majesty's delegation to the Governor-General of New Zealand did not confer upon the government or parliament of New Zealand the same powers as were vested by the Constitution Act in respect of the Dominion itself. It might be assumed that in the administration of the Ross Dependency that he would invite advice from his New Zealand ministers and it was certain that details would be entrusted to the New Zealand Government. But his excellency was required in all matters of legislation and regulation for the Ross Territory to comply with instructions from the colonial secretary. There was no reason to believe that the Colonial Office would give such instructions without prior consultation with the Government of the Dominion, but the part which the New Zealand Government had agreed to take in enabling His Majesty to exercise jurisdiction in and over the Ross Territory must be taken on behalf of the Empire as a whole and not specially in the interests of New Zealand.

It has been said that the Order in Council contained no suggestion of a transfer to New Zealand of the United Kingdom's claim, but the fact remains that the territory is administered by the Government of New Zealand. Technically, the claim is that of the monarch and they can exercise it through any of their governments.

At an Imperial Conference in 1930, it was agreed that the governors-general of the Dominions would be appointed by the king on the advice of the Dominion in question. And following the passing of the Statute of Westminster in 1931 (which was adopted in full by New Zealand in 1947), the Government of the United Kingdom relinquished all control over the government of New Zealand. This however had no bearing on the obligations of the governor-general of New Zealand in their capacity as governor of the Ross Dependency on the appointment of the Government of the United Kingdom. Then in the year 1959, the Antarctic Treaty was signed by twelve nations, which included both the United Kingdom and New Zealand.

The New Zealand government began to take some interest in the territory in 1955. As reliance on the United Kingdom waned, New Zealand's exercise of authority began to rely on the United States, which maintained a much larger presence in the territory, despite the United States not recognising the New Zealand claim and reserving the right to make a claim of its own. The New Zealand Scott Base was established close to the American McMurdo Station, and Americans in the territory are exempt from taxation, customs, and criminal jurisdiction in minor matters.

== Geography and habitation ==
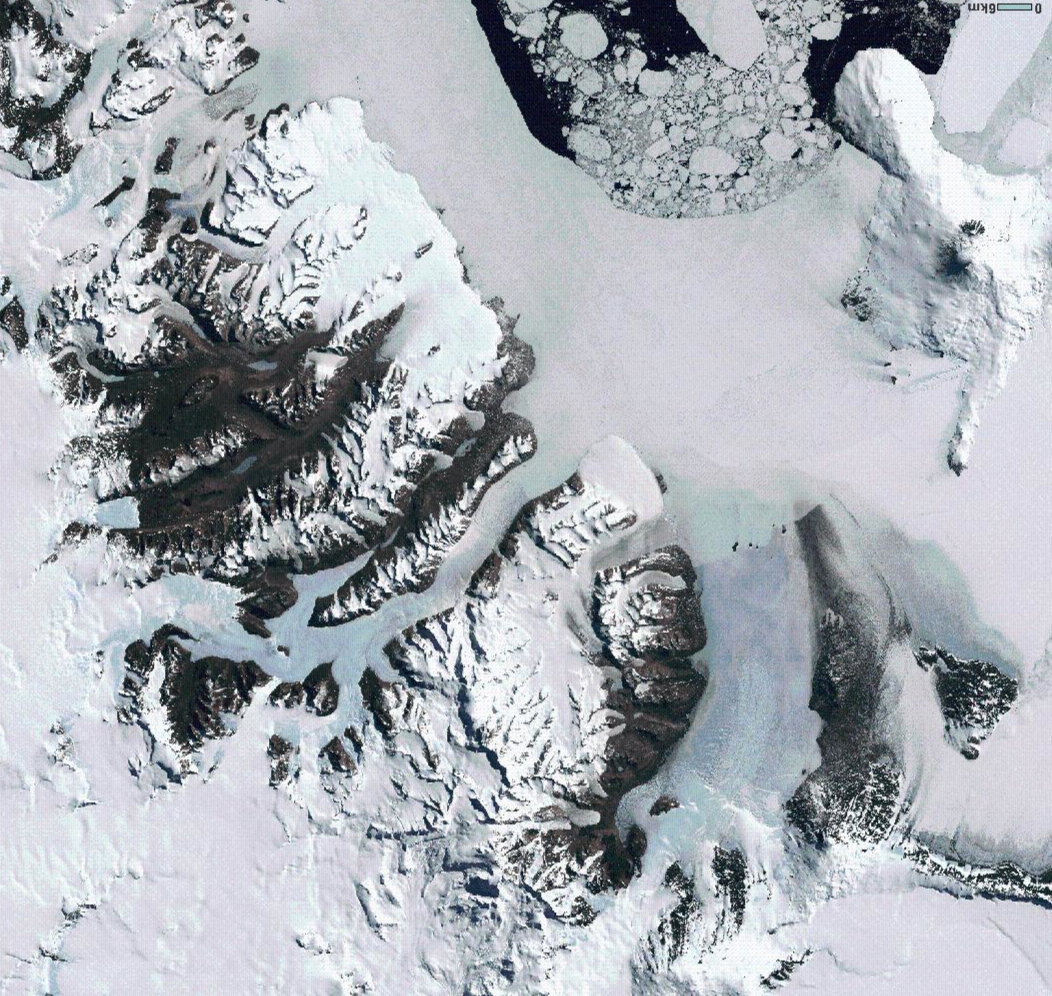
Mosaic of Landsat images, showing McMurdo Sound (right) and the Dry Valleys (left). Part of Ross Island is visible upper right.

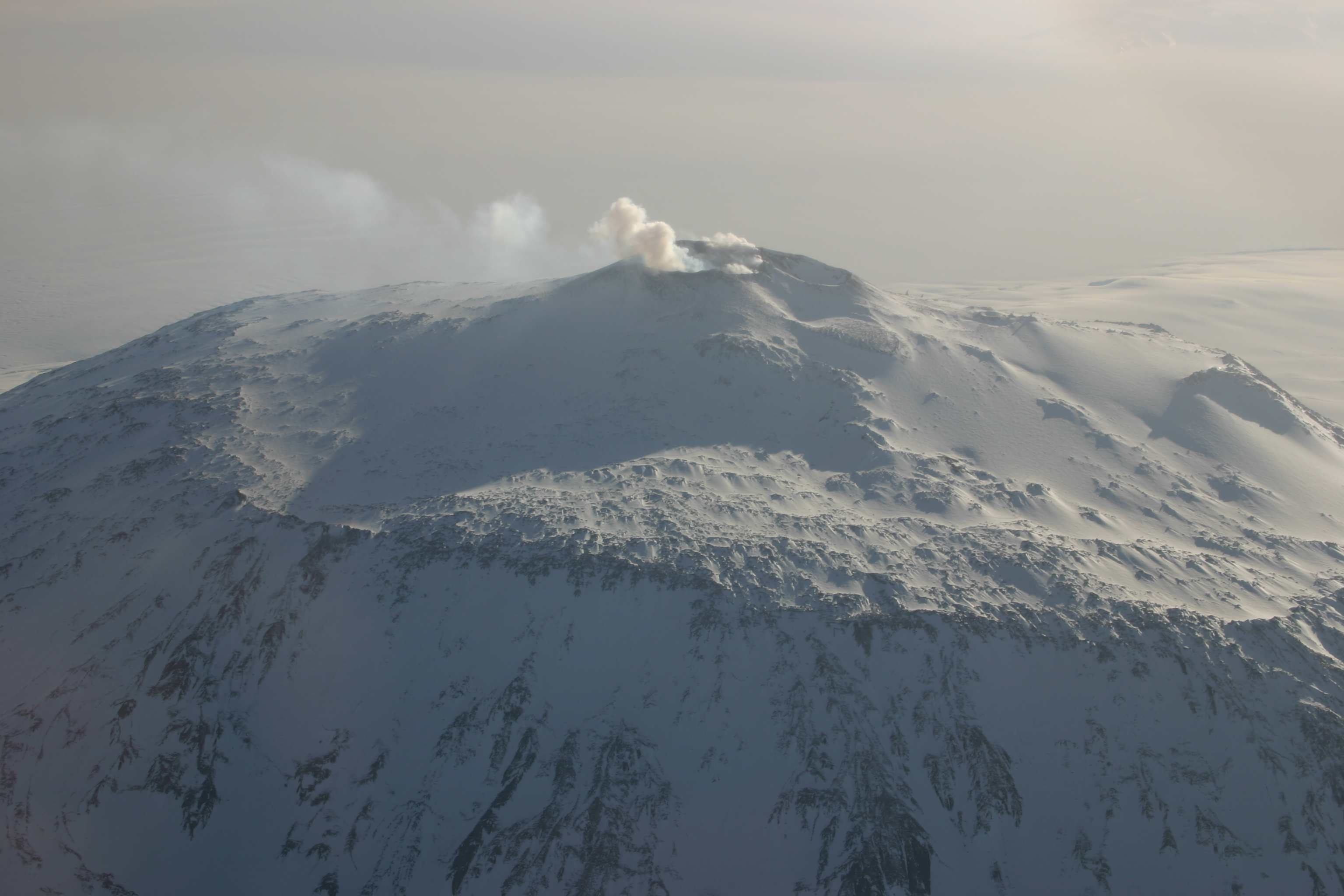
Aerial photo of Mount Erebus on Ross Island

The actual amount of land mass claimed is not large; most of the area defined as being in the Ross Dependency is either in the Ross Sea or the Antarctic Ocean. It is the second-smallest of the claims which were made before the implementation of the Antarctic Treaty System and the suspension of all territorial claims to Antarctica proper. Officers of the Government of the Ross Dependency are annually appointed to run the Dependency. The New Zealand Geographic Board has named many features within the Dependency.

The scientific bases of Scott Base (New Zealand), McMurdo Station (US), Zucchelli Station (Italy) and Jang Bogo Station (South Korea) are the only permanently occupied human habitations in the area, though Amundsen–Scott South Pole Station (US) is partially within the territory and dependent on logistics operations based in New Zealand. China is establishing a year-round research station at Inexpressible Island in Terra Nova Bay of the Ross Sea that opened in 2024. The Dependency has access to US Antarctic Program-maintained snow runways at Williams Field and Phoenix Airfield. This guarantees accessibility by wheeled and ski-equipped aircraft year-round.

From 1969 to 1995 New Zealand operated a summer-only base called Vanda Station in the Dry Valley area of the Dependency.

The New Zealand Defence Force is tasked with providing support for New Zealand programmes in Antarctica. This is provided by the Royal New Zealand Air Force's C-130J and Boeing 757 aircraft. New Zealand military personnel also fulfill communications, logistics and other duties at Scott Base. In 2020, the Royal New Zealand Navy commissioned a new logistics support ship, HMNZS Aotearoa, which is a Polar-class Level 6 vessel (Summer/autumn operation in medium first-year ice) capable of berthing at McMurdo Station (ten minutes by jeep from Scott Base) for resupply purposes.

About 1.12 million square kilometres of the Ross Sea region have been declared a Marine Protected Area (MPA). In this regard, the Navy is tasked with conducing Southern Ocean patrols during the fishing season to enforce international rules and fight against illegal, unregulated and unreported fishing.

Greenpeace maintained its Antarctic station in the Ross Dependency called World Park Base from 1987 to 1992, which was on Ross Island. As this base was a non-governmental entity, the official policy of the signatory nations of the Antarctic Treaty was not to give any support or assistance to it.

== Other events ==
In 1979, an Air New Zealand sightseeing flight crashed into the slopes of Mount Erebus killing all 257 people on board. It was the most deadly air crash in the history of both Antarctica and New Zealand (see Mount Erebus disaster).

In the summer of 1985, when the British non-governmental exploratory vessel Southern Quest sank in the Ross Sea, the United States Coast Guard helicopters rescued the crew, who were taken to McMurdo Station. The British expedition was criticised by scientists in the Antarctic because the rescue and return of the crew disrupted their work.

In 2006, the New Zealand police reported that jurisdictional issues prevented them from issuing warrants for potential American witnesses who were reluctant to testify during the Christchurch Coroner's investigation into the poisoning death of Rodney Marks at the South Pole base.

== See also ==
- Territorial claims in Antarctica
- Timeline of New Zealand's links with Antarctica
