= Guo Kun =

Chinese polar explorer (1935–2019)

Guo Kun (Chinese: 郭琨; September 1935 – 3 April 2019) was a Chinese polar explorer. He led China's first expedition to Antarctica in 1984–1985 and participated in seven Antarctic expeditions in total. He led the construction of China's first two Antarctic bases, the Great Wall Station in 1985 and the Zhongshan Station in 1989, and served as Director of the Chinese Arctic and Antarctic Administration.

== Early life and career ==
Guo was born in September 1935 in Laishui County, Hebei, Republic of China. After graduating from the Harbin Institute of Military Technology in 1962, he initially worked in meteorology and atmospheric sounding. In 1976, he was transferred to the State Oceanic Administration (SOA) and later joined the newly established Chinese Arctic and Antarctic Administration under the SOA.

== First Antarctic expedition and the Great Wall Station ==
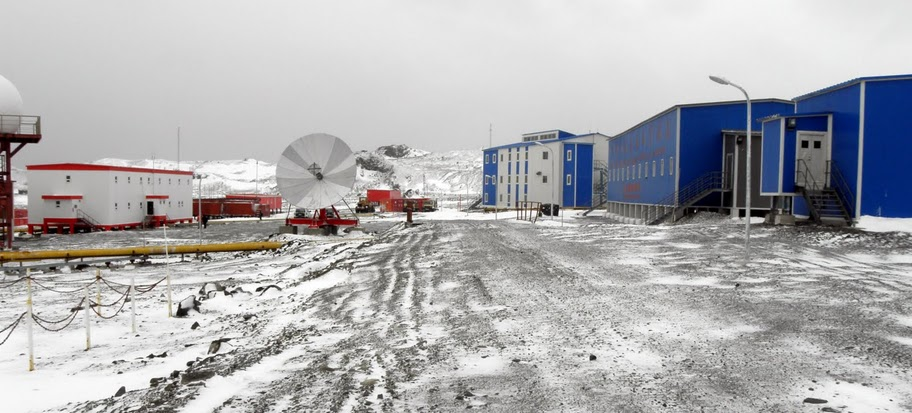
The Great Wall Station in 2011

In 1984, China organized its first scientific expedition to Antarctica, and Guo was named the leader of the 591-member expedition team. The team departed Shanghai on 20 November 1984 on two ships, the Xiang Yang Hong 10 and the J121, and arrived at King George Island off the coast of Antarctica on 30 December. A main part of their mission was to construct China's first Antarctic base, the Great Wall Station. As the Xiang Yang Hong 10 was not an icebreaker, the team had to leave before the end of the Antarctic summer and had only a short window of opportunity to complete their mission. Under Guo's supervision, the team worked 16 to 17 hours a day in often severe weather conditions, and completed the construction in only 40 days. The station was opened on 14 February 1985.

In 2012, the Antarctic Treaty System designated two sites at the Great Wall Station erected by Guo's team as Historic Sites and Monuments in Antarctica: the station's No. 1 Building and a monolith with the Chinese inscription: "Great Wall Station, First Chinese Antarctic Research Expedition, 20 February 1985".

== Zhongshan Station ==
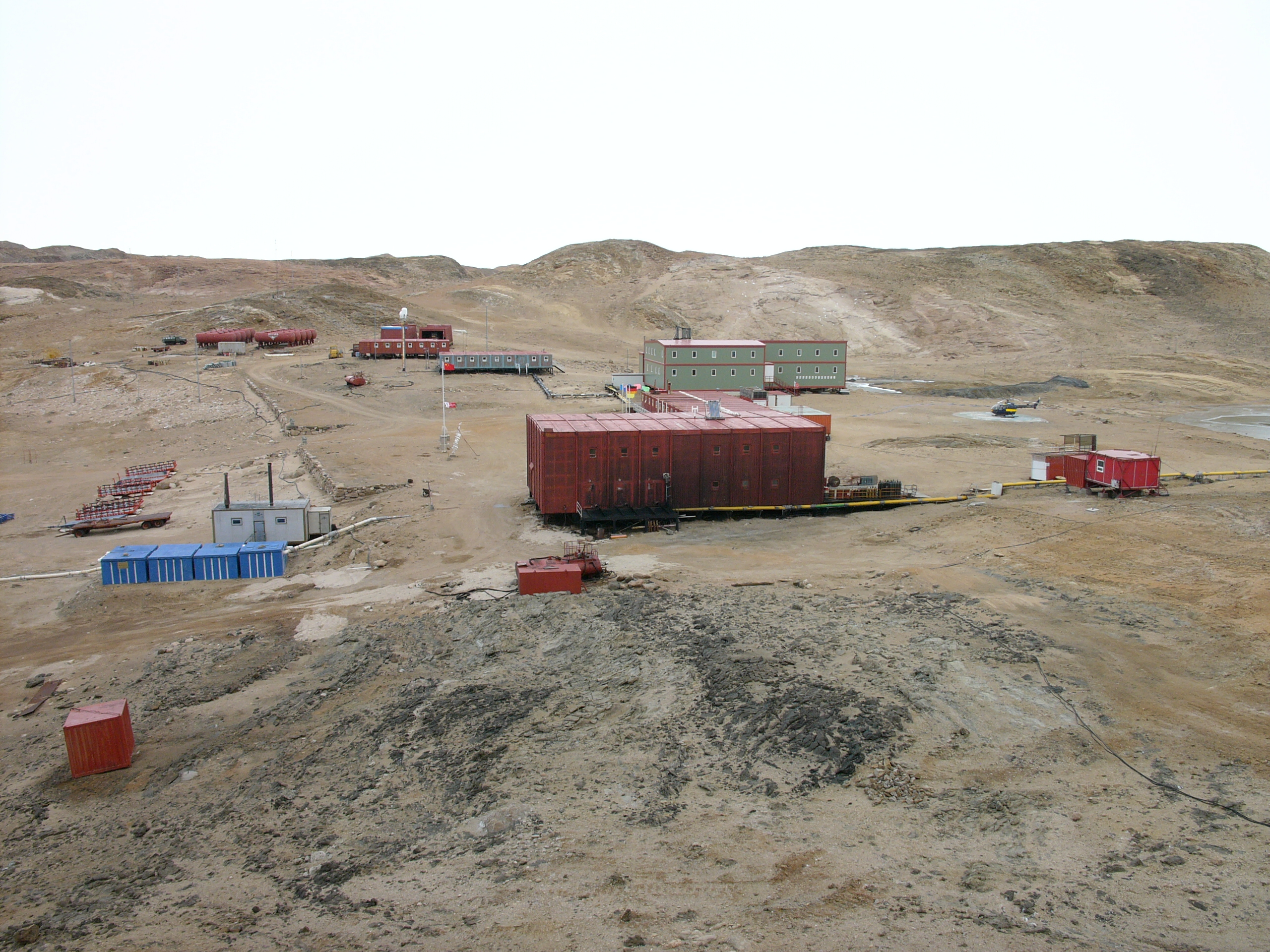
The Zhongshan Station in 2007

Four years later, Guo led another expedition to Antarctica, with the mission to establish China's second base. The team set out from Qingdao in November 1988 on the ship Jidi. After reaching Prydz Bay in Antarctica, the ship encountered a major icefall in the night of 14 January 1989. She missed being directly hit by ice by just two or three meters, and became trapped by icebergs for seven days. Many team members wrote their wills and were ready to die. Luckily, the icebergs shifted on the seventh day and temporarily created a 30-meter-wide opening, and Guo's team seized the opportunity to escape from the trap. The opening lasted for just two hours before closing again. The team proceeded to construct the Zhongshan Station at Prydz Bay in only 28 days, which opened on 26 February 1989.

== Later career ==
Guo spent most of his career planning for and participating in Antarctic expeditions, seven in total. He also helped equip the research vessels Jidi and Xue Long, served as Director of the Chinese Arctic and Antarctic Administration, and attended international conferences on polar research.

== Health and death ==
In his old age Guo lost the ability to walk, likely because of the extended amount of time he had spent under extreme polar conditions. He died on 3 April 2019 in Beijing, at the age of 83.

== See also ==
- E Dongchen, scientist who led the surveying and mapping team in the 1984 Antarctic expedition
