= Taishan Station =

Taishan Station may refer to:

- Taishan Station (Antarctica), Chinese research station
- Taishan metro station, a stop on the Taoyuan Airport MRT, in Taiwan
- Taishan railway station (Shandong) (泰山站), a station on Beijing–Shanghai railway in Taishan District, Tai'an, Shandong
- Taishan railway station (Guangdong) (台山站)
- Guohua Taishan Power Station, a 5k MW coal-fired power station in Guangdong Province, China
