= China-Iceland Arctic Science Observatory =

Joint Chinese-Icelandic polar science facility

- Interactive map of the China-Iceland Arctic Science Observatory area

General information
- Location: Kárhóll, Iceland
- Opened: October 18, 2018
- Owner: Jointly operated by Aurora Observatory and the Polar Research Institute of China

The China-Iceland Arctic Science Observatory (CIAO) is a collaborative research facility located in Kárhóll, northern Iceland, dedicated to Arctic scientific research. Established in October 2018, it is jointly operated by the Polar Research Institute of China (PRIC) and the Icelandic Centre for Research (Rannis). The observatory is built on land leased from Aurora Observatory, an Icelandic non-profit foundation. It began preliminary data collection in 2013 before its official opening on October 18, 2018.

== History ==
The idea for CIAO emerged from discussions between Chinese and Icelandic researchers to study Arctic phenomena, particularly the aurora borealis and upper atmosphere research. In 2013, PRIC and Rannis formalized their partnership, with initial data collection focusing on ionospheric and atmospheric studies. The observatory was officially inaugurated in 2018. This marked the second permanent Arctic research station operated by China following their larger station in Svalbard, Norway.

== Facilities ==
The land of the Observatory is 156 hectares. It was previously a privately owned farm, designated partially as agricultural land and partially as forestry area under a contract with the Forest Service. The Observatory research building is 763 m^{2} on three floors. It includes a guest centre and an auditorium seating 56 people intended for public outreach (education and tourism), to be opened fall 2019. The second floor has meeting rooms, work spaces, cafeteria and research facilities. The third floor is designed for research facilities, work spaces, six camera towers and lazer/lidar rooms. In the outside area there is already a rio-meter field with 37 antennas installed, two magnetic meters, weather stations and more. The observatory accommodates up to 10 people.

== Research ==
The China-Iceland Arctic Science Observatory mainly supports multi-disciplinary observation and research on aurora and space weather, atmospheric science and meteorology, biology and ecology, oceanography, glaciology, geophysics and geology, climate change and environmental science.

== Collaboration and operations ==
CIAO operates under a cooperative agreement between PRIC and Rannis, facilitating scientific exchange between China and Iceland.
