= Great Wall Station (Antarctica) =

Great Wall Station 长城站
- Antarctic base
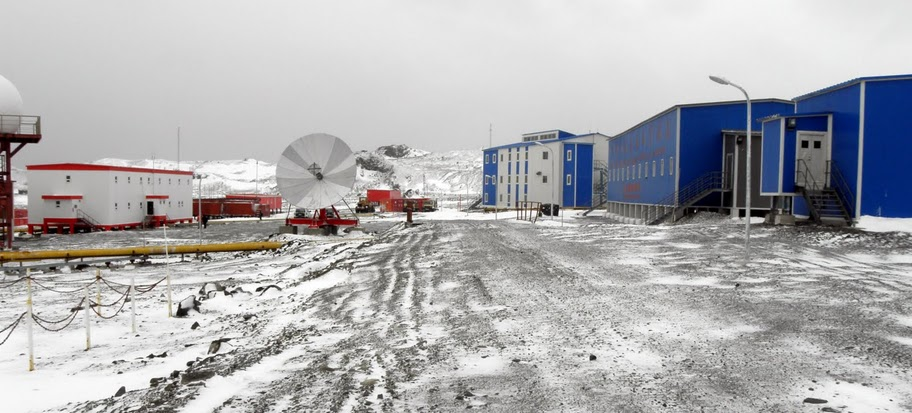
- Great Wall Station

- Location of Great Wall Station in Antarctica
- Coordinates: 62°13′01″S 58°57′43″W
- Country: China
- Location in Antarctica: Fildes Peninsula; King George Island
- Administered by: Polar Research Institute of China
- Established: 20 February 1985
- Elevation: 10 m (33 ft)

Population (2017)
  - Summer: 60
  - Winter: 13
- UN/LOCODE: AQ GWL
- Type: All-year round
- Period: Annual
- Status: Operational
- Activities: List: Geology; Geomagnetism; Seismology
- Website: Chinese Arctic and Antarctic Administration

The Great Wall Station (Chinese: 长城站; pinyin: Chángchéng zhàn) is the first Chinese research station in Antarctica and opened on 20 February 1985. It lies on the Fildes Peninsula on King George Island, 960 kilometres (600 mi) from Cape Horn. It is sited on ice-free rock, about 10 metres (33 ft) above sea level.

The station is about 2.5 kilometres (1.6 mi) from the Chilean Base Presidente Eduardo Frei Montalva. A 3 kilometres (1.9 mi) long unpaved road, Zhongzhi Gonglu, provides convenient vehicle access from the station to Frei, Teniente Rodolfo Marsh Martin Airport and Bellingshausen Station. The station collaborates with logistical support and sharing of facilities with other nearby stations from Chile, Russia, Uruguay, Korea and Brazil. It is situated at an altitude of 10–44 m above sea level and has an average annual temperature of approximately -2.1 degree Celsius Temperatures range from extreme summer highs around 11.7 degree Celsius to winter lows of -27.7 degree Celsius.

== History ==
In 1984, China organized its first scientific expedition to Antarctica, and Guo Kun (Chinese: 郭琨) was named the leader of the 591-member expedition team. The team departed Shanghai on 20 November 1984 on two ships, the Xiang Yang Hong 10 (Chinese: 向阳红) and the J121, and arrived at King George Island off the coast of Antarctica on 30 December. A main part of their mission was to construct China's first antarctic base, the Great Wall Station. As the Xiang Yang Hong 10 was not an icebreaker, the team had to leave before the end of the antarctic summer and had only a short window of opportunity to complete their mission. Under Guo's supervision, the team worked 16 to 17 hours a day in often severe weather conditions, and completed the construction in only 40 days. Construction of the station was completed on 14 February 1985.

In summer, the station holds up to 60 people; in winter, 14. The station's No. 1 Building, erected in 1985, lies at the centre of the station and has a total floor area of 175 square metres (1,880 sq ft). It marks the beginning of China's presence in Antarctica and its Antarctic research program.

In 2012, the Antarctic Treaty System designated two sites at the station as Historic Sites and Monuments in Antarctica following nominations by China: a monolith erected to commemorate the establishment of the station and the station's No.1 Building.

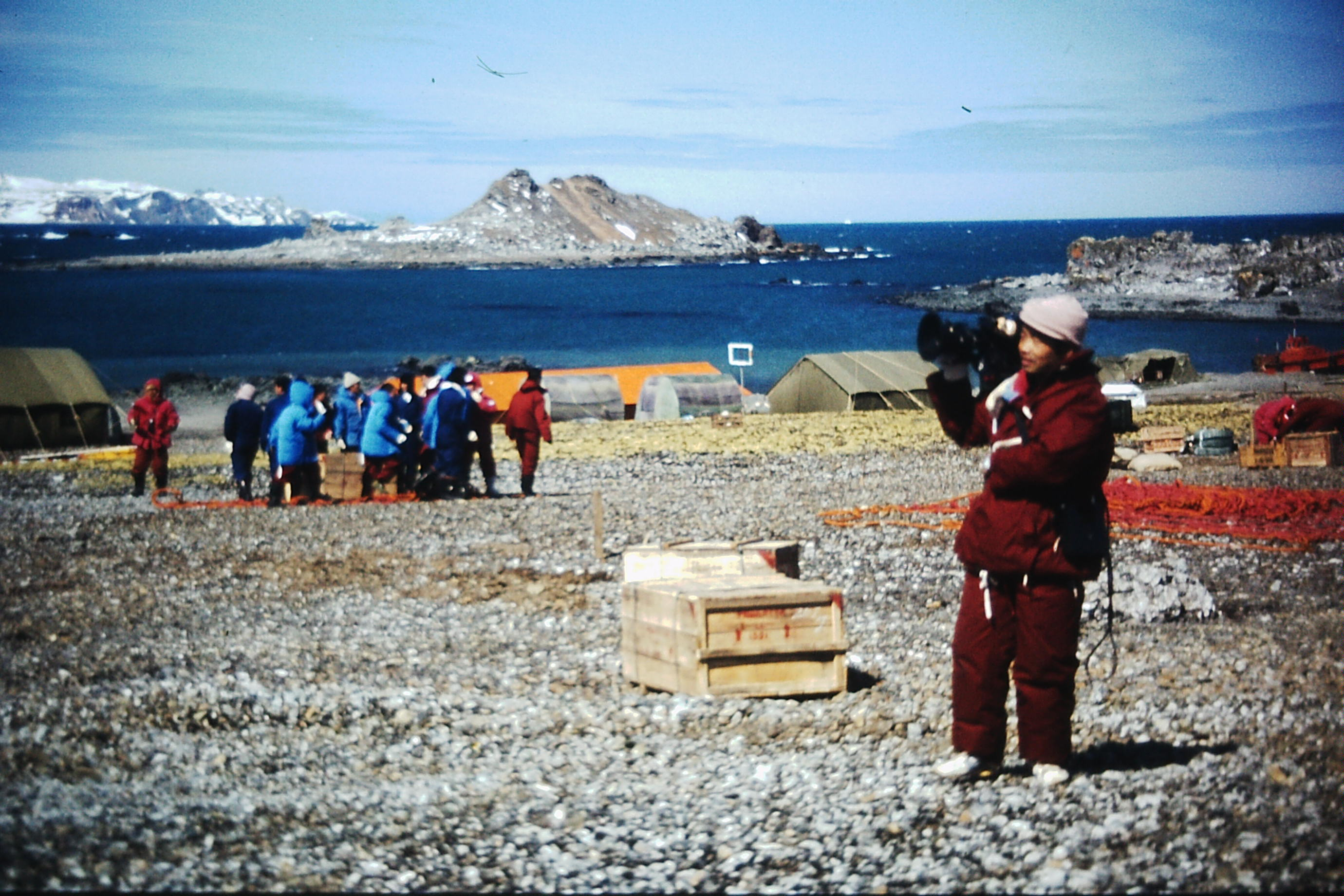
Construction of the Great Wall Station in January 1985, China's first base in Antarctica.

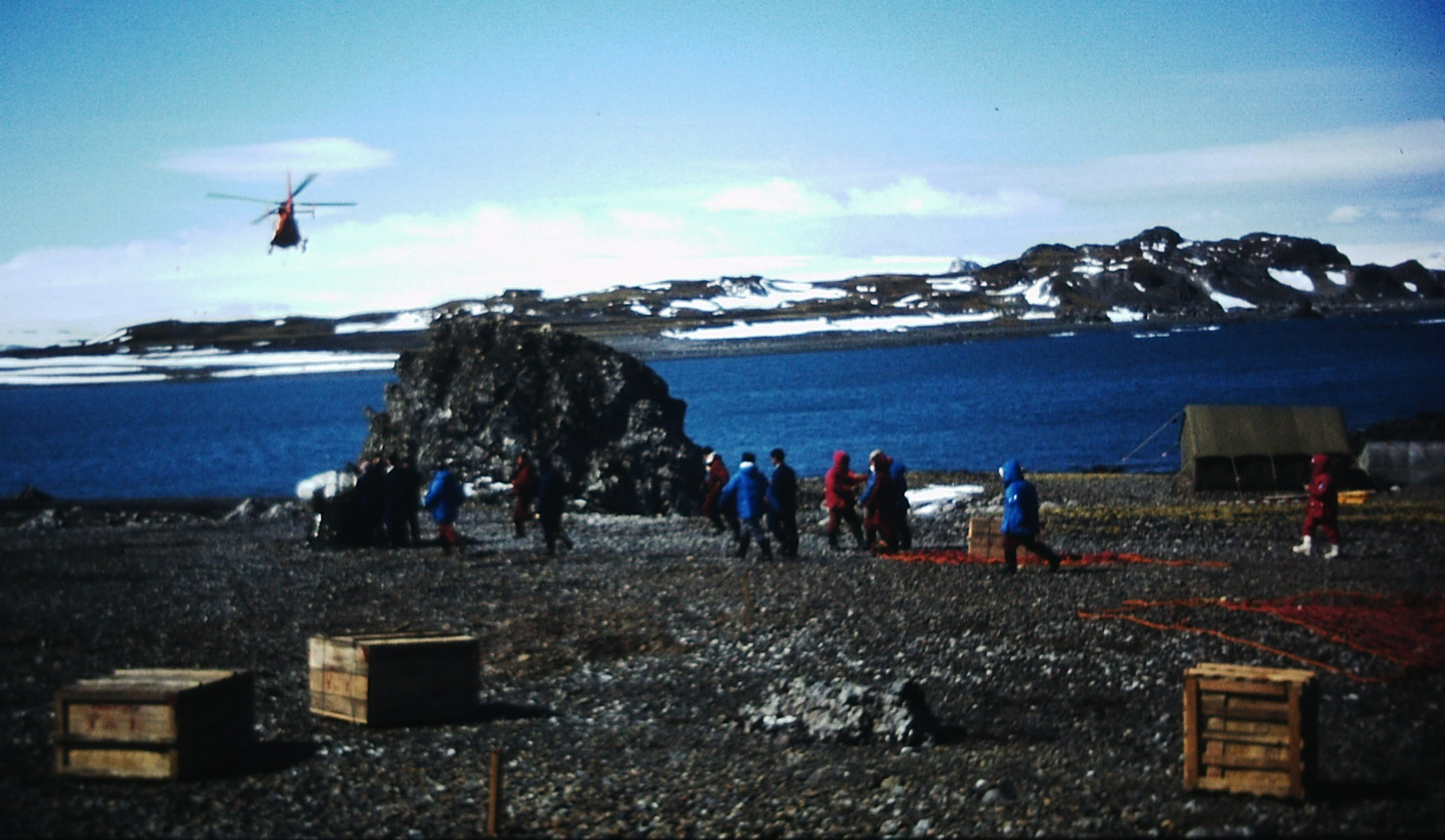
Construction of China's first antarctic base in January 1985, the Great Wall Station.

== See also ==
- List of Antarctic research stations
- List of Antarctic field camps
- Antarctic Zhongshan Station
- Antarctic Kunlun Station
- Antarctic Taishan Station
- Polar Research Institute of China
- Xue Long and Xue Long 2
- Arctic Yellow River Station

== Bibliography ==
- "Chinese expeditioners to reach highest Antarctic icecap". news.xinhuanet.com. 2008-01-08. Archived from the original on 18 January 2008.
- "China To Build 3rd Station In Antarctica". Space Daily (www.spacedaily.com).
