= Qinling Station =

Qinling Station 中国南极秦岭站
- Antarctic base
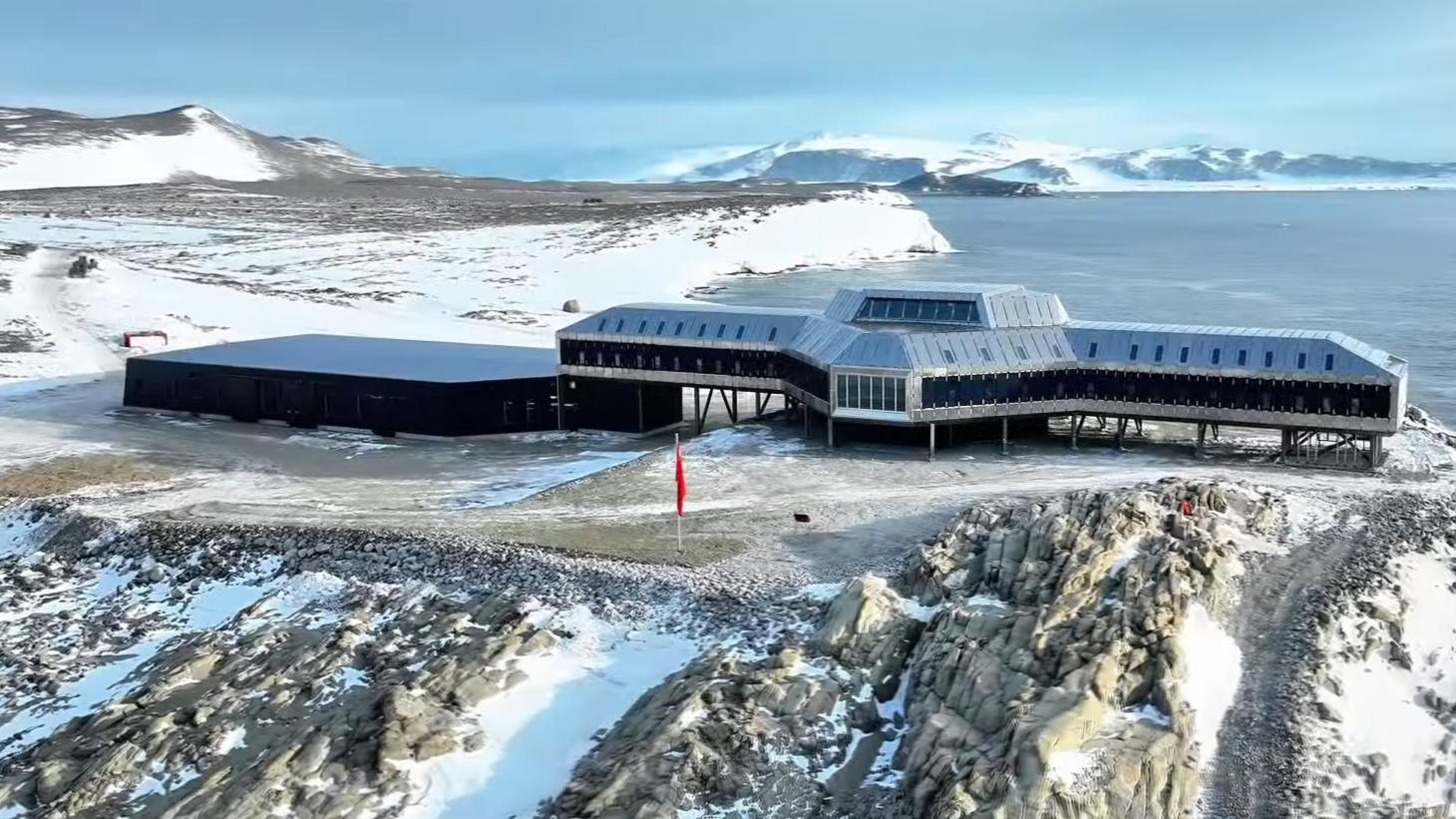
- 3D rendering of the Qinling Station project
- Interactive map of Qinling Station
- Coordinates: 74°56′04″S 163°42′55″E
- Country: China
- Operator: PRIC
- Established: 7 February 2024; 2 years ago

Population
  - Summer: 80
  - Winter: 30
- Active times: All year-round
- Status: Operational

Qinling Station (Chinese: 秦岭站; pinyin: Qínlǐng zhàn) is an Antarctic research station operated by the Polar Research Institute of China. It is situated on the southern edge of Inexpressible Island in Terra Nova Bay, Scott Coast, Victoria Land, on the Ross Sea coast of East Antarctica.

== Design ==
The station has an area of 5,244 m^{2} (56,450 ft^{2}), and is in the shape of the Southern Cross, honouring Zheng He, an admiral and diplomat during the Ming Dynasty. It is designed to be run year-long, with enough space for up to 80 people during the antipodal summer. The station's power system became operational in early 2025 and includes a generation capacity of 100 kW of wind power, 130 kW of solar power, 30 kW of hydrogen energy, and a 300 kWh low-temperature storage system, alongside a diesel power generator and a control system.

== History ==
The station first broke ground in 2018, but construction was delayed because of the COVID-19 pandemic. In November 2023, China sent a fleet with over 460 personnel to help complete construction of the station. On 7 February 2024, Qinling Station was officially opened by the People's Republic of China. The station was China's fifth research station on the continent and the third year-long station, after Great Wall and Zhongshan.

The Center for Strategic and International Studies, an American think tank, reported that the station was expected to include an observatory with a satellite ground station, and that the equipment could be used to collect signals intelligence and for tracking rockets launched from the Arnhem Space Centre in Australia. China rejected claims that the station would be used for espionage. A satellite ground station was expected to be part of the research station, but early photos of the site did not detect the presence of any such structure.

In March 2025 China announced plans of its intentions to build its sixth Antarctic station, for summer research, at Cox Point (74°57'S, 136°41'W) in Marie Byrd Land, West Antarctica.
