= Ridge A =

Site in Antarctica

- Location: Antarctic Treaty area
- Coordinates: 81°30′S 73°30′E
- Altitude: 4,053 m (13,297 ft)
- Telescopes: High Elevation Antarctic Terahertz Telescope
- Location within Antarctica

Ridge A is a site in Antarctica that was identified in 2009 as the best suited location on the surface of Earth for astronomical research. The site, approximately 1,000 kilometres (620 mi) from the South Pole and 144 kilometres (89 mi) southeast of Dome A, is situated in a portion of Antarctica claimed by Australia in the Australian Antarctic Territory.

The site is on the Antarctic Plateau at an altitude of 4,053 metres (13,297 ft), and has an average winter temperature of −70 °C (−94 °F). It is possible that this site may have even lower temperatures than Dome A, with temperatures that might reach as low as or even colder than the legendary mark of -100°C (-148°F). Ridge A was identified by a team of Australian and American scientists searching for the best observatory spot in the world. The team leader described the site as "so calm there's almost no wind or weather there at all." Ridge A is a low ridge of ice and has been estimated to have very low disturbances to visibility, such as thick atmospheric boundary layer, amount of water vapour and a number of others.

The site represents the "Eye of the Storm", whereby winds flowing off Antarctica in all directions appear to start from a point at Ridge A, where winds are at their calmest. It is also the site of a vortex in which swirling stratospheric winds high up and calm air at ground level combine to make it a place for viewing into space that is three times clearer than any other location on Earth.

Researchers on the project suggested that photographs taken through a telescope at Ridge A could be nearly as good as those taken by the Hubble Space Telescope. Despite the difficult conditions on Antarctica and the remote location of Ridge A, construction costs for an observatory there that could match the Hubble Space Telescope could be built at a fraction of the cost of sending Hubble into space.

For several years, a second Giant Magellan Telescope in Antarctica has been proposed.

== Observatory ==
Since January 2012, a small international observatory, the High Elevation Antarctic Terahertz (HEAT) telescope, has operated at Ridge A, jointly run by American and Australian researchers. By virtue of the weather, this submillimetre or terahertz telescope is capable of observing wavelengths of light that rarely make it through the atmosphere to the ground anywhere else on Earth.

== See also ==
- Dome A
- List of optical telescopes
- South Pole Telescope
