= High Elevation Antarctic Terahertz Telescope =

Far-infrared telescope at Ridge A in Antarctica

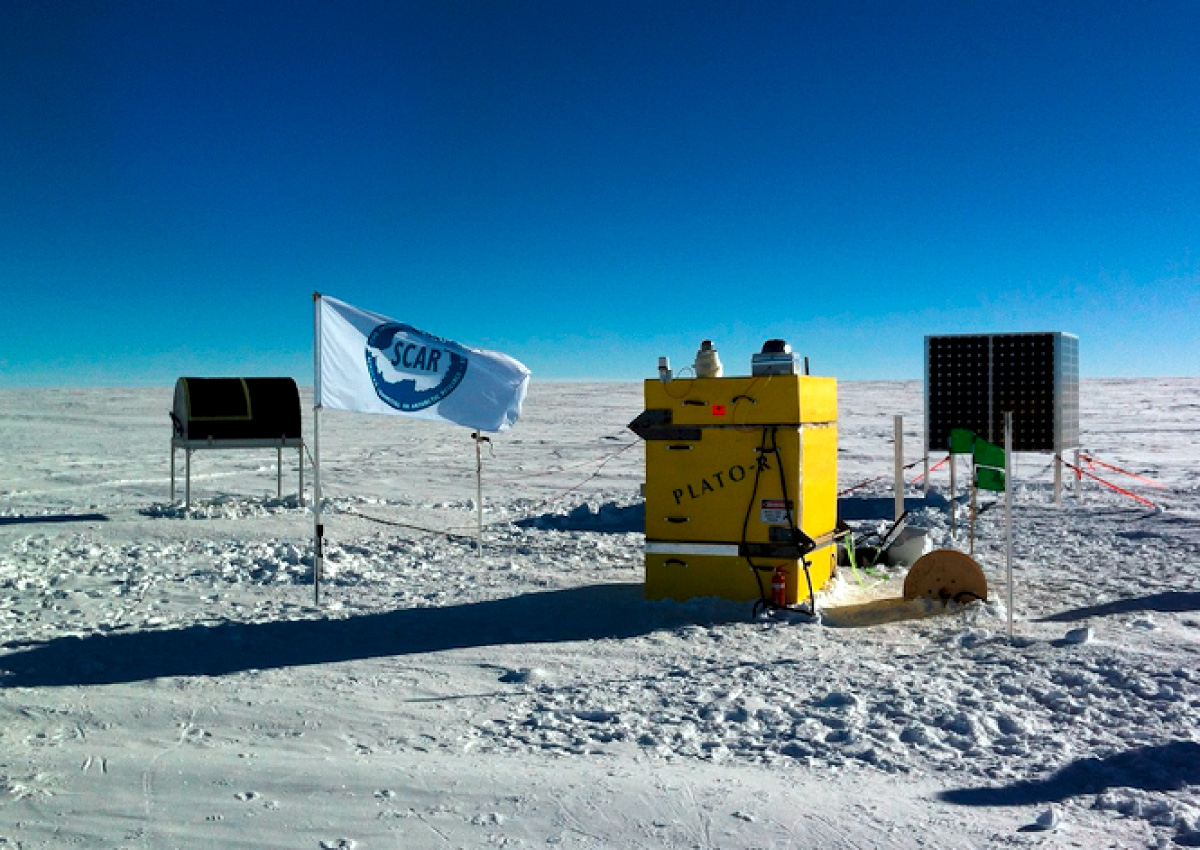
- Alternative names: HEAT
- Location: Ridge A, Antarctic Treaty area
- Coordinates: 81°30′S 73°30′E
- Organization: University of Arizona; University of New South Wales
- Altitude: 4,040 m (13,250 ft)
- Wavelength: 150 μm (2.0 THz)–600 μm (500 GHz)
- First light: January 2012
- Diameter: 60 cm (2 ft 0 in)
- Website: soral.as.arizona.edu/heat/
- Location within Antarctica
- Related media on Commons

The High Elevation Antarctic Terahertz telescope is a far-infrared telescope, established by the University of Arizona and the University of New South Wales located at Ridge A at an altitude of 4,053 metres (13,297 ft), considered the most ideal location for observation in the world. The extraordinary low humidity makes Inner Antarctica the best (by far) region for submillimeter astronomy observations. The telescope is robotic, remote controlled. It is mostly operated during the local winter, when the average temperature is −70 °C (−94 °F).

== See also ==
- List of astronomical observatories
- List of radio telescopes
