= Antarctica Schmidt telescopes =

Optical telescopes at Kunlun Station, Antarctica

- Alternative names: The Antarctic Schmidt/Survey Telescopes
- Location: Antarctica
- Coordinates: 80°25′S 77°07′E
- Location within Antarctica

The Antarctica Schmidt Telescopes project (also known as Antarctic Survey Telescopes (AST3)) is a joint project between Texas A&M University (TAMU) and the Beijing Astronomical Observatory to build three small (50cm aperture) different-filtered wide-field telescopes at the Antarctic Kunlun Station near Dome A in Antarctica. Lifan Wang at TAMU is the main instigator of the project.

These telescopes will take advantage of the low background and the long Antarctic nights to provide high-accuracy photometric time series for finding extrasolar planets, and to observe wide fields in the infrared to look for new supernovae.

The first of three Antarctic Survey Telescopes AST3-1, was installed at the Antarctic Kunlun Station in April 2012. The 2nd and 3rd telescopes were installed in 2015 and 2021, respectively.

An update was published indicating that the first telescope operated for only a few weeks in 2012 before a power failure, and was repaired in 2013, but the CCD controller proceeded to fail after further data collection. The AST3-2 unit has seen several design revisions to improve reliability in the harsh Antarctic environment, and was tested over the 2013-2014 winter in Mohe, China before being sent to the field.

The AST3-3 telescope is equipped with a near-infrared camera (AST3-NIR) to perform the Kunlun Infrared Sky Survey.

In January 2026, the Nanjing Institute of Optics & Technology published a press release stating AST3-2 had completed its winter observations. The press release also states that over the course of one polar night, AST3-2 "remotely acquired 3.5 terabytes of observation data". This is comparable to 1000 hours of raw observations according to the release.

== See also ==
- List of astronomical observatories
- Lists of telescopes
