= Qu Tanzhou =

Qu Tanzhou (Chinese: 曲探宙) is the director of the Chinese Arctic and Antarctic Administration.

In 2007 Qu Tanzhou was the director of China's Polar Office of the State Oceanic Administration.

According to an article published in the January 2010 edition of The Age, Qu Tanzhou was part of a high-level delegation of senior officials that traveled to the Antarctic, led by Xu Shaoshi, China's Minister for Land and Resources. The delegation travelled aboard the Xue Long, China's icebreaker.

Jo Chandler, writing in The Age, interviewed Qu when he visited Australia's Antarctic Casey Station.

- "At this stage, we are paying attention to climate and environmental change … [looking at] oceanography, geography, [evidence of] meteorites."
- "Also, we are here about the potential of the resources and how to use these resources."
