= Antarctic Plateau =

Plateau of East Antarctica

Coordinates: 77°00′S 150°00′E

Antarctic Plateau Polar Plateau, King Haakon VII Plateau
- Plateau
- Interactive map of Antarctic Plateau
- Location: East Antarctica
- Elevation: 3,000 m (9,800 ft)

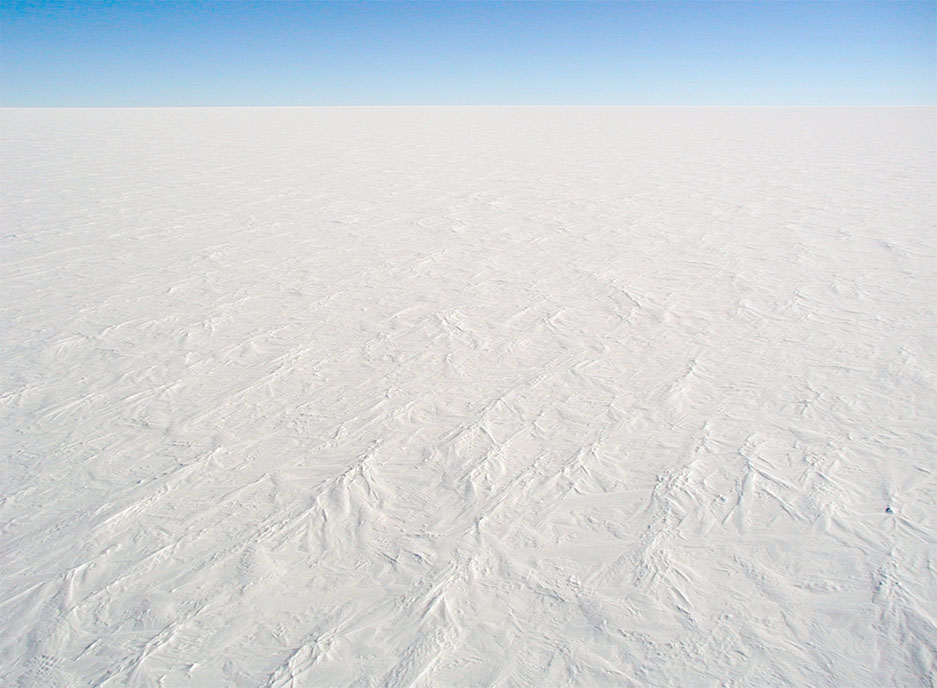
The high, flat, and cold environment of the Antarctic Plateau at Dome C

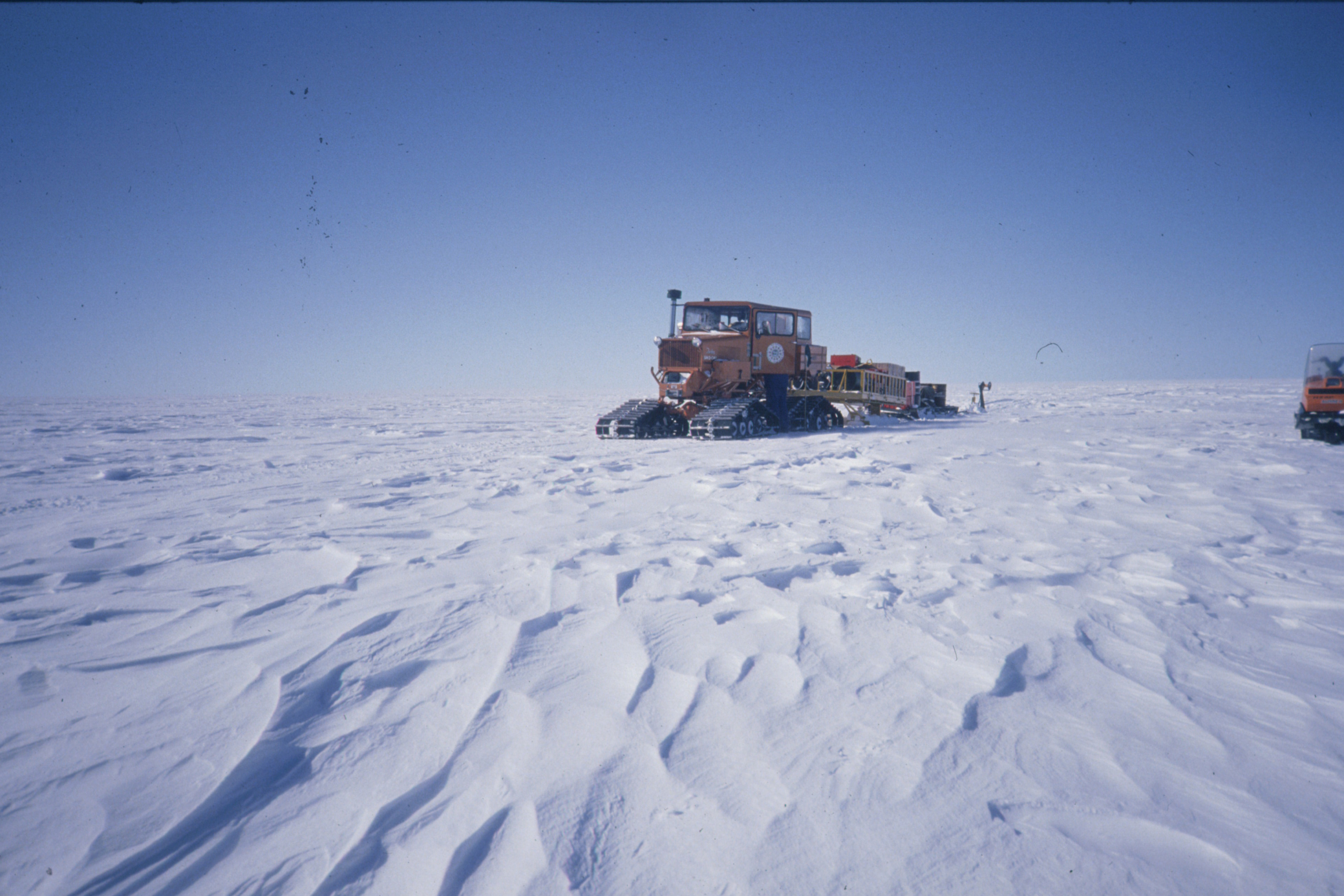
Surface of Antarctic Plateau, at 150E, 77S

The Antarctic Plateau, Polar Plateau or King Haakon VII Plateau is a large area of East Antarctica that extends over a diameter of about 1,000 kilometres (620 mi), and includes the region of the geographic South Pole and the Amundsen–Scott South Pole Station. This huge continental plateau is at an average elevation of about 3,000 metres (9,800 ft).

== Exploration ==
This plateau was first sighted in 1903 during the Discovery Expedition to the Antarctic, which was led by Robert Falcon Scott. Ernest Shackleton became the first to cross parts of this plateau in 1909 during his Nimrod Expedition, which turned back in bad weather when it had reached a point 97 nautical miles (180 km; 112 mi) from the South Pole. Shackleton named this plateau the King Edward VII Plateau in honour of the king of the United Kingdom. In December 1911, while returning from the first journey to the South Pole, the Norwegian explorer Roald Amundsen decided to name this plateau the King Haakon VII Plateau in honour of the newly elected king of Norway.

The Antarctic Plateau was first observed and photographed from the air in 1929 by a Ford Trimotor aeroplane carrying four men on the first flight to the South Pole and back to the seacoast. The chief pilot of this flight was Bernt Balchen, a native of Norway, and the navigator and chief organizer of this expedition was Richard E. Byrd of Virginia, an officer in the U.S. Navy. The other two members of its crew were the co-pilot and the photographer.

== Climate ==
The high elevations of the Antarctic Plateau, combined with its high latitudes and its extremely long, sunless winters, mean that the temperatures here are the lowest in the world in most years, falling as low as −92 °C (−134 °F).

== Fauna ==
The nearly continuous frigid winds that blow across the Antarctic Plateau, especially in the austral winter, make the environment inhospitable to life.

Microbial abundance is low (<103 cells/ml of snowmelt). The microbial community is mainly composed of members of the Alphaproteobacteria class (e.g. Kiloniellaceae and Rhodobacteraceae), which is one of the most well-represented bacterial groups in marine habitats; Bacteroidota (e.g. Cryomorphaceae and Flavobacteriaceae); and Cyanobacteria. According to research, polar microorganisms should be considered as not only deposited airborne particles, but also as active components of the snowpack ecology of the Antarctic Plateau.

No penguins live on the Antarctic Plateau, and few birds routinely fly over it, except mostly Antarctic petrels, snow petrels and south polar skuas. There are very few land animals anywhere on the plateau, or the Antarctic in general; nematodes, springtails, mites, midges, humans and dogs.

== See also ==
- Amundsen–Scott South Pole Station
- Dome A
- Dome C
  - Concordia Station
- Dome F
- East Antarctic Ice Sheet
- Gamburtsev Mountain Range
- Plateau Station
- Pole of Inaccessibility (Antarctic research station)
- Ridge A
- Roald Amundsen
- Vostok Station
