= Icelandic Centre for Research =

Scientific research organisation in Iceland

- Rannsóknamiðstöð Íslands (RANNÍS)
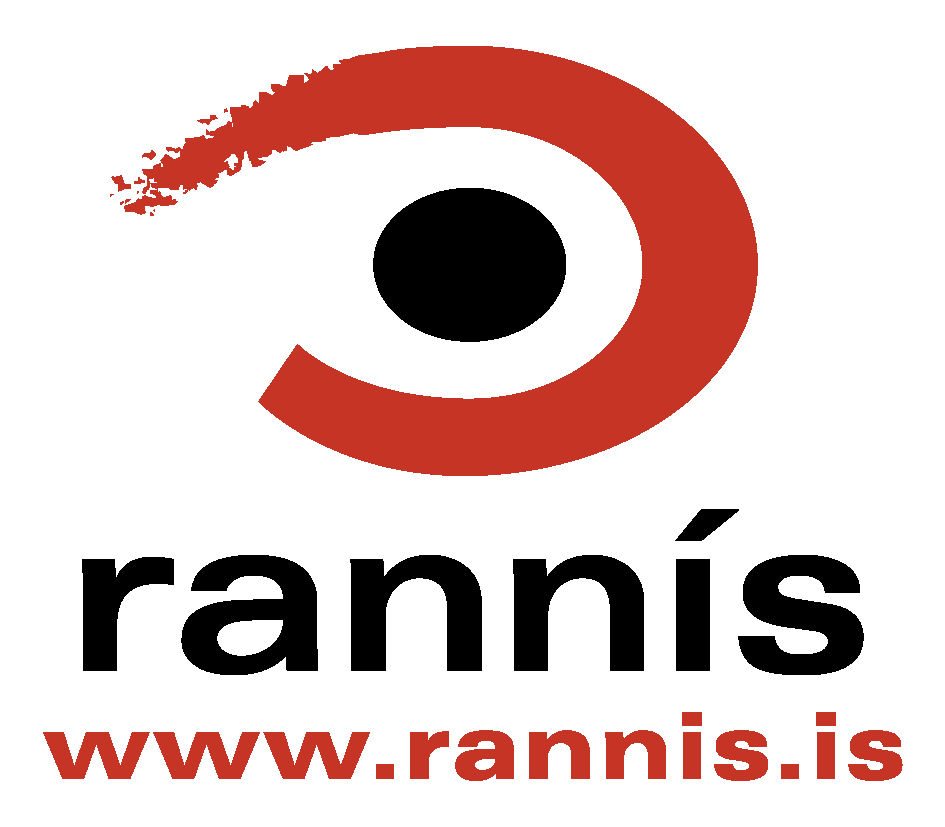
- Logo since 2003

Agency overview
- Formed: 2003; 23 years ago
- Headquarters: 64.1457°N 21.8956°W
- Annual budget: 15 Billion ISK (2018)
- Minister responsible: Logi Már Einarsson, Minister of Industries and Innovation
- Agency executive: Ágúst Hjörtur Ingþórsson, Director
- Website: rannis.is

The Icelandic Centre for Research (RANNÍS; Icelandic: Rannsóknamiðstöð Íslands) funds and promotes scientific research in Iceland. It formed in 2003 through an act of legislation. As of April 1 2022, the Ministry of Higher Education, Science and Innovation oversees its activities. It operates from headquarters in Borgartún 30 in Reykjavík.

RANNÍS cooperates closely with the Icelandic Science and Technology Policy Council and provides professional assistance in the preparation and implementation of the national science and technology policy. RANNÍS administers competitive funds in the fields of research, innovation, education and culture, as well as strategic research programmes. RANNÍS coordinates and promotes Icelandic participation in European programmes such, as Horizon Europe in the fields of research and innovation, Erasmus+ in the fields of education, training, youth and sport, and Creative Europe in the fields of culture and audiovisual media. In addition, RANNÍS monitors resources and performance in R&D and promotes public awareness of research and innovation, education and culture in Iceland.

== History ==
From 1994 to 2003, RANNÍS operated as the Icelandic Research Council. "As of 2013 scientific publications based on projects, funded entirely or partially by the Icelandic Centre for Research, Rannís, must be published in open access."

== Funds ==
Through the research fund Rannis provides funding for domestic projects, and salaries for doctoral students.
