= Inexpressible Island =

Island of Antarctica

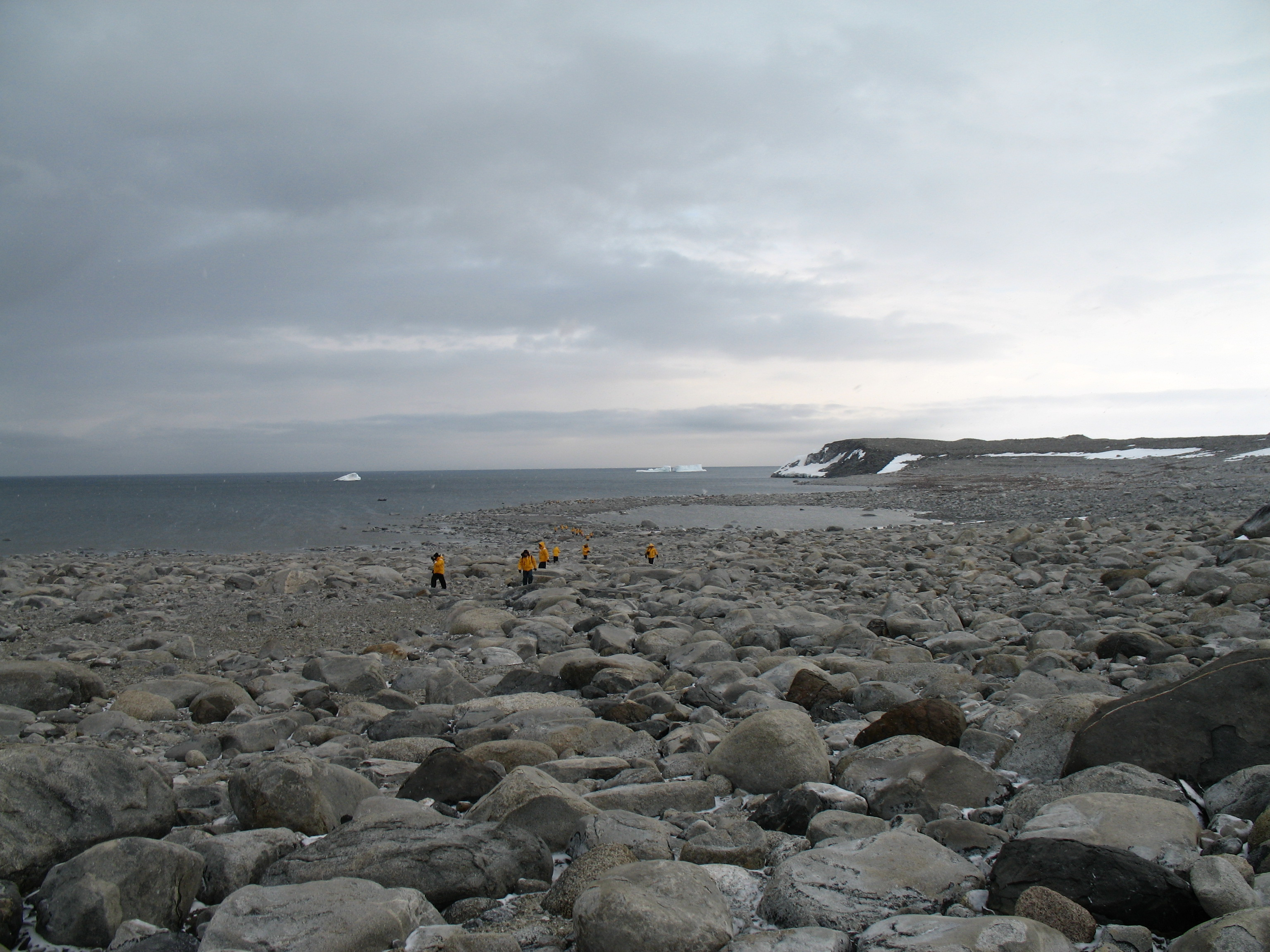
- A view over Inexpressible Island

- Location within Antarctica

Geography
- Location: Antarctica
- Coordinates: 74°54′S 163°39′E

Administration
- Administered under the Antarctic Treaty System

Demographics
- Population: Summer: 80, Winter: 30

Inexpressible Island is a small, rocky island in Terra Nova Bay, Victoria Land, Antarctica. Previously uninhabited, the Chinese Qinling research station on the southern edge of the island became operational in 2024.

== Description ==
The island is bounded in the east by Evans Cove and the Hells Gate Moraine, and in the west by the Nansen Ice Sheet. The eastern side is relatively flat with a few low hills, while a 110 m high ridge marks the western side. Several lakes are present.

== History ==
Robert Falcon Scott's Terra Nova Expedition (1910–1913) comprised several groups. One of these, the Northern Party, led by Victor Campbell, did not accompany Scott into the interior but wintered at Cape Adare. In 1912, that group (composed of six men in total), began the long journey homewards and began making their way to Cape Evans (via Hut Point). However, they were dropped at Evans Coves with sledging provisions for six weeks with the intention of completing geological work. After the work was done they were left with rations for about four weeks, as it was not anticipated the ship would have trouble picking them up later in February. But the Terra Nova could not reach them due to heavy pack ice. Unable to connect with their ship, the Northern Party was forced to winter in Antarctica again. In March 1912 the party excavated a small 3.7-by-2.7-metre (12 by 9 ft) ice cave in a snow drift they nicknamed "Inexpressible Island" where they spent the winter in miserable conditions, supplementing their rations by killing scarce seal and penguins for meat.

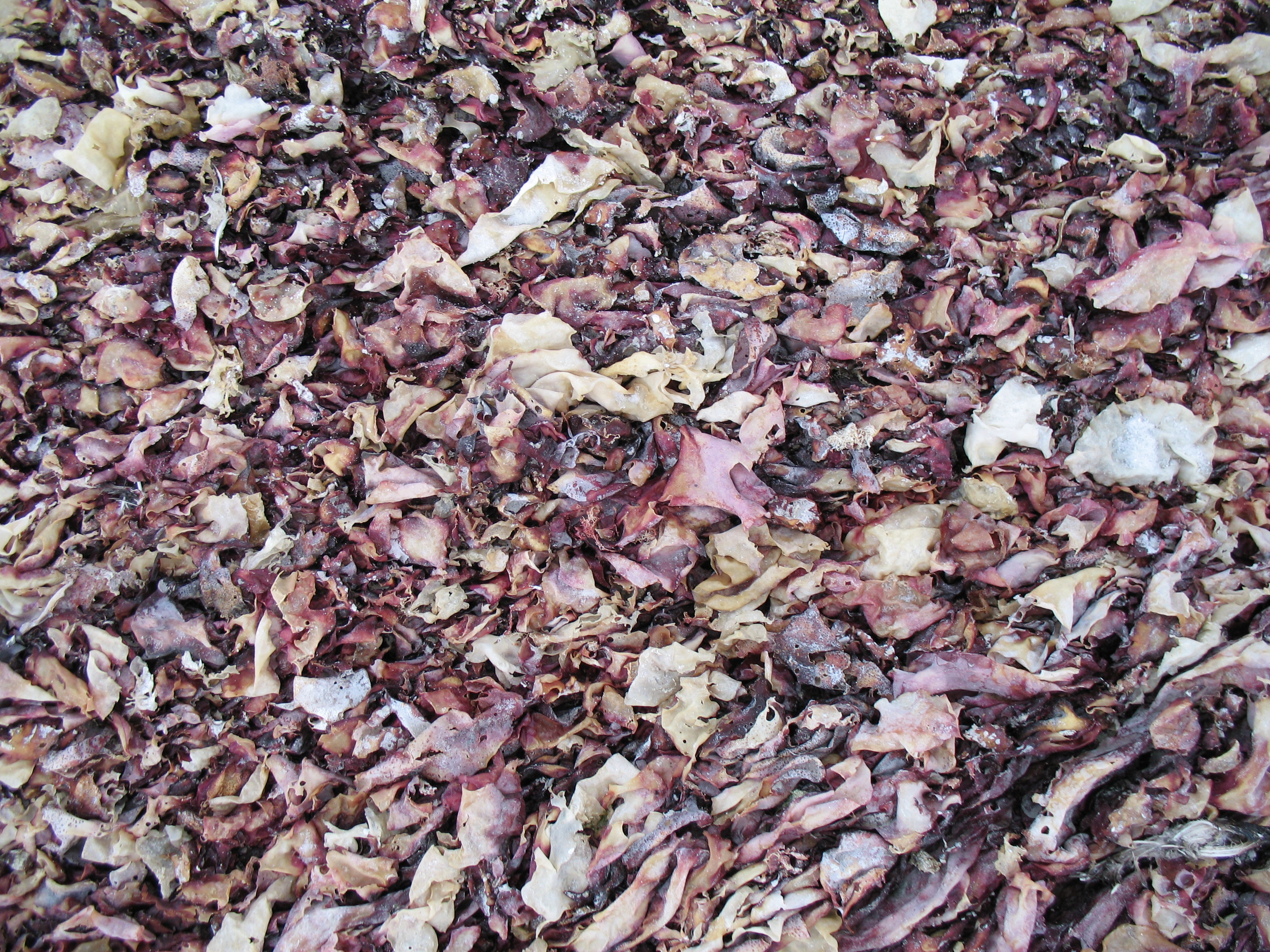
Seaweed on Inexpressible Island.

The Northern Party had previously built a supply depot at Hells Gate Moraine (74° 52'S, 163° 50'E) on Inexpressible Island as a form of security should the Terra Nova be unable to collect them. The depot primarily consisted of a sledge loaded with supplies and equipment. Despite the fact that this depot had been built, the winter spent in the ice cave and a partially constructed rock shelter on Inexpressible Island was miserable. The men suffered frostbite, hunger, dysentery, and the abominable winds on the island. As ship doctor George Murray Levick said:

"The road to hell might be paved with good intentions, but it seemed probable that hell itself would be paved something after the style of Inexpressible Island."

The men started home for Hut Point on September 30, 1912, some two hundred miles down the coast, which would include the crossing of the Drygalski Ice Tongue. Browning was very ill and Dickason almost crippled by dysentery. They reached Hut Point on November 5.

=== Historic site ===
The site of the ice cave where Victor Campbell's Northern Party wintered has been designated a Historic Site or Monument (HSM 14), following a proposal by New Zealand to the Antarctic Treaty Consultative Meeting. A wooden sign, a plaque and seal bones remain at the site.

== Qinling Station ==
In February 2024, the Qinling research station on the southern edge of the island was opened by the People's Republic of China. The Center for Strategic and International Studies, an American think tank, reported that the station was expected to include an observatory with a satellite ground station, and that the equipment could be used to collect signals intelligence and for tracking rockets launched from the Arnhem Space Centre in Australia. China rejected claims that the station would be used for espionage.

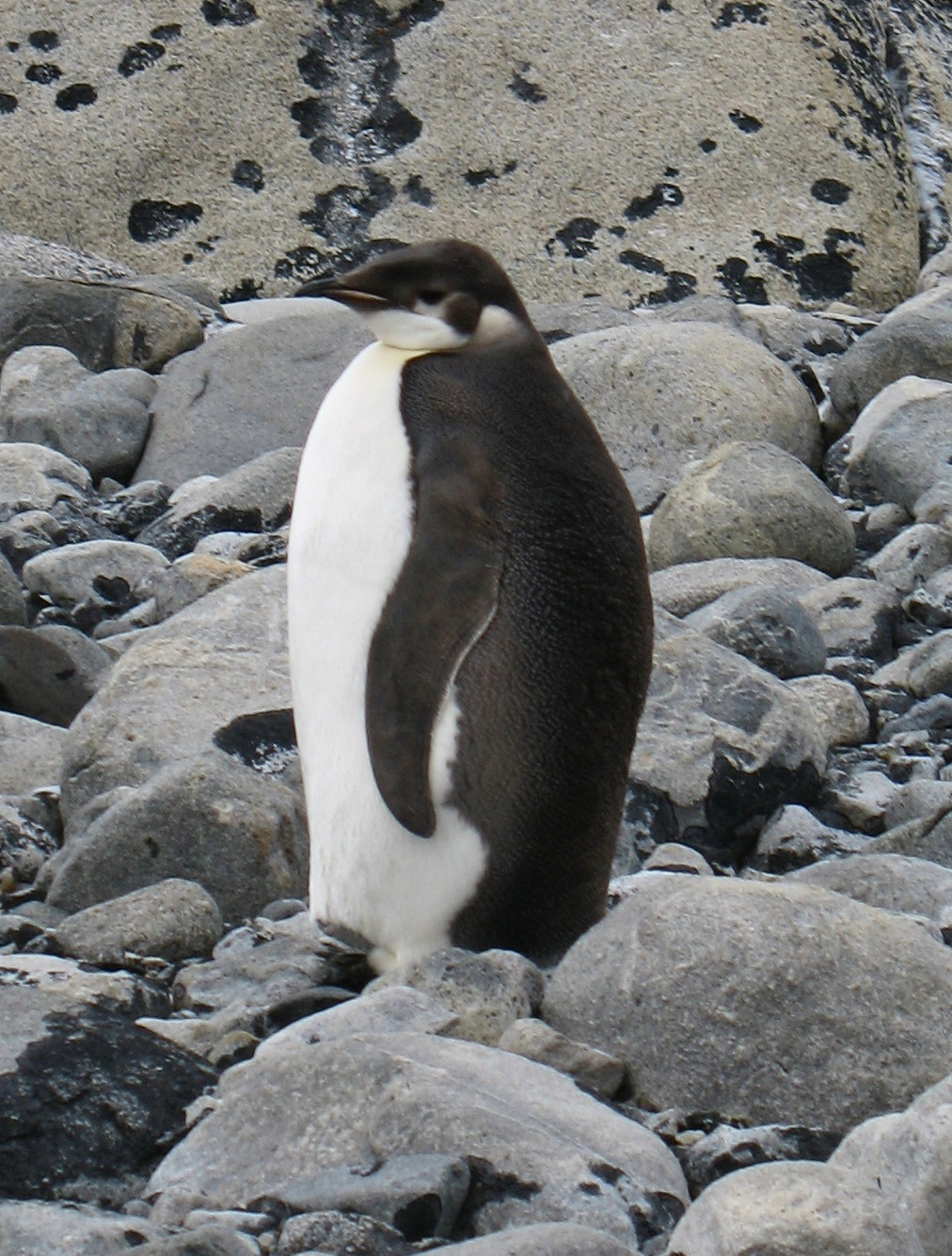
An emperor penguin on Inexpressible Island

== Important Bird Area ==
A 365-hectare (900-acre) site comprising ice-free ground on the eastern shore of the island has been designated an Important Bird Area (IBA) by BirdLife International, because it supports about 24,000 breeding pairs of Adélie penguins and some 60 pairs of south polar skuas which breed in the vicinity of the penguin colony. Weddell seals have been seen on sea ice near the island.

== See also ==
- Composite Antarctic Gazetteer
- List of Antarctic and Subantarctic islands
- List of Antarctic islands south of 60° S
- SCAR
- Territorial claims in Antarctica
