= Dome A =

Ice dome in Antarctica

- Dome Argus
- Location within Antarctica

Highest point
- Elevation: 4,087 m (13,409 ft)
- Prominence: 1,338 m (4,390 ft)
- Listing: Ribu
- Coordinates: 80°22′S 77°21′E

Geography
- Location: Antarctica

Dome A or Dome Argus is the highest ice dome on the Antarctic Plateau. Located 1,200 km (750 mi) inland. It is thought to be the coldest naturally occurring place on Earth, with temperatures reaching −90 to −98 °C (−130 to −144 °F). It is the highest ice feature in Antarctica, consisting of an ice dome 4,087 m (13,409 ft) above sea level. It is located near the center of East Antarctica, approximately midway between the enormous head of Lambert Glacier and the geographic South Pole, within the Australian claim.

== Description ==
Dome Argus is located on the massive East Antarctic Ice Sheet and is the highest ice feature of Antarctica. Dome A is a lofty ice prominence, the highest rooftop of the Antarctic Plateau, and the elevation visually is not noticeable. Below this enormous dome, underneath at least 2,400 m (7,900 ft) of ice sheet, lies the Gamburtsev Mountain Range, about the size of the European Alps.

The name "Dome Argus" was given by the Scott Polar Research Institute from Greek mythology. Argus built the ship Argo, in which Jason and the Argonauts traveled to Colchis in search of the Golden Fleece.

This site is one of the driest locations on Earth and receives 1 to 3 cm (0.4 to 1.2 in) of snow per year. Due to this, as well as calm weather, this site is an excellent location to obtain ice core samples for the research of past climates. Temperatures at Dome A fall below −80 °C (−112 °F) almost every winter.

== Exploration ==
Details of the morphology of this feature were determined by the SPRI-NSF-TUD airborne radio echo sounding program between the years 1967 and 1979.

In January 2005 a team from the Chinese National Antarctic Research Expeditions (CHINARE) traversed 1,228 km (763 mi) from Zhongshan Station to Dome A and located the highest point of the ice sheet (4,093 m (13,428 ft) above sea level) by GPS survey at 80°22′S 77°21′E on January 18. This point is near one end of an elongated ridge (about 60 km (37 mi) long and 10 km (6.2 mi) wide), which is a major ice divide and has an elevation difference along its length of only a few meters. An automatic weather station (AWS) was deployed at Dome A, and a second station was installed approximately halfway between the summit and the coast at a site called Eagle (76°25′S 77°01′E, 2830 m above sea level). These AWS are operated as part of an ongoing collaboration between China and Australia and include a third AWS (LGB69) at 70°50′S 77°04′E, 1,854 m (6,083 ft) above sea level, which has operated since January 2002. The station at Dome A is powered by solar cells and diesel fuel and requires yearly service and refuelling.

== Extreme temperatures ==
The coldest air temperature recorded by thermometer at Dome A since January 2005 was −82.5 °C (−116.5 °F) in July 2005. This may have been beaten by an unconfirmed reading of −82.7 °C (−116.9 °F) in June 2019. The lowest surface temperature ever measured on the surface of the Earth (−93.2 °C (−135.8 °F)) was recorded by satellite on August 10, 2010, between Dome Argus and Dome Fuji. Analysis of satellite data and atmospheric models shows that Ridge A, which is located 144 km (89 mi) southeast of Dome A, is potentially an even better location to look for the lowest temperatures on Earth.

== Observatory ==
The Polar Research Institute of China deployed a robotic observatory called PLATO (PLATeau Observatory) on the dome in January 2008. PLATO was designed and built by the University of New South Wales, Sydney, Australia to provide a platform from which astronomical observations and site-testing could be conducted. Various institutions from Australia, US, China and the UK provided instruments that were deployed with PLATO, these instruments included CSTAR, Gattini, PreHEAT, Snodar, Nigel and the PLATO web cameras.

The Institute of Remote Sensing Applications, Chinese Academy of Sciences established a wireless network technology based observation system called Dome A-WSN on the dome in January 2008.

The Kunlun Station, China's third station in Antarctica, was set up at the dome on January 27, 2009. Thus far the Antarctic Kunlun Station is suitable as a summer station, but there are plans to develop it further and build an airfield nearby to ease servicing, as it is not reachable by helicopters.

== See also ==
- Pole of Cold
- Pole of Inaccessibility
- Ridge A
- Dome C (also known as Dome Circe, Dome Charlie or Dome Concordia)
- Dome F (also known as Dome Fuji or Valkyrie Dome)
- East Antarctica Ranges
- List of ultras of Antarctica
