= Zhongshan Station (Antarctica) =

Zhongshan Station 中山站
- Antarctic base
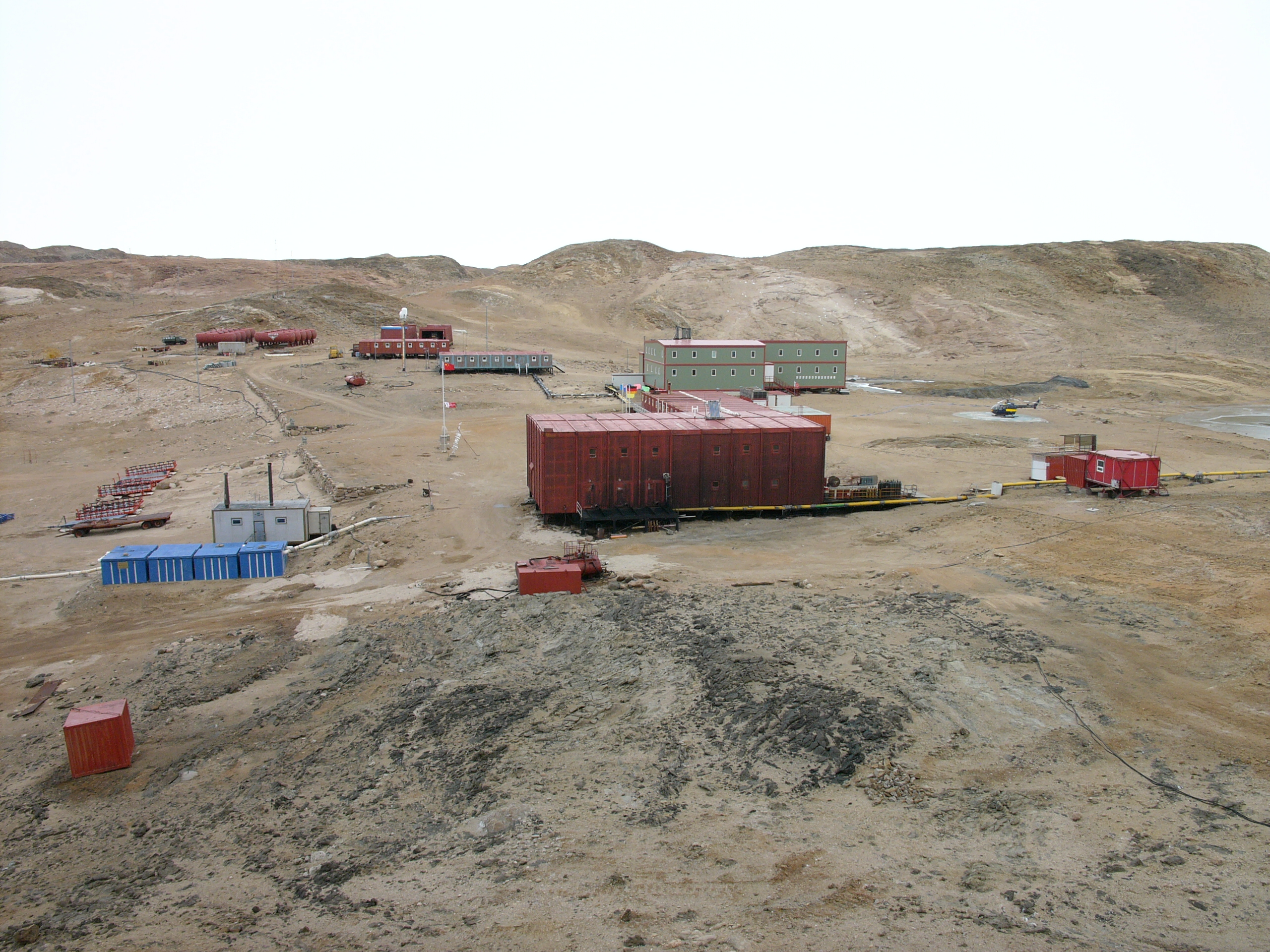
- Zhongshan Station in 2007

- Location of Zhongshan Station in Antarctica
- Coordinates: 69°22′25″S 76°22′18″E
- Country: China
- Location in Antarctica: Larsemann Hills; Prydz Bay; East Antarctica
- Administered by: Polar Research Institute of China
- Established: 26 February 1989
- Elevation: 11 m (36 ft)

Population (2017)
  - Summer: 60
  - Winter: 17
- UN/LOCODE: AQ ZGN
- Type: All-year round
- Period: Annual
- Status: Operational
- Activities: List: Glaciology; Geology
- Website: Chinese Arctic and Antarctic

Zhongshan Station (Chinese: 中山站; pinyin: Zhōngshān Zhàn) is the second Chinese research station in Antarctica and was opened on 26 February 1989.

== Overview ==
Zhongshan Station is named after Sun Yat-sen, who served as the provisional first president of the Republic of China in 1912. It is managed by the Polar Research Institute of China (PRIC). It is located in the Larsemann Hills by Prydz Bay in East Antarctica, and is near the Russian Progress II Station and the Romanian Law-Racoviță-Negoiță Station.

The station can accommodate 60 summering personnel and 25 wintering personnel. It is a base for research on marine, glaciological, geological, and atmospheric sciences and for expeditions inland, such as to the Kunlun Station at Dome A. It is supplied by annual visits of the support vessel Xue Long. The station also hosts a ground station build by China Aerospace Science and Industry Corporation.

== History ==
Four years after establishing the Great Wall Station, China's first research base in Antarctica, Guo Kun led another expedition to Antarctica, with the mission to establish a second base. The team set out from Qingdao in November 1988 on the ship Jidi. After reaching Prydz Bay in Antarctica, the ship encountered a major icefall in the night of 14 January 1989. She missed being directly hit by ice by just two or three meters, and became trapped by icebergs for seven days. Many team members wrote their wills and were ready to die. The icebergs shifted on the seventh day and temporarily created a 30-meter-wide opening, and the team escaped. The opening lasted for just two hours before being closed again. The team proceeded to construct the Zhongshan Station at Prydz Bay in only 28 days, and it was opened on 26 February 1989.

In January 2010, the station was visited by a delegation that included Xu Shaoshi, China's Minister for Land and Resources and Qu Tanzhou, director of the Chinese Arctic and Antarctic Administration.

== See also ==
- Australian Antarctic Territory
- List of Antarctic research stations
- List of Antarctic field camps
