= Yellow River Station =

Chinese research station in Ny-Ålesund, on Svalbard

- 中国北极黄河站
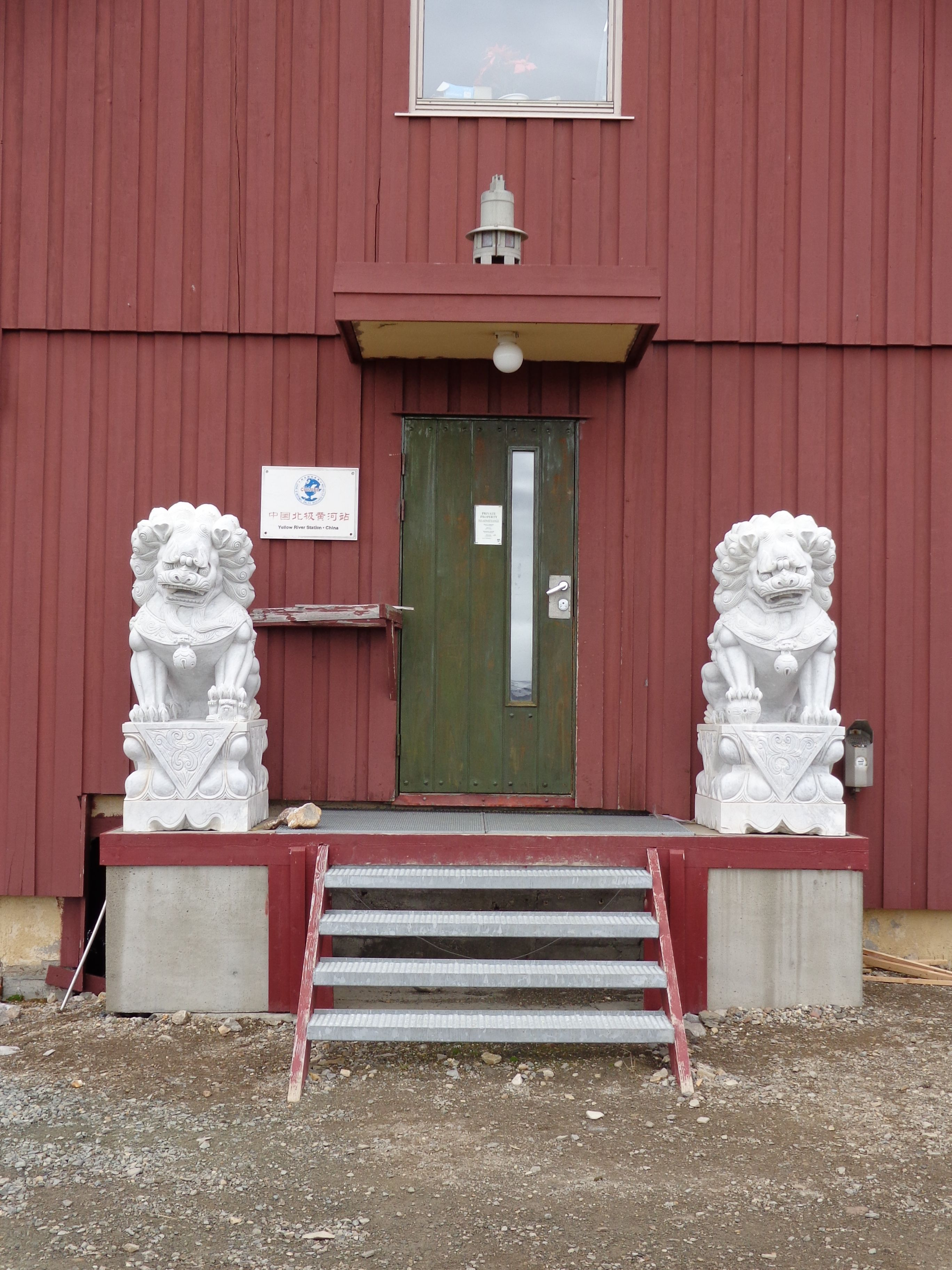
- Interactive map of the Yellow River Station area

General information
- Location: Ny-Ålesund, Svalbard, Norway
- Coordinates: 78.9232°N 11.9345°E
- Opened: 2003
- Owner: Government of China

The Yellow River Station (Chinese: 黄河站; pinyin: Huánghé Zhàn) is a scientific research station of the People's Republic of China in the Arctic, located in Ny-Ålesund, Svalbard, a remote archipelago under the sovereign control of Norway.

The Yellow River Station is a permanent research station, operating year-round with accommodations for 18 staff members, hosting approximately 50 researchers per year.

== History ==
The station was established by the Polar Research Institute of China (PRIC), an agency under China's Ministry of Natural Resources (MNR) in 2003. The Yellow River Station was China's first permanent research station in the Arctic. Its laboratories study and gather data on areas including meteorology, glaciology, marine ecosystems, the environment, and weather patterns. According to the PRIC, scientists at the station conduct research into the Aurora Borealis, microbes in the ice-pack, glacier monitoring, arctic biogeochemistry, and atmospheric research. 2024 research conducted at the Yellow River Station included scientific projects in the fields of glaciology, terrestrial and marine ecology, and space physics.

Svalbard is considered a key location in China's Arctic ambitions. In 2001, China established its first temporary Arctic research station in the Svalbard town of Longyearbyen, located on Spitsbergen Island, which is located between the Norwegian mainland and the North Pole. The establishment of the permanent Yellow River Station in Ny-Ålesund followed three years later. However, some of China's more recent attempts to expand its presence in Svalbard have been blocked. In 2024, an attempt by China to purchase the Søre Fagerfjord property in south-west Svalbard, the last private land on the Svalbard archipelago, was denied by the Norwegian government, with the Norwegian trade and industry minister stating that current owners were "open to selling to actors that could challenge Norwegian legislation in Svalbard", and that the sale could "disturb stability in the region and potentially threaten Norwegian interests”.

== Intelligence concerns ==
Concerns have been raised about potential dual use of the station such as its use in gathering military intelligence. Experts have warned that it is difficult to ascertain end users of the research performed based on data collected at the Yellow River Station since the data can be sent back to China for remote analysis and research. The dual use applications of scientific research reflect the Chinese Communist Party (CCP) doctrine of military-civil fusion, the principle that Chinese civilian and commercial sectors must serve the CCP's national security objectives. The China Research Institute of Radio Wave Propagation (CRIRP), a research arm under the state-owned China Electronics Technology Group Corporation (CETC), the largest military electronics conglomerate in the People's Republic of China, operates at the Yellow River Station. Research conducted by CRIRP in Svalbard includes EISCAT, atmospheric and ionospheric observation, and ionospheric scintillation. The CRIRP also runs the National Defense Key Laboratory of Electromagnetic Environment, a national-level defense laboratory that conducts classified military research. A 2024 Newsweek investigation found that the CRIRP collaborated with a researcher at the People's Liberation Army (PLA) University of Science and Technology, using the data collected from Svalbard to study missile guidance. China currently has over 20 active research projects on Svalbard, including the development of automated unmanned observation systems, atmospheric and ionospheric observation, microbial corrosion of marine materials in extreme environments, and EISCAT projects.

The Svalbard archipelago is under the sovereign control of Norway, per the Svalbard Treaty. According to the Svalbard Treaty, military actions and symbolism are forbidden on Svalbard.

According to experts, even national symbols are expected to be kept to a minimum. However, there have been instances where the People's Republic of China has violated this requirement, which has drawn criticism in Norway, and added to concerns over the potential military uses of the station.

On July 28, 2024, to commemorate the 20th anniversary of the Yellow River Station, Newayer, a Chinese travel agency, chartered a vessel for 183 tourists to visit the station. During the visit, a woman in a People's Liberation Army (PLA) uniform and wearing a PLA ground forces patch, saluted and took pictures with the tourists. In a promotional social media video posted by Newayer, the woman, alongside eight other passengers, stated that they were veterans of the PLA, and the group performed a military salute as part of the celebrations.

According to reporting by Radio Free Asia (RFA) and Norsk rikskringkasting (NRK), the Norwegian Polar Institute, the governing authority on Svalbard, had denied the Yellow River Station's request to hang a celebratory banner a month prior to the event, however on the day it was displayed anyway, with the Institute noting in an internal report that the tourists were "well-prepared" with national symbols, including wearing red, and waving Chinese flags. In comments to NRK and RFA, the Institute stated that "Ny-Ålesund is a Norwegian research station, and we do not see it as useful for the various institutions that rent premises there to hang banners, as we want a unified research station". NRK also reported that when requested for comment, the PRIC denied that the woman was wearing a PLA uniform, stating that it was a regular camouflage jacket, however the photographed uniform matches the Type-21 combat uniforms found on the PRC's Department of Defense website.

Despite this, the Chinese Embassy denied all wrongdoing when questioned by the Norwegian government about the incident.

== See also ==
- Arctic policy of China
- List of research stations in the Arctic
- Xue Long and Xue Long 2
- Military-civil fusion
