= Xue Long =

Chinese polar research vessel

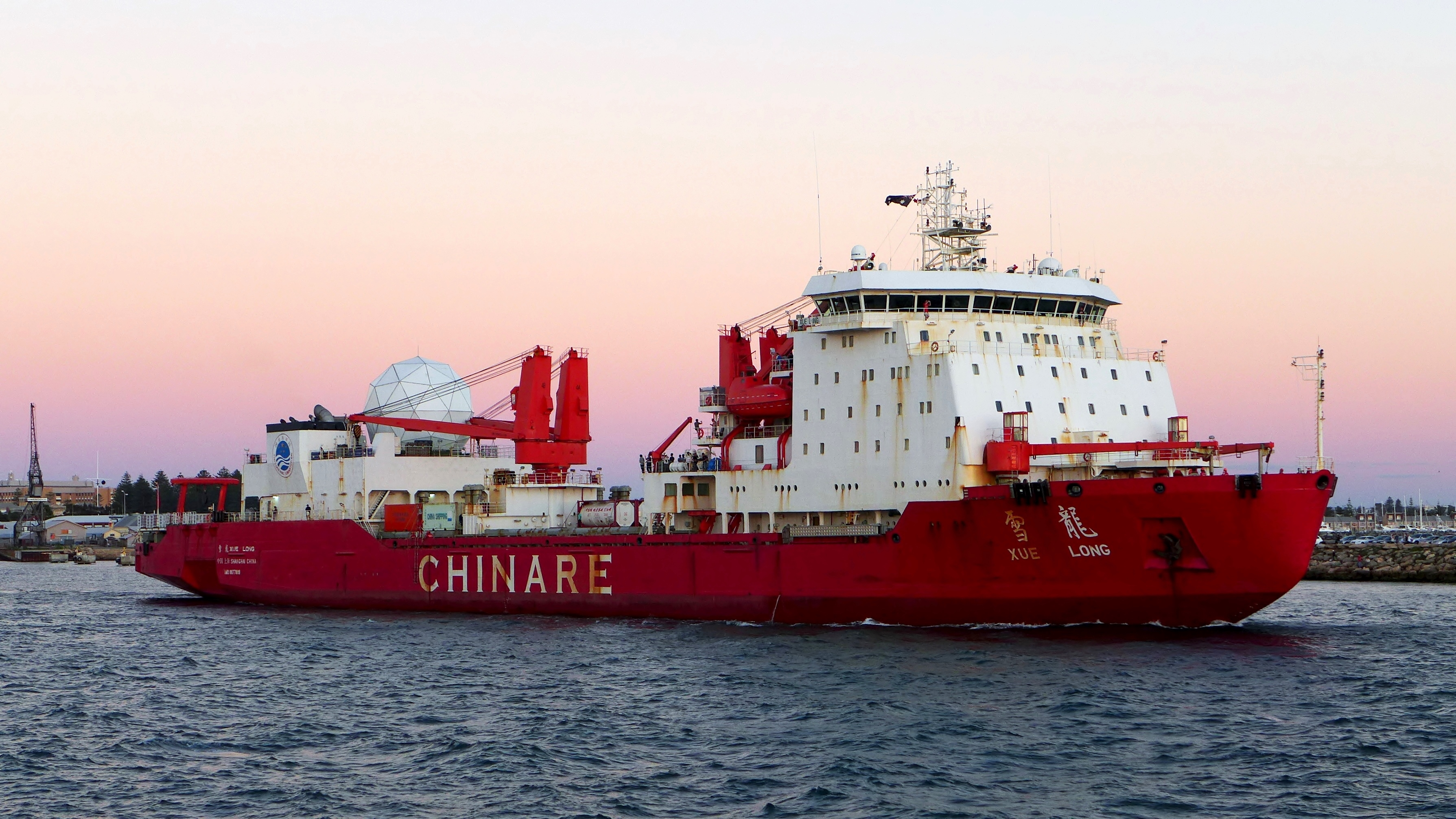
- Xue Long departing from Fremantle in March 2016

History

China
- Name: Xue Long (simplified Chinese: 雪龙; traditional Chinese: 雪龍; pinyin: Xuě Lóng)
- Operator: Polar Research Institute of China
- Port of registry: Shanghai, People's Republic of China
- Builder: Kherson Shipyard, Ukraine
- Yard number: 6003
- Laid down: 1 January 1990
- Completed: 1 March 1993
- Refit: 2007
- Identification: IMO number: 8877899; Call sign: BNSK; MMSI number: 412863000
- Status: In service

General characteristics
- Type: Research vessel
- Tonnage: 15,352 GT; 4,605 NT; 8,759 DWT
- Displacement: 21,025 tons
- Length: 167 m (548 ft)
- Beam: 22.6 m (74 ft)
- Draft: 9 m (30 ft)
- Ice class: CCS B1*
- Installed power: BMZ 8DKRN60/195 (13,200 kW) (1993–2013); Wärtsilä 6RT-flex60C (13,200 kW) (2013–)
- Propulsion: Single-shaft, ducted controllable-pitch propeller
- Speed: 18 knots (33 km/h; 21 mph) (max); 1.5 knots (2.8 km/h; 1.7 mph) in 1.1 m (3.6 ft) ice
- Range: 20,000 nautical miles (37,000 km; 23,000 mi)
- Complement: 34 crew, 128 passengers or researchers
- Aircraft carried: One helicopter (e.g. Kamov Ka-32A (Snow Eagle) used by Chinare or Harbin Z-9)
- Aviation facilities: Helipad
- Notes: 100 m^{2} (1,100 sq ft) laboratory space

Xue Long (simplified Chinese: 雪龙; traditional Chinese: 雪龍; pinyin: Xuě Lóng; lit. 'Snow Dragon', shway-lung) is a Chinese icebreaking research vessel. Built in 1993 at Kherson Shipyard in Ukraine, she was converted from an Arctic cargo ship to a polar research and re-supply vessel by Hudong–Zhonghua Shipbuilding of Shanghai by the mid-1990s. The vessel was extensively upgraded in 2007 and 2013.

Until 2019, Xue Long was the only Chinese icebreaking research ship in service. A second Chinese polar icebreaker named Xue Long 2, slightly smaller but more capable, entered service in July 2019.

== Description ==
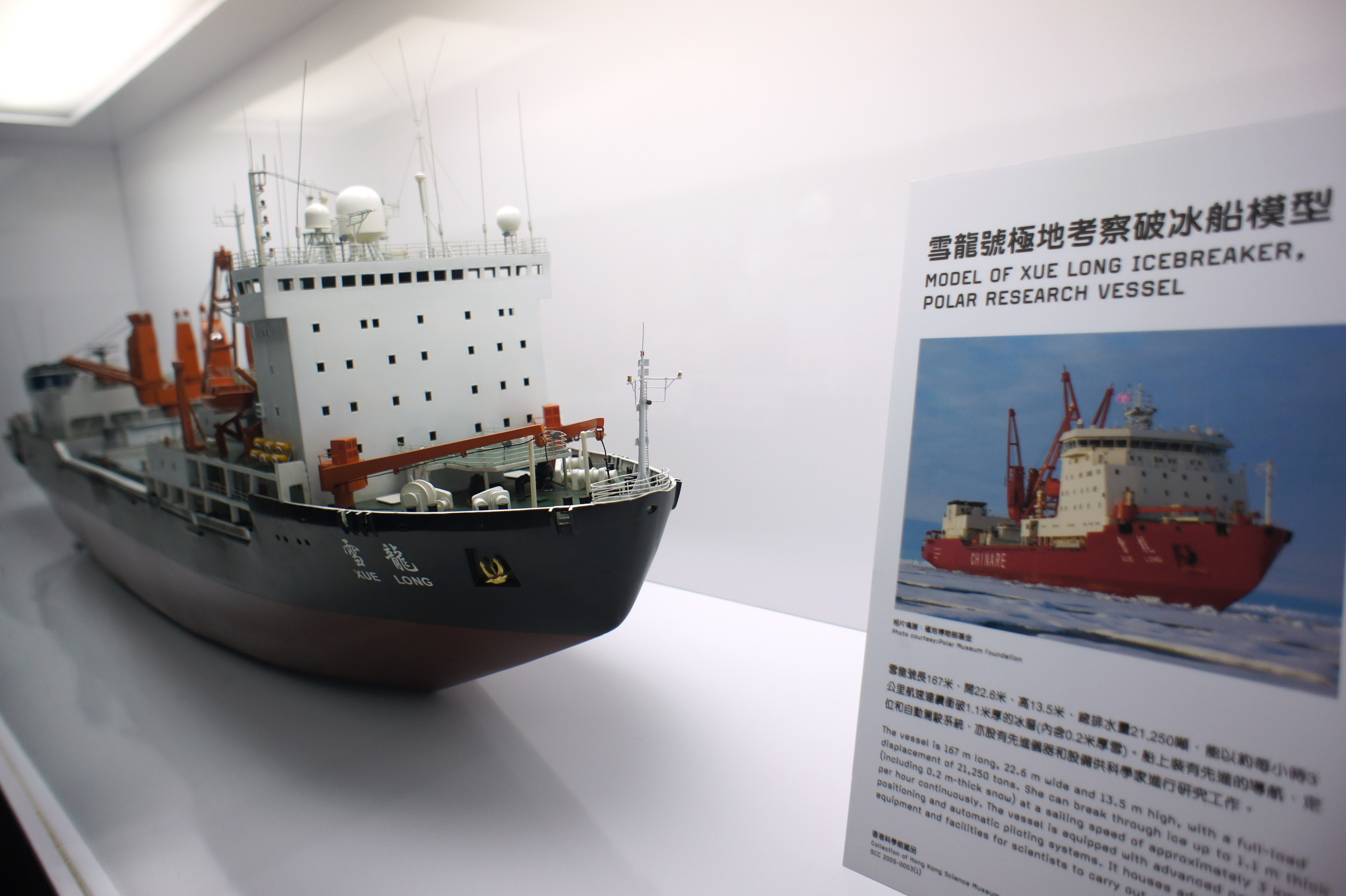
A model of Xue Long, showing her prior to the 2007 refit

Built at the Kherson Shipyard in Ukraine, Xue Long started her life as a Project 10621 icebreaking cargo and supply ship designed for the Russian Arctic. She was purchased by the People's Republic of China when the vessel's technical readiness level was 83% and completed as a polar research and re-supply vessel in 1994. In 2007, the ship was extensively upgraded to extend her service life by another 15 years. During the mid-life refit, the ship received a new superstructure that considerably changed her external appearance. She received another technical update in 2013 which included replacing her main engine.

Xue Long is 167 metres (548 ft) long and has a beam of 22.6 metres (74 ft). When loaded to a draft of 9 metres (30 ft), she has a displacement of 21,025 tons. The ship was originally powered by a single 8-cylinder BMZ 8DKRN60/195 low-speed, two-stroke diesel engine, a licence-built version of B&W 8L60MC, producing 13,200 kW (17,700 hp). During the 2013 refit, the main engine was replaced with an equally powered Wärtsilä 6RT-flex60C diesel engine. The main engine is coupled to a ducted controllable-pitch propeller. In open water, Xue Long can achieve a maximum speed of 18 knots (33 km/h; 21 mph) while in 1.1-metre (3.6 ft) ice she can proceed at 1.5 knots (2.8 km/h; 1.7 mph). Originally designed for the Soviet Arctic ice class ULA, the China Classification Society (CCS) has assigned her ice class B1*.

Xue Long has a crew of 34 and can accommodate 128 researchers or passengers. She has 100 square metres (1,100 sq ft) of laboratory space. In addition to a Kamov Ka-32 "Xueying" (Snow Eagle) helicopter, the ship also carries an Arctic-class ARV autonomous underwater vehicle on a regular basis.

== Career ==
=== Visit to Canada ===
Xue Long unexpectedly arrived in 1999 at the small Canadian coastal village of Tuktoyaktuk, on the Arctic Ocean.

The inability of the Canadian authorities to track the vessel stirred enough controversy that the incident is still being cited as evidence of Canadian unpreparedness to defend its northern sovereignty.

=== Arctic expeditions ===
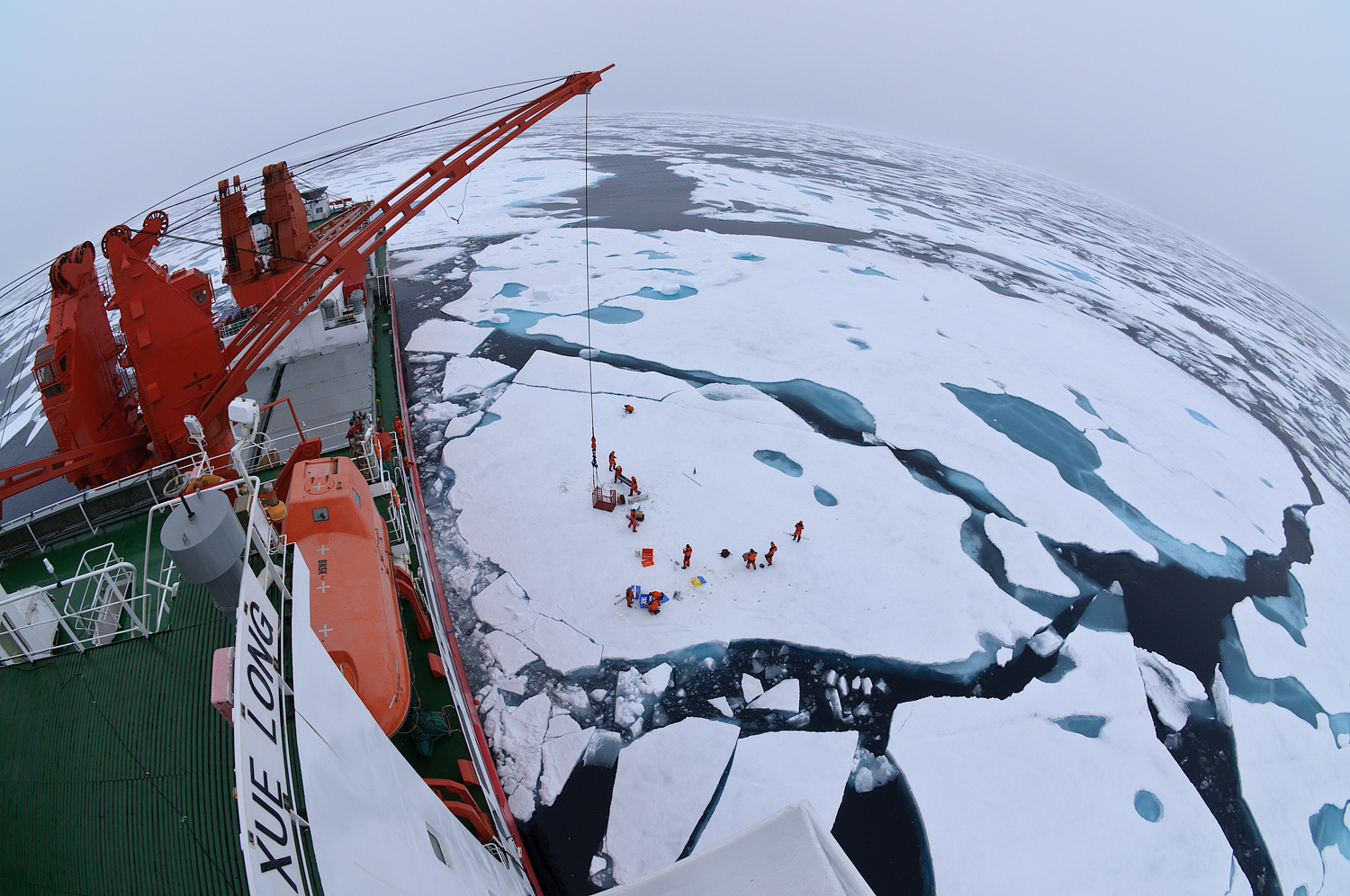
Drift ice camp in the middle of the Arctic Ocean as seen from the deck of icebreaker Xue Long

The ship undertook a second Arctic expedition from 15 July to 26 September 2003. More recently the ship had been used in connection with China's efforts to maintain a scientific presence in the Antarctic.

Although used primarily to support China's annual expeditions to Antarctica, Xue Long has made four voyages to the Arctic, via the Bering Strait in 1999, 2003, 2008 and summer 2010. During her 82-day voyage in July–September 2010, the ice-strengthened research ship was able to reach a new 'highest North' record (for China), reaching 88.22 degrees North latitude, at 177.20 degrees West longitude. At that point a team of scientists boarded the ship's Ka-32 helicopter and flew to the North Pole on 20 August 2010. The ship returned to Shanghai on 20 September 2010. At China's annual Polar conference held in Shanghai in September 2011, the director of the Antarctic & Arctic agency said that Xue Long would undertake her fifth voyage to the Arctic in July 2012.

==== Trans-Arctic voyage, 2012 ====
In the summer of 2012 Xue Long became the first ship from the People's Republic of China to cross the Arctic Ocean to Europe amid the record ice melt. The Xue Long left port on 2 July, sailed through the Bering Strait then joined a westbound convoy on the Northern Sea Route to the Barents Sea, before arriving in Iceland in mid-August. It departed Iceland on 20 August, sailed past Svalbard—without stopping to visit China's Arctic Yellow River Station—and made a run at the North Pole, falling short. It then sailed a high-latitude line east, back to the Bering Strait, returning to her base in Shanghai on 27 September 2012, completing its fifth Arctic voyage. "Unfortunately we didn't reach the North Pole because Xue Long's icebreaking capability isn't strong enough," said one of the ship's officers. The highest latitude reached on that voyage was 87°37' N.

==== Arctic circumnavigation, 2017 ====
In 2017, Xue Long circumnavigated the Arctic, transiting both Northern Sea Route and Northwest Passage.

=== Antarctic operations ===
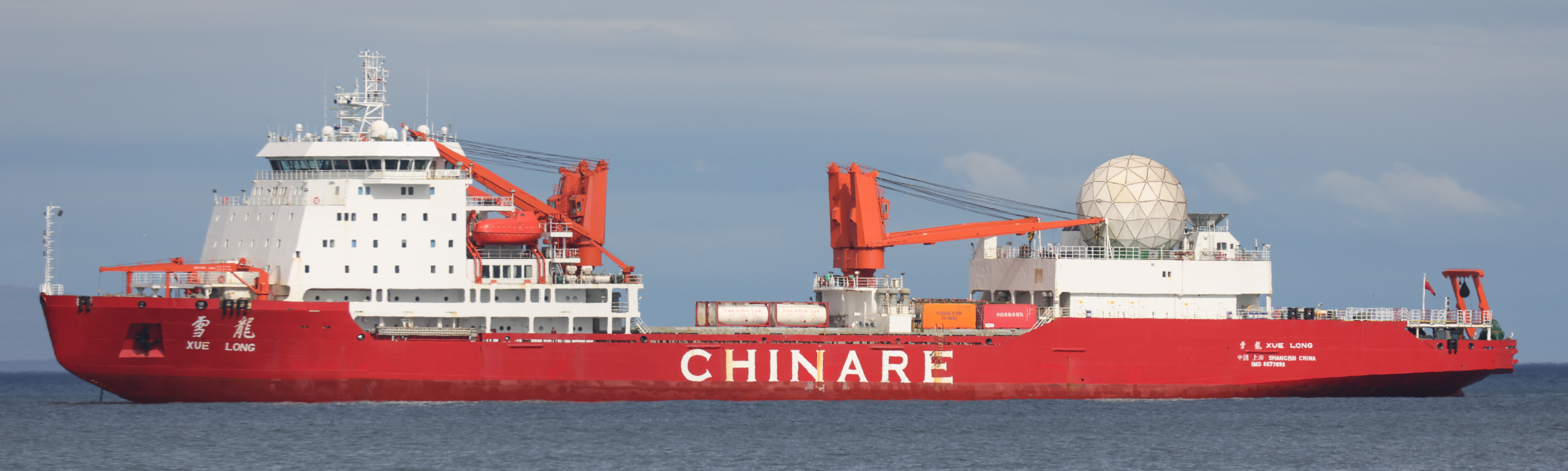
Xue Long in 2024

Xue Long provides annual resupply for China's Antarctic Zhongshan Station at Prydz Bay.

In January 2019, Xue Long hit an iceberg during sea fog whiteout in the Amundsen Sea and sustained damage when about 250 tonnes of ice fell on the ship. CCTV had video of sailors removing large blocks of ice, and China's Ministry of Natural Resources reported damage to the foredeck and mast.

==== Rescue operation of Akademik Shokalskiy, 2013–2014 ====
In December, 2013, Xue Long embarked on her first circumpolar voyage in Antarctic. It was heading eastward from Zhongshan Station when it was dispatched along with several other icebreakers by the Australian Maritime Safety Authority to free Akademik Shokalskiy which had become trapped in ice off the East Antarctic coast. By 27 December, Xue Long, closed to within 6 nautical miles of the Akademik Shokalskiy, but had stalled in its efforts to complete the rendezvous due to encountering thick ice. Xue Long withdrew to open water to rendezvous with and provide air support for Aurora Australis and L'Astrolabe. On 30 December, after all three icebreakers had failed to penetrate the icepack, a decision was reached to use Xue Long's helicopter to evacuate the 52 passengers off Akademik Shokalskiy, but the flights were grounded due to continuing extreme weather conditions. Originally, the plan was to have the helicopter ferry the passengers to a barge with which they would sail to the Aurora Australis, but the Xue Long became stuck in sea ice itself, unable to launch the barge.

On 2 January 2014 beginning at 18:15 Australian time (07:15 GMT) the Ka-32 helicopter from the Xue Long conducted five flights airlifting groups of 12 people from the ice next to the Akademik Shokalskiy and landing them on an ice floe near the Aurora Australis. Two additional flights were made to collect their equipment and baggage. The passengers were transferred to a small boat which took them to the Australian ship Aurora Australis as the Ka-32 helicopter is too heavy for the helipad of the Australian icebreaker. The airlift was completed within four hours. By 3 January, the Xue Long remained trapped in ice itself although it was in no immediate danger and her captain declined assistance from the still-nearby Aurora Australis. On 4 January 2014, the American icebreaker Polar Star was dispatched to assist Akademik Shokalskiy and Xue Long at request of the Chinese and Australian authorities. However, on 7 January 2014, a change of wind direction which loosened the icepack around the ships enabled Xue Long and Akademik Shokalskiy to work their own way free before the American ship arrived.

=== Search for Malaysia Airlines Flight 370 ===
Following the Akademik Shokalskiy rescue operation in the Antarctic, Xue Long docked in Perth, Western Australia. On 8 March 2014, Malaysia Airlines Flight 370 from Kuala Lumpur to Beijing disappeared. Satellite imagery from the Australian authorities led the search for the aircraft to an area in the Indian Ocean, approximately 2,500 km (1,600 mi) south-west of Perth. Due to its proximity to this area, Xue Long was dispatched to join the multinational search operation.

== See also ==
- Arctic policy of China
- Chinese Arctic and Antarctic Administration
- Yellow River Station (Arctic)
