= Xue Long 2 =

Chinese polar research vessel

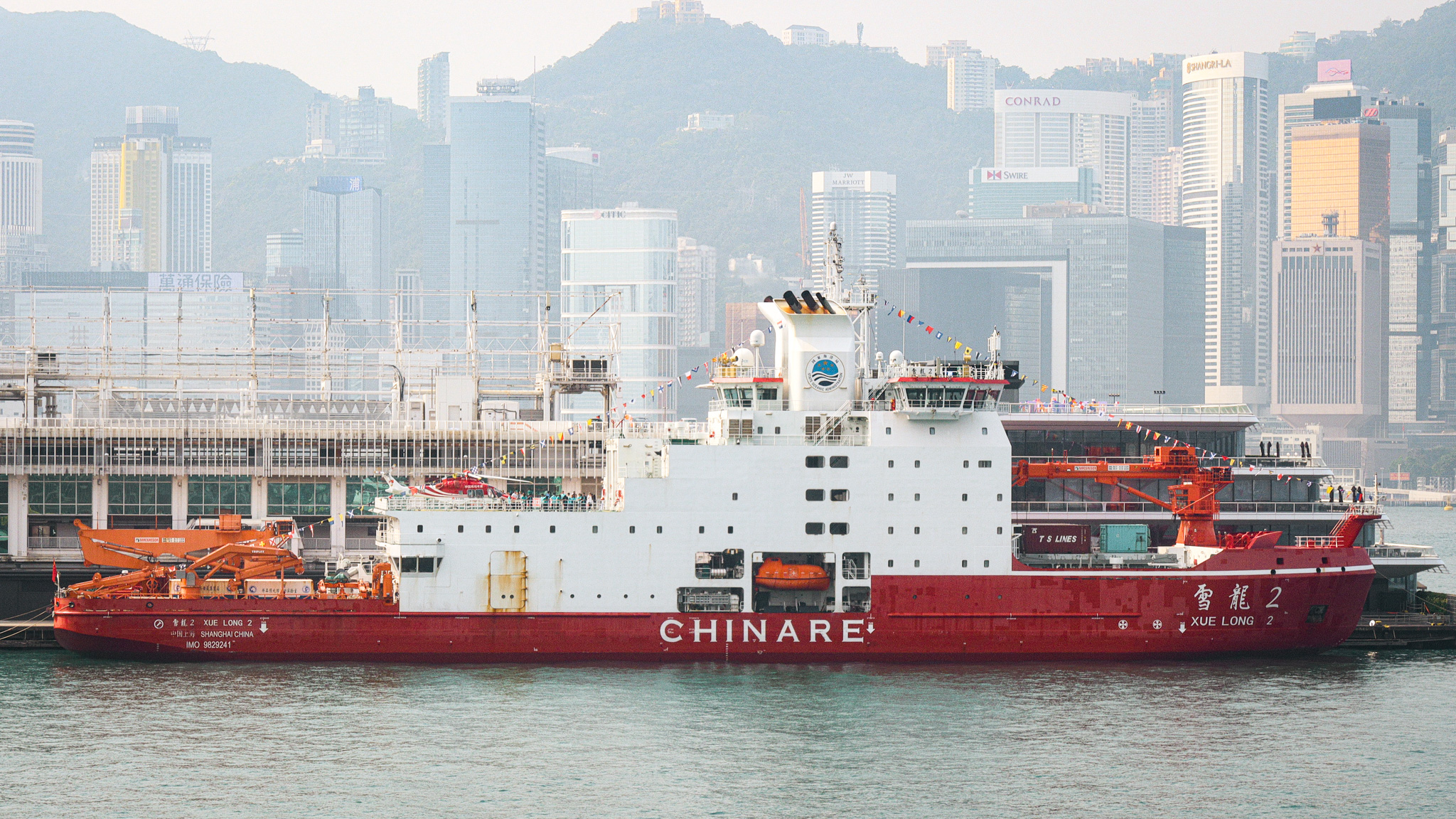
- Xue Long 2 at Victoria Harbour in 2024

History

China
- Name: Xue Long 2 (simplified Chinese: 雪龙2; traditional Chinese: 雪龍2; pinyin: Xuě Lóng 2)
- Owner: Polar Research Institute of China
- Port of registry: Shanghai, China
- Builder: Jiangnan Shipyard, Shanghai, China
- Yard number: H2650
- Launched: 10 September 2018
- Completed: 11 July 2019
- Identification: IMO number: 9829241
- Status: In service

General characteristics
- Type: Research vessel
- Displacement: 14,300 tons
- Length: 122.5 m (402 ft)
- Beam: 22.3 m (73 ft)
- Draught: 7.9 m (26 ft) (design); 8.3 m (27 ft) (maximum)
- Depth: 11.8 m (39 ft)
- Ice class: Polar Class 3
- Installed power: 2 × Wärtsilä 12V32; 2 × Wärtsilä 8L32
- Propulsion: Diesel-electric; two ABB Azipod units (2 × 7.5 MW); Two bow thrusters
- Speed: 12 knots (22 km/h; 14 mph) (1 engine); 15 knots (28 km/h; 17 mph) (2 engines); 2–3 knots (3.7–5.6 km/h; 2.3–3.5 mph) in 1.5 m (4.9 ft) ice
- Capacity: 90 crew and scientists
- Aviation facilities: Helideck and hangar

Xue Long 2 (simplified Chinese: 雪龙2; traditional Chinese: 雪龍2; pinyin: Xuě Lóng 2; lit. 'Snow Dragon 2') is a Chinese icebreaking research vessel that entered service in 2019. She follows the naming of Xue Long, China's first polar research vessel.

== History ==
The 5 million euro design contract for China's first domestically-built polar research vessel was signed in 2012 with the Finnish engineering company Aker Arctic, though construction did not begin until December 2016. She was built at Jiangnan Shipyard.

Xue Long 2 now in service both as a supply vessel for China's research facilities in the Arctic and Antarctic regions and as a research vessel, with capabilities for geological and biological experimentation and surveying.

On July 25, 2025, the U.S. Coast Guard spotted Xue Long 2 about 290 nautical miles north of Utqiagvik, Alaska, 130 nautical miles inside the U.S.'s extended continental shelf.

== Design ==
Xue Long 2 measures 122.5 metres (402 ft) long, with a beam of 22.3 metres (73 ft) and a draft of 8.3 metres (27 ft) at full load. She has a displacement of 14,300 tonnes. She has a diesel-electric propulsion system, with two 8-cylinder and two 12-cylinder engines, both Wärtsilä 32-series designs, powering two 7.5 MW Azipod propulsion units that give her a speed of up to 15 knots (28 km/h; 17 mph) in open water and 3 knots (5.6 km/h; 3.5 mph) when breaking 1.5-metre (4.9 ft) ice. Her ice class is Polar Class 3 and she is able to break ice while traveling either ahead or astern.
