= Sitry Airstrip =

- IATA: none; ICAO: AT23

Summary
- Airport type: Private
- Operator: ENEA-Unità Tecnica Antartitide
- Location: Antarctic Plateau
- Opened: 2000
- Closed: 2010
- Elevation AMSL: 6,735 ft (2,053 m)
- Coordinates: 71°39′19″S 148°39′09″E

Map
- Location of airfield in Antarctica

Runways
| Direction | Length | | Surface |
| Direction | ft | m | Surface |
|---|---|---|---|
| 17/35 | 3,280 | 1,000 | Ice |

Sitry Airstrip, the name is derived from the abbreviation of C-3, was an Antarctic skiway operated by the Italian ENEA-Unità Tecnica Antartitide as part of the National Antarctic Research Program (PNRA).

The airstrip is located at 2,053 metres (6,736 ft) above the sea level on the Antarctic Plateau and is 600 kilometres (370 mi) from Zucchelli Station. The skiway was used, since 2000, by the Italian personnel as fuel depot and refuelling point for the Twin Otters flying from Zucchelli Station to Concordia Station.

Sitry was visited for the last time, by the Italian researchers, in 2010; it was equipped with a shelter, which in case of emergency, could accommodate 8 people.

The skiway was abandoned because of sastrugi and the impossibility for the Twin Otters to land, however it is planned to remove any thing from the site while the refuelling point was displaced to Mid Point Airstrip.

== AWS Irene ==
The Automatic weather station, called by the code name Irene, installed on the site is out of use because of the impossibleness to do the maintenance. It makes part of a network run by the Antarctic Meteo-Climatological Observatory which collect data by 12 others operating weather stations.

== See also ==
- Zucchelli Station
- List of airports in Antarctica
- Antarctic field camps
