= Dome C =

- Antarctic base
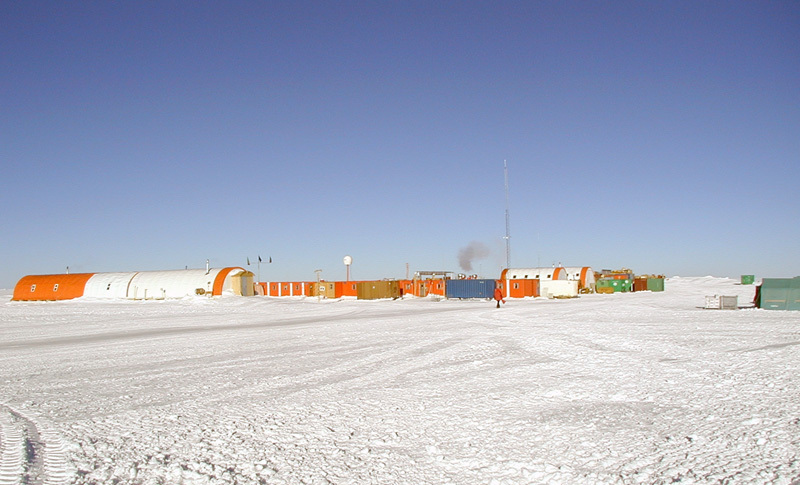
- Nicknames: dome Circe, Dome Charlie and dome Concordia
- Location of Dome C Station in Antarctica
- Coordinates: 75°05′59″S 123°19′56″E
- Location in Antarctica: Dome C Antarctic Plateau
- Administered by: National Science Foundation
- Elevation: 3,233 m (10,607 ft)

Dome C, also known as dôme Circe, Dome Charlie (US) or dôme Concordia, is located at Antarctica at an elevation of 3,233 metres (10,607 ft) above sea level, on one of several domes of the Antarctic Ice Sheet. Dome C is located on the Antarctic Plateau, 1,100 kilometres (680 mi) inland from the French research station at Dumont D'Urville, 1,100 kilometres (680 mi) inland from the Australian Casey Station and 1,200 kilometres (750 mi) inland from the Italian Zucchelli Station at Terra Nova Bay. Russia's Vostok Station is 560 kilometres (350 mi) away. Dome C is the site of the Concordia Research Station, jointly operated by France and Italy.

== History ==
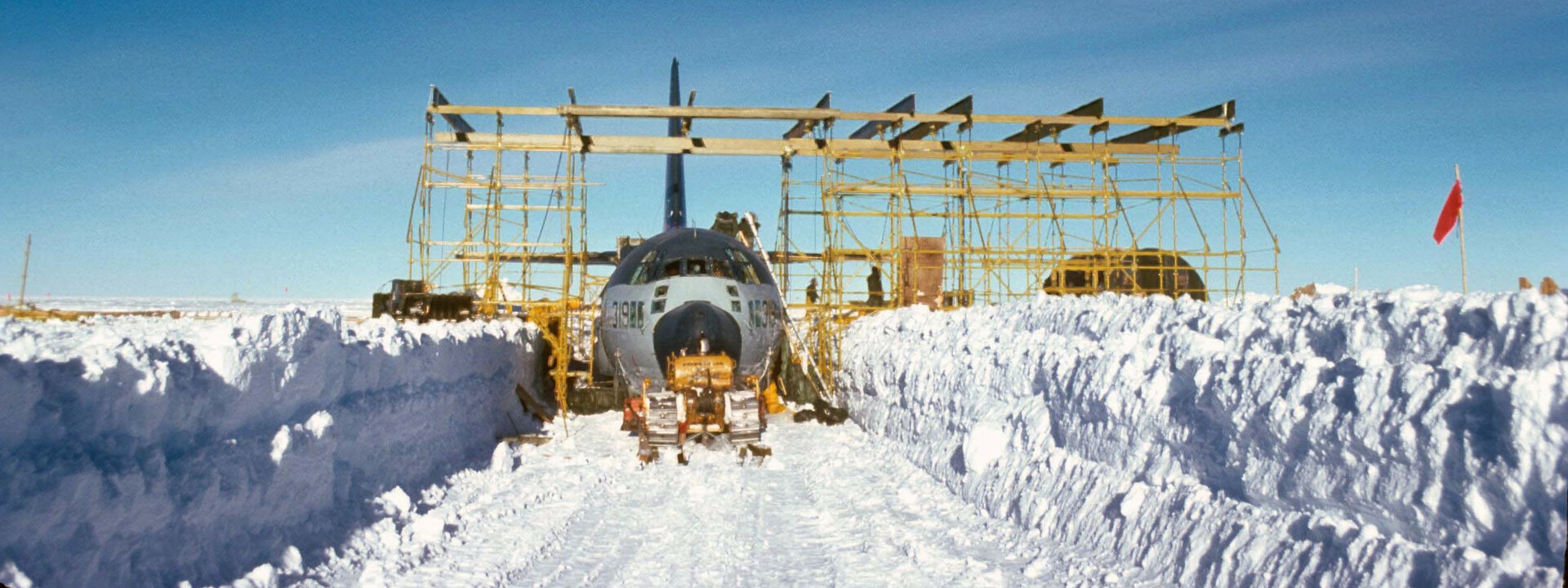
Recovery efforts on the C-130 crashed at dome C

In the 1970s, dome C was the site of ice core drilling by field teams of several nations. Designated Dome Charlie (NATO Phonetic Alphabet code for the letter C) by the U.S. Naval Support Force, Antarctica, and its Squadron VXE-6, which provided logistical support to the field teams, in January and November 1975, three LC-130 Hercules aircraft suffered severe damage during attempted takeoffs. In November 1975 and November 1976, the U.S. Navy established field camps on Dome Charlie to recover the aircraft. Following major structural repairs and replacement of engines in the field, the three LC-130s were flown to McMurdo Station on December 26, 1975, January 14, 1976, and Christmas Day 1976.

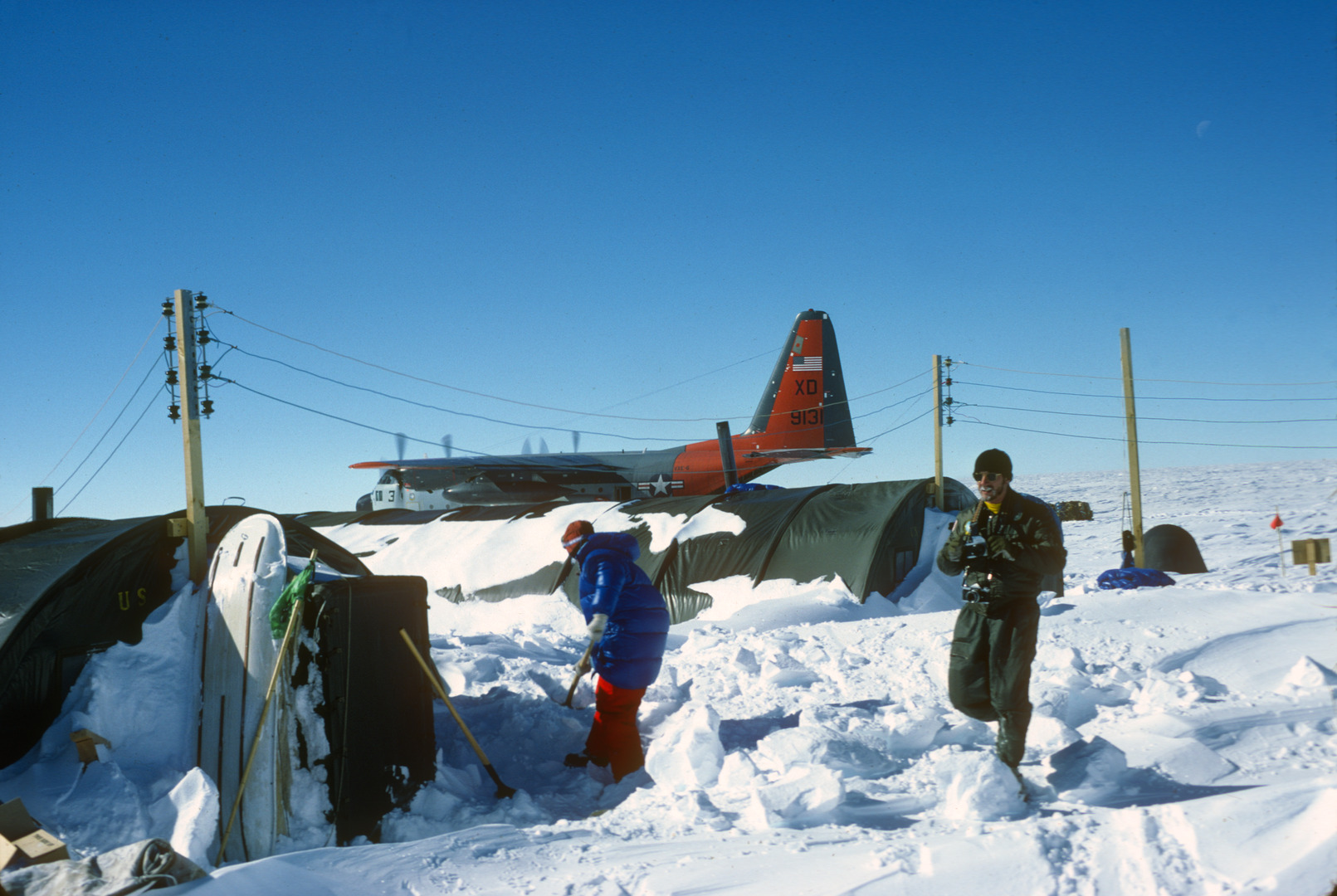
French party reopening the Dome Charlie camp before drilling

From November 1977 to March 1978 a French party of 13 settled down in the existing camp left by the aircraft rescuers. They brought several tons of equipment—thanks to the VXE-6 airplanes—and while there ice-cored down to 980 m extracting samples 45,000 to 50,000 years old.

During the Antarctic summer of 1979, the camp was re-occupied by Americans and French, under the auspices of the US Antarctic Research Program, sponsored by the National Science Foundation. Deep ice core drilling, meteorology and seismic studies were conducted. The camp, with a maximum summer population of 18, was operated and maintained by four employees of ITT Antarctic Services and one US Navy medical corpsman. When the camp was shut down for the season in about January, 1980, it was left mostly intact, with a radio-isotope powered remote weather station operational.

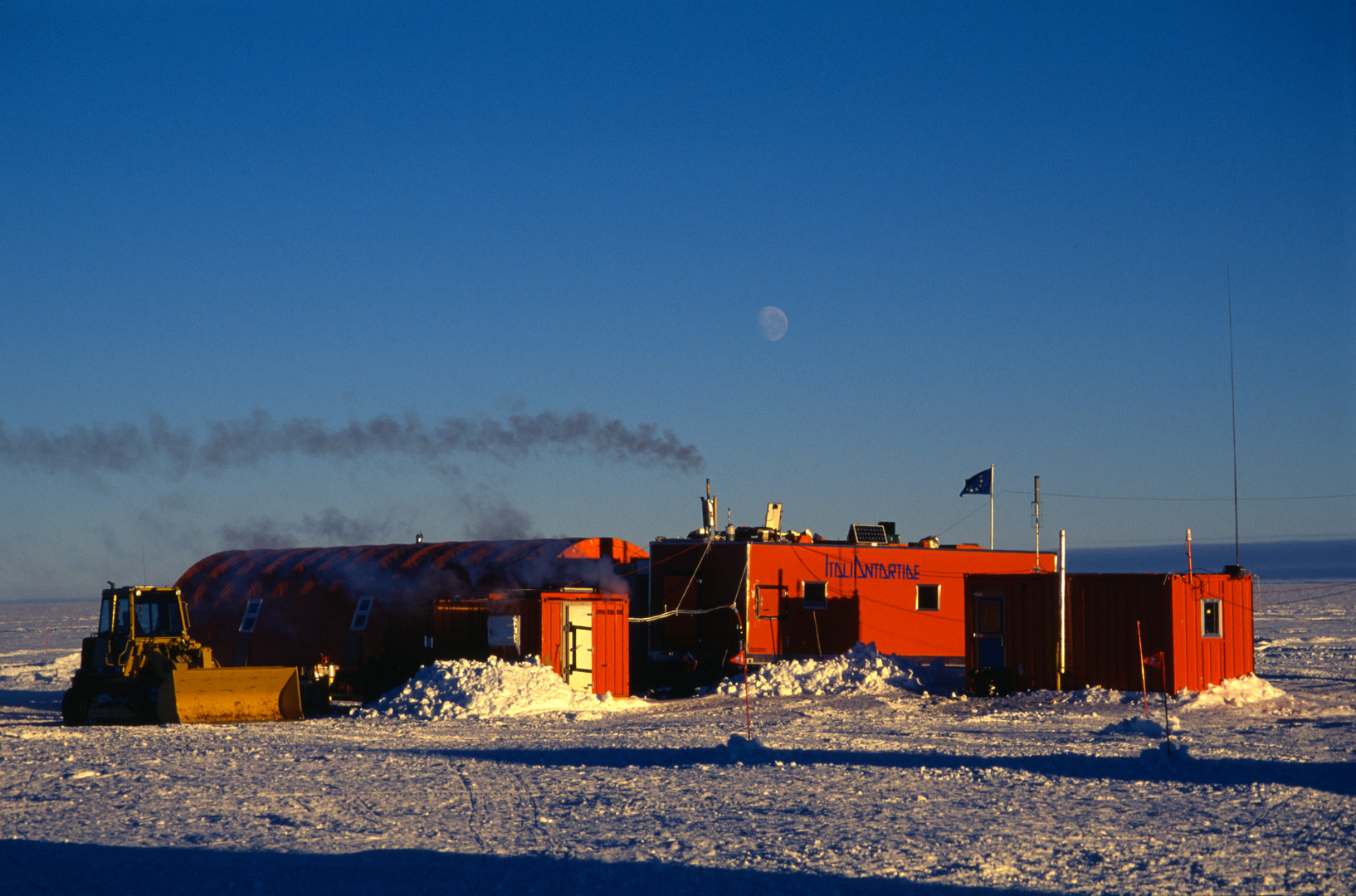
The 1996 summer camp established in a Rebusco container

In 1992, France decided to build a new station on the Antarctic Plateau. The program was later joined by Italy. In 1996, a French-Italian team established a summer camp at dome C. The two main objectives of the camp were the provision of logistical support for the European Project for Ice Coring in Antarctica (EPICA) and the construction of a permanent research station. The new all-year facility, Concordia Station, became operational in 2005.

The Advisory Committee on Antarctic Names (US-ACAN) considers "Dome Charlie" to be superior to the informal name, "dome C," and that it has precedence over "dome Circe", a name suggested from Greek mythology after Circe, the bewitching queen of Aeaea island, one of the children of solar god Helios and the Oceanid nymph Perse, who changed men into animals by magic, by members of the SPRI airborne radio echo sounding team in 1982. Later, it was named "dome Concordia" after that same French/Italian scientific base.

In February 2025, scientists confirmed the successful extraction of the oldest continuous ice core ever with distinct layers of the ice frozen between 900,000 and 1.2-million years ago.

== Climate ==
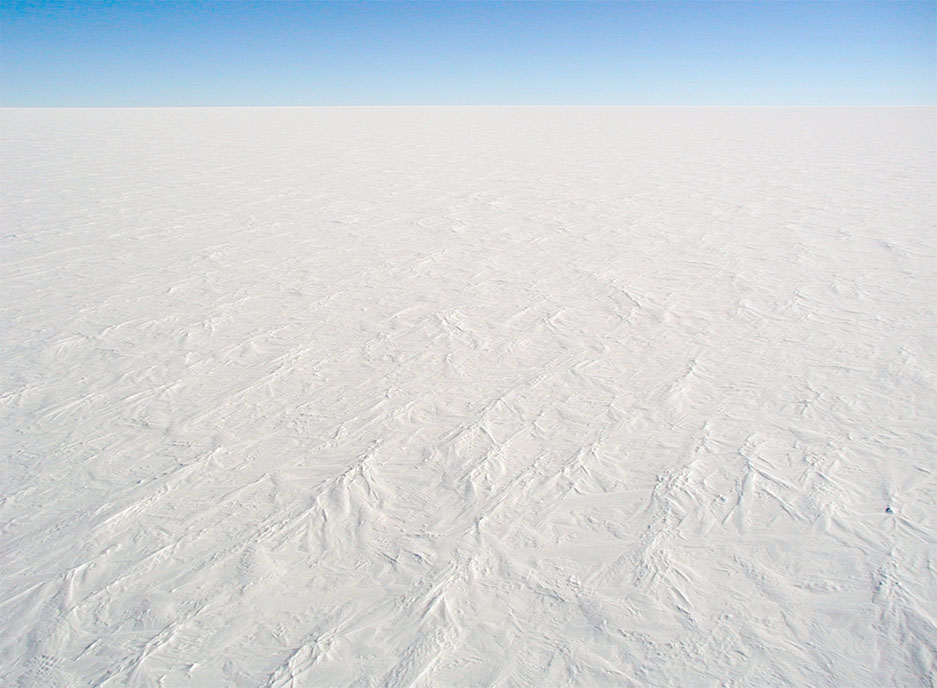
The high, flat, and cold environment of the Antarctic Plateau at dome C

Dome C is one of the coldest places on Earth. Temperatures hardly rise above −25 °C (−13 °F) in summer and can fall below −80 °C (−112 °F) in winter. The annual average air temperature is −54.5 °C (−66.1 °F). Humidity is low and it is also very dry, with very little or no precipitation throughout the year.

Dome C does not experience the katabatic winds typical of the coastal regions of Antarctica because of its elevated location and its relative distance from the edges of the Antarctic Plateau. Typical wind speed in winter is 2.8 m/s (6 mph).

Dome C is situated on top of the Antarctic Polar Plateau, the world's largest frozen desert. No animals or plants live at a distance of more than a few hundred meters from the Southern Ocean. However, south polar skuas have been spotted overflying the station, 1,200 kilometres (750 mi) away from their nearest food sources. It is believed that these seabirds have learned to cross the frozen white continent instead of circumnavigating it.

Climate data for Dome C, 3250 m asl (1981–2010 normals)
Month	Jan	Feb	Mar	Apr	May	Jun	Jul	Aug	Sep	Oct	Nov	Dec	Year
Record high °C (°F)	−5.4 (22.3)	−12.9 (8.8)	−30.8 (−23.4)	−32.9 (−27.2)	−27.0 (−16.6)	−26.0 (−14.8)	−25.4 (−13.7)	−26.5 (−15.7)	−30.3 (−22.5)	−23.1 (−9.6)	−16.9 (1.6)	−5.5 (22.1)	−5.4 (22.3)
Mean daily maximum °C (°F)	−22.2 (−8.0)	−32.7 (−26.9)	−47.1 (−52.8)	−56.8 (−70.2)	−59.9 (−75.8)	−57.1 (−70.8)	−57.6 (−71.7)	−56.8 (−70.2)	−52.9 (−63.2)	−44.3 (−47.7)	−31.5 (−24.7)	−22.5 (−8.5)	−45.1 (−49.2)
Daily mean °C (°F)	−28.9 (−20.0)	−40.1 (−40.2)	−52.6 (−62.7)	−60.7 (−77.3)	−63.4 (−82.1)	−60.8 (−77.4)	−61.6 (−78.9)	−61.1 (−78.0)	−58.5 (−73.3)	−51.7 (−61.1)	−38.6 (−37.5)	−28.5 (−19.3)	−50.5 (−59.0)
Mean daily minimum °C (°F)	−35.5 (−31.9)	−47.5 (−53.5)	−58.0 (−72.4)	−64.4 (−83.9)	−66.8 (−88.2)	−64.5 (−84.1)	−65.5 (−85.9)	−65.4 (−85.7)	−64.1 (−83.4)	−59.0 (−74.2)	−45.6 (−50.1)	−34.4 (−29.9)	−55.9 (−68.6)
Record low °C (°F)	−46.7 (−52.1)	−59.9 (−75.8)	−73.6 (−100.5)	−76.3 (−105.3)	−79.6 (−111.3)	−79.9 (−111.8)	−79.9 (−111.8)	−79.9 (−111.8)	−81.9 (−115.4)	−74.0 (−101.2)	−61.9 (−79.4)	−47.3 (−53.1)	−81.9 (−115.4)
Source 1: Météo climat stats
Source 2: Météo Climat

== Astronomical observatory ==
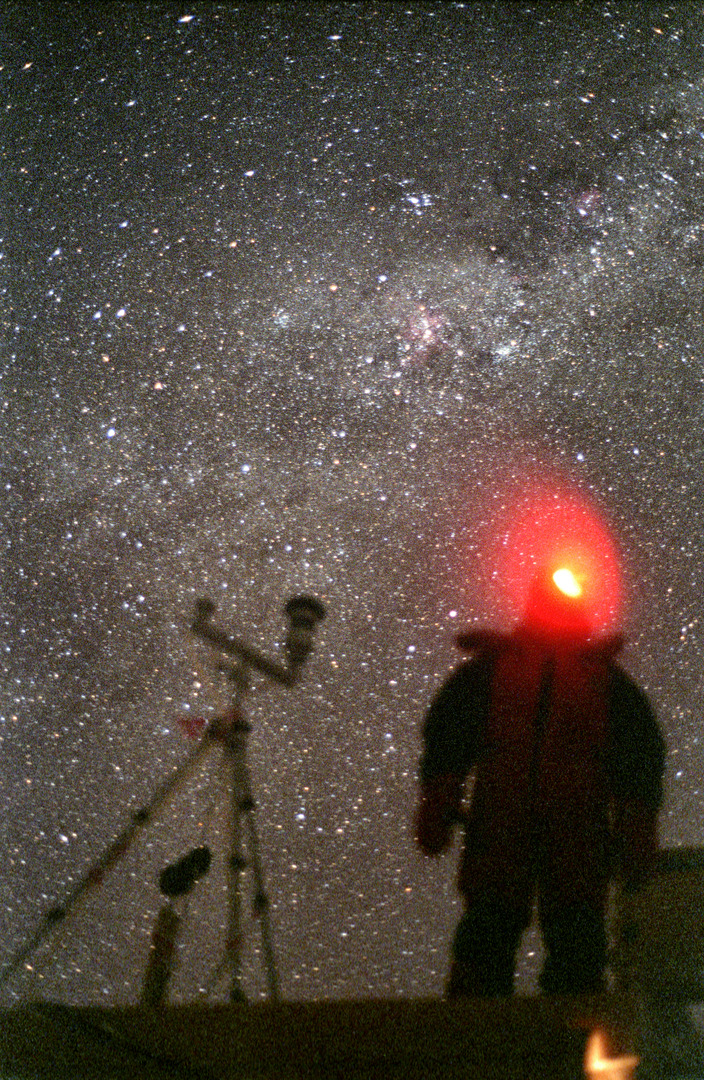
The milky Way above the glaciology shelter, dome C, winter 2005

Dome C is notable for its potential to be an extremely good astronomical observation site; the transparency of the Antarctic atmosphere allows stars to be observed, even when the Sun is at its highest possible elevation angle of 38°. The good viewing is due to very low infrared sky emission, extremely low humidity, a high percentage of cloud-free time, low atmospheric aerosol and dust content, and freedom from light pollution and background light other than auroras and moonlight. This location was a serious candidate for the ESO's E-ELT project. However, sky coverage is less than at lower latitude locations as northern celestial hemisphere objects never rise or are too low above the horizon.

The Proceedings of the Astronomical Society of the Pacific discuss the suitability of the site for astronomy in terms of the seeing. They determined the median seeing (measured with a Differential Image Motion Monitor placed on top of an 8.5-metre-high (28 ft) tower) to be 1.3±0.8 arcseconds. This is significantly worse than most major observatory sites, but similar to other observatories in Antarctica. However, they found (using balloons) that 87% of turbulence was below 36 meters. A telescope built on a tower could rise above this "boundary layer" and achieve excellent seeing. The boundary layer is 200 metres (660 ft) at the South Pole and may be as low as 20 metres (66 ft) at Dome A.

An earlier paper considered the site and concluded that "Dome C is the best ground-based site to develop a new astronomical observatory". This shows a measured superior seeing of 0.27 arcseconds, half as large as at Mauna Kea Observatory. This figure was taken with an instrument insensitive to near-ground turbulence and so it is comparable to the 0.35 arcseconds Agabi et al. measured for "free atmospheric seeing".

The 2004 experiments to measure the astronomical conditions at the site were unattended, controlled by a computer system that had to supervise the generation of its own electricity using a jet-fuel powered Stirling engine. The computer, running Linux, communicated with the outside world using an Iridium phone.

== ESA research ==
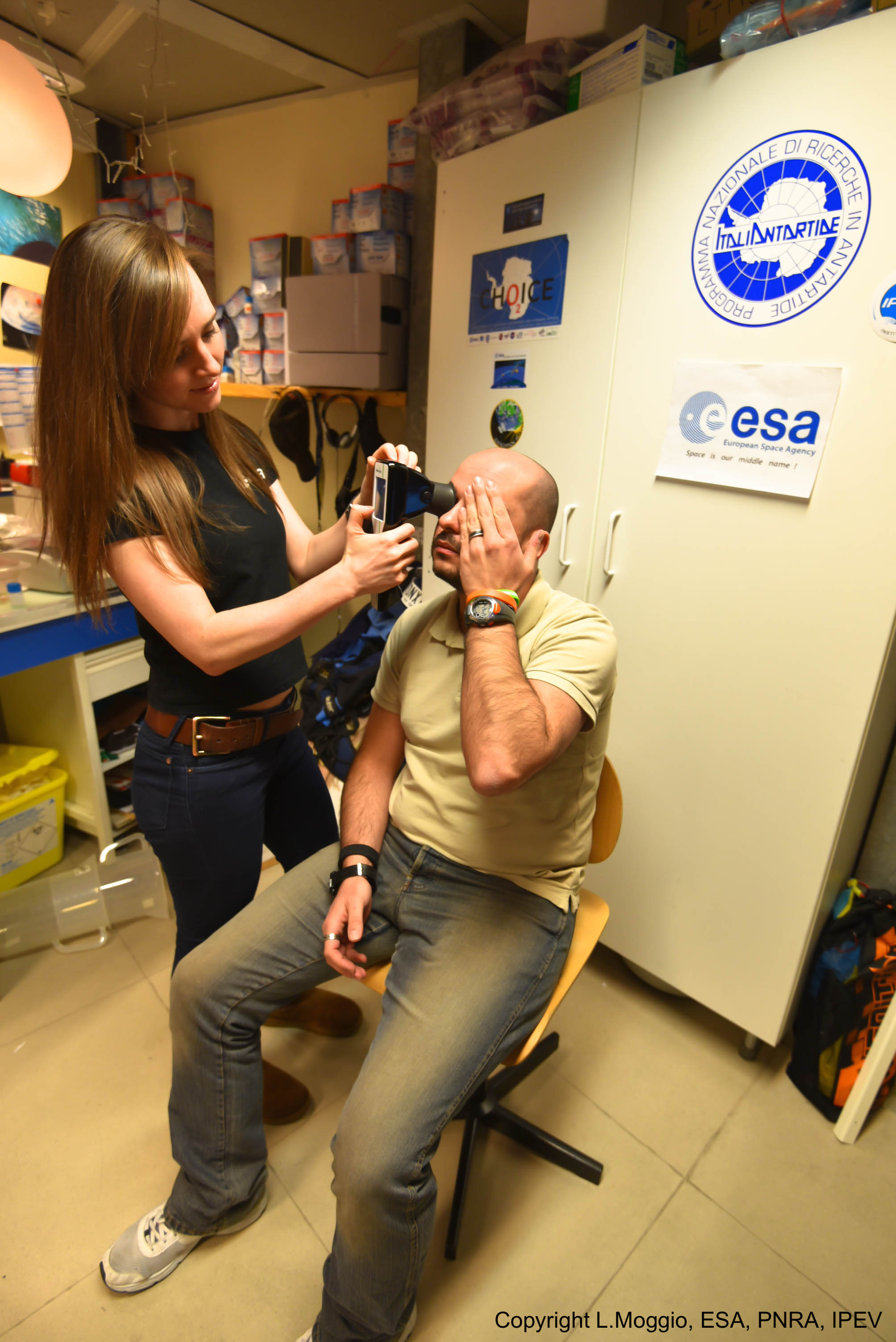
An ESA doctor performs eye test on the station, 2015

Since Concordia Station is a prime space mission analogue, the European Space Agency (ESA) conducts biomedical research there in collaboration with the French (IPEV) and Italian (ENEA/PNRA) Antarctic programs. Living conditions upon Dome C simulate what astronauts have to go through in long-duration spaceflights: isolation and confinement, different atmospheric pressure conditions, an abnormal day/night cycle. ESA sends a doctor each year to winterover at Concordia Station and facilitate biomedical experiments on the crew. These experiments are selected over a variety of tests proposed to ESA by European universities and participation from the rest of the crew is voluntary.

== See also ==
- Belgica Subglacial Highlands
- Climate of Antarctica
- Concordia Station
- dome A (or dome Argus)
- dome F (or dome Fuji)
- EPICA
- Inaccessibility Pole
- Law Dome
- Ledoyom (Ice body)
- List of mountains of Wilkes Land
- Pole of Cold
