= Mid Point Airstrip =

Antarctica airstrip

Mid Point Skiway
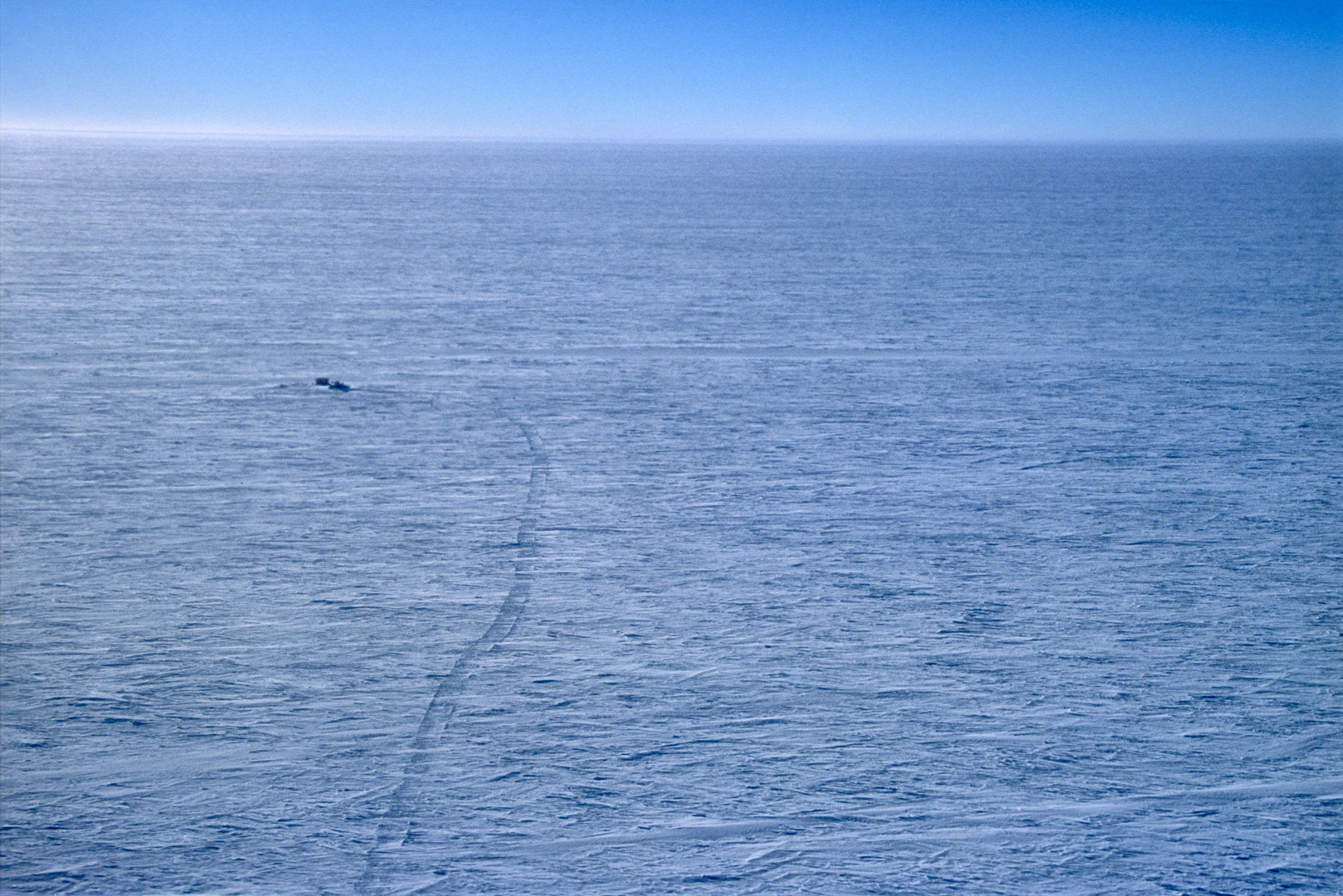
- Mid-Point Charlie seen from the air
- IATA: none; ICAO: AT14

Summary
- Airport type: Private
- Location: East Antarctic Ice Sheet
- Elevation AMSL: 8,370 ft / 2,551 m
- Coordinates: 75°32′28″S 145°49′18″E

Map
- Location of airfield in Antarctica

Runways
| Direction | Length | | Surface |
| Direction | ft | m | Surface |
|---|---|---|---|
| 01/19 | 3,960 | 1,207 | Ice |

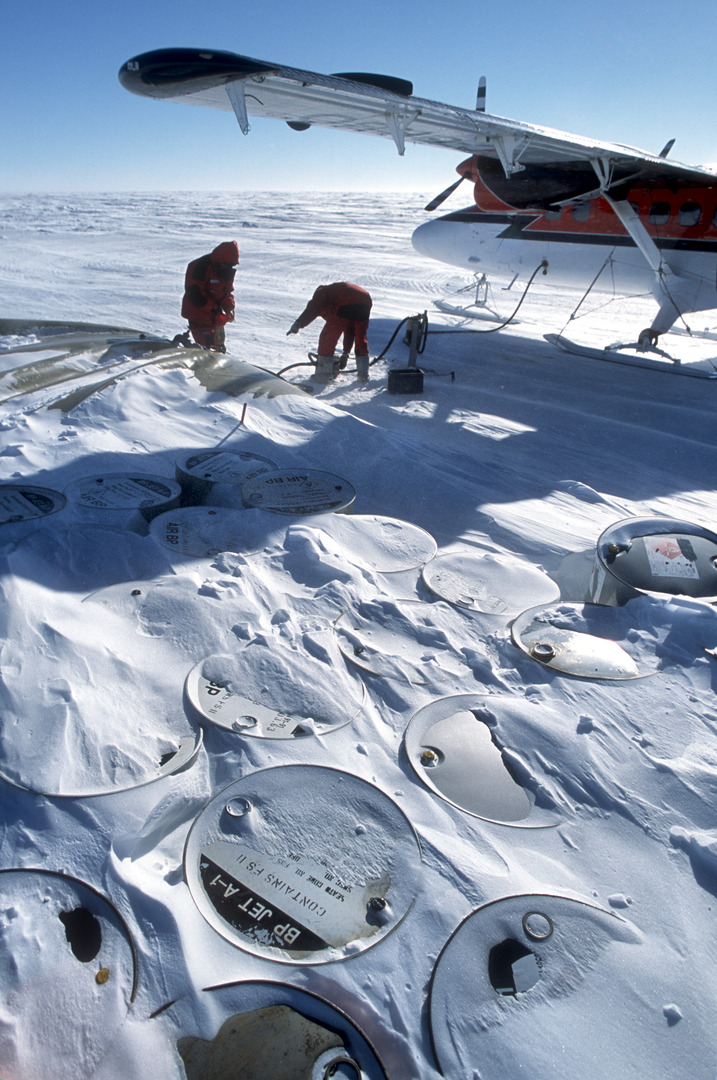
Twin Otter refueling operation at Midpoint Charlie

Mid Point is a skiway located in the East Antarctic Ice Sheet at midway between Zucchelli Station and the inland Concordia Station. Mid Point Airstrip, being at 530 kilometres (330 mi) from Zucchelli, is a refuelling place for the aircraft on their way to Concordia. The place is equipped with shelters, meteorological equipment, fuel bladders and tractors to clean the airstrip. An American researchers team lived at the camp for a time, in 2000, to carry out a project of ice drilling.

== See also ==
- Zucchelli Station
- List of airports in Antarctica
