= List of mountains of Wilkes Land =

The mountains of Wilkes Land are located in the region Wilkes Land, East Antarctica, between 100°31' E and 136°11' E. Australia claims this region to be part of the Australian Antarctic Territory. The area are highly glaciated. The availability of reliable data for this region is limited, making the list incomplete and inaccurate. The highest peaks, including nunataks and ice domes, are listed below:

Rank	Name	Elevation (meters)	Location	Coordinates	GNIS ID	SCAR ID
1	Dome C	3233	Antarctic Plateau	75°00′S 125°00′E	2668	2550
2	Mount Amundsen	1445	Knox Coast	67°14′S 100°45′E	373	324
3	Law Dome	1395	Budd Coast	66°44′S 112°50′E	8605	8209
