= List of airports in Antarctica =

This is an alphabetical list of airports in Antarctica, including airstrips, heliports and skiways (snow runways) separated according to runway material.

== List ==
=== Airports ===
==== Gravel runways ====
Runways built on ice-free ground with a compacted gravel surface. They are permanent and used by wheeled aircraft.

Airport name	Country	Coordinates	Runway direction	Runway length	ICAO code	IATA code	Other code
Boulder Clay Runway (serving Zucchelli)	Italy	74°44′24″S 164°02′14″E	02/20	7,218 feet (2,200 m)	AQBC		
Carlini Airstrip	Argentina	62°14′18″S 58°40′00″W		1,312 feet (400 m)	SAYJ		
Marambio Airport	Argentina	64°14′21″S 56°37′48″W	05/23	4,134 feet (1,260 m)	SAWB		
Rodolfo Marsh Martin Airport (serving Eduardo Frei, Bellingshausen and Artigas Base)	Chile	62°11′27″S 58°59′12″W	11/29	4,232 feet (1,290 m)	SCRM	TNM	
Rothera Air Facility	United Kingdom	67°34′04″S 68°07′39″W	18/36	2,851 feet (869 m)	EGAR		AT01

==== Ice and snow runways ====
Runways on glacial, ice-sheet or snow surfaces, including groomed and compacted snow. Most are skiways used by ski-equipped aircraft, although some are capable of handling wheeled aircraft.

Airport name	Country	Coordinates	Runway direction	Runway length	ICAO code	IATA code	Other code
Belgrano II Skiway	Argentina	64°58′32″S 60°04′17″W		6,560 feet (2,000 m)	SAYB		
Browning Pass Skiway	Italy	74°37′21″S 163°54′58″E	02/20	3,010 feet (920 m)			AT02
Byrd Surface Skiway	United States	80°01′01″S 119°35′06″W		10,940 feet (3,330 m)			
Casey Station Skiway (serving Casey)	Australia	66°17′17″S 110°45′27″E	9/27	6,547 feet (1,996 m)	YCSK		
Concordia Skiway	France; Italy	75°06′12″S 123°21′30″E	01/19	6,560 feet (2,000 m)			AT03
D10 Skiway (serving Dumont d'Urville Station)	France	66°40′05″S 139°49′11″E	10/28	4,265 feet (1,300 m)			AT04
D85 Skiway	France	70°25′30″S 134°08′45″E	9/27	9,345 feet (2,848 m)			AT05
Davis Plateau Skiway (serving Davis)	Australia	68°28′11″S 78°47′27″E	17/35	317 feet (97 m)			AT07
Dome Fuji Skiway	Japan	77°19′00″S 39°42′00″E		3,937 feet (1,200 m)			
Drúzhnaya 4 Skiway	Russia	69°44′16″S 73°44′00″E		6,562 feet (2,000 m)			
Enigma Lake Skiway (serving Mario Zucchelli)	Italy	74°43′08″S 164°01′46″E	18/36	2,376 feet (724 m)			AT09
Fossil Bluff Skiway	United Kingdom	71°19′46″S 68°16′01″W	17/35	3,960 feet (1,210 m)			AT10
Halley Skiway	United Kingdom	75°34′54″S 26°32′28″W	09/27	1,191 feet (363 m)	EGAH		AT11
Jack F. Paulus Skiway (serving Amundsen–Scott South Pole Station)	United States	89°59′51″S 139°16′22″E	02/20	12,000 feet (3,700 m)	NZSP		
Kohnen Skiway	Germany	75°00′07″S 0°04′00″E	17/35	6,560 feet (2,000 m)			AT12
Kunlun Skiway	China	80°25′02″S 77°06′58″E		10,236 feet (3,120 m)			
Mawson Plateau Skiway	Australia	67°43′09″S 62°49′26″E		Variable			
McMurdo Ice Runway (serving McMurdo Station and Scott Base)	United States; New Zealand	77°51′14″S 166°28′07″E	11/29; 16/34	9,979 feet (3,042 m); 9,979 feet (3,042 m)	NZIR		
Mid Point Skiway	Italy	75°32′28″S 145°49′18″E	01/19	3,960 feet (1,210 m)			AT14
Molodezhnaya Ice Runway	Russia	67°40′58″S 46°08′05″E	10/28	8,395 feet (2,559 m)			AT15
Neumayer III Skiway	Germany	70°38′07″S 8°15′49″W	15/33	3,326 feet (1,014 m)			AT16
O'Higgins Skiway (serving General Bernardo O'Higgins)	Chile	63°20′34″S 57°49′23″W		2,625 feet (800 m)	SCBO		
Odell Glacier Skiway	United States	76°39′00″S 159°58′00″E	18/36	5,914 feet (1,803 m)			AT18
Palmer Skiway	United States	64°46′28″S 64°02′09″W	01/19	2,500 feet (760 m)	NZ12		NZ0B; AG11180
Pegasus Field (serving McMurdo Station and Scott Base)	United States; New Zealand	77°58′28″S 166°31′40″E	15/33; 08/26 (skiway)	10,000 feet (3,000 m); 10,000 feet (3,000 m)	NZPG		
Petrel Skiway	Argentina	63°28′44″S 56°13′53″W	08/26	3,485 feet (1,062 m)			SA47
Phoenix Airfield (serving McMurdo Station and Scott Base)	United States; New Zealand	77°57′23″S 166°46′00″E	15/33	11,000 feet (3,400 m)	NZFX		
Plateau Station Skiway	United States	79°15′03″S 40°33′38″E	18/36	11,458 feet (3,492 m)			AT20
Plog Island Skiway (serving Davis)	Australia	68°32′04″S 78°00′22″E		Variable			
Progress Skiway	Russia	69°25′51″S 76°19′55″E		4,920 feet (1,500 m)			
Rumdoodle Skiway (serving Mawson)	Australia	67°45′13″S 62°45′58″E	17/35	1,320 feet (400 m)			AT21
S17 Skiway	Japan	69°01′41″S 40°05′33″E		4,000 feet (1,200 m)			
San Martín Airstrip	Argentina	68°07′00″S 67°06′00″W		1,640 feet (500 m)	SAYS		BSM
SANAE IV Skiway	South Africa	71°40′21″S 2°49′29″W	17/35	3,274 feet (998 m)			AT22
Showa Skiway	Japan	69°01′11″S 39°37′31″E	17/35	4,000 feet (1,200 m)			AT25
Siple Dome Skiway	United States	81°39′29″S 148°59′51″E		10,940 feet (3,330 m)			
Sitry Skiway	Italy	71°39′14″S 148°39′12″E	17/35	3,274 feet (998 m)			AT23
Taishan Skiway	China	73°51′50″S 76°58′27″E		6,955 feet (2,120 m)			
Thiel Skiway		85°11′54″S 87°52′42″W	17/35	5,175 feet (1,577 m)			AT26
Vostok Skiway	Russia	78°27′58″S 106°50′54″E	03/21	11,983 feet (3,652 m)			AT28
Wilkins Runway (serving Casey)	Australia	66°41′22″S 111°29′09″E	09/27	13,123 feet (4,000 m)	YWKS		
Williams Field (serving McMurdo Station and Scott Base)	United States; New Zealand	77°52′02″S 167°03′24″E	07/25; 15/33	10,000 feet (3,000 m); 10,000 feet (3,000 m)	NZWD		
Zucchelli Ice Runway (serving Zucchelli)	Italy	74°40′59″S 164°06′45″E	03/21	10,137 feet (3,090 m)	NZTB		AT13

==== Blue ice runways ====
Runways on blue-ice areas where wind and sublimation have stripped away the snow cover. The surface is hard enough to support wheeled aircraft, including heavy transports.

Airport name	Country	Coordinates	Runway direction	Runway length	ICAO code	IATA code	Other code
Novo Runway (serving Novolazarevskaya and Maitri); Also called Ultima Airbase""	Russia; India	70°49′17″S 11°38′36″E	10/28	10,824 feet (3,299 m)			AT17
Patriot Hills Blue-Ice Runway	United States	80°18′53″S 81°22′29″W	24M	3,281 feet (1,000 m)	SCPZ		
Perseus Airstrip (serving Princess Elisabeth Antarctica)	Belgium	71°25′42″S 23°33′57″E	10/28	9,840 feet (3,000 m)			
Princess Elisabeth Skiway	Belgium	71°57′27″S 23°13′12″E		4,650 feet (1,420 m)			AT99
Sky Blu Skiway	United Kingdom	74°51′23″S 71°34′10″W	14/32	3,960 feet (1,210 m)	EGAT		AT24
Troll Airfield (serving Troll Station)	Norway	71°57′19″S 2°28′03″E	11/29	10,826 feet (3,300 m)	ENOE		AT27
Union Glacier Blue-Ice Runway (serving Union Glacier Camp and Union Glacier Station)	United States; Chile	79°46′40″S 83°19′15″W	18/36	9,842 feet (3,000 m)	SCGC	UGL	
Wolfs Fang Runway	United Kingdom	71°31′S 08°48′E		2,500 metres (8,200 ft)			AT98

==== Sea ice runways ====
Runways on frozen seawater. They are seasonal and usable only while the ice is thick enough to bear aircraft.

Airport name	Country	Coordinates	Runway direction	Runway length	ICAO code	IATA code	Other code
Davis Sea Ice Skiway (serving Davis)	Australia	68°33′53″S 77°57′54″E		317 feet (97 m)			
Matienzo Skiway	Argentina	64°58′32″S 60°04′17″W		4,920 feet (1,500 m)	SAWZ		BTM
Mawson Sea Ice Skiway	Australia	67°36′03″S 62°49′58″E		Variable			

=== Heliports ===
Heliport name	Country	ICAO code	IATA code	Other code	Location	Coordinates	Surface
Arctowski Heliport	Poland			AG11177	King George Island	62°09′34″S 58°28′23″W	Concrete
Bharati Heliport	India				Larsemann Hills	69°24′24″S 76°11′36″E	Concrete
Ferraz Heliport	Brazil			AG11178	King George Island	62°05′09″S 58°23′29″W	
Machu Picchu Heliport	Peru			AG11179	King George Island	62°05′28″S 58°28′16″W	Concrete
Maitri Helipad	India				Schirmacher Oasis	70°46′00″S 11°43′55″E	Concrete
Marble Point Heliport; Refuelling station	United States			GC0079	Victoria Land	77°24′47″S 163°40′44″E	Gravel
Orcadas Heliport	Argentina	SAYO			Laurie Island	60°44′17″S 44°44′16″W	
Primavera Heliport	Argentina				Cierva Cove	64°09′24″S 60°57′12″W	Concrete
St. Kliment Ohridski Heliport	Bulgaria				Livingston Island	62°38′27″S 60°21′53″W	Concrete
Artigas Heliport	Uruguay				King George Island	62°11′05″S 58°54′12″W	Gravel
Zhongshan Station	China				Larsemann Hills	69°25′47″S 76°20′31″E	Ice

== See also ==
- Lists of airports
- Research stations in Antarctica
- Transport in Antarctica
