= Zucchelli Station =

- Antarctic base
- Mario Zucchelli Station
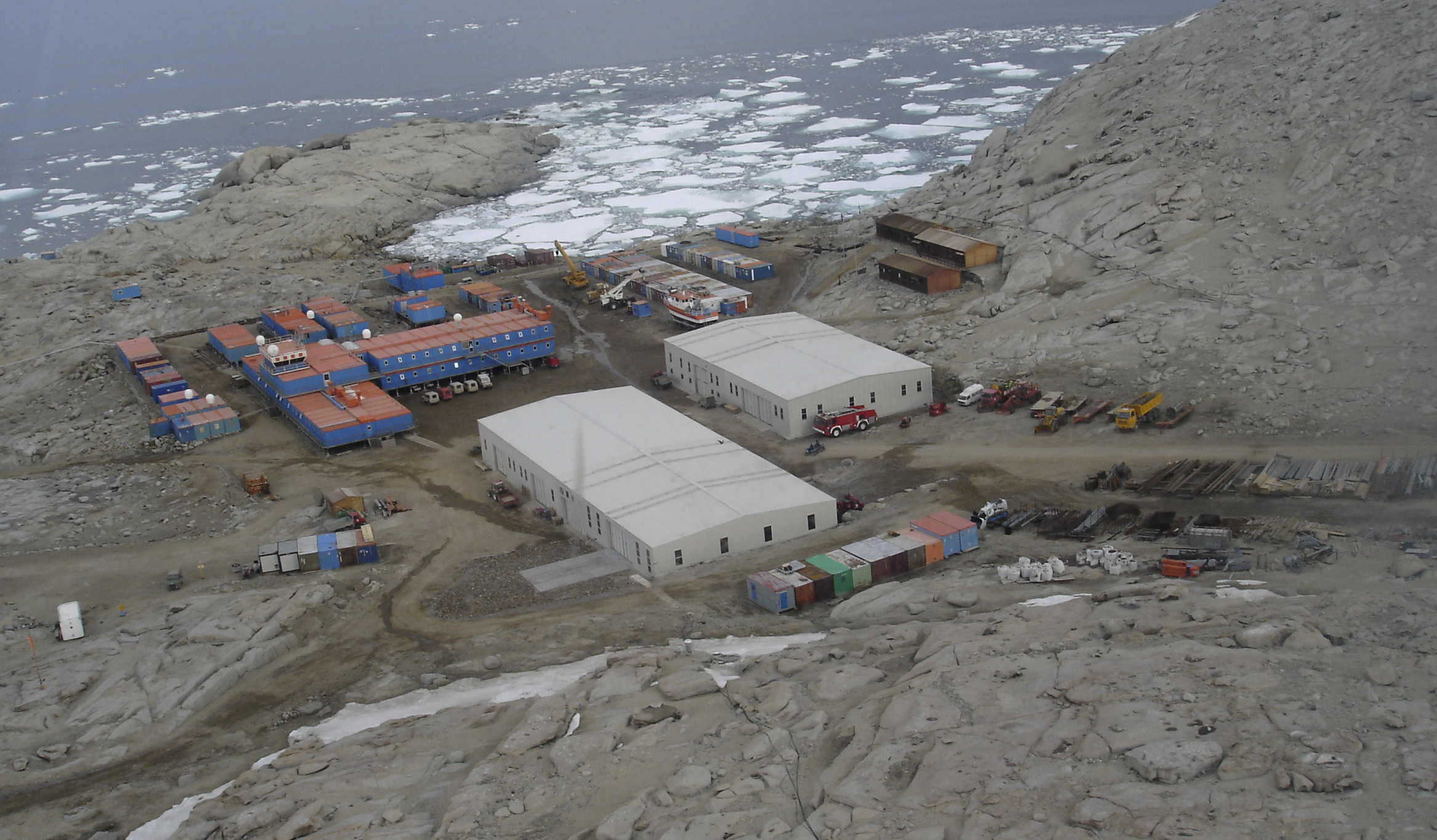
- Zucchelli Station at Terra Nova Bay

- Location of Zucchelli Station in Antarctica
- Coordinates: 74°41′39″S 164°06′50″E
- Country: Italy
- Location in Antarctica: Terra Nova Bay; Ross Sea
- Administered by: National Antarctic Research Program
- Established: 1985
- Named for: Mario Zucchelli
- Elevation: 15 m (49 ft)

Population (2017)
  - Summer: 120
  - Winter: 0
- Time zone: UTC+12:00 (NZST)
  - Summer (DST): UTC+13:00 (NZDT)
- UN/LOCODE: AQ MZU
- Type: Seasonal
- Period: Summer
- Status: Operational
- Activities: List: Astrophysics; Climatology; Fishery; Geodesy; Geology; Geomorphology; Glaciology; Limnology; Marine biology; Microbiology; Oceanography; Soil science
- Website: www.pnra.aq/it

Zucchelli Station is an Italian seasonal research station in Antarctica, which is located at Terra Nova Bay on a granitic headland along the coast of the Northern Foothills to the north-east of Gerlache Inlet. It has been named after Mario Zucchelli, director of the activities, which conducted for sixteen years, for the ENEA-Unità Tecnica Antartide as part of the National Antarctic Research Program (PNRA).

The main functions carried out by the Station are:

- logistic support to scientific personnel operating in remote fields
- logistical and operational support to the oceanographic ship
- support to research activities with laboratories and instrumentation
- support to personnel and material in transit for Concordia Station
- support to air operations

== Description ==
The Zucchelli Station is a seasonal (from mid-October until mid-March) research Antarctic Station on the Terra Nova Bay in New Zealands Ross Dependancy located at an altitude of 15 metres (49 ft) and covers an area of approximately 7,500 square meters. In 2010, the Station was enlarged and in the austral summer the traverse leave for Concordia Station operated jointly with France.

=== Main building ===
The main building was built in 1985, in the first seasonal expedition, on a steel structure 1.5 metres (4 ft 11 in) from the ground and consist of 82 containers, 42 of which used for the personnel accommodation and services while the remaining 40 to the support activities as:

- operations room situated on the top of the building, like a control tower, looking over the base
- communications room, adjacent to the operation room to facilitate the HF radio and the satellite radio transmissions
- calculation room which give informatics support and data transmission,
- offices,
- laboratories (chemistry, biology, geology, electronics),
- cafeteria,
- kitchen,
- emergency,
- infirmary,
- laundry.

=== Technical plants ===
- aquarium
- boat storage
- carpentry
- co-generation system for the exploitation of the thermal energy produced by the power plant
- deposit for vehicles
- desalination plant
- diving chamber
- electrical and mechanical workshop
- fuel storage
- helipads
- incinerator plant
- materials warehouse
- nitrogen and helium liquefiers
- power and thermal energy plant (four diesel generators)
- shredder and compactor plant
- wastewater treatment plant

=== Research activity ===
- cosmic ray observations
- geodesy
- geomagnetic observations
- glaciology
- ionospheric/auroral observations
- meteorological observations
- oceanography
- offshore marine biology
- onshore geology
- seismology and environmental monitoring
- terrestrial biology

== Icaro Camp ==
Icaro Camp (74°42′43″S 164°07′00″E) is a facility, fitted as a meteorological station, located 2 kilometres (1.2 mi) south of the Zucchelli Station. The camp consists of two blue containers, held by guy-wires, meteorological equipment, solar panels and a wind generator. Although the structures are not suited to accommodate people, they could shelter a dozen in case of emergency.

== Transportation ==
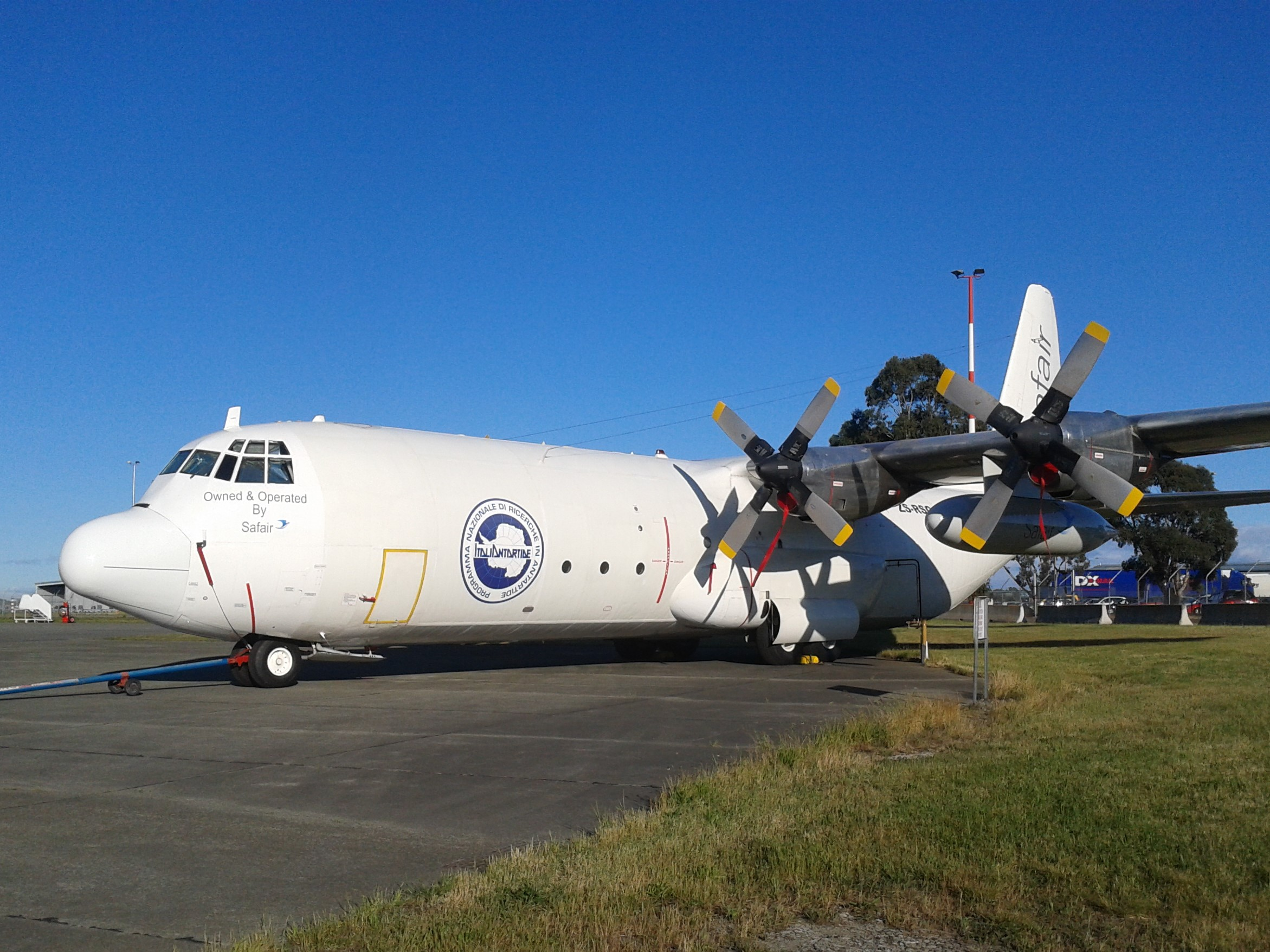
Safair L100-30 leased by PNRA at Christchurch Airport in-between missions to Zucchelli Station

Boulder Clay Runway (Under construction)
- IATA: none; ICAO: AQBC

Summary
- Airport type: Private
- Location: Zucchelli Station; Terra Nova Bay
- Elevation AMSL: 672 ft (205 m)
- Coordinates: 74°44′22″S 164°02′07″E
- Interactive map of Boulder Clay Runway (Under construction)

Runways
Direction	Length		Surface
Direction	ft	m	Surface
02/20	7,218	2,200	Gravel

Enigma Lake Skiway
- IATA: none; ICAO: AT09

Summary
- Airport type: Private
- Location: Zucchelli Station; Terra Nova Bay
- Elevation AMSL: 443 ft (135 m)
- Coordinates: 74°43′08″S 164°01′46″E
- Interactive map of Enigma Lake Skiway

Runways
Direction	Length		Surface
Direction	ft	m	Surface
18/36	2,376	724	Ice

Zucchelli Ice Runway
- IATA: QAZ; ICAO: AT13

Summary
- Airport type: Private
- Location: Gerlache Inlet; Terra Nova Bay
- Coordinates: 74°41′39″S 164°06′50″E
- Interactive map of Zucchelli Ice Runway

Runways
Direction	Length		Surface
Direction	ft	m	Surface
03/21	10,137	3,090	Ice
06/24	5,385	1,641	Ice

=== Boulder Clay Runway ===
Boulder Clay Runway (74°44′22″S 164°02′07″E) is located about 6 kilometres (3.7 mi) south of Zucchelli Station on the Northern Foothills; the construction started in the 2016–17 season and will be completed in the 2021–22. The Italian team usually use an Ice Runway in the Gerlache Inlet to start the summer campaign but in recent years the ice runway was closed earlier then before because of the ice thickness had diminished due to partial melting of the ice. The airstrip is situated on the Boulder Clay Moraine and is built with the least environmental impact as possible. It is a gravel runway 2,200 metres (7,200 ft) long and 60 metres (200 ft) wide in order to be suitable to the Safair or Aeronautica Militare C-130J or other larger types, such as the C-17 Globemaster, Airbus A319-115LR and Boeing 757. The airfield will be completed with a taxiway which connect the apron with the runway, an apron for aircraft parking and operational tasks, capable of stationing two C-130 Hercules, fire service as ICAO standards, fuel deposit, terminal and shed for the personnel, operation room and a power unit. The reduced thickness of the ice in the Ross Sea did not allowed to the heavier C-130J Hercules of the Italian Air Force to land on the sea ice runway. On 22 November 2022 at 4.30 CET a C-130J landed for the first time on the prepared gravel runway. Boulder Clay Runway will become an international hub as it can be utilised by the other nearby research stations.

=== Enigma Lake Skiway ===
Enigma Lake Skiway is situated at an elevation of 135 metres (443 ft), on the Northern Foothills, 3 kilometres (1.9 mi) south of Zucchelli Station on an iced lake. Being 725 metres (2,379 ft) long it is operated by the Twin Otters and Basler BT-67. The skyway is prepared by removing the snow accumulated in the winter by the Station staff; in the same place stands an AWS (Rita) which makes part of the network managed by the Antarctic Meteo-Climatological Weather Observatory.

=== Zucchelli Ice Runway ===
Zucchelli Ice Runway is located in the Gerlache Inlet and is prepared, at the beginning of each season, by the station's logistic personnel in mid-October. The sea ice runway is suitable for operating the Aeronautica Militare or Safair wheeled C-130, but in the latest years it was closed earlier than before because the sea ice break up. Two runways are prepared, one is the 03/21 which is 3,090 metres (10,140 ft) long and 76 metres (249 ft) wide used by the C-130, the other is the 06/24 which is shorter measuring 1,640 metres (5,380 ft) in length and 50 metres (160 ft) in width utilised by the Twin Otters and the Basler BT-67.

== Climate ==
=== AWS Network ===
The Antarctic Meteo-Climatological Weather Observatory, established in 1985, attempt to a give a contribution to understand the climate change through the study of the atmospheric dynamics. The programme is defined by two projects supported by the National Antarctic Research Program (PNRA), one regarding the Victoria Land and the other the Concordia Station, carried out by the ENEA personnel. The centre run an Automatic weather station network, distributed through the territory, having the responsibility of the instrumentation assembly, the maintenance and the data collection. The network include 16 AW stations operating all year around:

- Alessandra (Cape King), 71°35′09″S 166°00′40″E
- Arelis (Cape Ross), 76°42′54″S 162°58′12″E
- Concordia Station,
- Eneide (Terra Nova Bay) 74°42′00″S 164°07′00″E
- Giulia (Mid Point), 75°32′28″S 145°49′18″E
- Irene (Sitry),
- Jennica (Terra Nova Bay),
- Lola (Tourmaline Plateau),
- Maria (Browning Pass),
- Modesta (Priestley Glacier),
- Paola (Talos Dome),
- Rita (Enigma Lake),
- Silvia (Cape Phillips),
- Sofia (Nansen Ice Sheet),
- Sofiab (David Glacier),
- Zoraida (Priestley Glacier).

Climate data for Zucchelli Station
Month	Jan	Feb	Mar	Apr	May	Jun	Jul	Aug	Sep	Oct	Nov	Dec	Year
Mean daily maximum °C (°F)	1 (34)	−5 (23)	−12 (10)	−16 (3)	−17 (1)	−17 (1)	−20 (−4)	−17 (1)	−16 (3)	−13 (9)	−5 (23)	1 (34)	−11 (12)
Mean daily minimum °C (°F)	−2 (28)	−8 (18)	−16 (3)	−21 (−6)	−22 (−8)	−23 (−9)	−25 (−13)	−23 (−9)	−22 (−8)	−18 (0)	−9 (16)	−3 (27)	−16 (3)
Average precipitation mm (inches)	42.1 (1.66)	23.5 (0.93)	0.7 (0.03)	0.8 (0.03)	3.8 (0.15)	8.4 (0.33)	13 (0.5)	4.7 (0.19)	1.6 (0.06)	3 (0.1)	17.4 (0.69)	25.7 (1.01)	144.7 (5.70)

== See also ==
- List of Antarctic research stations
- List of Antarctic field camps
- Airports in Antarctica
- Concordia Station operated by France and Italy
- Jang Bogo Station a South Korean station in Terra Nova Bay

== Gallery ==
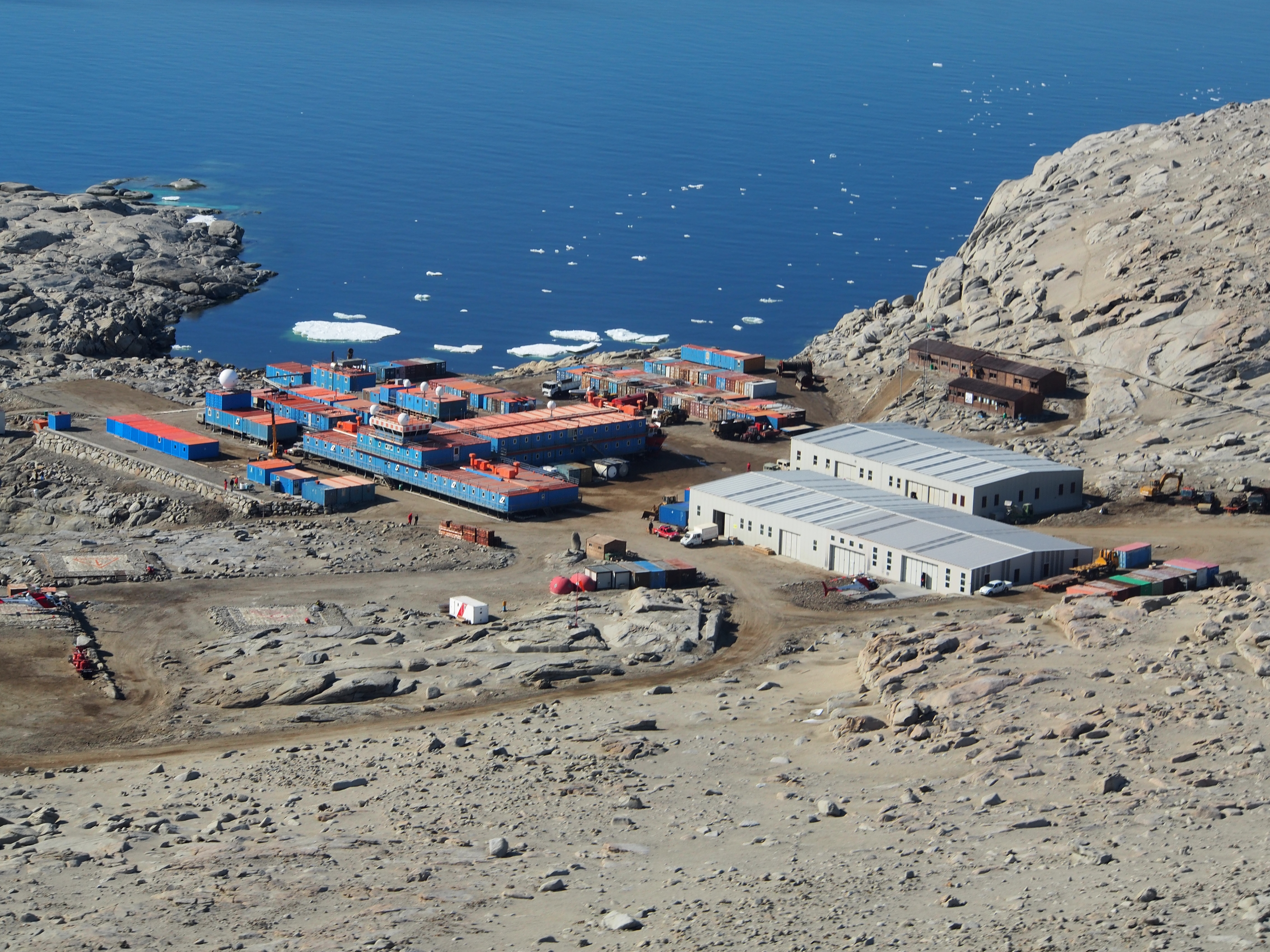

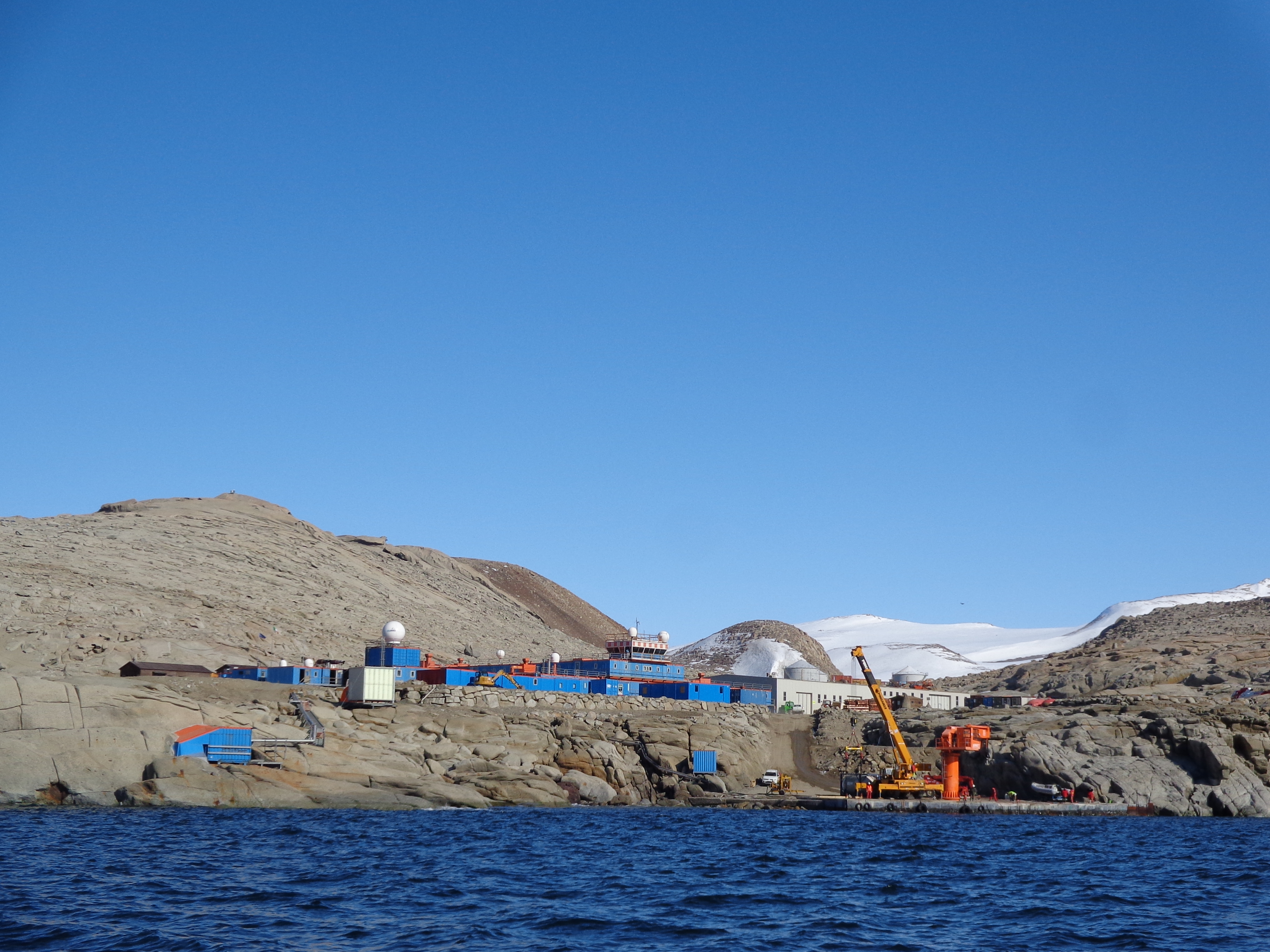

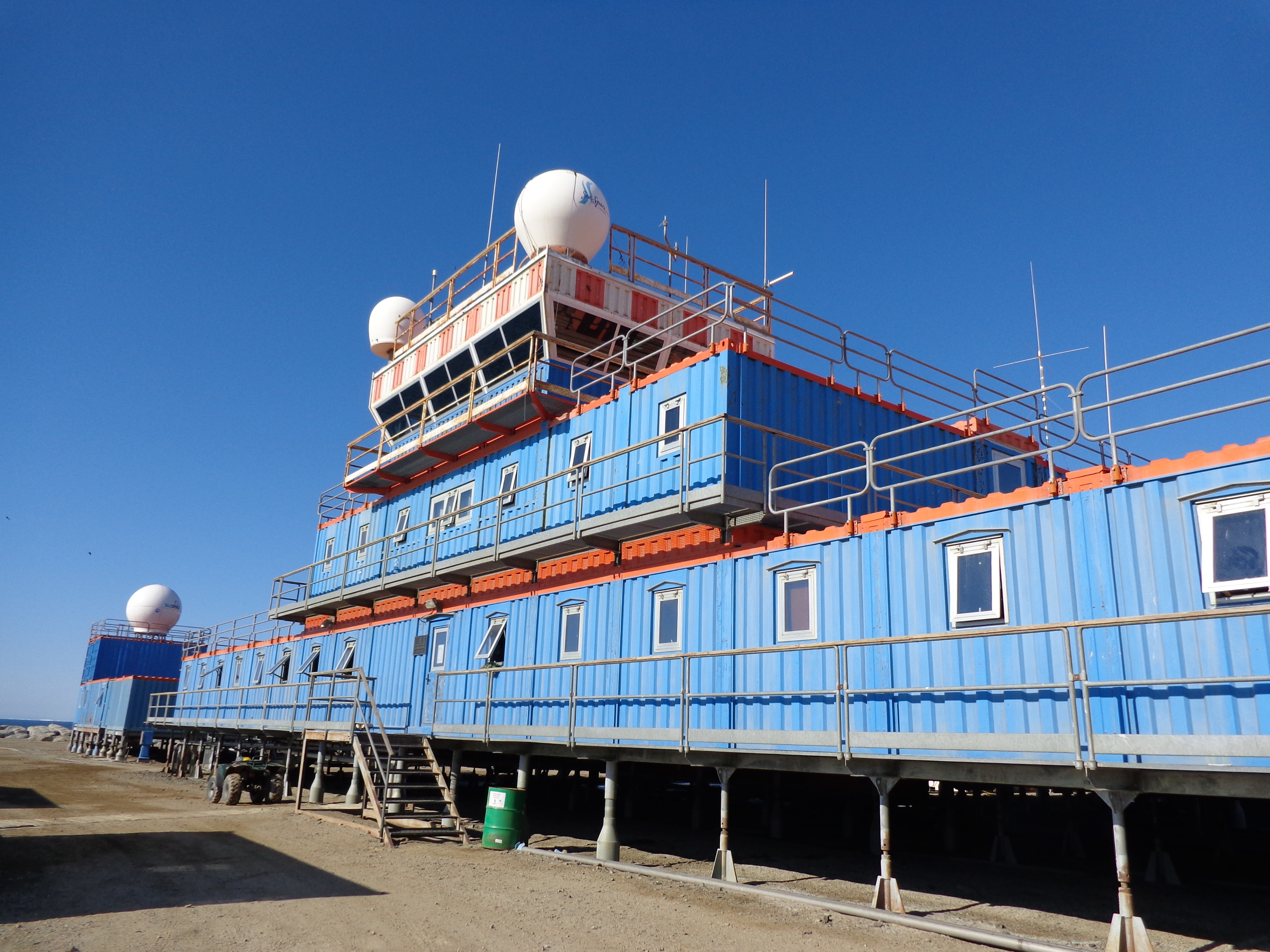

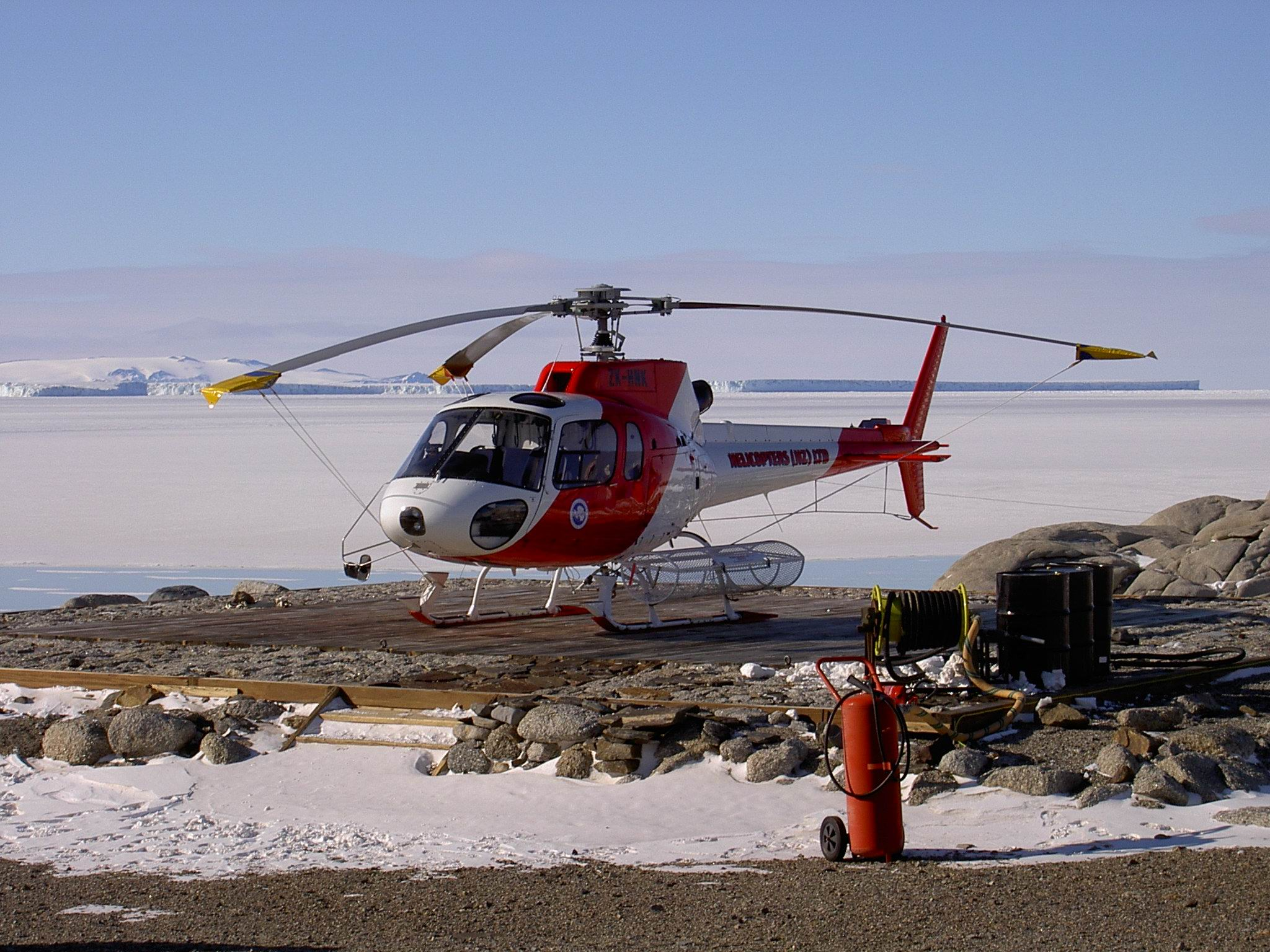

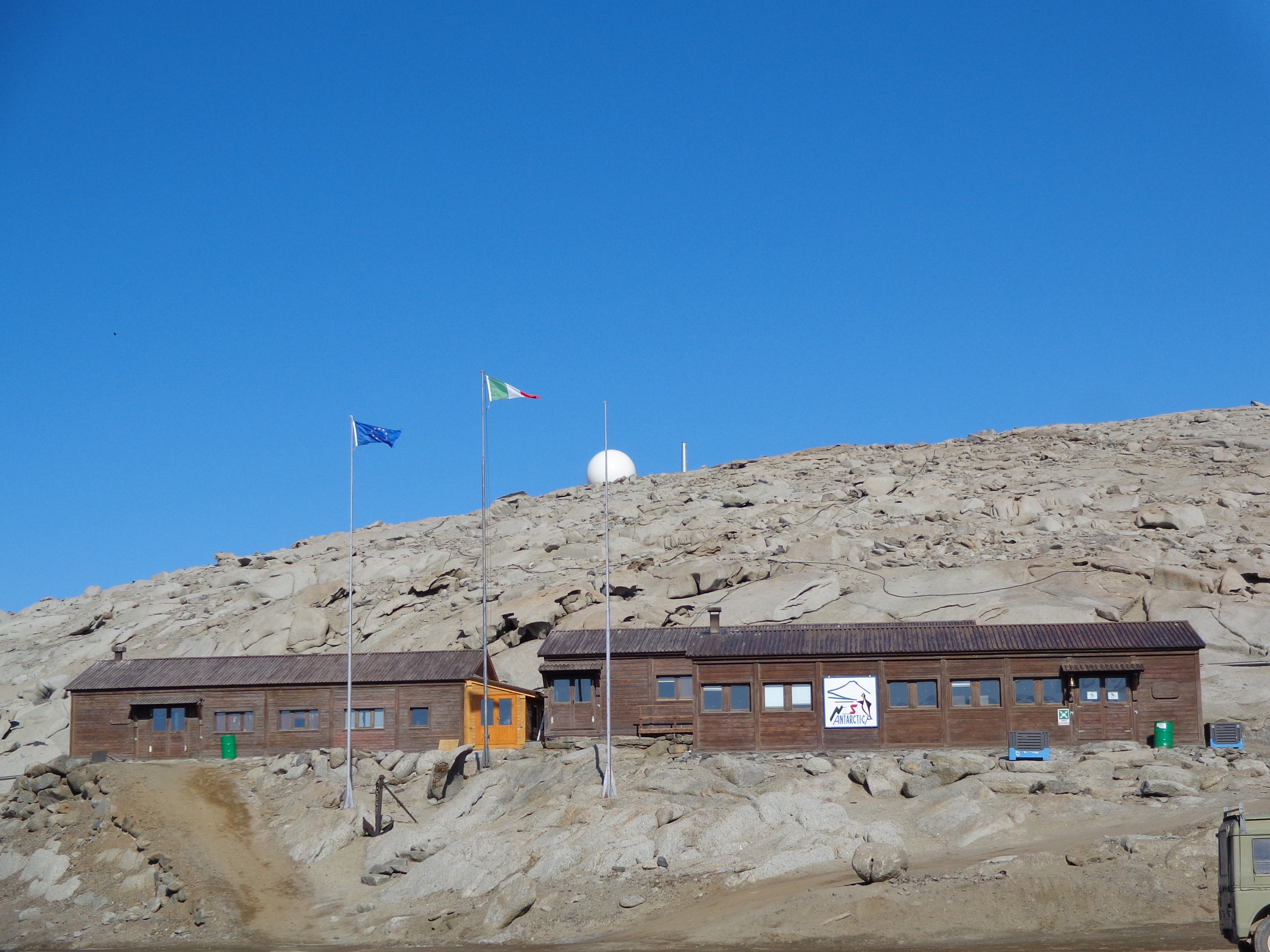

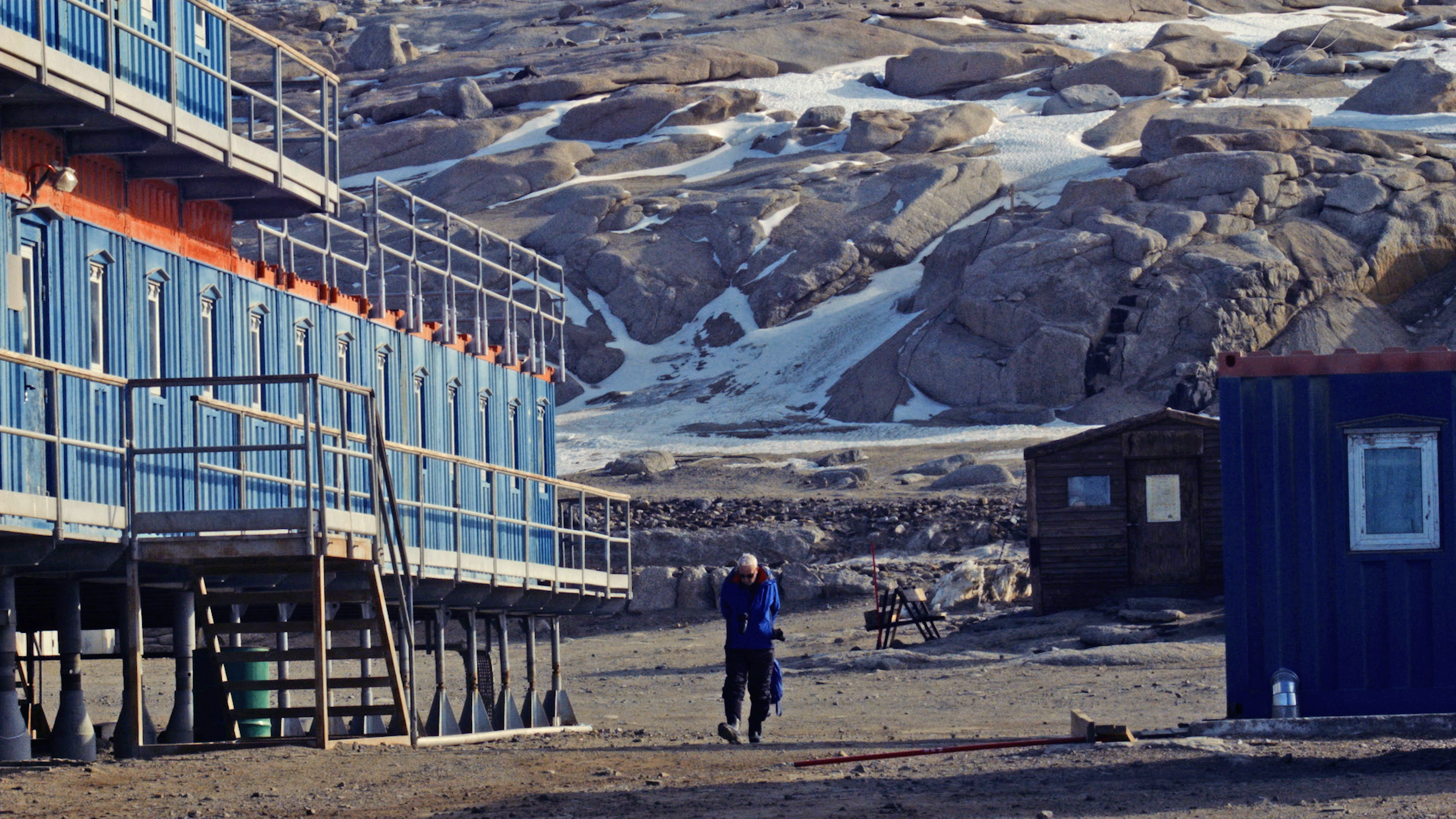
