= Rothera Air Facility =

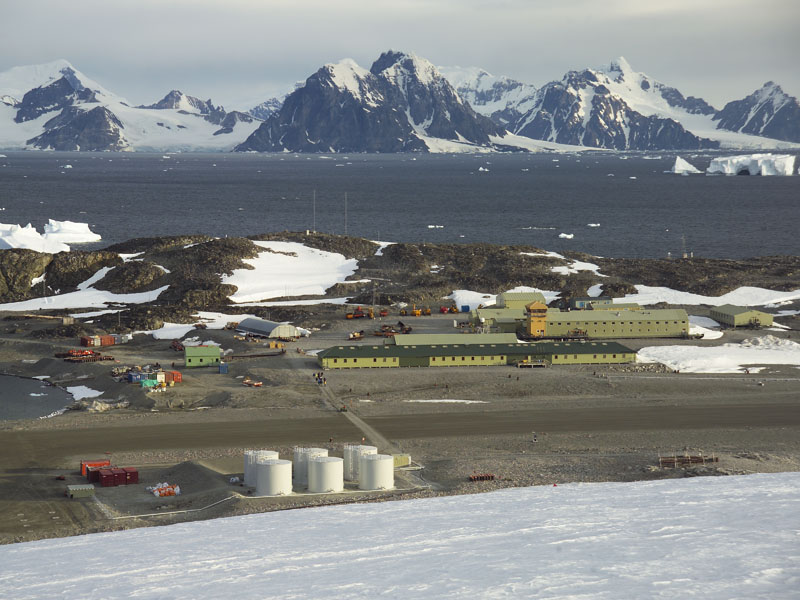
- IATA: none; ICAO: EGAR

Summary
- Airport type: Private
- Owner: British Antarctic Survey
- Serves: Rothera Research Station
- Location: Antarctic Peninsula
- Elevation AMSL: 13 ft / 4 m
- Coordinates: 67°34′04″S 68°07′40″W

Map
- Location of Rothera Air Facility in Antarctica

Runways
Direction	Length		Surface
Direction	m	ft	Surface
18/36	900	2,953	Crushed rock
- GCM Google Maps

Rothera Air Facility (ICAO: EGAR) is an airfield serving Rothera Research Station, the British Antarctic Survey logistics centre for the Antarctic and home of well-equipped biological laboratories and facilities for a wide range of research. The station is situated on a rock and raised beach promontory at the southern extremity of Wormald Ice Piedmont, south-eastern Adelaide Island.

The station has a 900 metres (3,000 ft) crushed rock runway, with an associated hangar and bulk fuel storage facility, and a wharf for the discharge of cargo from supply ships. There is a transitory summer population of scientists and support staff who reach Rothera either by ship or through use of a De Havilland Canada Dash 7 aircraft flying from the Falkland Islands.

From its inception until the 1991/1992 summer season BAS Twin Otter aircraft used the skiway 1,000 feet (300 m) above the station on Wormald Ice Piedmont. With the commissioning of the gravel runway and hangar in 1991/1992 air operations became more reliable and access to Rothera was greatly improved through a direct airlink from the Falkland Islands. The Twin Otters mainly fly south of Rothera, via a network of fuel depots, most of which are staffed. Heading south of Rothera, the first stop would be Fossil Bluff, then Sky Blu.

The Dash 7 will make approximately 20 flights a season to Stanley during the summer, bringing in scientists, support staff, food and equipment. When not tasked for these flights, the Dash can fly to Sky Blu in one hop, landing on the Blue Ice runway, significantly enhancing the range of the Twin Otters by depositing fuel and equipment in much larger quantities.

== See also ==
- Transport in Antarctica
- List of airports in Antarctica
