= Vostok Station =

Russian research station in Antarctica

Vostok Station станция Восток
- Antarctic base
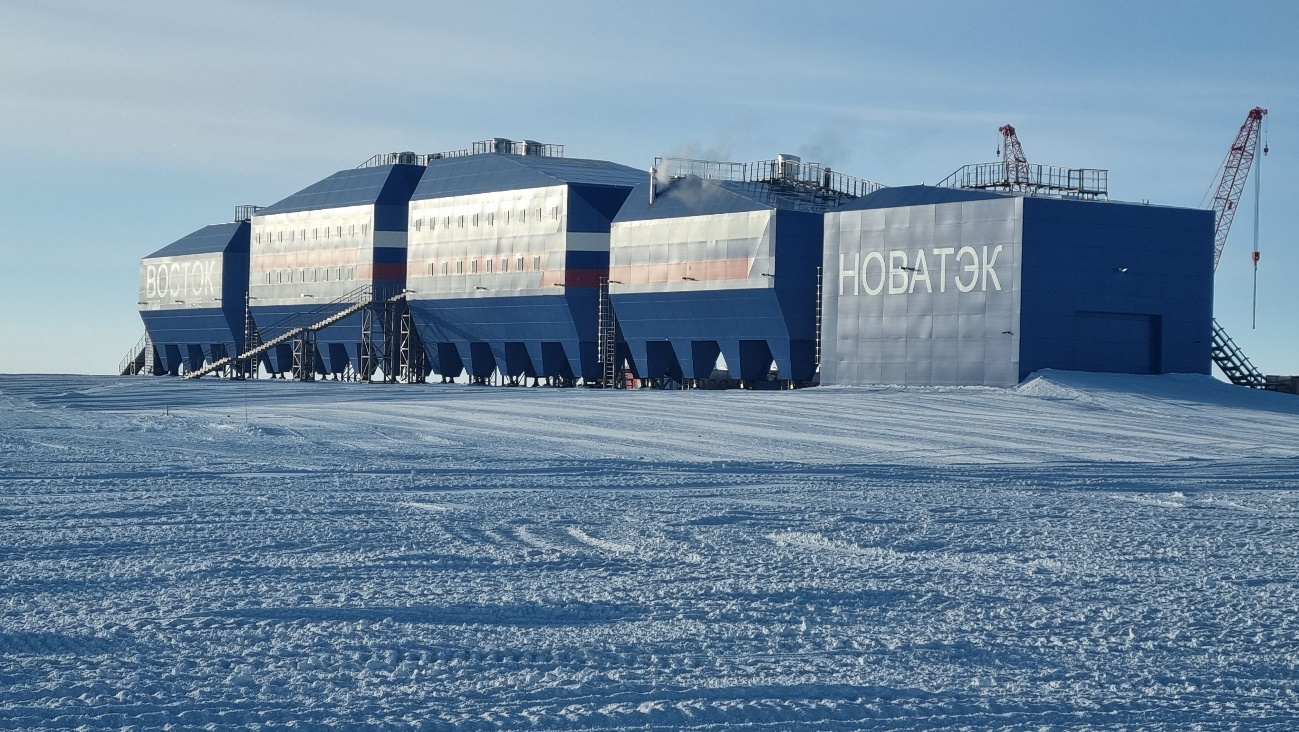
- Vostok Station as of 2024

- Location of Vostok Station in Antarctica
- Coordinates: 78°27′52″S 106°50′14″E
- Country: Russia
- Location: Princess Elizabeth Land; Antarctica
- Administered by: Arctic and Antarctic Research Institute
- Established: 16 December 1957
- Named for: Vostok
- Elevation: 3,488 m (11,444 ft)

Population (2017)
  - Summer: 30
  - Winter: 15
- Time zone: UTC+6
- UN/LOCODE: AQ VOS
- Type: All-year round
- Period: Annual
- Status: Operational
- Activities: List: Ice core drill; Magnetometry; Climatology
- Website: aari.aq/default_en.html

Vostok Skiway
- IATA: none; ICAO: AT28

Summary
- Airport type: Private
- Location: Princess Elizabeth Land
- Elevation AMSL: 11,447 ft (3,489 m)
- Coordinates: 78°27′58″S 106°50′54″E

Map
- Location of airfield in Antarctica

Runways
Direction	Length		Surface
Direction	ft	m	Surface
03/21	11,933	3,637	Ice

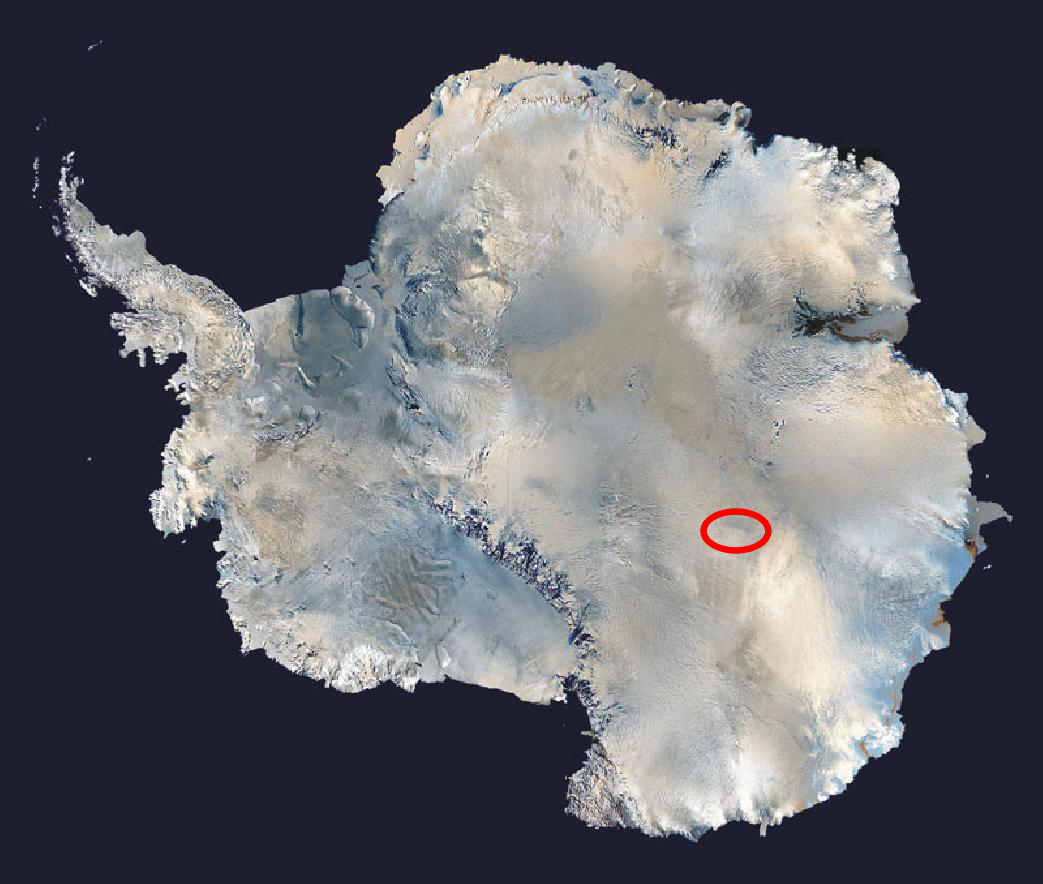
Location of Vostok in Antarctica

Vostok Station (Russian: станция Восток, romanized: stantsiya Vostok, IPA: [ˈstant͡sɨjə vɐˈstok], lit. 'station east') is a Russian research station in inland Princess Elizabeth Land, Antarctica. Founded by the Soviet Union in 1957, the station lies at the southern Pole of Cold, with the lowest reliably measured natural temperature on Earth of −89.2 °C (−128.6 °F; 184.0 K). Research includes ice core drilling and magnetometry. Vostok was named after Vostok, the lead ship of the First Russian Antarctic Expedition captained by Fabian von Bellingshausen. The Bellingshausen Station was named after this captain (the second ship, Mirny, captained by Mikhail Lazarev, became the namesake for Mirny Station).

== Description ==
Vostok Research Station is around 1,301 kilometres (808 mi) from the Geographic South Pole, at the middle of the East Antarctic Ice Sheet.

Vostok is located near the southern pole of inaccessibility and the south geomagnetic pole, making it one of the optimal places to observe changes in the Earth's magnetosphere. Other studies include actinometry, geophysics, medicine and climatology.

The station is at 3,488 metres (11,444 ft) above sea level and is one of the most isolated established research stations on the Antarctic continent. The station was supplied from Mirny Station on the Antarctic coast. The station normally hosts 30 scientists and engineers in the summer. In winter, their number drops to 15.

The only permanent research station located farther south is the Amundsen–Scott South Pole Station, operated by the United States at the geographic South Pole. The Chinese Kunlun Station and Argentine Sobral Base are farther south than Vostok but the former is occupied only during summers and the latter only from September through December.

Some of the challenges faced by those living on the station were described in Vladimir Sanin's books such as Newbie in the Antarctic (1973), 72 Degrees Below Zero (1975), and others.

== History ==
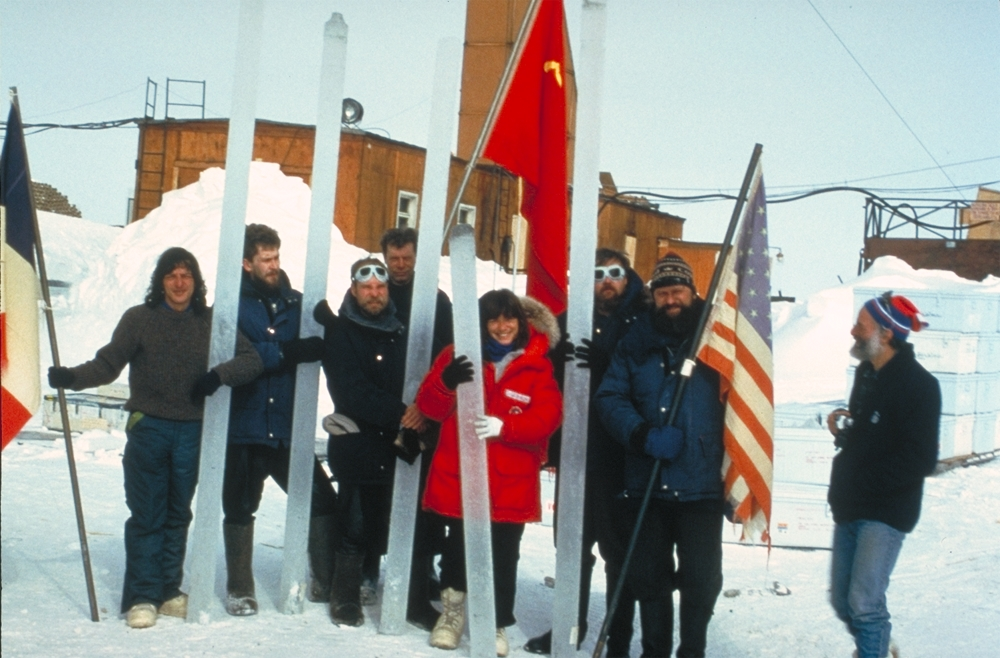
Ice cores at Vostok, with a portion of the station behind

Vostok Station was established on 16 December 1957 (during the International Geophysical Year) by the 2nd Soviet Antarctic Expedition and was operated year-round for more than 72 years. The station was temporarily closed from January 1962 to January 1963, from February to November 1994, and during the winter of 2003.

In 1974, when British scientists in Antarctica performed an airborne ice-penetrating radar survey and detected strange radar readings at the site, the presence of a liquid, freshwater lake below the ice did not instantly spring to mind. In 1991, Jeff Ridley, a remote-sensing specialist with the Mullard Space Science Laboratory at University College London, directed a European satellite called ERS-1 to turn its high-frequency array toward the center of the Antarctic ice cap. It confirmed the 1974 discovery, but it was not until 1993 that the discovery was published in the Journal of Glaciology. Space-based radar revealed that the subglacial body of fresh water was one of the largest lakes in the world—and one of some 140 subglacial lakes in Antarctica. Russian and British scientists delineated the lake in 1996 by integrating a variety of data, including airborne ice-penetrating radar imaging observations and spaceborne radar altimetry. Lake Vostok lies some 4,000 metres (13,000 ft) below the surface of the central Antarctic ice sheet and covers an area of 14,000 square kilometres (5,400 sq mi).

In 2019, the Russian government began construction on a new, modern station building to replace the aging facilities. Construction of the new facility was completed in Saint Petersburg to be transported to Vostok Station by ship, but continuing delays have pushed back completion of the new station to no earlier than 2023.

On January 28, 2024, Russian President Vladimir Putin took part in the ceremony of commissioning the station's wintering complex via video link. The ceremony was also attended by President of Belarus Alexander Lukashenko.

=== Historic monuments ===
Vostok Station Tractor: Heavy tractor AT-T 11, which participated in the first traverse to the south geomagnetic pole, along with a plaque to commemorate the opening of the station in 1957, has been designated a Historic Site or Monument (HSM 11) following a proposal by Russia to the Antarctic Treaty Consultative Meeting.

Professor Kudryashov's Drilling Complex Building: The drilling complex building stands close to Vostok Station at an elevation of 3,488 metres (11,444 ft). It was built in the summer season of 1983–1984. Under the leadership of Professor Boris Kudryashov, ancient ice core samples were obtained. The building has been designated a Historic Site or Monument (HSM 88), following a proposal by Russia to the Antarctic Treaty Consultative Meeting.

== Climate ==
Vostok Station has an ice cap climate (EF), with subzero temperatures year round, typical as with much of Antarctica. Annual precipitation is only 22 millimetres (0.87 in) (all occurring as snow), making it one of the driest places on Earth. On average, Vostok station receives 26 days of snow per year. It is also one of the sunniest places on Earth, despite having no sunshine at all between May and August; there are more hours of sunshine per year than even the sunniest places in South Africa, Australia and the Arabian Peninsula, where they approach those of the Sahara in Northern Africa. Vostok has the highest sunshine total for any calendar month on Earth, at an average of 708.8 hours of sunshine in December, or 22.9 hours daily. It also has the lowest sunshine for any calendar month, with an absolute maximum of 0 hours of sunshine per month during polar night.

Of official weather stations that are currently in operation, Vostok is the coldest on Earth in terms of mean annual temperature. However, it has been disputed that Vostok Station is the coldest-known location on Earth. The now inactive Plateau Station, located on the central Antarctic plateau, is believed to have recorded an average yearly temperature that was consistently lower than that of Vostok Station during the 37-month period that it was active in the late 1960s, and satellite readings have routinely detected colder temperatures in areas between Dome A and Dome F. The most recent record set was the March record low, set on 25 March 2026.

Vostok Station

Climate chart (precipitation, max. and min. temperature)
J	F	M	A	M	J	J	A	S	O	N	D
1 −27 −38	0.7 −39 −50	2 −53 −62	2.4 −61 −68	2.8 −62 −69	2.5 −61 −69	2.2 −62 −70	2.3 −64 −72	2.4 −62 −70	1.9 −52 −63	1.1 −37 −50	0.7 −27 −38
- █ Average max. and min. temperatures in °C
- █ Precipitation totals in mm
Imperial conversion
J	F	M	A	M	J	J	A	S	O	N	D
0 −17 −36	0 −38 −58	0.1 −63 −79	0.1 −78 −90	0.1 −80 −92	0.1 −77 −92	0.1 −80 −95	0.1 −83 −97	0.1 −79 −94	0.1 −61 −82	0 −35 −58	0 −17 −36
- █ Average max. and min. temperatures in °F
- █ Precipitation totals in inches

Climate data for Vostok Station
Month	Jan	Feb	Mar	Apr	May	Jun	Jul	Aug	Sep	Oct	Nov	Dec	Year
Record high °C (°F)	−14.0 (6.8)	−21.0 (−5.8)	−17.7 (0.1)	−33.0 (−27.4)	−38.0 (−36.4)	−33.0 (−27.4)	−34.1 (−29.4)	−34.9 (−30.8)	−34.3 (−29.7)	−30.8 (−23.4)	−24.3 (−11.7)	−14.1 (6.6)	−14.0 (6.8)
Mean daily maximum °C (°F)	−27.0 (−16.6)	−38.7 (−37.7)	−52.9 (−63.2)	−61.1 (−78.0)	−62.0 (−79.6)	−60.6 (−77.1)	−62.4 (−80.3)	−63.9 (−83.0)	−61.6 (−78.9)	−51.5 (−60.7)	−37.2 (−35.0)	−27.1 (−16.8)	−50.5 (−58.9)
Daily mean °C (°F)	−32.0 (−25.6)	−44.3 (−47.7)	−57.9 (−72.2)	−64.8 (−84.6)	−65.8 (−86.4)	−65.3 (−85.5)	−66.7 (−88.1)	−67.9 (−90.2)	−66.0 (−86.8)	−57.1 (−70.8)	−42.6 (−44.7)	−31.8 (−25.2)	−55.2 (−67.3)
Mean daily minimum °C (°F)	−37.5 (−35.5)	−50.0 (−58.0)	−61.8 (−79.2)	−67.8 (−90.0)	−69.1 (−92.4)	−68.9 (−92.0)	−70.4 (−94.7)	−71.5 (−96.7)	−70.2 (−94.4)	−63.1 (−81.6)	−49.8 (−57.6)	−38.0 (−36.4)	−59.8 (−75.7)
Record low °C (°F)	−56.4 (−69.5)	−64.0 (−83.2)	−76.4 (−105.5)	−86.0 (−122.8)	−81.2 (−114.2)	−83.8 (−118.8)	−89.2 (−128.6)	−88.3 (−126.9)	−85.9 (−122.6)	−79.4 (−110.9)	−63.9 (−83.0)	−50.1 (−58.2)	−89.2 (−128.6)
Average precipitation mm (inches)	1.0 (0.04)	0.7 (0.03)	2.0 (0.08)	2.4 (0.09)	2.8 (0.11)	2.5 (0.10)	2.2 (0.09)	2.3 (0.09)	2.4 (0.09)	1.9 (0.07)	1.1 (0.04)	0.7 (0.03)	22 (0.9)
Average relative humidity (%)	70.1	68.6	66.2	64.7	64.7	65.5	65.7	65.8	66.2	67.4	68.7	69.8	67
Mean monthly sunshine hours	696.4	566.8	347.3	76.3	0.0	0.0	0.0	0.0	203.4	480.2	682.3	708.8	3,761.5
Mean daily sunshine hours	22.5	20.2	11.2	2.5	0.0	0.0	0.0	0.0	6.8	15.5	22.7	22.9	10.4
Source 1:
Source 2: Pogoda.ru.net (data for record highs/lows, except for March and August lows, and March high); (March record low), (August record low), and (March record high)

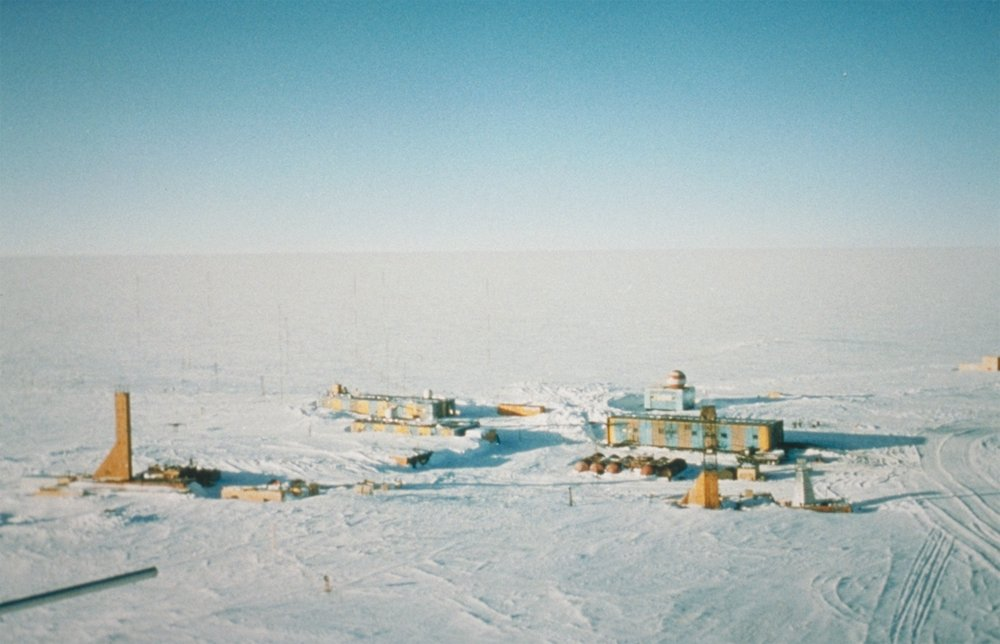
Panoramic photo of Vostok Station showing the layout of the camp. The striped building on the left is the power station while the striped building on the right is where researchers sleep and take meals. The building in the background with the red- and white-striped ball on top is the meteorology building. Caves were dug into the ice sheet for storage, keeping cores at an ideal −55 °C (−67 °F) year-round. (Credit: Todd Sowers LDEO, Columbia University, Palisades, New York)

Vostok is one of the coldest places on Earth. The average temperature of the cold season (from April to September) is about −66 °C (−87 °F), while the average temperature of the warm season (from October to March) is about −44 °C (−47 °F).

The lowest reliably measured temperature on Earth of −89.2 °C (−128.6 °F) was in Vostok on 21 July 1983 at 05:45 Moscow Time, which was 07:45 for Vostok's time zone, and 01:45 UTC (See List of weather records). This beat the station's former record of −88.3 °C (−126.9 °F) on 24 August 1960. Lower temperatures occurred higher up towards the summit of the ice sheet as temperature decreases with height along the surface.

Though unconfirmed, it has been reported that Vostok reached a temperature of −91 °C (−132 °F) on 28 July 1997.

The warmest recorded temperature at Vostok is −14.0 °C (6.8 °F), which occurred on 5 January 1974.

The coldest month was August 1987 with a mean temperature of −75.4 °C (−103.7 °F) and the warmest month was December 1989 with a mean temperature of −28 °C (−18 °F).

In addition to the extremely cold temperatures, other factors make Vostok one of the most difficult places on Earth for human habitation:

- An almost complete lack of moisture in the air
- An average windspeed of 5 metres per second (11 mph; 18 km/h), sometimes rising to as high as 27 metres per second (60 mph; 97 km/h)
- The lack of oxygen in the air because of its high elevation at 3,488 metres (11,444 feet)
- A higher ionization of the air
- A polar night that lasts approximately 120 days, from late April to mid-August, including 85 continuous days of civil polar night (i.e. too dark to read, during which the sun is more than 6 degrees below the horizon)

Acclimatization to such conditions can take from a week to two months and is accompanied by headaches, eye twitches, ear pains, nose bleeds, perceived suffocation, sudden rises in blood pressure, loss of sleep, reduced appetite, vomiting, joint and muscle pain, arthritis, and weight loss of 3–5 kg (7–11 lb) (sometimes as high as 12 kg (26 lb)).

== Ice core drilling ==
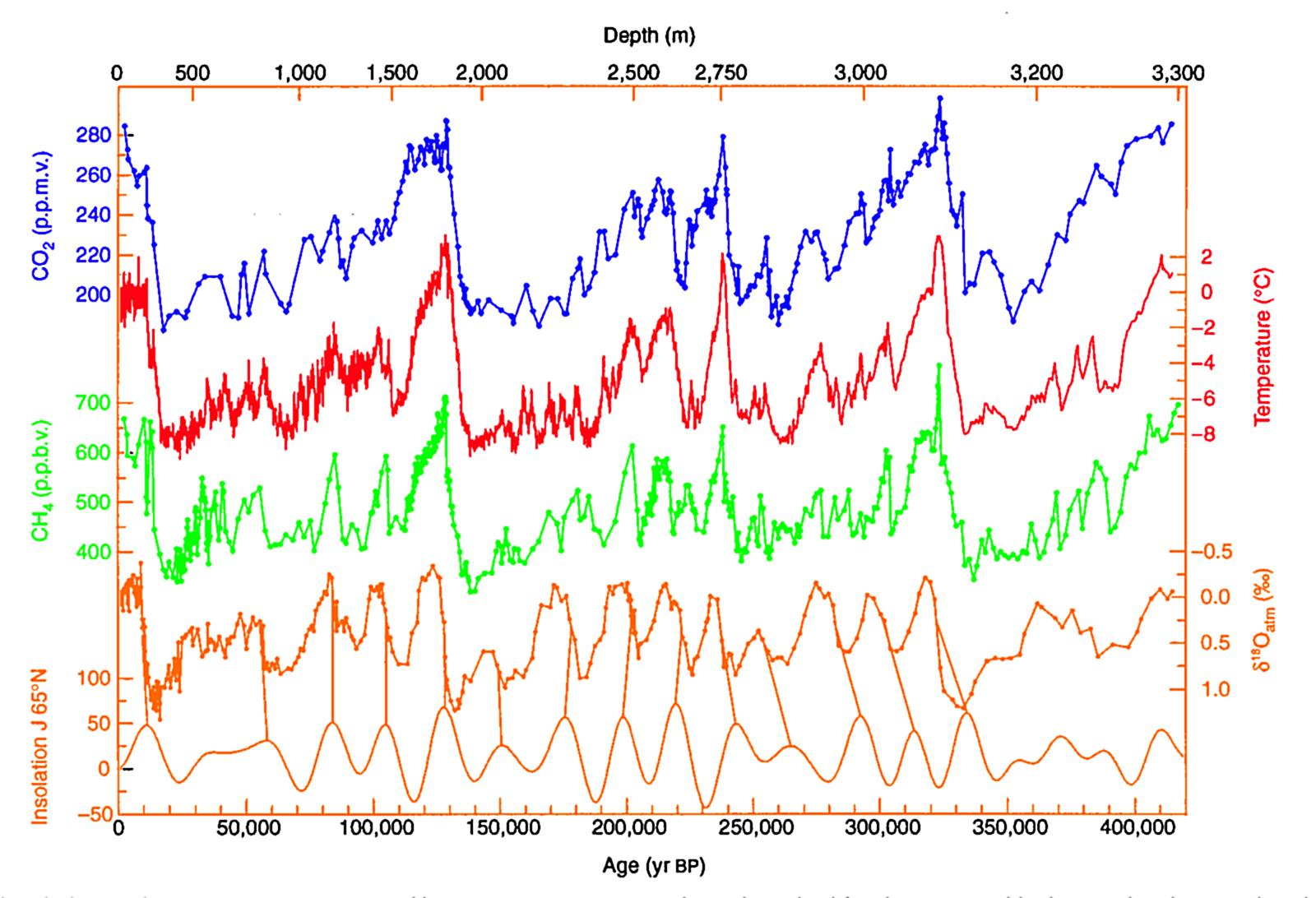
420,000 years of ice core data from Vostok, Antarctica, research station. Current period is at left. From bottom to top: insolation at 65°N due to Milankovitch cycles (connected to ^{18}O); ^{18}O isotope of oxygen; levels of methane (CH_{4}); relative temperature; levels of carbon dioxide (CO_{2})

In the 1970s, the Soviet Union drilled a set of cores 500–952 metres (1,640–3,123 ft) deep. These have been used to study the oxygen isotope composition of the ice, which showed that ice of the last glacial period was present below about 400 metres' depth. Then three more holes were drilled: in 1984, Hole 3G reached a final depth of 2,202 m; in 1990, Hole 4G reached a final depth of 2,546 m; and in 1993 Hole 5G reached a depth of 2,755 m; after a brief closure, drilling continued during the winter of 1995. In 1996 it was stopped at a depth of 3,623 m, by the request of the Scientific Committee on Antarctic Research which expressed worries about possible contamination of Lake Vostok. This ice core, drilled collaboratively with the French, produced a record of past environmental conditions stretching back 420,000 years and covering four previous glacial periods. For a long time, it was the only core to cover several glacial cycles; but in 2004 it was exceeded by the EPICA core, which, while shallower, covers a longer time span. In 2003, drilling was permitted to continue but was halted at the estimated distance to the lake of only 130 metres (430 ft).

The ancient lake was finally breached on 5 February 2012 when scientists stopped drilling at the depth of 3,770 metres (12,370 ft) and reached the surface of the subglacial lake.

The brittle zone is approximately between 250 and 750 m and corresponds to the Last Glacial Maximum, with the end of the Holocene climatic optimum at or near the 250-metre depth.

Although the Vostok core reached a depth of 3,623 metres (11,886 ft) the usable climatic information does not extend down this far. The very bottom of the core is ice refrozen from the waters of Lake Vostok and contains no climate information. The usual data sources give proxy information down to a depth of 3,310 metres (10,860 ft) or 414,000 years. Below this there is evidence of ice deformation. It has been suggested that the Vostok record may be extended down to 3,345 m or 436,000 years, to include more of the interesting MIS11 period, by inverting a section of the record. This then produces a record in agreement with the newer, longer EPICA record, although it provides no new information.

== See also ==
- List of Antarctic research stations
- List of Antarctic field camps
- List of airports in Antarctica
- Vostok traverse
- Concordia Station
