= National Antarctic Research Program =

National Antarctic Research Program (Programma Nazionale di Ricerche in Antartide or PNRA) is the Italian Antarctic research program.

The PNRA is directed by the Ministry of Education, University and Research (MIUR) through two national bodies: the National Research Council of Italy (CNR) for the coordination of scientific research and the National Agency for New Technologies, Energy and Sustainable Economic Development (ENEA) for the implementation of the Antarctic expeditions, for logistics and the maintenance of the two Antarctic stations.

Italy started its National Antarctic Program in 1985 with the formation of the Programma Nazionale di Ricerche in Antartide (PNRA) and the National Scientific Committee for Antarctica (CSNA).

Italy maintains two Antarctic research stations. The first one, built in 1986, is Mario Zucchelli Station at Terra Nova Bay, a permanent station. In 1993, Italy and France agreed to build a joint station at Dome C, named Concordia, which was inaugurated in 1997 and has operated as a year-round station since 2005, accommodating 15 persons in the winter and 60 in the summer. For shuttling to Antarctic stations and field camps, every year PNRA charters aircraft, helicopters, and a cargo/research ship.

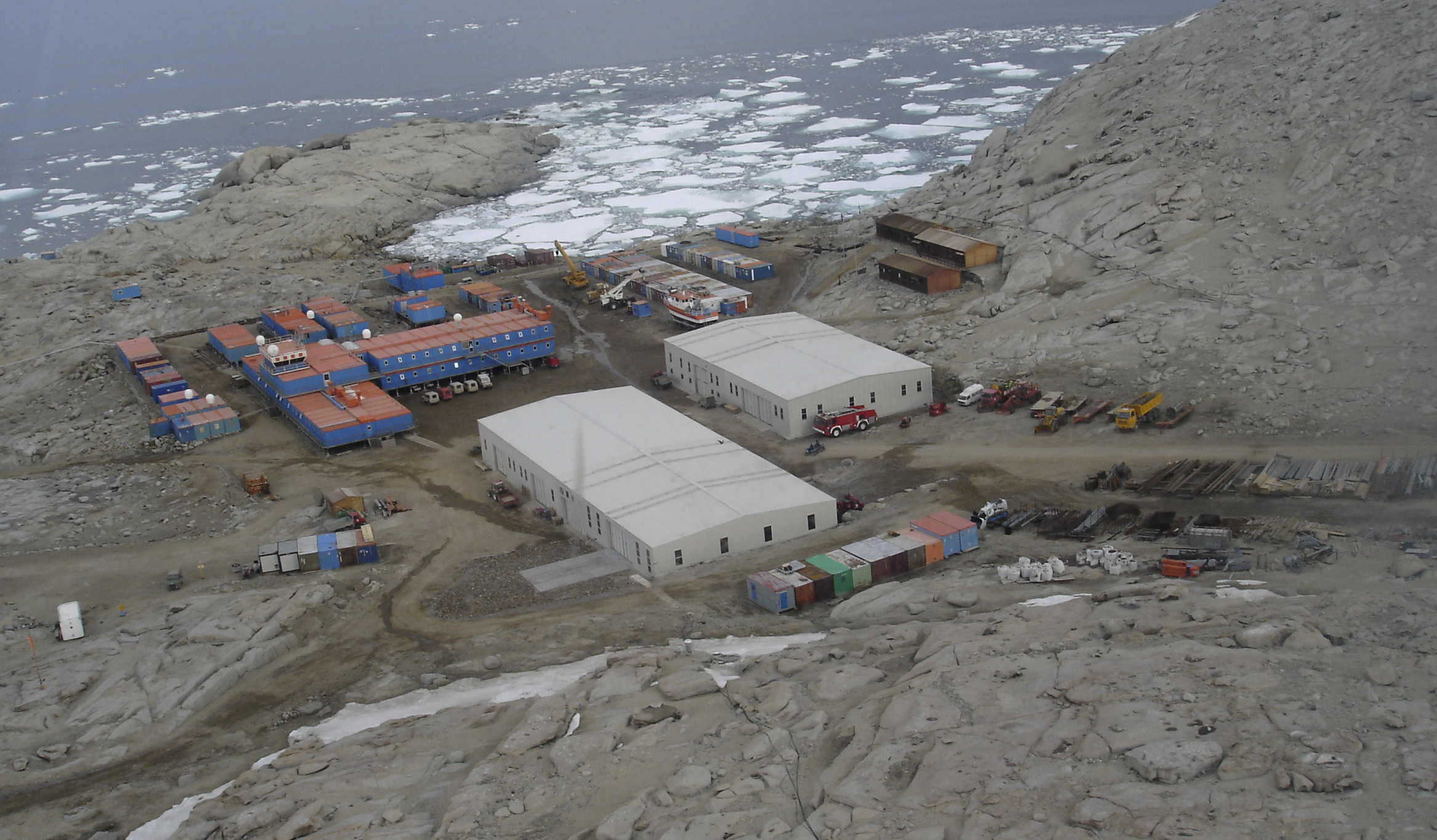
Mario Zucchelli Station - Terra Nova Bay

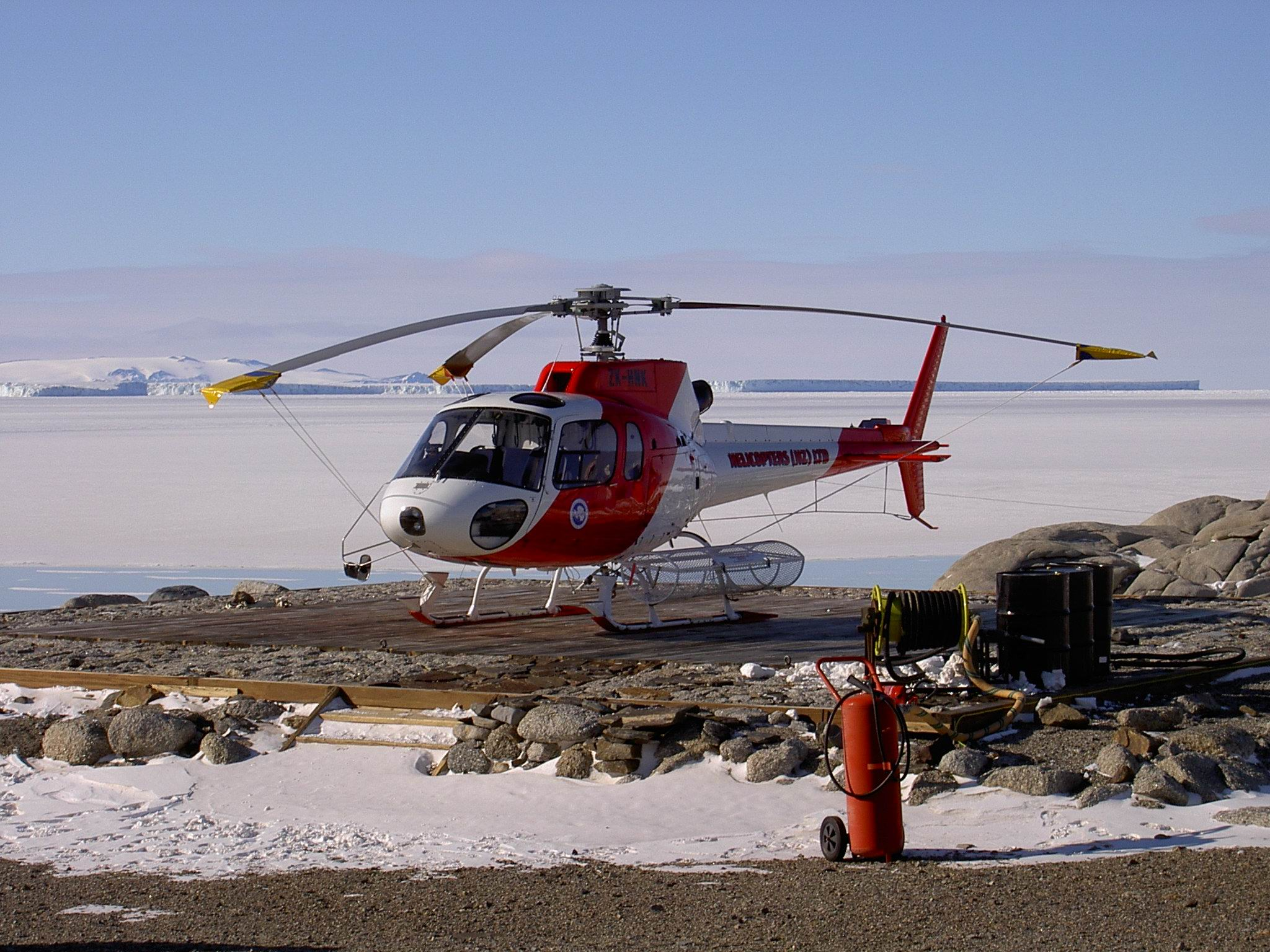
A helicopter at Mario Zucchelli Station

== Mario Zucchelli Station ==
Technical plants:

- a unit for electrical and thermal energy generation, with four diesel generators (made up of two couples)
- a co-generation system for the exploitation of the thermal energy produced by the power generators
- a drinkable water production machine by desalting seawater
- a burner and a wastewater cleaner
- a nitrogen and a helium liquefiers

Research topics:

Offshore marine biology, terrestrial biology, oceanography, geomagnetic observations, geodesy, onshore geology, glaciology, meteorological observations, ionospheric/auroral observations, cosmic ray observations, seismology and environmental monitoring.

== Concordia Station ==
The station is a joint French-Italian research facility, managed by PNRA (National Antarctic Research Program) and IPEV (Institut Polaire Français).

Research topics:

Human biology, geomagnetic observations, geodesy, glaciology, meteorological observations, astronomy, seismology and environmental monitoring.
