= Concordia Station =

- Antarctic base
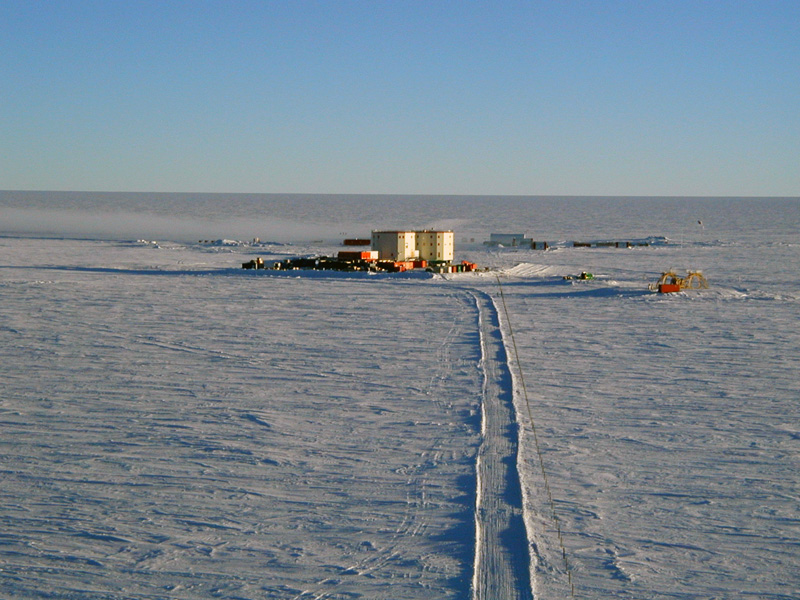
- Concordia Research Station at dome Circe, Charlie or Concordia.

- Location of Condordia Station in Antarctica
- Coordinates: 75°05′59″S 123°19′56″E
- Country: France; Italy
- Location in Antarctica: Dome C Antarctic Plateau
- Administered by: PRNA; IPEV
- Established: 2005
- Elevation: 3,233 m (10,607 ft)

Population (2017)
  - Summer: 70
  - Winter: 13
- UN/LOCODE: AQ CON
- Type: All Year-round
- Period: Annual
- Status: Operational
- Activities: List: Human biology; Glaciology; Astronomy
- Website: Concordia Programma Nazionale di Ricerche in Antartide / Concordia Institut Polaire Français

Concordia Research Station, which opened in 2005, is a French–Italian research facility managed by l'Institut polaire français Paul-Émile Victor and Programma Nazionale di Ricerche in Antartide, that was built 3,233 m (10,607 ft) above sea level on a geographical formation known as dôme C, on the Antarctic Plateau, Antarctica. It is located 1,100 km (680 mi) inland from the French research station at Dumont D'Urville, 1,100 km (680 mi) inland from Australia's Casey Station and 1,200 km (750 mi) inland from the Italian Zucchelli Station at Terra Nova Bay. Russia's Vostok Station is 560 km (350 mi) away. The Geographic South Pole is 1,670 km (1,040 mi) away. The facility is also located within Australia's claim on Antarctica, the Australian Antarctic Territory.

Concordia Station is the third permanent, all-year research station on the Antarctic Plateau besides Vostok Station and the Amundsen–Scott South Pole Station (U.S.) at the Geographic South Pole. It is jointly operated by scientists from France and Italy and regularly hosts ESA scientists.

The station is also known as Concordia camp, and previously as Dome Charlie.

== History ==
The first research work at dôme C began during 1978. In 1982 the French first had the idea to build a permanent base at the dôme.

In 1992, France built a new station on the Antarctic Plateau. The program was later joined by Italy in 1993.

In 1995, Pr. Jean Vernin from University of Nice Sophia-Antipolis and Pr. Giorgio Dall'Oglio from University of Rome performed the first scientific experience towards a site qualification at dôme C.

In 1996, a French-Italian team established a summer camp at dôme C. The two main objectives of the camp were the provision of logistical support for the European Project for Ice Coring in Antarctica (EPICA) and the construction of a permanent research station.

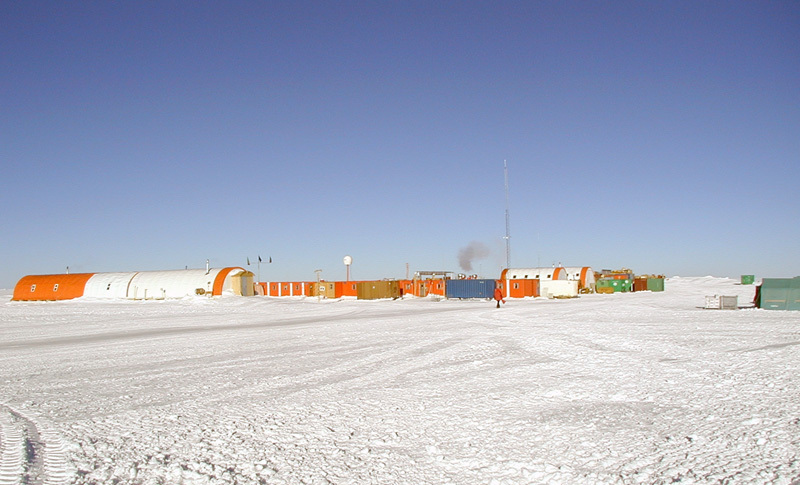
The main part of the summer camp at Dome C (Concordia) Station in January 2005

While the station has been in use for summer campaigns since December 1997, the first winterover was only begun in February 2005 in the new all-year facility, Concordia Station with a staff of 13 (eleven French and 2 Italians). During winterovers the station is inaccessible, requiring total autonomy.

During February 2022 initial ice core extraction of the Beyond Epica-Oldest Ice research activity was completed, located 34 km from the station.

== Transportation ==
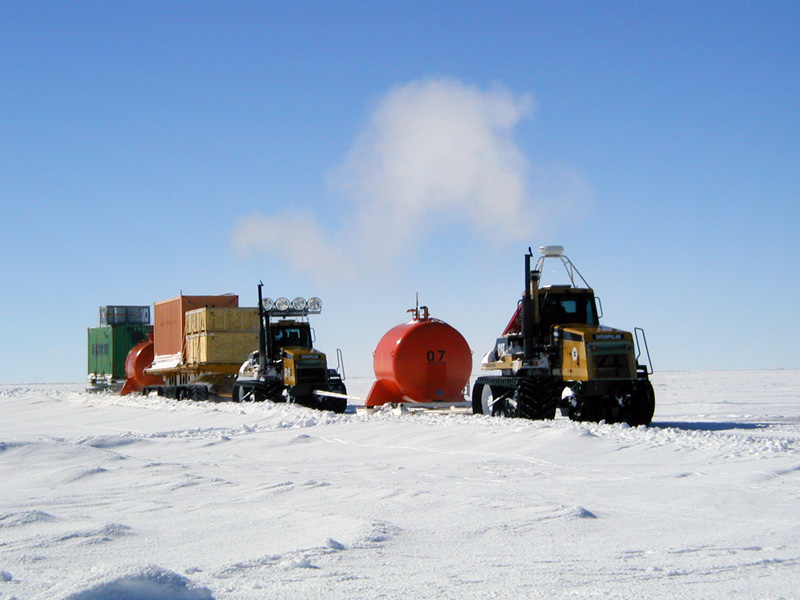
Part of a traverse, which was bringing fuel, food, and other supplies from Dumont d'Urville Station to Dome C (January 2005)

Most of the cargo is moved to Dome C by traverse (called raid) from Dumont d'Urville Station, covering 1,200 kilometres (750 mi) in 7 to 12 days depending on weather conditions. Station personnel and light cargo arrive by air, landing on a Skiway, using the Twin Otters or Basler BT-67 flying from DDU or Zucchelli Station at 1,200 kilometres (750 mi).

== Environment ==
Dome C is situated on top of the Antarctic Plateau. No animals or plants live at a distance of more than a few tens of kilometers from the Southern Ocean. However, south polar skuas have been spotted overflying the station, 1,200 km away from their nearest food sources. It is believed that these birds have learned to cross the continent instead of circumnavigating it.

== Human biology and medicine ==
Concordia Station shares many stressor characteristics similar to that of long-duration deep-space missions, in particular extreme isolation and confinement, and therefore serves as a useful analogue platform for research relevant to space medicine. During the winter, the crew are isolated from the outside world, having no transportation and limited communication for 9 months and live a prolonged period in complete darkness, at an altitude almost equivalent to 4000m at the equator. This creates physiological and psychological strains on the crew. Concordia station is particularly useful for the study of chronic hypobaric hypoxia, stress secondary to confinement and isolation, circadian rhythm and sleep disruption, individual and group psychology, telemedicine, and astrobiology. Concordia station has been proposed as one of the real-life Earth-based analogues for long-duration deep-space missions.

== Glaciology ==
In the 1970s, Dome C was the site of ice core drilling by field teams of several nations. In the 1990s, Dome C was chosen for deep ice core drilling by the European Project for Ice Coring in Antarctica (EPICA). Drilling at Dome C began in 1996 and was completed on 21 December 2004, reaching a drilling depth of 3270.2 m, 5 m above bedrock. The age of the oldest recovered ice is estimated to be ca. 900,000 years.

== Astronomy ==
Concordia Station has been identified as a suitable location for astronomical observations. The transparency of the Antarctic atmosphere permits the observation of stars even when the sun is at an elevation angle of 38°. Other advantages include the very low infrared sky emission, the high percentage of cloud-free time and the low aerosol and dust content of the atmosphere.

The median seeing measured with a DIMM Differential Image Motion Monitor placed on top of an 8.5 m high tower is 1.3 ± 0.8 arcseconds. This is significantly worse than most major observatory sites, but similar to other observatories in Antarctica. However, Lawrence et al. considered other features of the site and concluded that "Dome C is the best ground-based site to develop a new astronomical observatory", a conclusion made before whole-atmospheric seeing measurements had been made at Dome C.

Thanks to the Single Star Scidar SSS, Vernin, Chadid and Aristidi et al. and Giordano, Vernin and Chadid et al. finally demonstrated that most of the optical turbulence is concentrated within the first 30 m atmospheric level at Dome C. The rest of the atmosphere is very quiet with a seeing of about 0.3-0.4 arcseconds, and the overall seeing is somewhat around 1.0 arcseconds.

Launched in 2007, PAIX, the first robotic multi-color Antarctica Photometer gives a new insight to cope with unresolved stellar enigma and stellar oscillation challenges. Chadid, Vernin, Preston et al. implement, for the first time from the ground, a new way to study the stellar oscillations, pulsations and their evolutionary properties with long uninterrupted and continuous precision observations over 150 days, and without the regular interruptions imposed by the Earth rotation. PAIX achieves astrophysical UBVRI bands time-series measurements of stellar physics fields, rivaling photometry from space.

The Antarctic Search for Transiting ExoPlanets (ASTEP) programme is composed of two telescopes: a 10 cm refractor installed in 2008, and a 40 cm telescope installed in 2010 and upgraded in 2022.

== Climate ==
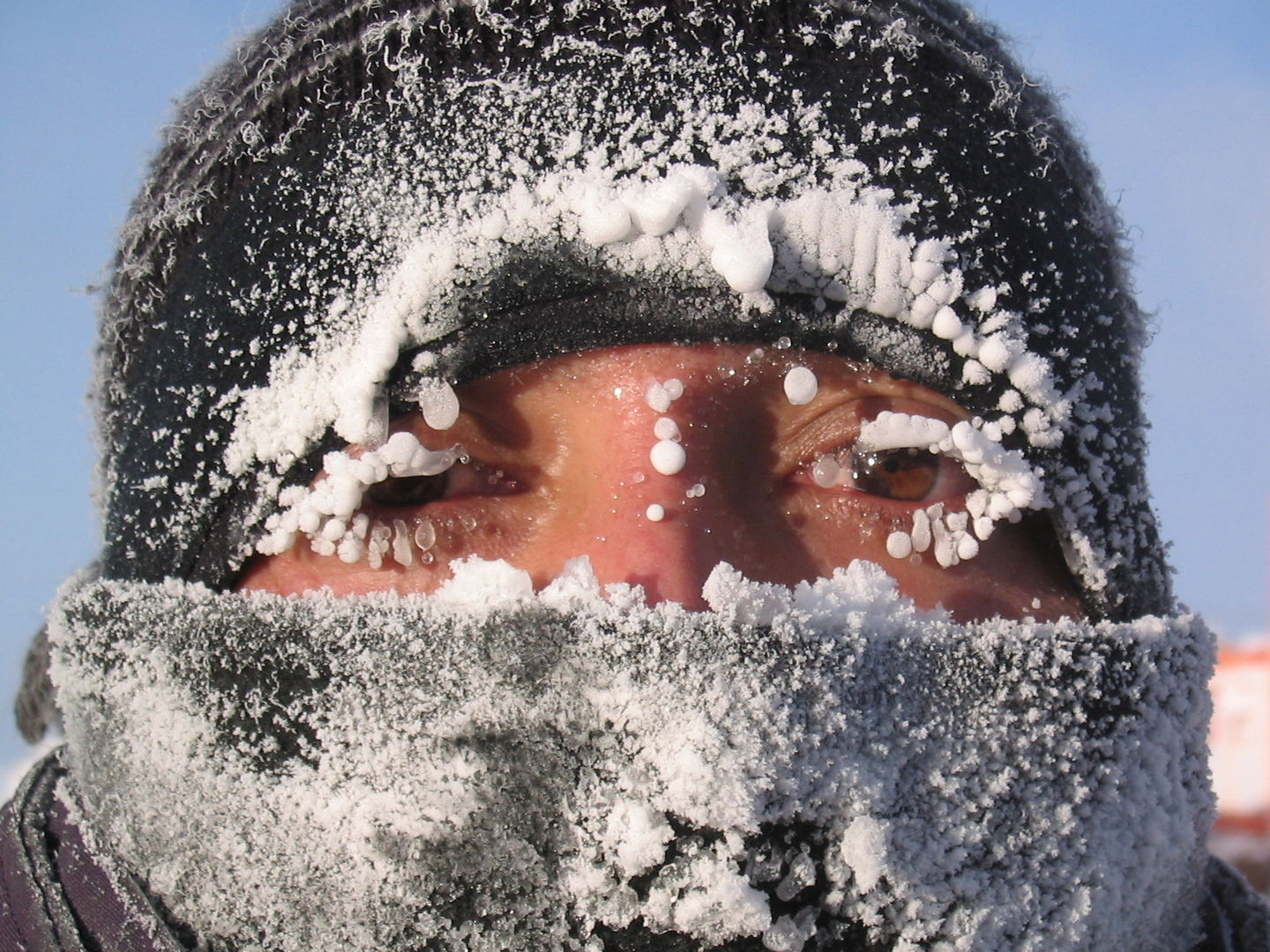
Frozen face of wintering personnel (Christophe Mozer) during first Dome C winterover (2005)

The climate at Dome C where Concordia Station is located is frigid all year round, being one of the coldest places on Earth. It has a polar ice cap climate (Köppen EF), with maximums ranging from −24.8 °C (−12.6 °F) in December to −62 °C (−80 °F) in May, mean ranging from −30.4 °C (−22.7 °F) in December to −65.3 °C (−85.5 °F) in May and minimums ranging from −36.1 °C (−33.0 °F) in December to −68.7 °C (−91.7 °F) in May. The annual average air temperature is −54.5 °C (−66.1 °F). The station has never recorded a temperature above freezing; the warmest temperature recorded was −5.4 °C (22.3 °F) in January. Temperatures can fall below −80 °C (−112 °F) in winter, and the coldest recorded temperature was −84.6 °C (−120.3 °F) in August 2010; one of the coldest temperatures ever recorded on Earth.

Humidity is low and it is also very dry, with very little precipitation throughout the year.

Dome C does not experience the katabatic winds typical for the coastal regions of Antarctica because of its elevated location and its relative distance from the edges of the Antarctic Plateau. Typical wind speed in winter is 2.8 m/s.

Climate data for Concordia
Month	Jan	Feb	Mar	Apr	May	Jun	Jul	Aug	Sep	Oct	Nov	Dec	Year
Record high °C (°F)	−5.4 (22.3)	−12.9 (8.8)	−11.5 (11.3)	−32.9 (−27.2)	−28.5 (−19.3)	−30.2 (−22.4)	−25.4 (−13.7)	−26.5 (−15.7)	−30.3 (−22.5)	−23.1 (−9.6)	−17.0 (1.4)	−9.4 (15.1)	−5.4 (22.3)
Mean daily maximum °C (°F)	−24.9 (−12.8)	−33.7 (−28.7)	−48.7 (−55.7)	−58.5 (−73.3)	−62.0 (−79.6)	−58.9 (−74.0)	−58.4 (−73.1)	−57.8 (−72.0)	−54.1 (−65.4)	−44.8 (−48.6)	−32.5 (−26.5)	−24.8 (−12.6)	−46.6 (−51.9)
Daily mean °C (°F)	−31.1 (−24.0)	−40.6 (−41.1)	−54.0 (−65.2)	−61.9 (−79.4)	−65.3 (−85.5)	−62.3 (−80.1)	−62.1 (−79.8)	−61.7 (−79.1)	−59.5 (−75.1)	−52.2 (−62.0)	−39.3 (−38.7)	−30.4 (−22.7)	−51.7 (−61.1)
Mean daily minimum °C (°F)	−37.5 (−35.5)	−47.7 (−53.9)	−59.4 (−74.9)	−65.4 (−85.7)	−68.7 (−91.7)	−65.8 (−86.4)	−66.0 (−86.8)	−65.8 (−86.4)	−65.2 (−85.4)	−59.8 (−75.6)	−46.2 (−51.2)	−36.1 (−33.0)	−57.0 (−70.5)
Record low °C (°F)	−49.8 (−57.6)	−60.0 (−76.0)	−74.2 (−101.6)	−78 (−108)	−79.6 (−111.3)	−82.2 (−116.0)	−84.1 (−119.4)	−84.6 (−120.3)	−81.9 (−115.4)	−74.0 (−101.2)	−61.9 (−79.4)	−45.9 (−50.6)	−84.6 (−120.3)

== See also ==
- List of research stations in Antarctica
- List of Antarctic field camps
- List of airports in Antarctica
- Amundsen–Scott South Pole Station
- Casey Station
- Concordia Subglacial Lake
- Dome A, also known as Dome Argus
- Dome C, also known as Dome Charlie or Dome Circe
- Dome F, also known as Dome Fuji
- Dumont d'Urville Station
- EPICA
- Ice core
- Law Dome
- Neumayer Station III
- Vostok Station
- Zucchelli Station
- List of Mars analogs
