= ENEA (Italy) =

Italian government energy agency

Agenzia nazionale per le nuove tecnologie, l'energia e lo sviluppo economico sostenibile
- Established: 1952 (as CNRN)
- Mission: R&D
- Focus: Technologies for energy and environment
- Staff: 2,279 (2024)
- Budget: €298 million
- Location: Rome, Italy
- Website: enea.it

The Agenzia nazionale per le nuove tecnologie, l'energia e lo sviluppo economico sostenibile (ENEA; Italian National Agency for New Technologies, Energy and Sustainable Economic Development) is an Italian Government-sponsored research and development agency. The agency undertakes research in areas which will help to develop and enhance Italian competitiveness and employment, while protecting the environment. The acronym ENEA originally stood for Energia Nucleare ed Energie Alternative ("Atomic Energy and Alternative Energy"), but the agency's name and mission have changed since (see History).

== History ==
ENEA's history began in 1952 with the creation of the National Committee for Nuclear Research (CNRN) at the National Research Council (CNR), which became the National Committee for Nuclear Energy (CNEN) in 1960.

Initially (1982), ENEA was an acronym that stood for Energia Nucleare ed Energie Alternative ("Atomic Energy and Alternative Energy"), according to its mission statement.

After a referendum against the production of atomic energy in Italy (following the Chernobyl disaster in 1986) passed in 1987, in 1991 ENEA's mission statement was changed and, consequently, its complete name, which became Ente per le nuove tecnologie, l'energia e l'ambiente ("Agency for new technologies, energy and environment").

In January 1999 a new charter redefined the goals for the agency as follows:

- To undertake initiatives aimed at developing, enhancing and promoting research and innovation, in keeping with Italy's EU and international commitments in terms of energy efficiency, environmental protection and technological innovation.
- To support the implementation of high-tech production processes, especially by promoting demand for research and technology oriented towards enhancing sustainable development.
- To promote the transfer of technology and developments in the fields of energy efficiency and environmental protection to public administrations and businesses, in keeping with national and EU guidelines.
- To provide, upon request, specialist technical and organisational support to administrations promoting public initiatives at the international, national, regional and local levels, in all the sectors falling within ENEA's purview.

In July 2009 the Italian parliament passed a law redefining ENEA's mission statement, including to back atomic energy, and consequently changing its complete name to the current one.

After the Fukushima Daiichi nuclear disaster in 2011, a second referendum against atomic energy production was held, and passed again. In December 2015, article 4 of Italian Law no. 221 of 28 December 2015 redefined ENEA's structure and mission, following almost a decade of compulsory administration.

In the nuclear sector ENEA participates in the development of the ITER fusion reactor to produce clean energy. Through the ICAS consortium, ENEA's Superconducting Laboratory contributed to the production of the superconducting conductor for ITER's toroidal field magnets.

== Research centers ==
Besides the headquarters in Rome, ENEA carries out its activities in nine research centers and five laboratories in Italy:

- Bologna Research Center
- Brasimone Research Center (near Bologna)
- Brindisi Research Center
- Casaccia Research Center (Roma)
- Faenza Research Laboratory
- Foggia Research Laboratory
- Frascati Research Center
- Ispra Research Laboratory
- Lampedusa Research Laboratory
- Montecuccolino Research Laboratory (Bologna)
- Portici Research Center
- Santa Teresa Research Center (Pozzuolo di Lerici, near La Spezia)
- Saluggia Research Center
- Trisaia Research Center (near Rotondella)
