= Teodor Negoiță =

Romanian polar region explorer

Teodor Gheorghe Negoiță (September 27, 1947 – March 23, 2011) was a polar region explorer. In 1995 he became the first known Romanian explorer to reach the North Pole.

== Biography ==
Negoiță was born on September 27, 1947, in the commune of Sascut in Bacău County, Romania. His parents were both teachers, and their home library included many old books on travel. From a young age, he was fascinated by descriptions of expeditions in the most difficult-to-traverse regions of the globe.

He attended the Faculty of Industrial Chemistry within the Gheorghe Asachi Technical University of Iași, graduating as a chemical engineer. He was also interested in engineering, trying to modify large installations. He later transferred to a design and research institute in Bucharest.

Negoiță died on March 23, 2011.

== Speleological science ==
Negoiță had a passion for ethnology, and was most interested in the equatorial forests, the Amazon rainforest and New Guinea. In his free time, he studied a group of pygmies from Equatorial Africa. He also corresponded with a Catholic institute in Paris that sent him needed literature, but it was impossible for him to do field research.

He found refuge in a field that he felt he could improve on in his country: speleological science. He was 33 when he learned about alpine speleology. His major field of interest was vertical caves, which with depths of 200–300 metres (660–980 ft) were not well researched. His passion for speleology later evolved into an interest in ice caves. He obtained what he considered to be the best speleology equipment, brought in from Czechoslovakia, and started to embark on a more coherent project than solitary hobby speleology. In 1987 he founded the first Romanian Institute of Polar Research, but it took three years to obtain the funding he needed.

== Arctic expeditions ==
Negoiță organized several Romanian expeditions in the Arctic: in Greenland, the northern areas of Canada, and Spitsbergen island in the (Svalbard) archipelago. He assembled teams of experts including geographers, geologists, engineers, doctors and biologists. These teams may have been the first Romanian teams to participate in cross-border expeditions. In his first expedition, however, five Romanians were lost in a helicopter crash.

He also did some exploration on his own in Greenland and the Spitsbergen (Svalbard) archipelago, travelling approximately 300 kilometres (190 mi) on skis. Negoiță established contact with Danish, Norwegian, Canadian, and Russian researchers, wanting to obtain information on other countries' work so that his Romanian team would be conducting original research.

In 1994 he established the Romanian Institute of Polar Research as a private institution, intending to gather scientists from different fields who had a passion for polar exploration. He obtained funding for the institute's research projects from private sponsors, the Romanian government and European sources. After 1995 he returned to heading Romanian polar expeditions.

Negoiță trained for more than a year to make an expedition to the North Pole on skis during a Russian "last degree" research expedition. This training improved his physical condition to the point that he was able to ski for hundreds of kilometers, resist the cold and pull a sled that weighed 50–100 kilograms (110–220 lb). He trained eight hours a day pulling two tires to simulate the sled he would take to the North Pole. On April 21, 1995, he became the first known Romanian explorer to reach the North Pole on skis during the Russian expedition.

== Antarctic expeditions ==
After the North Pole expedition, Negoiță turned his attention to Antarctica.

Antarctica is the only harsh environment on the planet. Here we find the driest atmosphere on the planet, this provide high quality astronomical studies, atmospheres studies, research regarding climate changes, magnetism research. Over Antarctics lies the largest ozone hole, research regarding pollution can be made at this place, from here we can sample a lot of meteorites, find new minerals, some with special qualities that can become source for new technology. Antarctic is also a “biological laboratory“, extremely interesting for wild life research.

During his Antarctic expeditions, Negoiță earned a doctorate in chemistry by defending a PhD thesis titled "Pollution control in Arctic and Antarctic areas".

== Founder of the first Romanian research station in Antarctica ==
Negoiță's began the groundwork for building a Romanian exploration station in Antarctica in 1997, when he began to publish research essays at the Antarctic Treaty, of which Romania became a member in 1971.

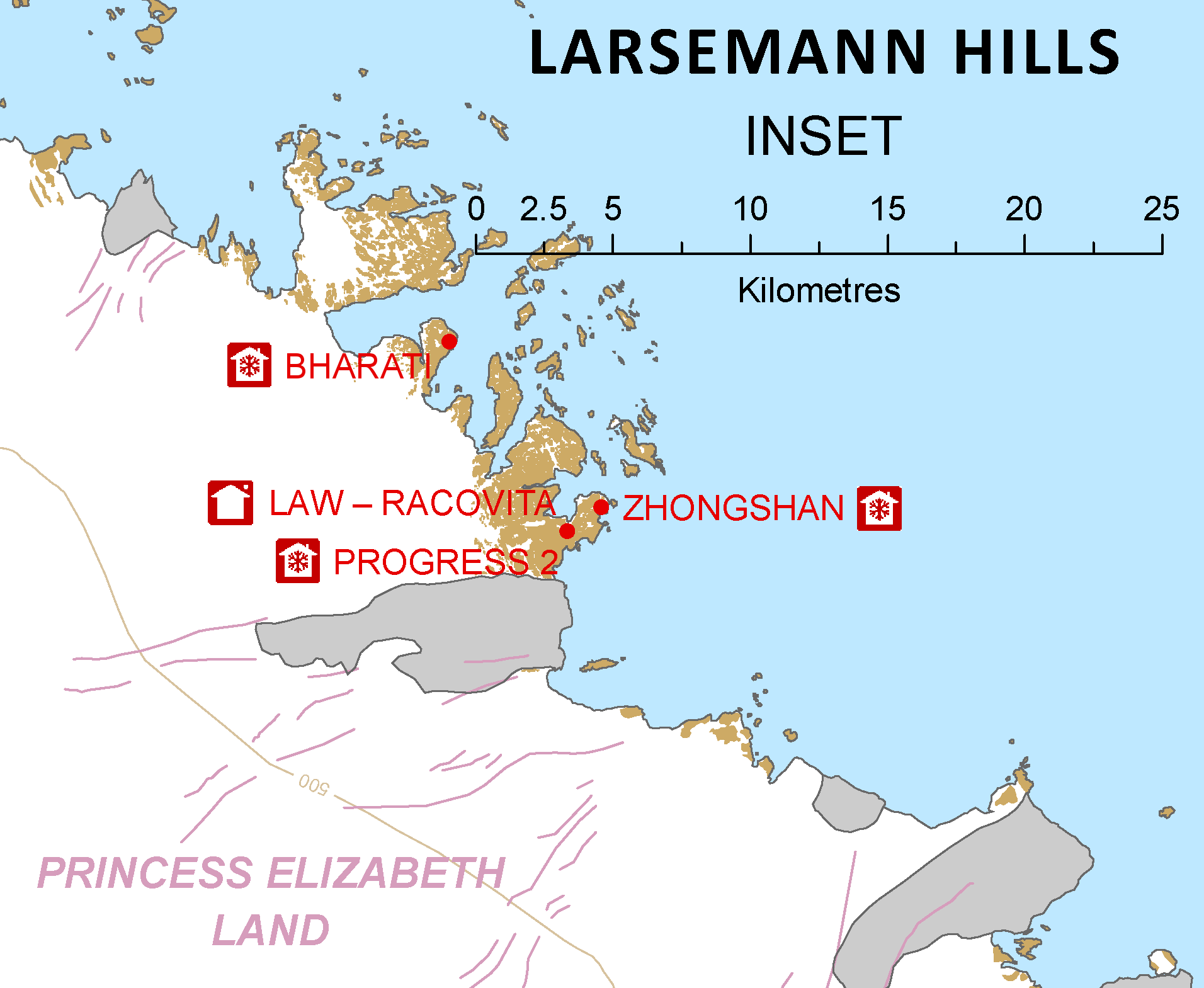
Map showing the Law-Racoviță Station on Antarctica's Larsemann Hills

In 2000 Negoiță gave the opening speech at the Antarctic Treaty meeting in London, before representatives of 43 countries. The goal of the meeting was to regulate naval rules in the Antarctic Seas, and the main arguments centred on the Romanian, American and British essays. Negoiță presented the study "Directions concerning maritime Antarctic transport and environment pollution". At the 2005 Antarctic Treaty meeting in Stockholm, Sweden, an agreement was signed with Australia that gave the Romanian Antarctic Foundation one of Australian's research bases on the Antarctic east coast.

After more than 100 years, I brought Racoviță back in Antarctic regions. The greatest achievement of my career was when I took from the base from the Australians. I got so emotional, that I couldn’t even sign.

Planning to reopen the station in Antarctica, Negoiță made his 13th polar expedition, spending 2 1/2 months in Antarctica. His exploration team included two women, a biologist, Florica Topârceanu and a biochemist, Elena Bocanciu, who were the first Romanian women to visit Antarctica. In addition to reopening the station, the expedition's purpose was to obtain ground samples, sediments and microorganisms. The three members of the expedition arrived in Antarctica on January 13, 2006, and stayed there for 44 days. Preparations for the expedition had been done in the harsh, wintry climate of the Bucegi Mountains.

On January 13, 2006, the Law-Racoviță Station was re-opened, becoming Romania's first research and exploration station in Antarctica. The base was named after the first Australian researcher that explored east Antarctica, Phillip Law, and the first biologist that studied living in Antarctica, Emil Racoviță. It was founded in 1989 by the Australian Government.

"It is a first time in the Romanian Antarctic research, the country that signed the 1971 Antarctic Treaty which gives us the right to use the far south of Antarctica, in peaceful purposes. It is much easier for a country with a global position like Romania to reopen an older base than building a new one," Negoiță said at the opening of the station.

The yearly travel and maintenance for Romania as a result of the station are estimated at about $20,000. The station is in the Princess Elisabeth region near the Larsemann Hills of East Antarctica, 2 km (1.2 mi) from the Russian and Chinese stations. The Romanian expedition cooperates closely with the researchers of these countries, exchanging information. The region is rocky, not icy, and offers numerous access points to the Antarctic icecap. The Romanian research team intended to do bioprospecting, ecological and weather forecasting, measurement of seismic and geomagnetic activity and gathering of data regarding radio communication interference. The station is built from anti-corrosive and thermo-isolating materials, and it consists of a laboratory, a radio station, five bedrooms and a fuel depot.

After Negoiță's death, the Law-Racoviță Station was renamed to Law-Racoviță-Negoiță Station in his honor on December 9, 2011.

== Plans ==
Of the 13 polar expeditions he participated in, eight were led and organized by Negoiță.He expressed desires to do research on the Larsemann Hills by gathering samples from the soil and lakes and carrying out medical tests, pollution studies and climate change surveys. He was also interested in gathering microorganisms and meteorite samples from the ice. He was disappointed, however, that he had trouble funding Antarctic expeditions. The total expedition cost for three researchers to mobilise for three months could be 25,000 euros.

He said, "I started to cry on my own in the middle of the frozen ice land – thinking of the luck the Chinese and Russian researchers were having. From the point of view of the attention that we are given from the state, we are behind even Bulgarians. They get 300,000 dollars per each year from the Bulgarian Minister of Foreign Affairs."

Most European countries, including the former communist countries Russia, Ukraine, and Bulgaria, have research institutes funded by a local academic institution and the Ministry of Foreign Affairs. Romania has no government institute for polar exploration, only the private Romanian Institute of Polar Research, which has a staff of just 10 researchers. For this reason, the Romanian Academy refused to fund the institute, although Negoiţă claimed that there were twenty researchers available in the country.

== Published papers ==
Negoiță published more than 28 scientific papers. To promote his research he used a style that was meant to appeal to the Romanian people rather than just scientists.

His book, Science on ice: With Chinese people in Antarctica (2005), was based on the journal he kept for 130 days in the winter of 2002–2003 during the 19th Chinese expedition to Antarctica.

== Honours and awards ==
In December 2000, Romanian President Emil Constantinescu awarded Negoiță the Order of the Star of Romania, officer rank. In 2008 he was promoted to the rank of Commander in that Order.

== See also ==
- Law-Racoviță-Negoiță Station
