= List of Romanian explorers =

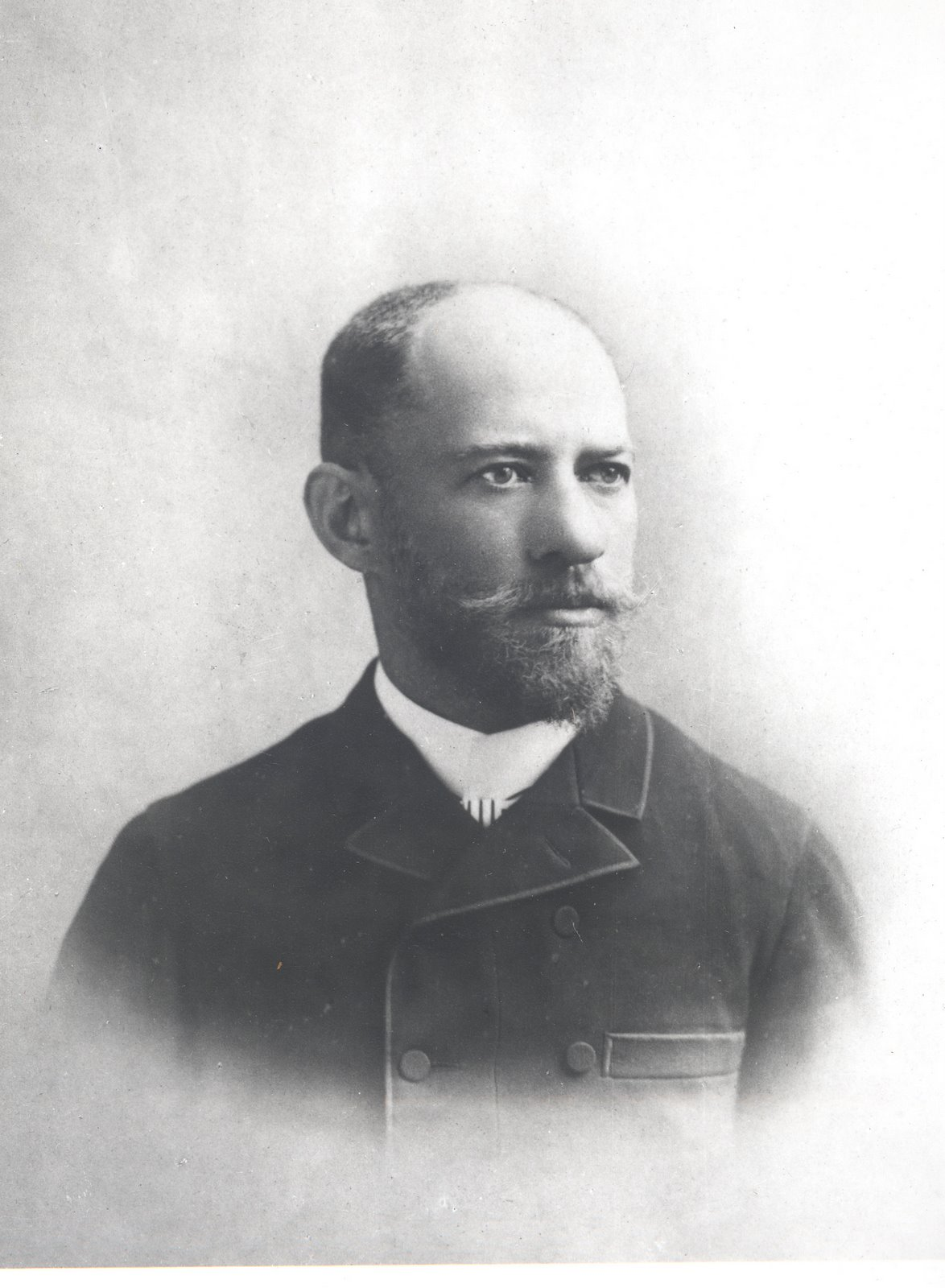
Julius Popper

A list of Romanian explorers:

== Explorers ==
- Nicolae Milescu (1636–1708) — Moldavian writer, traveler, geographer, and diplomat, in 1675, he was named ambassador of the Tsardom of Russia to Beijing, the capital of Qing China, returning to Romania in 1678.
- Prince Dimitrie Ghica-Comănești — from 1894 to 1895, he explored the interior of Somaliland and Abyssinia in Africa; he made botanical discoveries and brought back zoological specimens for the Natural History Museum in Bucharest.
- Julius Popper (1857–1893) — engineer and adventurer, extremely lucky gold seeker, he studied the extremity of South America (Patagonia and Tierra del Fuego).
- Ilarie Mitrea (1842–1904) — doctor in the colonial Dutch Army, in 1869, he travelled deeply into the Indonesian Archipelago (Kalimantan, Sumatra, Sulawesi, Batak and eastern Papua New Guinea) collecting specimens of plants and animals for the Romanian National Natural History Museum.
- Mihai Tican-Rumano — son of a small-town lumberjack, an adventurer, hunter, globetrotter and writer, he traveled to central East Africa in 1925, where he hunted and studied cannibalism first hand.
- Emil Racoviţă or Racovitza (1868–1947) — he traveled to Patagonia and Tierra del Fuego, but most notably he is remembered for his research in Antarctica on board the ship Belgica; he was one of the world's foremost cave explorers, and the international founder for the science of biospelology (study of life in caves).

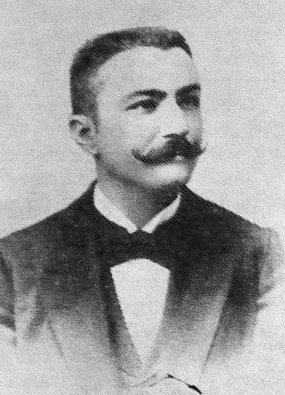
Emil Racoviţă

- Sever Pleniceanu (1867–1924) — doctor, officer and cartographer, he went deep into the interior of the Congo for three years, contracted by the Belgian colonial army; studied equatorial forest pygmy tribes.
- Bazil Assan (1860–1918) — from 1896 to 1897 he travelled and studied Lapland, the Arctic, Spitzbergen, discovering new islands; he later voyaged fully around the world and on his return, with the King of Romania's permission, boarded the NMS Elisabeta warship and took possession of certain unclaimed islands in the Pacific for Romania, but the project fell short for financial reasons.
- Grigoriu Ştefănescu (1836–1911) — geologist, mineralogist and paleontologist, he was mainly interested in volcanoes; at the end of the 19th century, he researched such places as Yellowstone, Mexico, Caucasus, Siberia, Lake Baikal, Scandinavia and wrote eleven books.
- Dumbravă Constantin (1898–1935) — explorer of Greenland, he led a ten-month expedition, in 1928, in Angmassalik region; in 1930 into 1931, he crossed the entire island and studied the Greenlandic Inuit.
- Contantin Chiru (1848–1933)
- Teodor Negoiţă (1947–2011) — polar-region explorer who, in 1995, became the first Romanian explorer who reached the North Pole; he ran the first permanent Romanian research-and-exploration station in Antarctica, the Law-Racoviță-Negoiță Station, which he established in 2006. Originally named Law-Racoviță Station, his name was added in 2011 in his honor after his death.
