= Steinn =

Steinn may refer to:

- Andri Steinn (born 1979), Icelandic film editor
- Guðmundur Steinn Gunnarsson (born 1982), Icelandic composer
- Hallar-Steinn, Icelandic poet active around the year 1200
- Snorri Steinn Gudjonsson (born 1981), Icelandic handball player
- Steinn O. Thompson (1893–1972), politician in Manitoba, Canada
- Steinn Steinarr (1908–1958), Icelandic poet
- Kári Steinn Karlsson (born 1986), Icelandic long-distance runner
- Hjörvar Steinn Grétarsson (born 1993), Icelandic chess player

== See also ==
- Völu-Steinn, Icelandic skald of the mid-10th century
- Stein (disambiguation)
- Steina
- Steine (disambiguation)
- Steinnes
