= Florica Topârceanu =

Romanian biologist

- Born: June 14, 1954; Bucharest, Romanian People's Republic
- Education: University of Bucharest
- Scientific career
- Fields: Biology, Antarctic aquatic viruses
- Workplaces: "Ștefan S. Nicolau" Institute of Virology of the Romanian Academy
- Thesis: (1999)

Florica Topârceanu (born June 14, 1954) is an Antarctic researcher, best known for her work was on Antarctic aquatic viruses and the development of the Antarctic scientific community in Romania. She was the first Romanian woman biologist to study life in Antarctica and the first Romanian woman expert to the Antarctic Treaty.

== Early life and education ==
Florica Topârceanu was born on June 14, 1954, in Bucharest, Romania. She attended the University of Bucharest and studied biology with a specialisation in biochemistry from 1973 to 1977, and continued to obtain an MSc in 1978. During the next twenty years she worked in the Ștefan S. Nicolau Institute of Virology at the Romanian Academy in the departments of Viral Molecular Biology (1983–1990), Viral Immunochemistry (1990–1993), Virosis Ethiopatology (1994–1999), Viral Genetic Engineering (2000–2004), National Center of Reference for Influenza and Respiratory Viroses (1992–2004), Anti-viral Therapy (2004–2009). She was awarded a PhD in biochemistry by the University of Bucharest in 1999.

== Career and impact ==
Topârceanu's research interests are Antarctic aquatic viruses and her research expertise focuses on the life sciences, people and the biosphere. She is a founding member and the Scientific Secretary of the National Commission on Antarctic Research (NCAR) of Romania, as well as being the head of the Extreme Life Laboratory at the Virology Institute 'Ștefan Nicolau' of the Romanian Academy. Topârceanu is one of the initiators of an Arctic and Antarctic Research Department within the Romanian Institute for Biological Sciences (INCDSB).

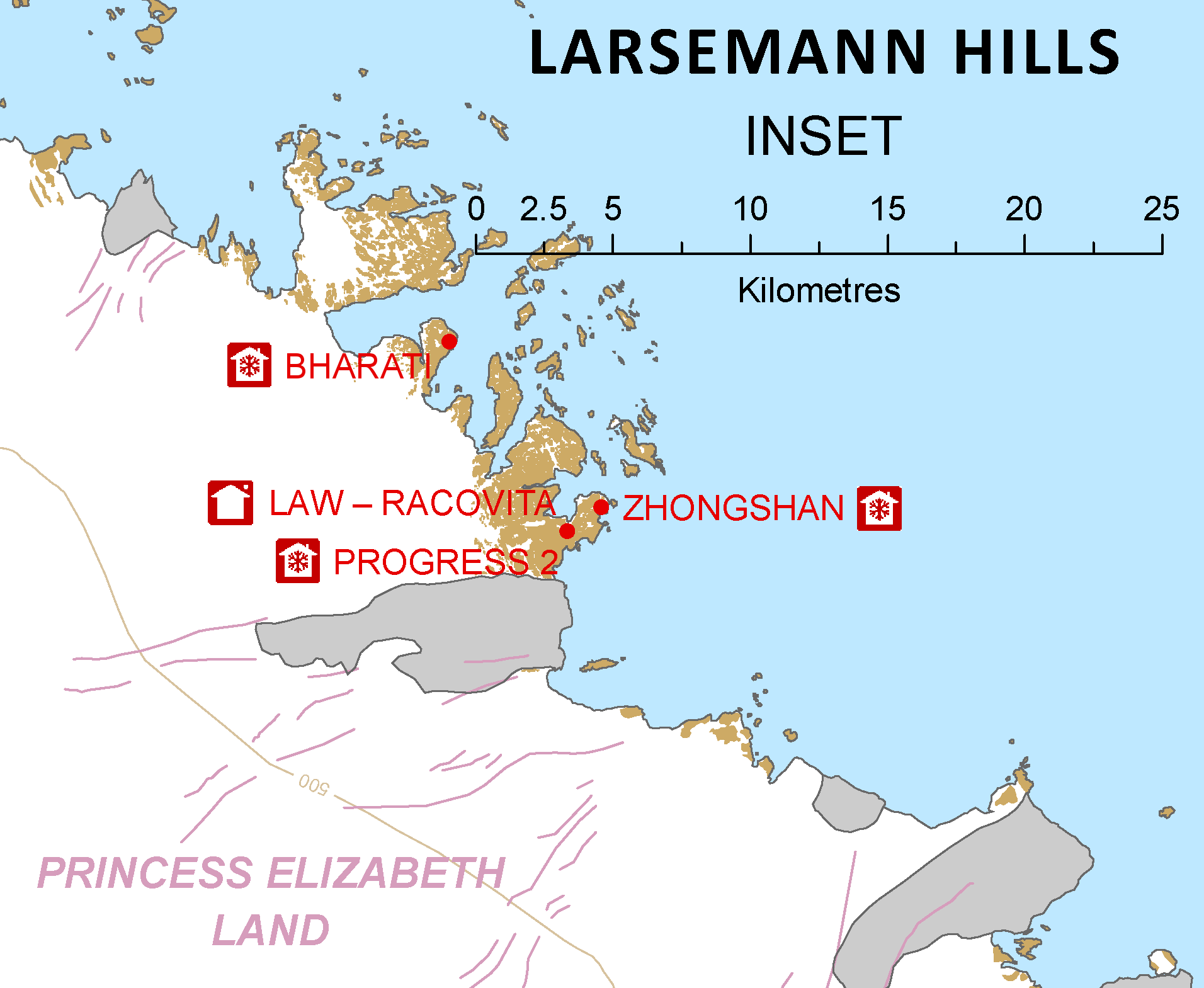
Map showing the Law-Racoviță Station on Antarctica's Larsemann Hills

Topârceanu was the primary biological scientist to the First Romanian National Antarctica Expedition (ENROCA 1) in the Austral summer of 2005–2006 and was present at the inauguration of the Law-Racoviță Station (Australia–Romania) in the Larsemann Hills of East Antarctica, on February 20, 2006. The three members of the expedition—Teodor Negoiță, Topârceanu, and Elena Bocanciu—arrived in Antarctica on January 13, 2006 and stayed there for 44 days. Preparations for the expedition had been done in the harsh wintry climate of the Bucegi Mountains. Topârceanu was, after Emil Racoviță (a member of the Belgica Antarctic Expedition in 1897), the first Romanian biologist, as well as the first Romanian woman biologist to study life in Antarctica and the first Romanian woman expert to the Antarctic Treaty.

She was the coordinator of CEEX Module 3: Structuring of an integrated international cooperation research on biodiversity in polar ecosystems, the response to environmental changes, and applications, and other projects within the International Polar Year (IPY). She is the current director of the Romanian Antarctic project on biomedical research under extreme life conditions (Promotion Within a European and International Partnership of Biomedical Research under Extreme Life Conditions), an international collaboration between universities from Austria, Australia, Belgium, Bulgaria, China, Israel, Sweden, and the United States. Topârceanu collaborated on the IPY Project 1267 "Evolution of pedobiological processes in Polar Zones", and achieved the project "Adaptation responses of Romanian explorers to the extreme Antarctic environment as compared with the Arctic one" in cooperation with Australia, as proposed within IPY Action 181 "Taking the Antarctic – Arctic Polar Pulse". She has visited and worked at the Chinese Antarctic station of "Zhong Shan", the Russian station of "Progress II" and the Australian "Davis" station.

She holds a central role in the National Commission for Antarctic Research (NCAR) of the Romanian Academy of Bucharest (Romania) and is the current Scientific Secretary of the Executive Bureau of NCAR. She is the current Chief Officer and Romanian contact point, of the NCAR Human Biology and Medicine (EGHBM) expert group, a joint programme with SCAR and SCAR-COMNAP and is the main Romanian delegate to SCAR. Topârceanu has also served as an APECS Mentor. Topârceanu was the delegate at the Antarctic Treaty Consultative Meeting (ATCM) in 2005, 2006, and 2013 and is the Romanian representative to ATCM for scientific and operational. She was also the Romanian invited delegate of NCAR to the Council of Managers of National Antarctic Programmes (COMNAP) AGM 2015.

Topârceanu was instrumental to Romania being accepted as an Associated Member State to SCAR in 2008 by consulting on documents related to NCAR establishment (Statute, Rules of Procedures, Organization), contributing to the Romanian Antarctic Science Strategic Plan (2013–2020) to develop the National Antarctic Program under the Laws of Antarctic Treaty and Madrid Protocol, and her role in Antarctic theme projects. Her work has provided insight into human adaptations to extreme conditions and continues to promote the domestic and international cooperation in polar research fields in order to develop the Romanian Antarctic community. Topârceanu has spoken on "Conducting scientific research in the field in Antarctica in accordance with the Environmental Code of Conduct issued by SCAR", at the Environment and Climate Change Ministry in 2013.

Topârceanu has been active in Antarctic outreach including being interviewed for Romanian national radio as well as photographic exhibitions.

== Awards and honors ==
Topârceanu's invention "Considerations on possible cerulloplasmin functions in the infection with influenza and para-influenza viruses" won second prize. She received a plate of honour – "You offered us a life lesson", from the broadcast team of the national "Romantica" TV Station ("9409 – Romantica") on September 20, 2008.
