= Dålk Glacier =

Glacier in Antarctica

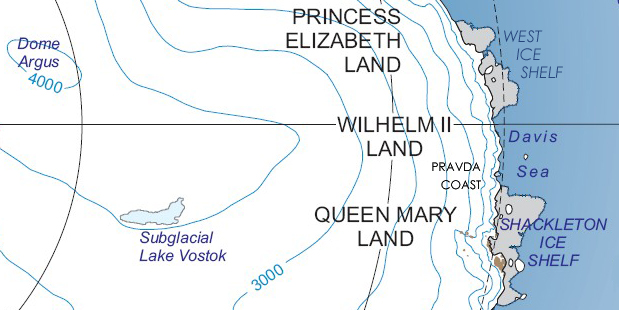
- Location of Princess Elizabeth Land

- Location within Antarctica
- Location: Princess Elizabeth Land
- Coordinates: 69°26′S 76°27′E
- Length: 8 nmi (15 km; 9 mi)
- Thickness: unknown
- Terminus: Prydz Bay
- Status: unknown

Dålk Glacier (69°26′S 76°27′E) is a glacier, 8 nautical miles (15 km) long, draining into the southeast part of Prydz Bay between the Larsemann Hills and Steinnes. It was mapped by Norwegian cartographers from air photos taken by the Lars Christensen Expedition (1936–37), and named by John H. Roscoe in his 1952 study of features in the area as identified in air photos taken by U.S. Navy Operation Highjump (1946–47). It was named after Dålk Island lying at the terminus of the glacier.

== See also ==
- List of glaciers in the Antarctic
- Glaciology
