= Florica (given name) =

Florica is a common Romanian feminine given name. Notable people with the name include:

- Florica Bagdasar (1901–1978), Romanian neuropsychiatrist, first woman minister in Romania at the Ministry of Health
- Florica Bucur (born 1959), Romanian rower
- Florica Grecescu (born 1932), Romanian middle-distance runner
- Florica Lavric (1962–2014), Romanian rower
- Florica Leonida (born 1987), Romanian artistic gymnast
- Florica Musicescu (1887–1969), Romanian pianist and musical pedagogue
- Florica Petcu-Dospinescu (born 1951), Romanian rower
- Florica Prevenda (born 1959), Romanian artist
- Florica Silaghi (born 1957), Romanian rower
- Florica Topârceanu (born 1954), Romanian biologist and Antarctic researcher
- Florica Vulpeș (born 1982), Romanian sprint canoer

Less common is the masculine form of the name, Florică; this given name may refer to:

- Florică Murariu (1955–1989), Romanian rugby union player

== See also ==
- Florica (disambiguation)
