= Stamsund Church =

Church in Nordland, Norway

- Stamsund kirke
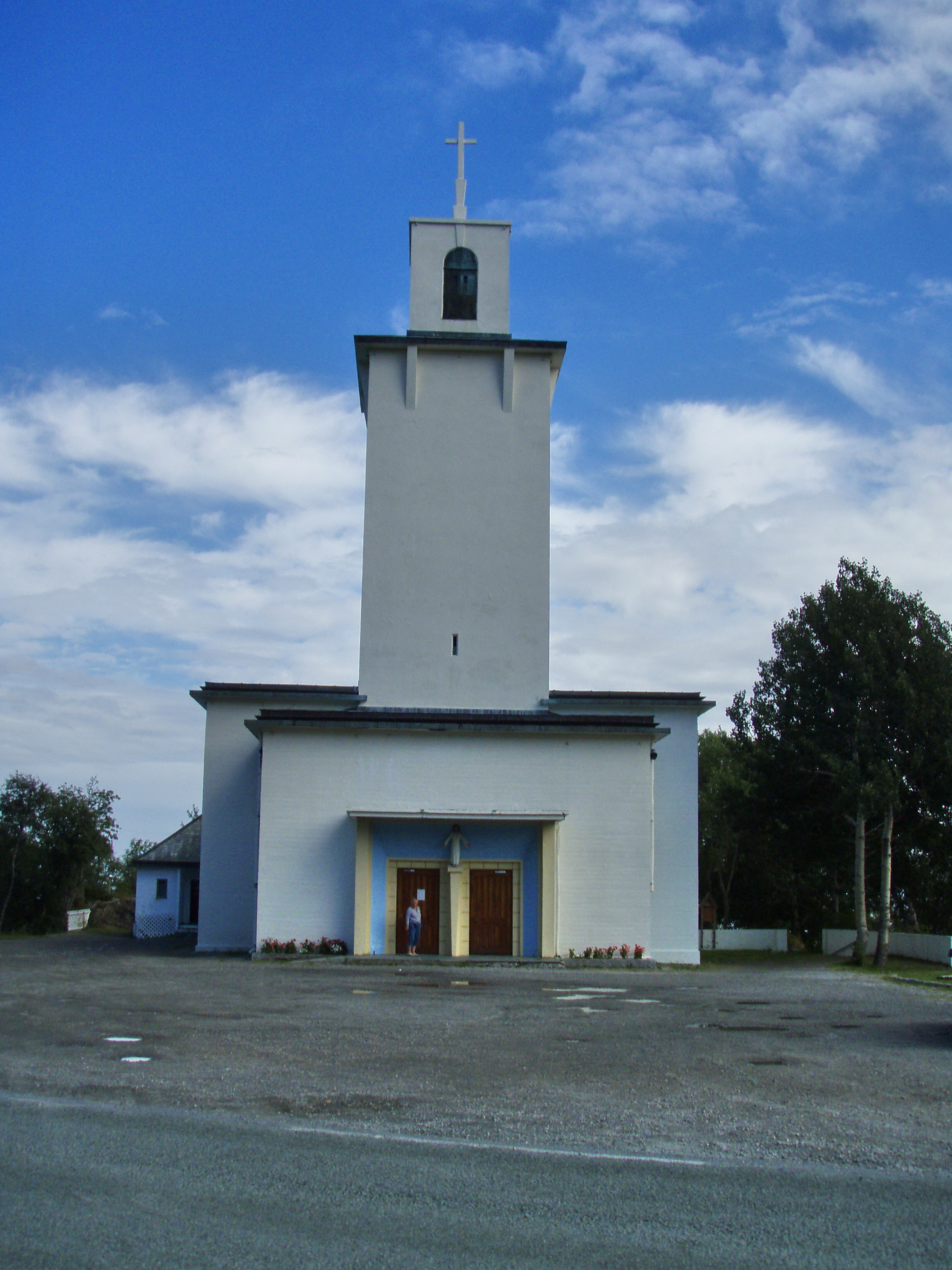
- View of the church
- Stamsund Church
- 68.14393968°N 13.83914172°E
- Location: Vestvågøy, Nordland
- Country: Norway
- Denomination: Church of Norway
- Churchmanship: Evangelical Lutheran

History
- Status: Parish church
- Founded: 1937
- Consecrated: 13 July 1937

Architecture
- Functional status: Active
- Architect: Sigmund Brænne
- Architectural type: Long church
- Completed: 1937 (89 years ago)

Specifications
- Capacity: 500
- Materials: Concrete

Administration
- Diocese: Sør-Hålogaland
- Deanery: Lofoten prosti
- Parish: Stamsund
- Norwegian Cultural Heritage Site
- Type: Church
- Status: Listed
- ID: 85546

Stamsund Church (Norwegian: Stamsund kirke) is a parish church of the Church of Norway in Vestvågøy Municipality in Nordland county, Norway. It is located in the village of Stamsund on the island of Vestvågøya. It is the church for the Stamsund parish which is part of the Lofoten prosti (deanery) in the Diocese of Sør-Hålogaland. The white, concrete church was built in a long church style in 1937 using plans drawn up by the architect Sigmund Brænne. The church seats about 500 people.

== History ==
The old Steine Chapel was built in the nearby village of Steine in 1853, but was heavily damaged during a storm on 28 January 1905. The chapel needed to be rebuilt and was no longer usable. During the discussion about the structure of the chapel there was a debate about where the new church would be built. After more than 30 years of debate and discussion, a church was built in Stamsund to replace the old Steine Chapel. The church was consecrated on 13 July 1937 by the Bishop Eivind Berggrav. The church was built with its own crematorium that was in operation until 2002. The church was originally part of the Buksnes parish, but in 1969 it became its own parish.

=== Priests ===
The following priests have served at Stamsund Church:

- 1937-1952: Halvdan Thun
- 1952-1965: Reidar Mørch
- 1965-1969: Rolv Beisvåg
- 1969-1976: Asbjørn Bjarne Reknes
- 1976-1977: Ivar Ruud
- 1977-1982: Knut Are Aston Eikrem
- 1982-1983: Trygve Knutsen
- 1983-2003: Harold Holtermann
- 2003-2009: Uffe Kronborg
- 2009-2010: Jan Sahl
- 2011-2015: Aud Meaas Sigurdsen
- since 2015: Gunnar Már Kristjánsson

== Media gallery ==
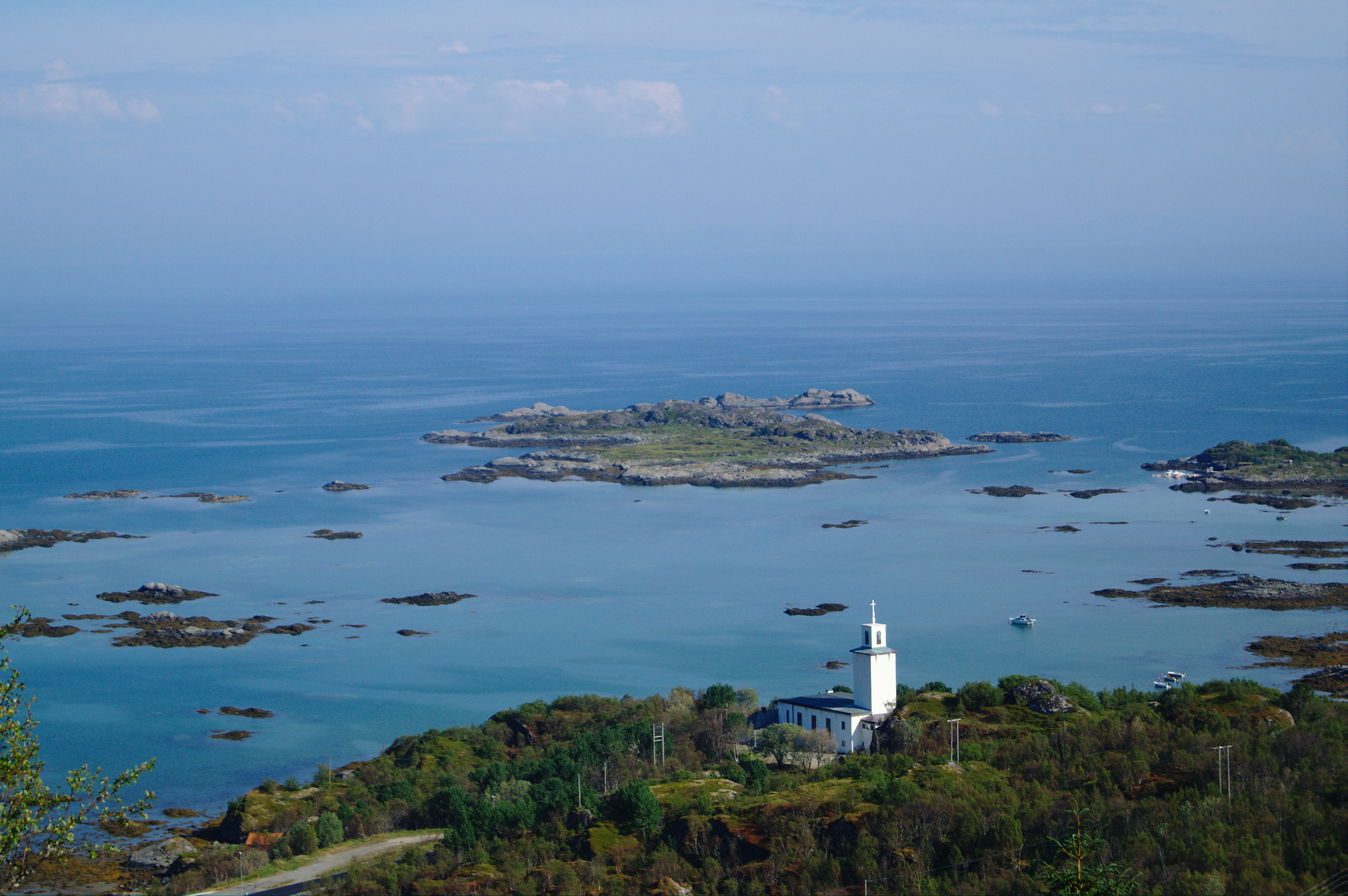

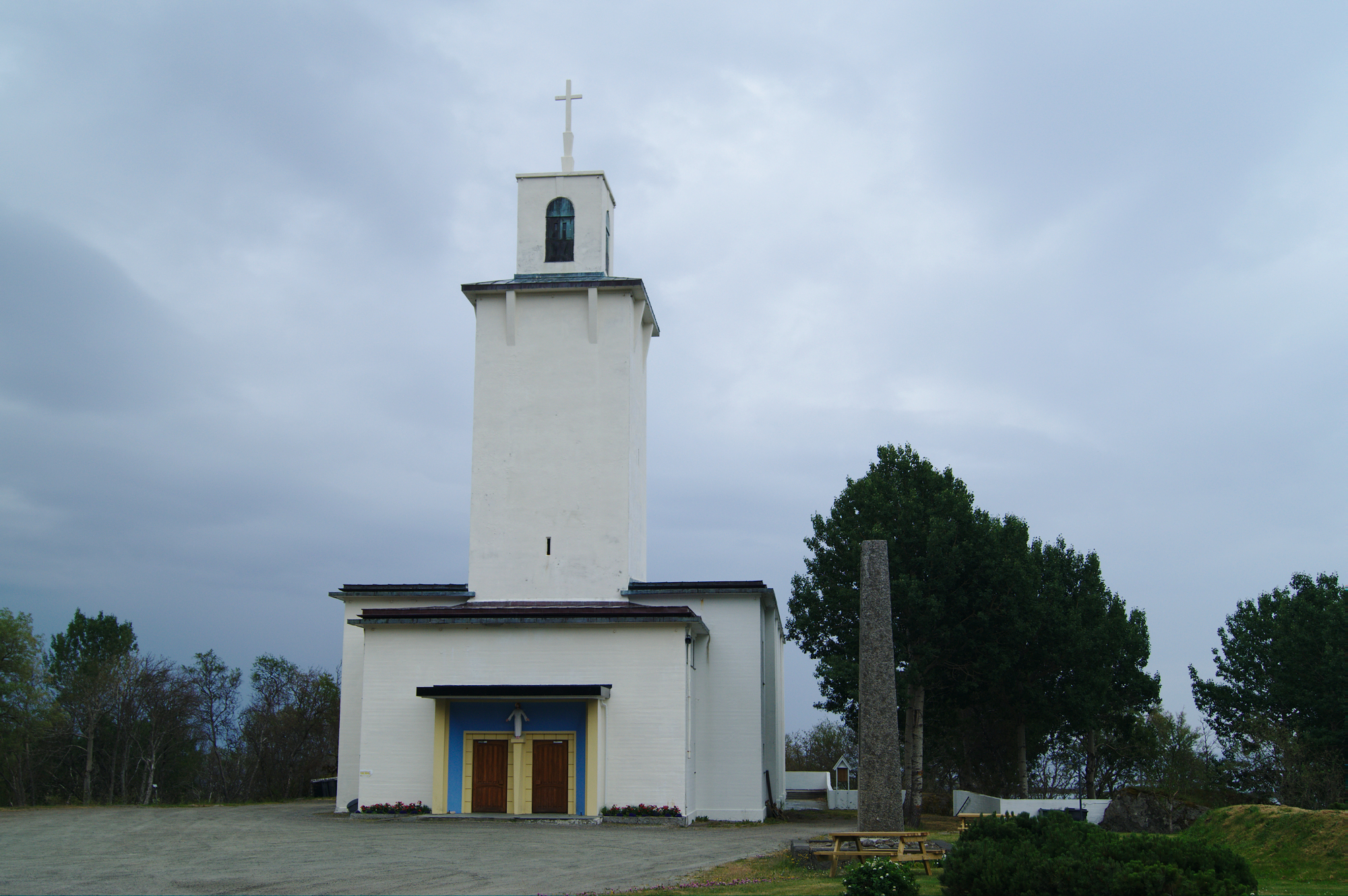

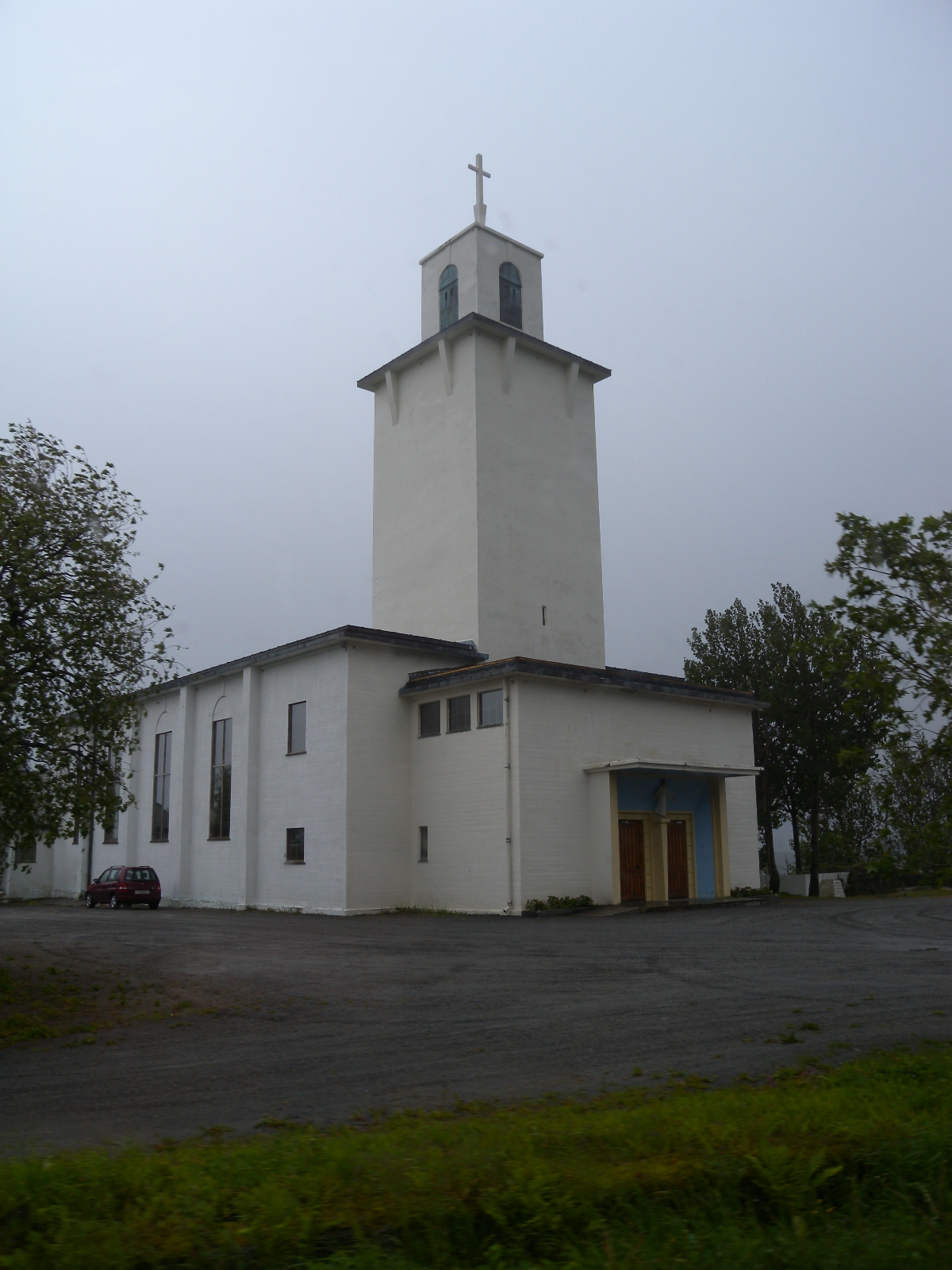

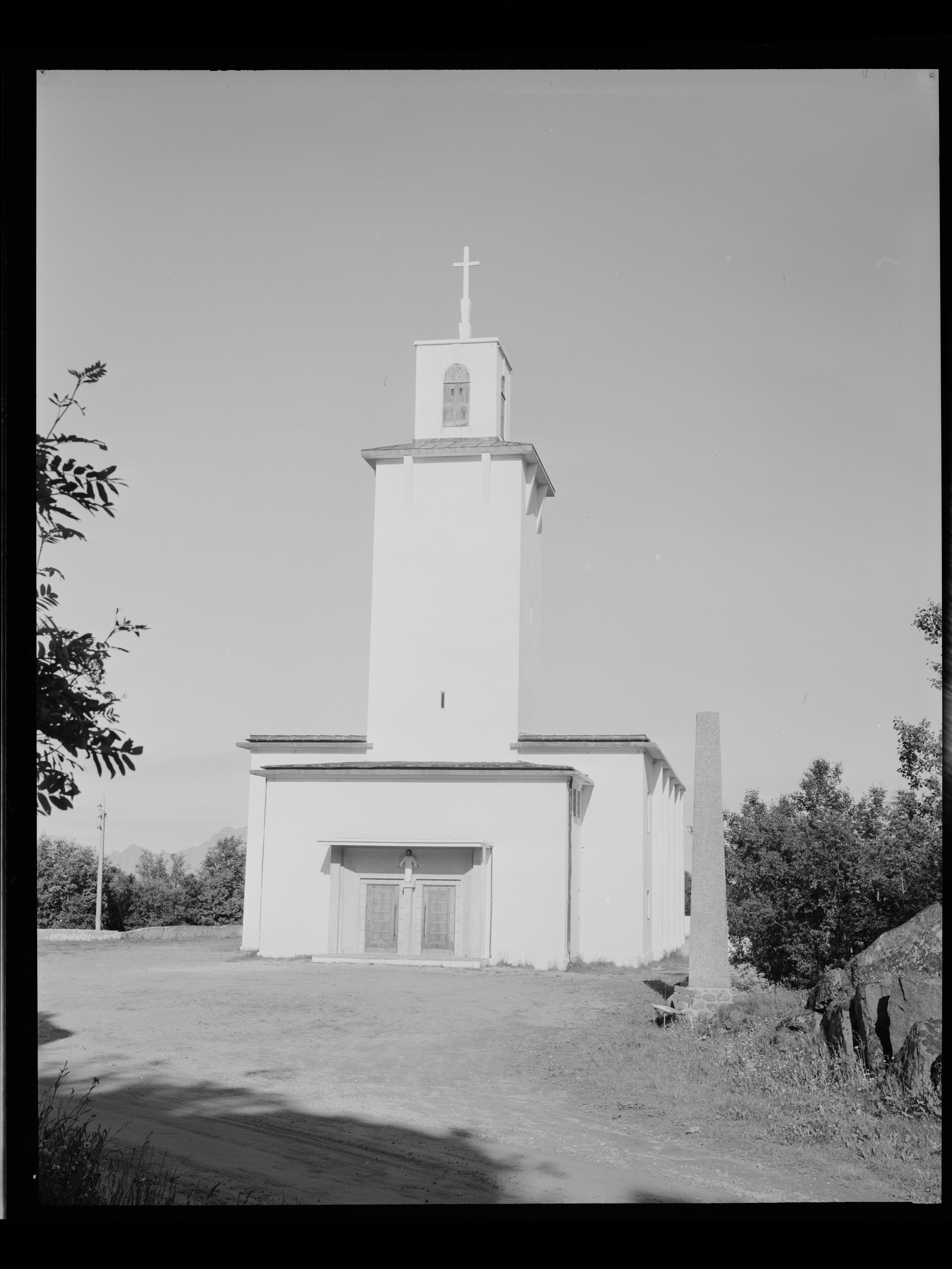

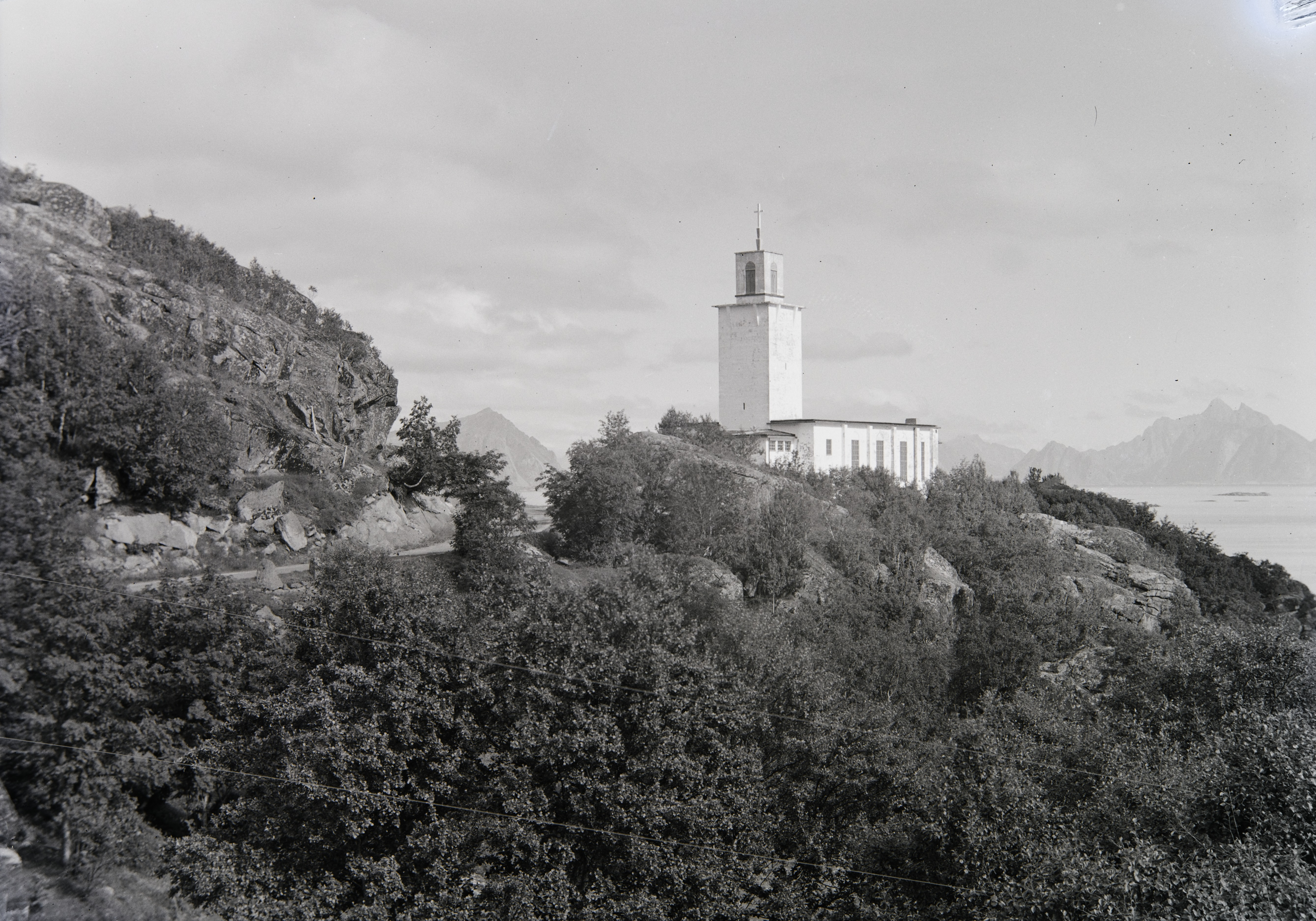

== See also ==
- List of churches in Sør-Hålogaland
