= Dålk Island =

Coastal island of Antarctica

- Location within Antarctica

Geography
- Location: Antarctica
- Coordinates: 69°23′S 76°30′E

Administration
- Administered under the Antarctic Treaty System

Demographics
- Population: Uninhabited

Dålk Island is a small coastal island lying at the terminus of Dålk Glacier, in the southeast part of Prydz Bay. It was mapped by Norwegian cartographers from aerial photographs taken by the Lars Christensen Expedition (1936–37) and named Dålkoy.

== See also ==
- List of antarctic and sub-antarctic islands
