= Florica (disambiguation) =

Florica is a commune in Buzău County, Romania.

Florica may also refer to:

== Places ==
- Florica, a village in Coșcalia, Căușeni district, Moldova
- Florica, a village in Roșiori, Brăila County, Romania
- Florica, a village in Ileana, Călărași County, Romania
- Florica, a village in Dracea, Teleorman County, Romania

== Other ==
- Florica (given name)
