= Sascut =

- Commune
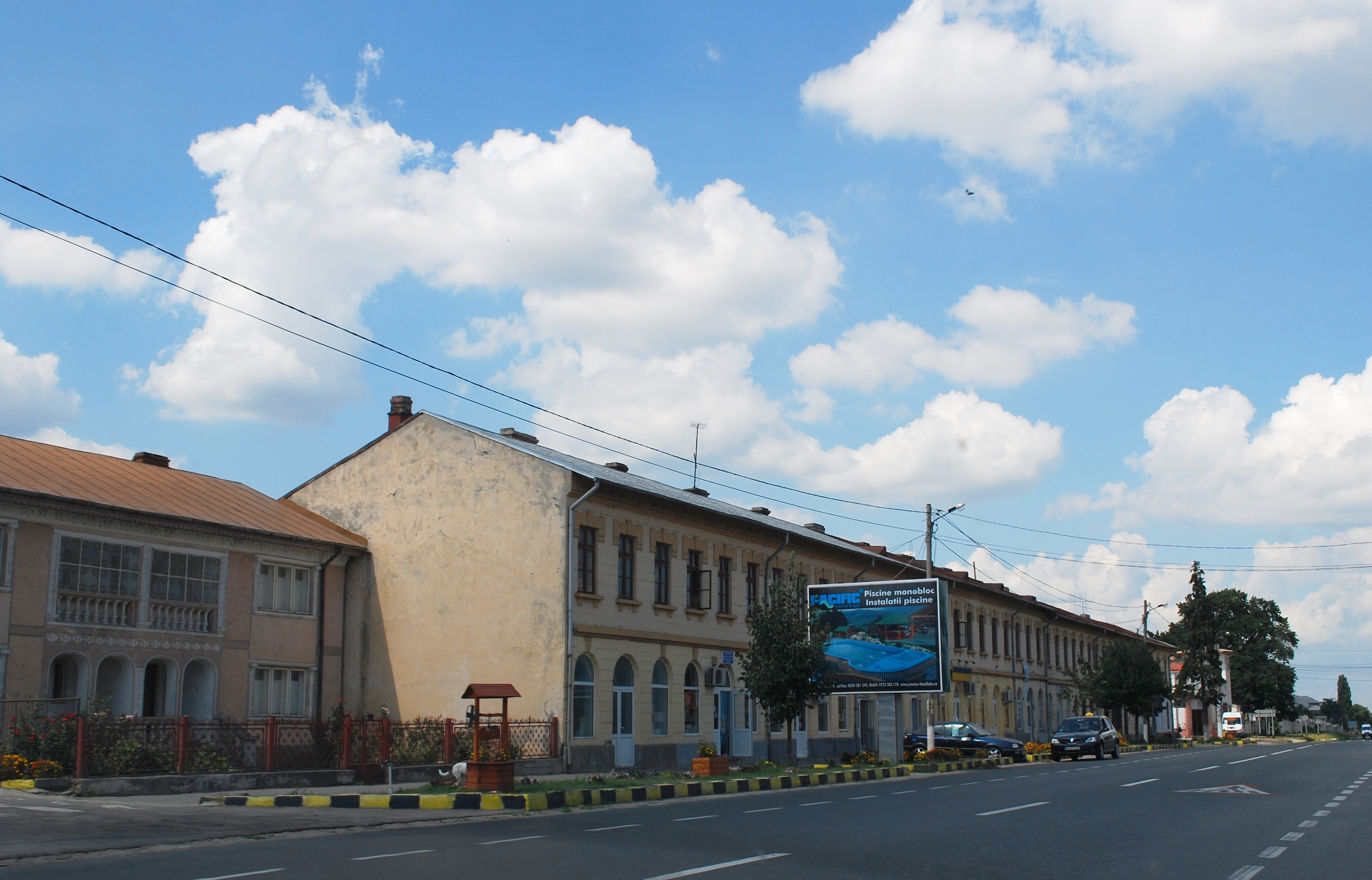
- Downtown Sascut

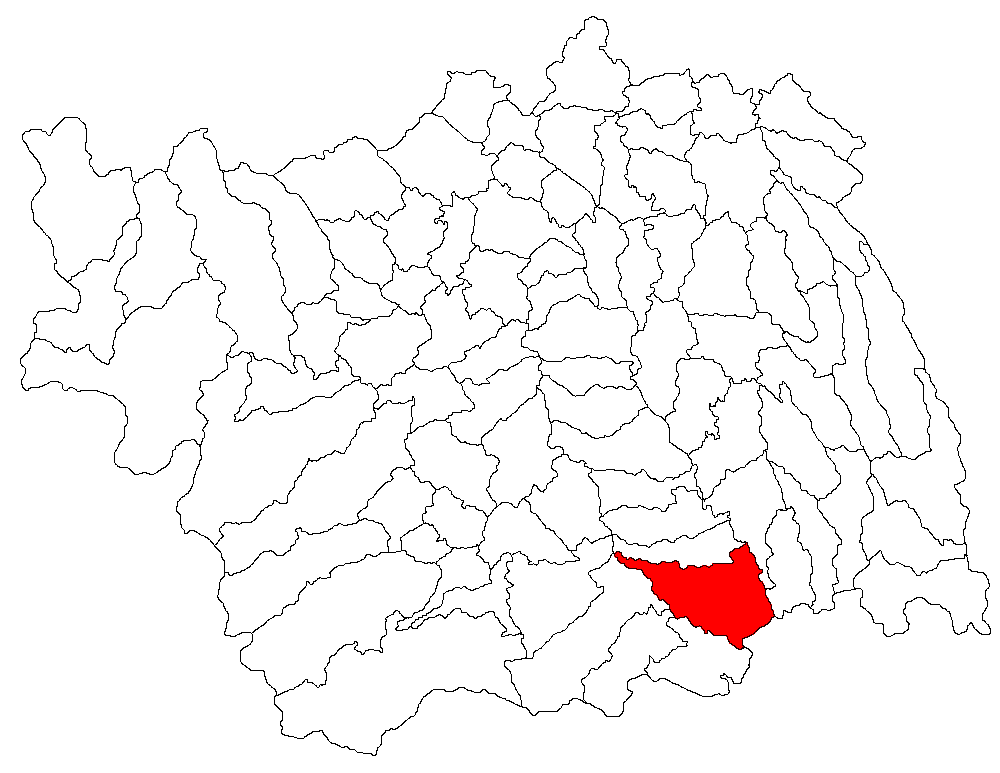
- Location in Bacău County

- Location in Romania
- Coordinates: 46°11′N 27°4′E
- Country: Romania
- County: Bacău

Government
  - Mayor (2024–2028): Ionel Apostol (PSD)
- Area: 107.84 km^{2} (41.64 sq mi)
- Elevation: 141 m (463 ft)
- Population (2021-12-01): 8,085
  - Density: 74.97/km^{2} (194.2/sq mi)
- Time zone: UTC+02:00 (EET)
  - Summer (DST): UTC+03:00 (EEST)
- Postal code: 607520
- Area code: +(40) 0234
- Vehicle reg.: BC
- Website: www.primaria-sascut.ro

Sascut is a commune in Bacău County, Western Moldavia, Romania. It is composed of seven villages: Berești, Conțești, Păncești, Sascut, Sascut-Sat, Schineni, and Valea Nacului.

== Natives ==
- Teodor Negoiță (1947–2011), polar explorer
- Valerian Stan (born 1955), military officer, publicist, and human rights activist
