= Wendy Law Suart =

Australian traveller and writer

Wendy Law Suart (26 August 1926 – 16 July 2012) was an Australian traveller and writer. She is best known for the 11,000-mile (18,000 km), three-year-long cycling trip round Australia that she undertook with her friend Shirley Duncan between 1946 – 1949. She wrote several books about her life.

== Early life ==
Suart was born in Hamilton, Victoria, to Arthur Law, an inspector of schools and later principal of Melbourne Teachers' College, and his wife, Lily (née Chapman). Suart was the youngest of their six children; their second child (and one of three sons) was Phillip Law, later a scientist and Antarctic explorer. Suart attended University High School, Melbourne, where one of her friends was Shirley Duncan; the pair had dreams of travelling the world. In her youth Suart had piano lessons from jazz pianist Graeme Bell. After leaving school she spent some time working as a secretary for a Melbourne radio station, Radio 3KZ. On the day the war ended, Suart quit her job and started to prepare to travel.

== Cycling trip ==
At the age of 19, Suart began her 11,000-mile (18,000 km) bicycle trip around Australia together with her 21-year-old friend from school, Shirley Duncan. The pair had originally planned to bicycle around Europe, but were dissuaded from doing so due to the dreadful post-war conditions there. Instead, they opted for what they thought would be a six-month trip around Australia. They prepared themselves by cycling round Victoria, to Adelaide and around Tasmania. They set off on their single-speed Malvern Stars (they received sponsorship from the company) in 1946. It took the pair a year to reach Queensland, and they then went on to Darwin and then south to Adelaide. They then crossed the Nullarbor Plain, a 600-mile (970 km) wide semi-arid, treeless plain, becoming the first women to cycle across it.

The pair soon gained publicity, becoming known as "the girl cyclists", and were featured in several Movietone News films. Suart and Duncan slept either out in the open in sleeping bags, or in lodgings they were offered by friendly locals. They did not have to pay for food for the first two and a half years of their trip. They washed their clothes in creeks and dried them on a washing line strung between the two bicycles as they cycled along. They took a variety of jobs to finance their trip, including canning fruit in a factory, selling sandwiches from their bikes during the wet season, helping on a cattle station and being mannequins at a large city store. They finally returned to Melbourne in April 1949, where they were greeted by the press and champion cyclist Hubert Opperman and veteran cyclist Ernie Old.

Duncan published her account of the journey, Two Wheels to Adventure: Through Australia by Bicycle in 1957, and 51 years later Suart published hers, With Bags and Swags: Around Australia in the Forties. Suart had kept a diary throughout the trip, which she used as the main source for her book.

== Later life ==
Following her bicycle adventure, in June 1949 Suart went to visit her brother Peter, who worked for Shell Oil at Seria in Brunei. She liked Borneo immensely, and so found a job in Jesselton (now Kota Kinabalu) in British North Borneo (now the Malaysian state of Sabah). There she met Brian Suart, an Englishman who worked for Cable and Wireless as an engineer. They married in Jesselton on 21 January 1951. The couple left Borneo in 1953, and Brian's work took them around the world. They had six children, and after Brian's retirement in 1974, settled in Surrey and then Hampshire in the UK. Brian died in 1990, and Suart continued to travel the world after his death, visiting Antarctica, Bhutan, Tierra del Fuego, Bulgaria, the Amazon, Yangtze and Irrawaddy rivers, China, Borneo, Hong Kong and Russia among others.

In 2007 Suart featured on the BBC Radio 4 travel programme Excess Baggage, discussing her bicycle ride.

A keen pianist, Suart played regularly at an antiques warehouse in Hampshire. She released a CD, I've Heard that Song Before, which featured 46 tunes from the 1920s, '30s and '40s. Suart died on 16 July 2012 at her home in Hampshire.

== Bibliography ==
- 1993 The Lingering Eye: Recollections of North Borneo Durham: The Pentland Press. ISBN 1 85821 103 4
- 2001 Golden Morning: An Australian Childhood
- 2008 With Bags and Swags: Around Australia in the Forties (about her bicycling trip around Australia)
- 2011 Colonial Swansong: A Mem's Memoirs (following on from the Lingering Eye, covering Suart's time in Hong Kong, Bahrain, Jamaica and back to Hong Kong for ten years)
