= Valerian Stan =

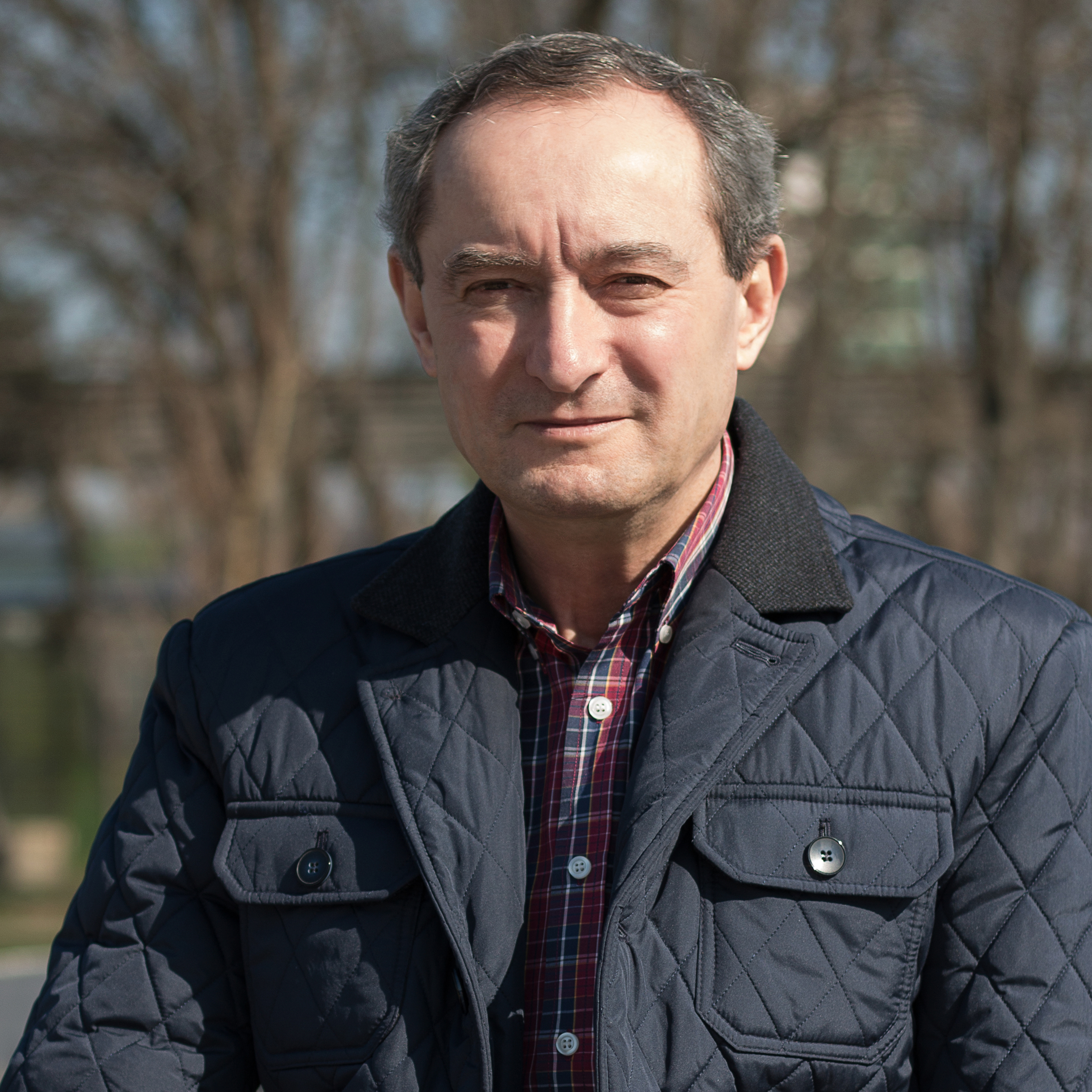
- Born: 1955 (age 70–71); Sascut, Bacău Region, Romanian People's Republic
- Education: Nicolae Bălcescu Land Forces Academy; University of Bucharest
- Occupations: legal consultant, human rights activist, publicist
- Website: www.valerianstan.ro

Valerian Stan (born 1955) is a Romanian publicist, civic and human rights activist, dignitary, lawyer, and military officer.

== Education and career ==
He was born in Sascut, Bacău County. In 1977, Stan graduated the Nicolae Bălcescu Military School of active infantry officers from Sibiu. At graduation he received the rank of lieutenant and was assigned to a military unit in Bucharest. For nearly eight years he served as platoon and companion commander. Subsequently, until the end of 1989, he held administrative positions in the fields of logistics and labor protection, including within military construction units in the "national economy". Between 1982 and 1987, he attended the courses of the Faculty of Law at the University of Bucharest.

After the Romanian Revolution of December 1989, he was a publicist, one of the leaders of the Civic Alliance, and he worked in human rights and think-tank organizations (APADOR-CH, CRJ, IPP, etc.). Between December 1996 and August 1997, he was state secretary, chief of Government's Control Department (GCD), within the government of Victor Ciorbea. The investigations he coordinated in this position uncovered several irregularities of some high officials affiliated to the governmental coalition (the questionable selling of part of the navy's property, the Flota-Fleet dossier, "Petroklav"/Traian Băsescu and others, the occupancy or the illegal appropriation of several residences from the state's special locative fund, etc.) This fact finally led to Stan's dismissal from the position – a decision that later was considered as a mistake by Prime Minister Ciorbea and Minister Băsescu. In subsequent years, this measure had serious consequences in the fight against corruption in Romania.
