= Aurora Borealis (icebreaker) =

Proposed icebreaker

- rough sketch of ERI Aurora Borealis

History
- Name: Aurora Borealis
- Namesake: Aurora Borealis
- Operator: European Science Foundation
- Cost: 800 M€; <500 M€ (Aurora Slim)

General characteristics (initial concept)
- Type: Icebreaker
- Displacement: 65,000 tons
- Length: 199.85 m (655.7 ft)
- Beam: 49 m (161 ft) (moulded); 45 m (148 ft) (waterline)
- Draught: 13 m (43 ft)
- Ice class: Polar Class 1
- Installed power: Eight main generators, 94 MW
- Propulsion: Diesel-electric; three shafts (3 × 27 MW); Three fixed-pitch propellers; Six retractable transverse thrusters (4.5 MW each)
- Speed: 15.5 knots (28.7 km/h; 17.8 mph) (max); 12 knots (22 km/h; 14 mph) (cruising); 2–3 knots (3.7–5.6 km/h; 2.3–3.5 mph) in 2.5 m (8.2 ft) multi-year ice
- Endurance: 90 days
- Crew: Accommodations for 120 personnel (science and crew)
- Aviation facilities: 2 helipads, hangar for 3 helicopters

Aurora Borealis is a proposed European research icebreaker, comparable to the world's strongest icebreakers, planned jointly by a consortium of fifteen participant organizations and companies from ten European nations. If built, she would be the largest icebreaker ever built as well as the first icebreaker built to the highest IACS ice class, Polar Class 1.

The unique feature of the proposed vessel is its ability to perform scientific deep sea drilling in a sea ice covered ocean. The ship is proposed to have an operational lifetime of 35 to 40 years, with the main area of operations being the inner Arctic Ocean.

== History and background ==
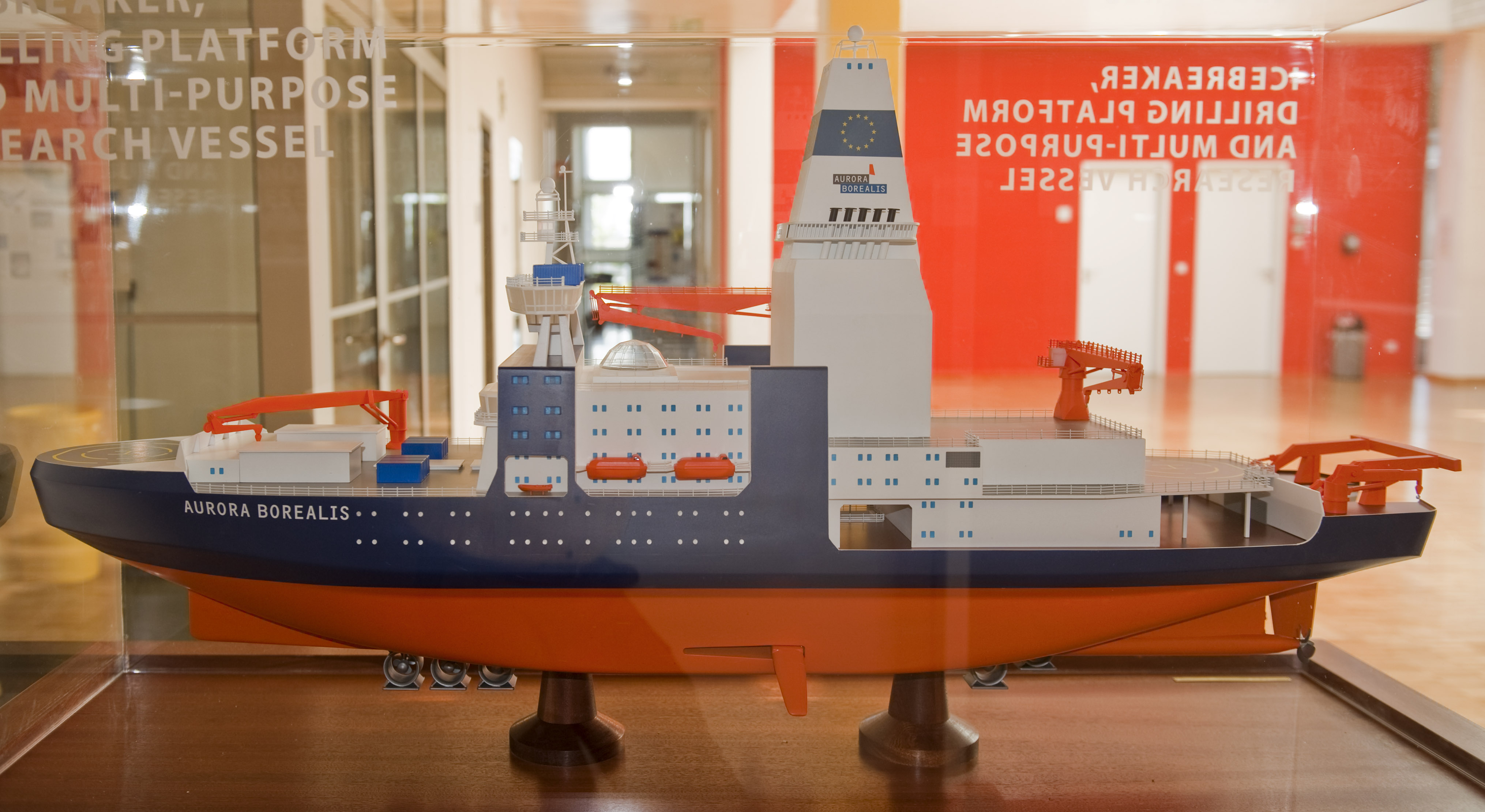
Model of the European research icebreaker Aurora Borealis.

The planning for the vessel started in 2002. The project is coordinated by the European Polar Board, an expert board of the European Science Foundation.

In March 2007 the BMBF (the German Federal Ministry for Science and Education) funded the preparations for Aurora Borealis, the Helmholtz Association center Alfred Wegener Institute for Polar and Marine Research hosted this project.

In 2010, the German Council of Science and Humanities stopped to support the planning which made the future of the 800-million-euro ship, designed by Schiffko (nowadays Wärtsilä Ship Design), uncertain. The project has been delayed, and a slightly smaller and cheaper (less than 500-million-euro) version, Aurora Slim, has been suggested by the Finnish engineering company Aker Arctic.

== Aurora Slim ==
The most prominent change from Aurora Borealis to Aurora Slim is that the insulated drilling rig is no longer present. The scientist have to rely on a mobile system and shallower boreholes of a few hundred metres instead of more than 1,000 metres (3,300 ft). She will also have only a single moon pool instead of two as in the original concept.

Like the original concept, the vessel is designed to break level ice up to 2.5 metres (8.2 ft) in thickness. However, the dynamical positioning system of the smaller vessel consists of three 15 MW azimuth thrusters and two 3.5 MW bow thrusters instead of three fixed propeller shafts with 27 MW propulsion motors and six 4.5 MW retractable transverse thrusters. The number and output of generating sets has also been reduced.

== Participants ==
The participants in the Aurora Borealis project are listed in the following table.

Participant		Country of origin
European Science Foundation	ESF	France
Alfred Wegener Institute for Polar und Marine Research in the Helmholtz Association	AWI	Germany
Consiglio Nazionale delle Ricerche	CNR	Italy
Programma Nazionale di Ricerche in Antartide	PNRA	Italy
Centre National de la Recherché Scientifique - Institut National des sciences L’Univers	CNRS-INSU	France
Arctic and Antarctic Research Institute	AARI	Russia
Institut Polaire Français Paul Emile Victor	IPEV	France
Merentutkimuslaitos (Finnish Institute of Marine Research)	MTL	Finland
Netherlands Organisation for Scientific Research	NWO	Netherlands
University of Bergen	UIB	Norway
Bundesministerium für Bildung und Forschung	BMBF	Germany
Fonds National de la Recherche Scientifique	FNRS	Belgium
Bulgarian Antarctic Institute	BAI	Bulgaria
Romanian Antarctic Foundation	FAR	Romania
Aker Arctic Technology Inc	AARC	Finland
