= Steine =

Steine may refer to:

- Steine, Vestland, a village in Kvam municipality, Vestland county, Norway
- Steine, Vesterålen, a part of the village of Bø in Bø Municipality in Nordland county, Norway
- Steine, Nordland, a village in Vestvågøy municipality, Nordland county, Norway
- Steine, Trøndelag, a village in Nærøysund municipality, Trøndelag county, Norway
- The Old Steine, a promenade in Brighton, Sussex, England, in the United Kingdom
