= Bazil Assan =

Romanian engineer, explorer and economist

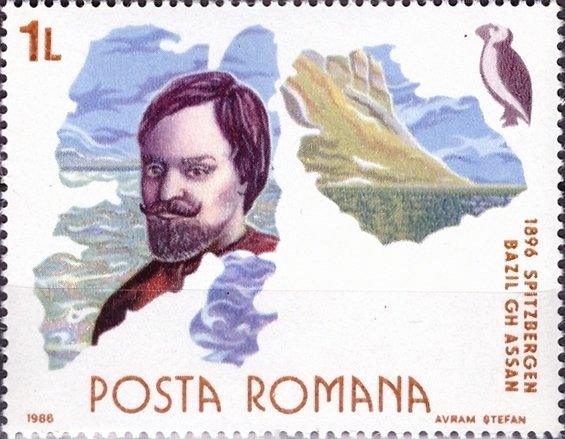
- Romanian stamp of 1986 representing Bazil Assan and his expedition to Svalbard
- Born: Bazil George Assan; 1 August 1860; Bucharest, United Principalities
- Died: 16 June 1918 (aged 57); Montreux, Switzerland
- Occupations: Engineer, explorer, economist
- Known for: Being the first Romanian to travel to the Arctic and around the world
- Parent(s): George Assan and Alexandrina Assan

Bazil George Assan (1 August 1860 – 16 June 1918) was a Romanian engineer, explorer and economist. Belonging to a wealthy family in Bucharest, Assan was an important figure in the industrialization of the Kingdom of Romania. He studied engineering, commerce and economics, which impulsed him to discover the globe. In 1896, he became the first Romanian to travel to the Arctic, and between 1897 and 1898, he became the first Romanian to travel around the world. His travels were later presented to King Carol I of Romania. Assan died on 16 June 1918 in Montreux, Switzerland.

== Biography ==
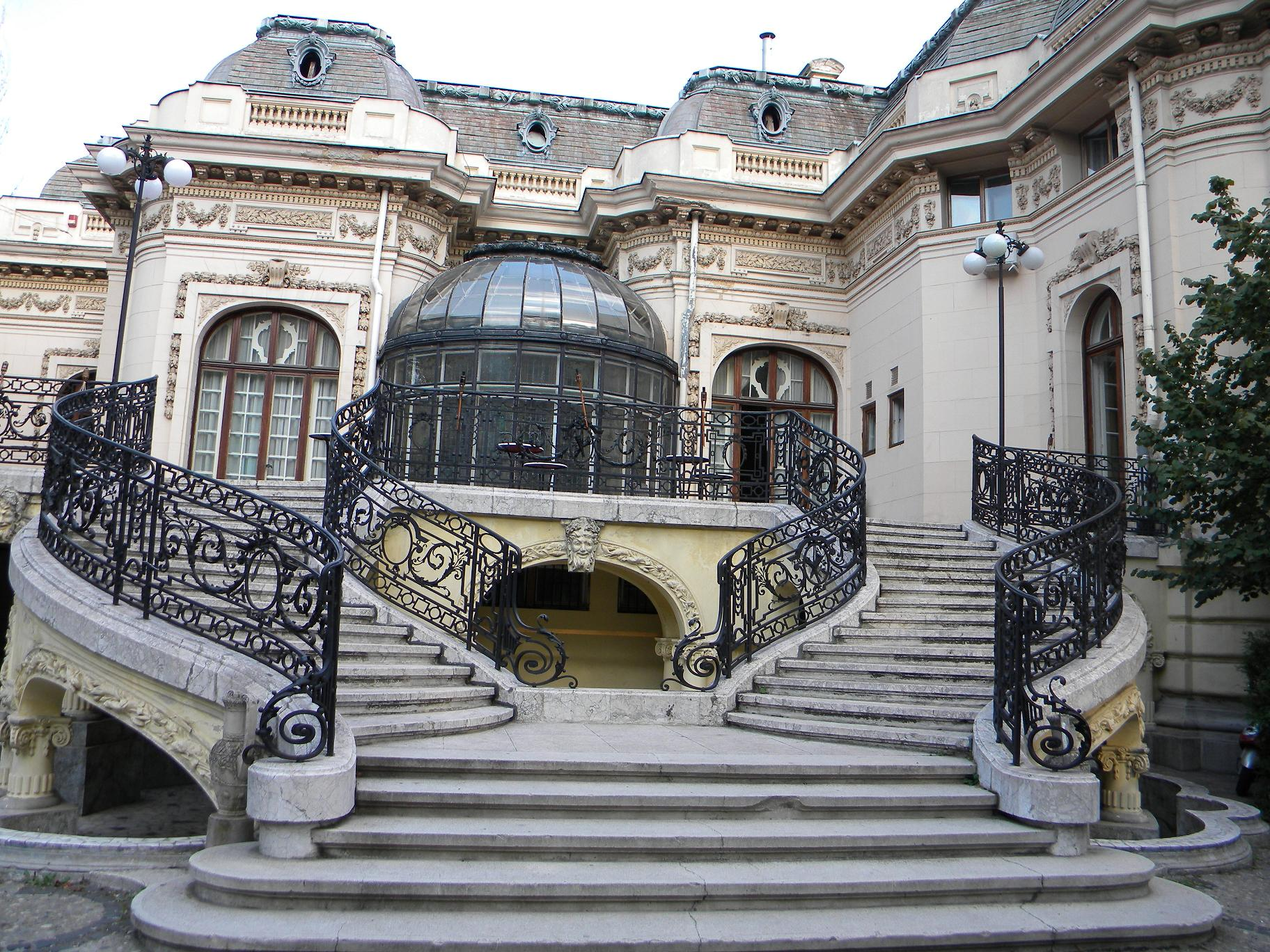
The Assan House in Bucharest, now a monument

Assan was born on 1 August 1860 in Bucharest to a rich family. His father, George Assan, a Romanian from Moldavia, settled in the city and built the first steam mill in Romanian history (known as the Assan Mill) on the shore of the Colentina Lake in 1853. His mother was Alexandrina Assan, who took charge of the company of the family since her spouse's death in 1866 until her son Assan replaced her in 1884. Gheorghe G. Assan, his brother who was born in 1862, studied commerce in Antwerp, Belgium, and held various positions in commercial and other institutions.

Assan studied engineering in Liège, Belgium, and economics in Montreux, Switzerland. In 1884, he returned to Bucharest to work at his father's company with his brother. These two modernized the company and built two factories, one for soap and the other for paint and varnish. Assan was one of the persons who helped the Kingdom of Romania industrialize at more or less the same rate as other European countries. He also designed a canal between Cernavodă and Constanța (later the Danube–Black Sea Canal), publishing an article in 1899 about it.

Assan, together with the aviation and automobile enthusiast George Valentin Bibescu and the baron Barbu Bellu, was the first person to bring an automobile to Romania. The first two requested one from the brand FN Herstal. Since Bibescu did not have time to register it, Assan became in 1900 the first person to receive a plate, 1B. However, Bibescu wanted to be the first one, so in 1901, the Capital Prefecture gave him the plate 0B, which would technically make him the owner of the first plate in Romania.

Not much is known about Assan's family. He married a Romani woman and had three daughters. Assan named them according to where he was when they were born. Thus, the first was called Athenaida after Athens, Consuella after Spain and Pacifica after the Pacific Ocean.

In 1904, Assan built a 41 metres (135 feet) high grain silo, which became the tallest building in Bucharest at the time. He also built the first edible corn oil factory in the country. Between 1906 and 1914, he built a neoclassical house in Bucharest known as the Assan House. He died on 16 June 1918 in Montreux.

== Expeditions ==
Assan, stimulated by his knowledge of economics, commerce and industry, was greatly interested in discovering the world. Therefore, in the summer of 1896, he embarked on the Norwegian ship Erling Jarl and, along with other scientists of various nationalities, traveled to the Arctic. Assan and the scientists studied the geological structure and natural resources of the archipelago of Svalbard. Thus, he became the first Romanian to travel to the Arctic.

Afterwards, between 1897 and 1898, departing from Constanța, he passed through Constantinople, Alexandria, Ceylon, Singapore, Hong Kong, Shanghai, Nagasaki, Tokyo, Yokohama, San Francisco, New York and London, establishing several trade agreements and becoming the first Romanian to travel around the world. His expeditions were published in the Royal Society of Geography of Romania, of which he was a member. After returning, he presented his conference Călătorie în regiunile polare nordice ("Journey in the northern Polar regions") to King Carol I and Prince Ferdinand I, and days later to the Queen Elisabeth of Wied. In 1899, he presented to the public Călătoria împrejurul Pământului ("Journey around the Earth"), his second conference. Between December 1897 and the middle of 1898, Assan made another trip, this time with more economic and cultural intentions.

== See also ==
- List of Romanian explorers
