= Stamsund =

Village in Vestvågøy Municipality, Norway

- Village
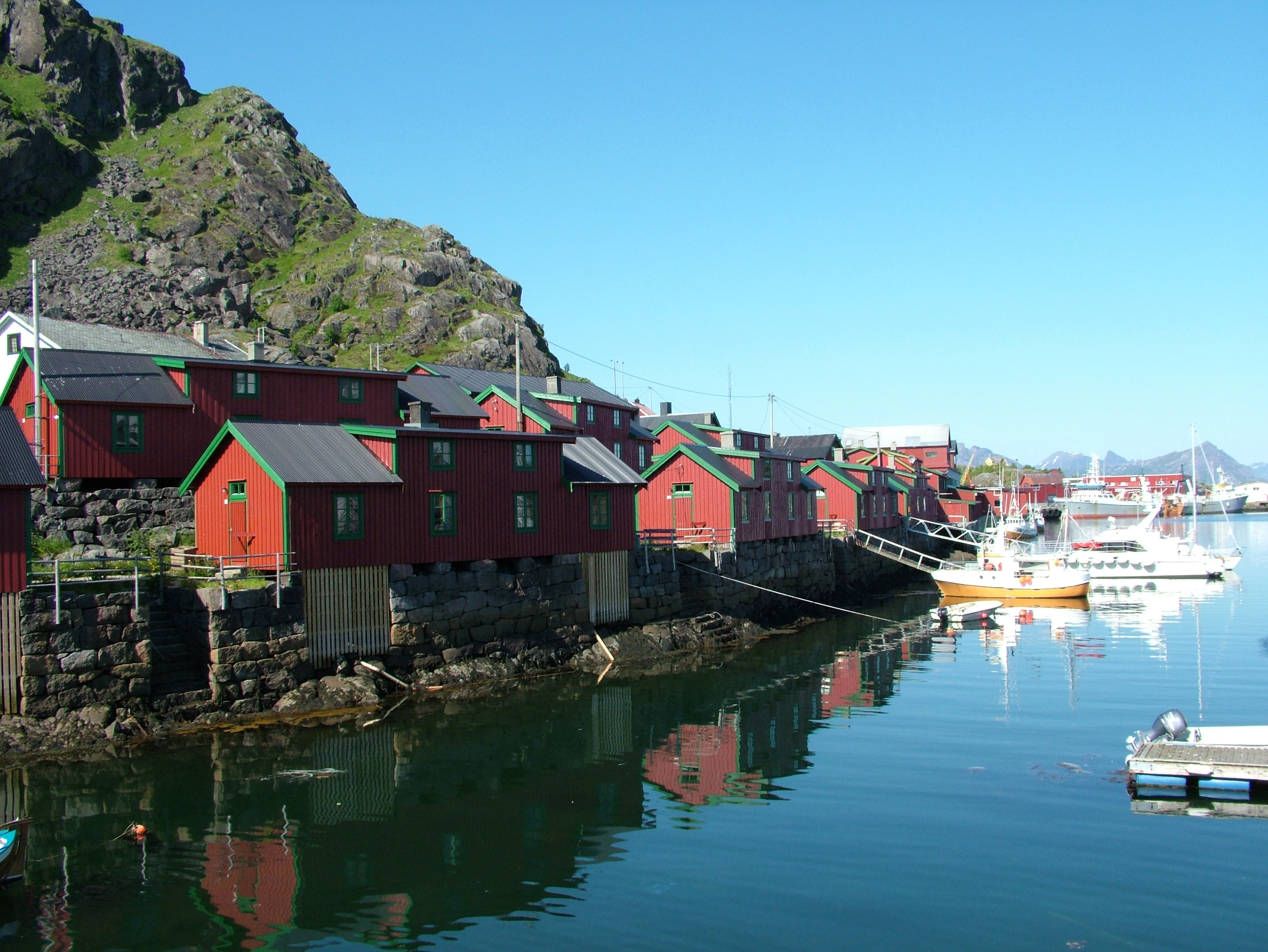
- View of the village
- Interactive map of Stamsund
- Location within Nordland Location within Norway
- Coordinates: 68.1301°N 13.8493°E
- Country: Norway
- Region: Northern Norway
- County: Nordland
- District: Lofoten
- Municipality: Vestvågøy Municipality

Area
  - Total: 1.03 km^{2} (0.40 sq mi)
- Elevation: 8 m (26 ft)

Population (2023)
  - Total: 1,104
  - Density: 1,072/km^{2} (2,780/sq mi)
- Time zone: UTC+01:00 (CET)
  - Summer (DST): UTC+02:00 (CEST)
- Post Code: 8340 Stamsund

Stamsund is a fishing village in Vestvågøy Municipality in Nordland county, Norway. It is located on the southern side of the island of Vestvågøya in the Lofoten archipelago, along the Vestfjorden. The village is located about 12 kilometres (7.5 mi) east of the town of Leknes. Historically, the village was the administrative centre of Hol Municipality from 1919 until 1963.

The 1.03-square-kilometre (250-acre) village has a population (2023) of 1,104 and a population density of 1,072 inhabitants per square kilometre (2,780/sq mi).

The Hurtigruten Coastal Express service stops twice a day at the Stamsund port, southbound from Svolvær and northbound from Bodø. Stamsund Church is located in this village and it serves the whole Stamsund region.

== Economy ==
Stamsund is an important fishing village and it is the largest base for Lofoten trawl fishing. Two of the most important companies in Stamsund are Norway Seafoods and J.M. Johansen A/S. Lofoten trawl fishing is the largest trawling industry in Northern Norway. J.M. Johansen is a traditional company which today works with fillet production.

== History ==
During World War II, the first successful raid on Nazi-held territory, Operation Claymore, was conducted here. After a successful operation they returned with some 228 German prisoners, 314 loyal Norwegian volunteers, a number of Quisling regime collaborators, and code books and wheels for the Enigma machine. Also, a telegram was sent to Adolf Hitler describing how ineffective the German forces were. Hitler's response was to send an SS unit to conduct future operations. The mountain above Stamsund still has the bunker complex and viewing port overlooking the village and the ocean to the west.

== Attractions ==
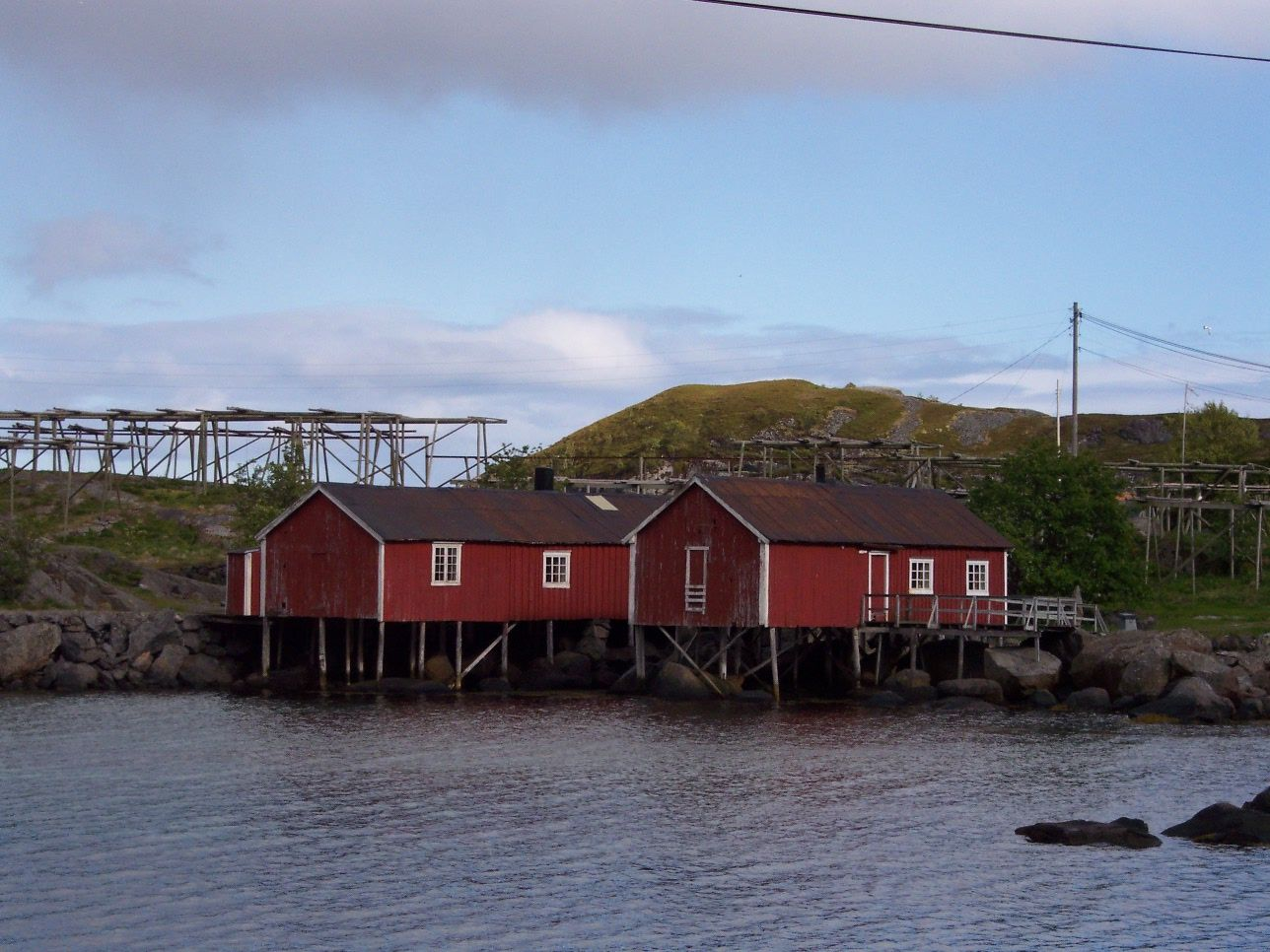
Traditional Norwegian rorbuer, or fishermen's shacks

Stamsund is a popular tourist destination, with the traditional fishermen's shacks, called rorbuer, being especially popular. There used to be a hotel in Stamsund, but as of 2009, it is no longer in service. There are, however, several options for tourists, such as Ytterviks Rorbuer.

There is a ski resort in Stamsund, which is usually open between January and March, although it opens earlier if weather conditions allow it. As Stamsund is surrounded by mountains, hiking is also very popular. In the area surrounding Stamsund, there are also several lakes in which one can fish. Sea fishing is also a popular choice, and boats may be hired. The midnight sun during the summer months and the northern light during the winter months attract a lot of tourists.

=== Theatre ===
Stamsund has a rich cultural life with two free theatre groups, Nordland puppet theatre, and many artists, such as Scott Thoe and Ulf M. Also, Stamsund plays host to the annual Stamsund International Theater Festival, where performers and enthusiasts gather every spring to enjoy a week of festivities. Founded in 2001, the festival aims to contribute to the international exchange of performing arts. The festival has grown into a relatively large institution, and attracts visitors from all over the world.
