= Steinnes =

Steinnes (69°22′S 76°34′E) is a rock point on the southeast shore of Prydz Bay, about 4 nautical miles (7 km) east-northeast of Larsemann Hills. First mapped from air photographs by the Lars Christensen Expedition (1936) and named Steinnes (stone point).
