= Steine, Nordland =

Village in Vestvågøy Municipality, Norway

Steine
- Village
- Interactive map of Steine
- Location within Nordland Location within Norway
- Coordinates: 68.11831°N 13.78741°E
- Country: Norway
- Region: Northern Norway
- County: Nordland
- District: Lofoten
- Municipality: Vestvågøy Municipality
- Elevation: 3 m (9.8 ft)
- Time zone: UTC+01:00 (CET)
  - Summer (DST): UTC+02:00 (CEST)
- Post Code: 8340 Stamsund

Steine is a fishing village in Vestvågøy Municipality in Nordland county, Norway. The village lies on the south side of the island of Vestvågøya, about 3 kilometres (1.9 mi) west of the village of Stamsund.
