= Phillip Law =

Australian scientist and explorer

Phillip Garth Law, AC, CBE, FAA, FTSE (21 April 1912 – 28 February 2010) was an Australian scientist and explorer who served as director of Australian National Antarctic Research Expeditions (ANARE) from 1949 to 1966.

== Early life ==
Law was born in Tallangatta, Victoria, the second of six children of Arthur and Lily Law. One of his younger sisters was the traveller and writer Wendy Law Suart. After attending Hamilton High School, he taught in secondary schools, including Melbourne High School where he taught physics and boxing, while studying part-time at the University of Melbourne, earning an MSc in 1941. He was the Melbourne University lightweight boxing champion and also lectured in physics there from 1943 to 1948.

During the Second World War he enlisted in the RAAF, though the university physics department, which was involved in weapons research, insisted that he continue his work there. He did however manage to visit the battle areas of New Guinea on a four-month scientific mission for the Australian Army.

== Antarctic exploration ==
He spent the first of many summers in Antarctica in 1947–8 as a senior research officer on ANARE. He soon became director due to his strong belief in the value of management and educational techniques that ensured that each individual had more than one role. During his directorship, he established bases in Mawson, Davis and Casey, and led expeditions that explored more than 5,000 kilometres (3,100 mi) of coastline and some 1,000,000 square kilometres (390,000 sq mi) of territory.

After retiring from the directorship, he chaired the Australian National Committee on Antarctic Research from 1966 to 1980. He was elected President of the Royal Society of Victoria from 1967 to 1968.

Law's wife, Nel, a secondary school teacher, professional artist and writer, was the first Australian woman to visit Antarctica when she visited Mawson in 1961. Nel died in 1990, aged 75.

In 1986, Australia established the Law Station in Antarctica named after Law. It was donated to Romania in 2006, when it was renamed to the Law-Racoviță Station. Since 2011, it is known as the Law-Racoviță-Negoiță Station, and it is still administrated by Romania.

He attended the launch of the Fourth International Polar Year on 1 March 2007 in the hall of the Royal Society of Victoria in Melbourne.

Phillip Law died on 28 February 2010, aged 97. His ashes, together with those of his wife Nel, were interred near the Mawson Station on 19 June 2011.

== Honours ==
Phillip Law was appointed a Commander of the Order of the British Empire (CBE) in the New Year's Honours of 1961.

He was appointed an Officer of the Order of Australia (AO) in the Queen's Birthday Honours of 1975 and a Companion of the Order (AC) in the Australia Day Honours of 1995.

In 1960 he was awarded the Founder's Medal of the Royal Geographical Society, in 1987 the James Cook Medal of the Royal Society of New South Wales, and in 1988, the Australian Geographic's Adventurer of the Year Award. On 1 January 2001, he was also awarded the Centenary Medal.

== Publications ==
Law published several papers on his exploration work in the Royal Geographical Society's Geographical Journal, including:

- 1954 – Australian Antarctic Expedition to Mac-Robertson Land 1954. Geographical Journal Vol. 120, Part 4, pp. 409–422.
- 1956 – Australian National Antarctic Research Expedition, 1955. Geographical Journal, Vol. 122.
- 1958 – The Antarctic voyage of MV Thala Dan, 1958. Geographical Journal.
- 1958 – Australian coastal exploration in Antarctica. Geographical Journal. Vol 124, Part 2.
- 1960 – New ANARE landings in Australian Antarctic Territory 1960. Geographical Journal.
- 1961 – Australian coastal explorations in Antarctica, 1957. Geographical Journal. Vol 127, Part 4.
- 1961 – Australian coastal explorations in Antarctica, 1959. Geographical Journal.

Books or booklets authored or coauthored by Law include:

- 1957 – ANARE: Australia's Antarctic Outposts. (With John Béchervaise). OUP: Melbourne.
- 1962 – Australia and the Antarctic. (John Murtagh Macrossan Memorial Lectures 1960). University of Queensland Press: Brisbane.
- 1964 – Antarctica – 1984. (Sir John Morris Memorial Lecture 1964). Adult Education Board of Tasmania: Hobart
- 1983 – Antarctic Odyssey. Heinemann: Melbourne. ISBN 0-434-40688-0
- 1995 – The Antarctic Voyage of HMAS Wyatt Earp. Allen & Unwin Australia. ISBN 1-86373-803-7
- 1995 – You Have to be Lucky: Antarctic and Other Adventures. Kangaroo Press: Kenthurst. ISBN 0-86417-743-7
