= Law-Racoviță-Negoiță Station =

- Antarctic base
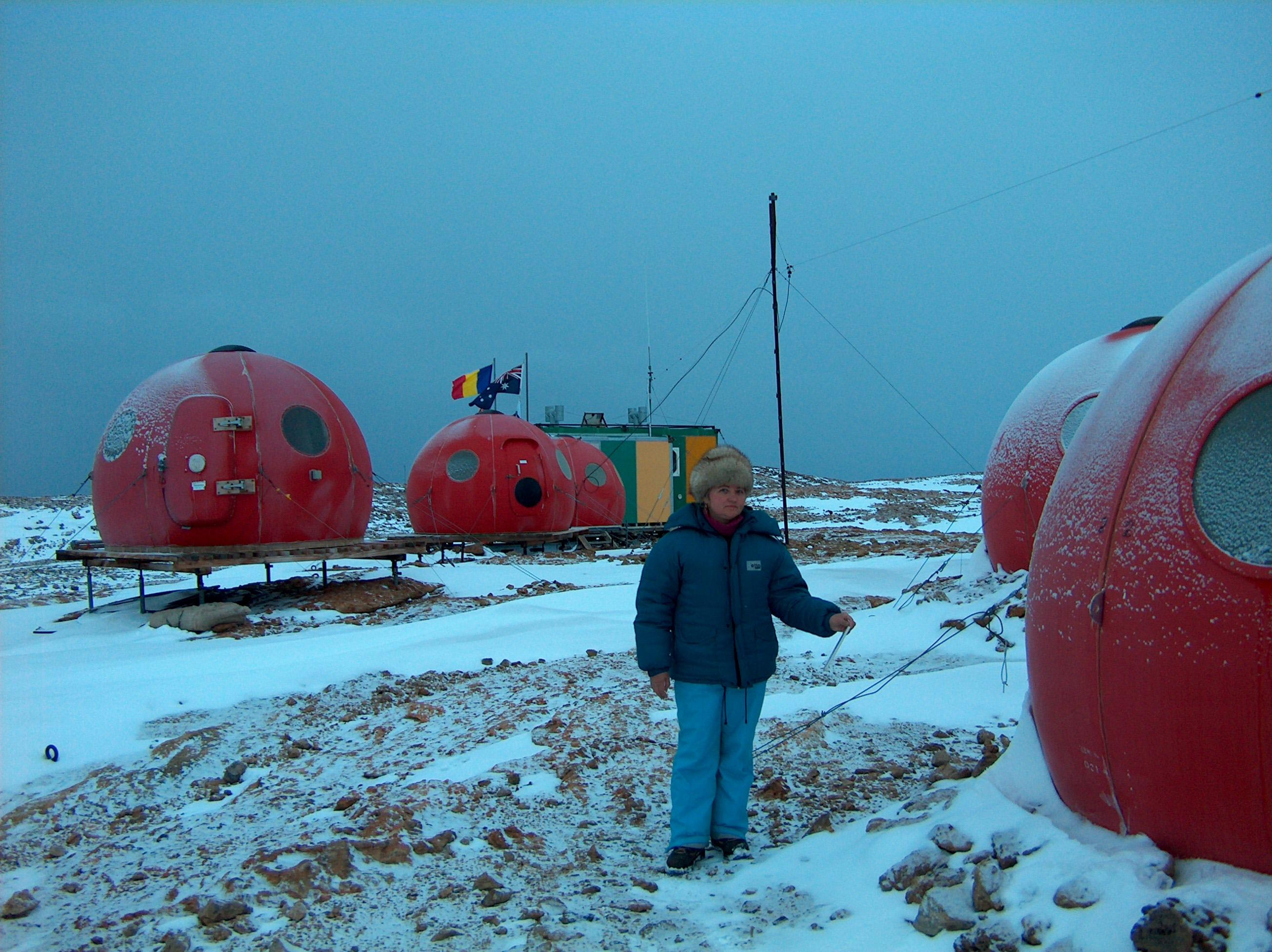
- Law-Racoviță-Negoiță Base, Larsemann Hills, East Antarctica

- Location of the Law-Racoviță-Negoiță Station in Antarctica
- Coordinates: 69°23′19″S 76°22′51″E
- Country: Romania; Australia
- Location in Antarctica: Larsemann Hills; Prydz Bay; Antarctica
- Administered by: Romanian Institute of Polar Research
- Established: 13 January 2006
- Named after: Phillip Law; Emil Racoviță; Teodor Negoiță
- Elevation: 65 m (213 ft)

Population
  - Summer: 13
  - Winter: 0
- UN/LOCODE: AQ LAW
- Type: Seasonal
- Period: Summer
- Status: Operational
- Activities: List: Biochemistry; Hydrology; Limnology; Meteorology

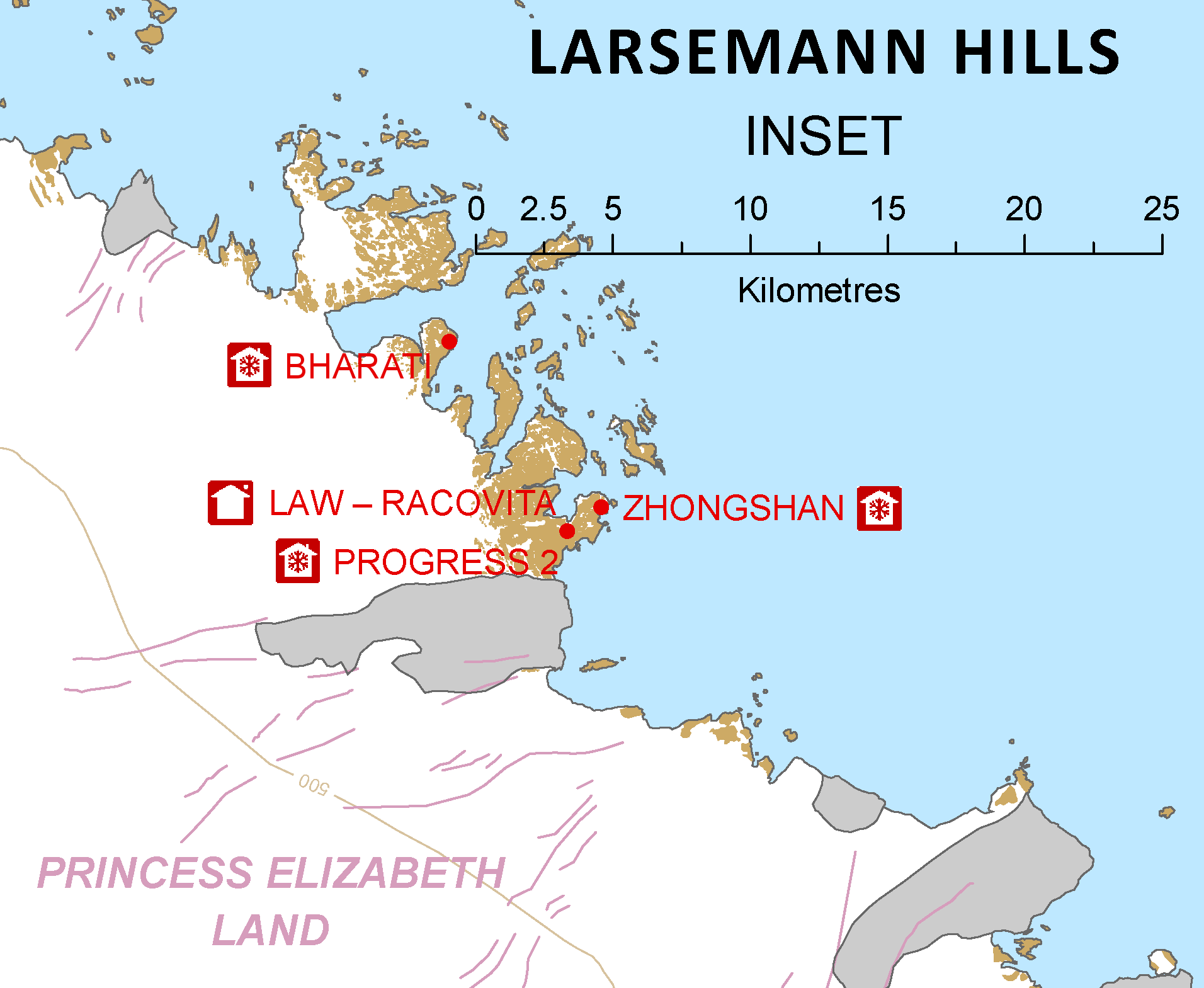
Map showing "Law-Racovita Station" on Antarctica's Larsemann Hills

The Law-Racoviță-Negoiță Station (Romanian: Stația Law-Racoviță-Negoiță), known only as the Law-Racoviță Station (Stația Law-Racoviță) until 2011, is the first Romanian station for research and exploration in Antarctica, named after the Romanian explorer Emil Racoviță and inaugurated on January 13, 2006, at the location of a station constructed in 1986 by Australia and leased to Romania. The station may be found in Princess Elizabeth Land, in the Larsemann Hills, 2 kilometres (1.2 mi) away from China's Antarctic Zhongshan Station.

== Location ==
The Law-Racoviță-Negoiță Station is placed in a rocky area about 3 kilometres (1.9 miles) from the Ingrid Christensen coast in Princess Elizabeth Land, in the Larsemann Hills of East Antarctica, at the coordinates 69°23'18.61" S, 76°22'46.2" E.

It is located at a distance of 2 kilometers from Zhongshan Station of China and Progress Station of Russia, which permits considerable cooperation between these countries. The station is located 13,352 kilometres (8,297 miles) from the capital of Romania, Bucharest.

Access to the station is made in one of two ways: via helicopter from Davis Station, approximately 80 kilometres (50 miles) northeast, or by land from Zhongshan or Progress II.

== History ==
In 1986, Australia constructed Law Station for polar research for the use of Australian researchers in the polar summer.

Explorer Teodor Negoiță's attempt to develop a Romanian base in Antarctica began in 1997, when he began to present his work for the Antarctic Treaty, which Romania ratified in 1971. No Romanian had previously contributed evidence of research. Following recognition of his research by polar researchers from other countries, no progress was made on the creation of a Romanian polar station until 2000, when Negoiță benefited from the honor of delivering the opening speech at the meeting of Antarctic Treaty nations in London, before delegations from 43 countries. The scope of this meeting entailed elaboration on a code of navigation in Antarctica, with special focus on the discussion of papers presented by Romania, the United States, and England. Negoiță presented the study "Directions on Antarctic maritime transport and protection of nature".

After two years of negotiations, during the 2005 meeting of the Antarctic Treaty in Stockholm, an agreement was signed through which Australia leased to the Romanian Antarctic Foundation and the Romanian Institute for Polar Research one of their research stations on the east coast of Antarctica, Law Station, which was temporarily renamed to Law-Racoviță Station, after Romanian explorer Emil Racoviță and placed under the directorship of Negoiță. The signing of this agreement took place in the presence of the Romanian and Australian ambassadors to each other's countries.

"After more than 100 years, I brought Racoviță back to Antarctica. I had the greatest satisfaction in my career when I acquired the base from the Australians. I was so emotional then that I couldn't even sign the treaty."- Teodor Negoiță

Following the inauguration of the station in Antarctica, Teodor Negoiță made his thirteenth expedition to the polar region, celebrating two and a half months in the Antarctic, with his team of researchers (including the first Romanian women scientists in Antarctica, a biologist and biochemist on his team). They conducted research on the soil, sediment, and microorganisms of the continent.

On February 20, 2006, the leased station was officially handed over to Romania from Australia. Currently, it is open only in the "warm" season.

Following the death of Negoiță, on 9 December 2011, the station was renamed to Law-Racoviță-Negoiță Station.

== The base ==
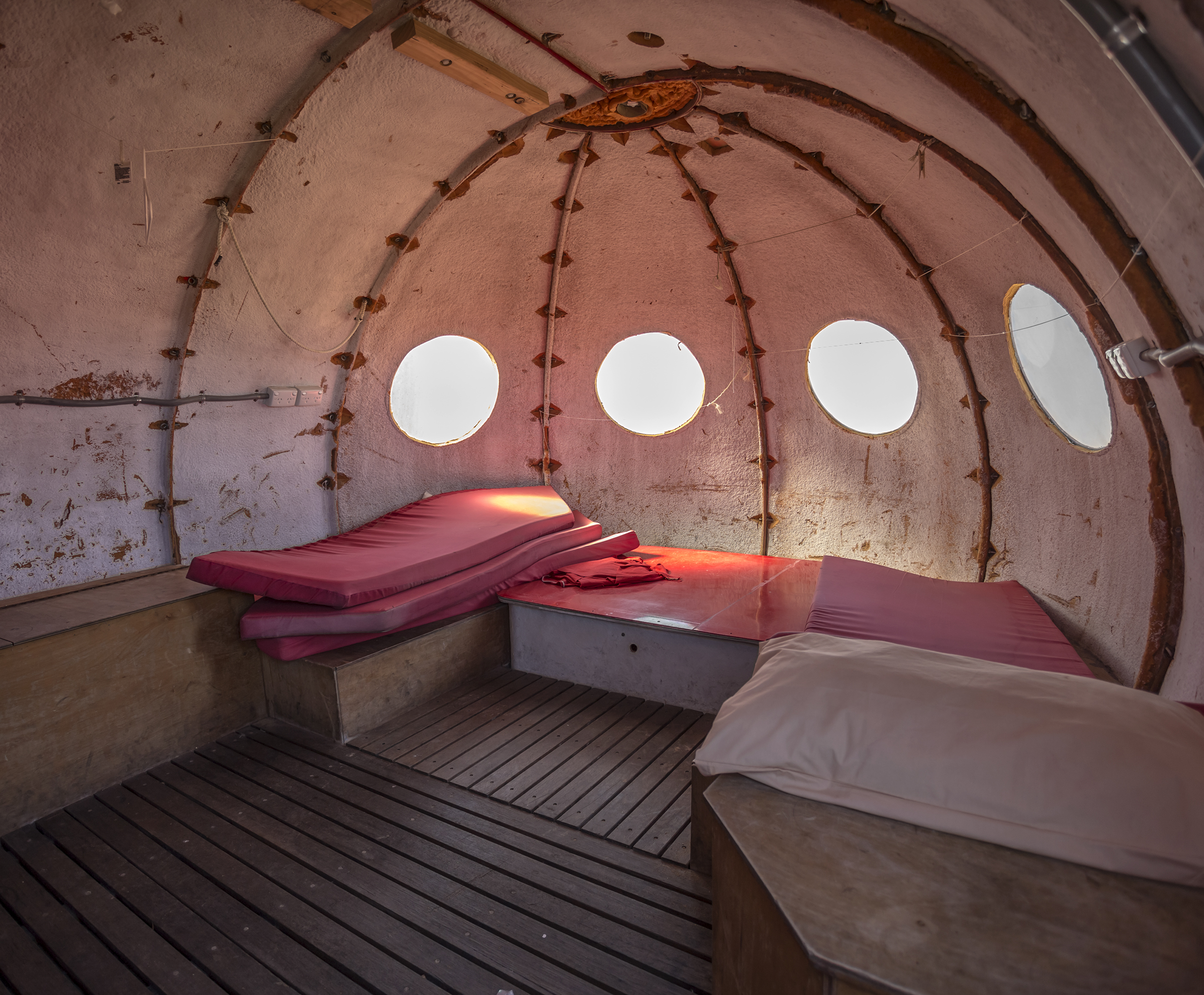
Igloo satellite cabins at Law-Racoviță-Negoiță, inside

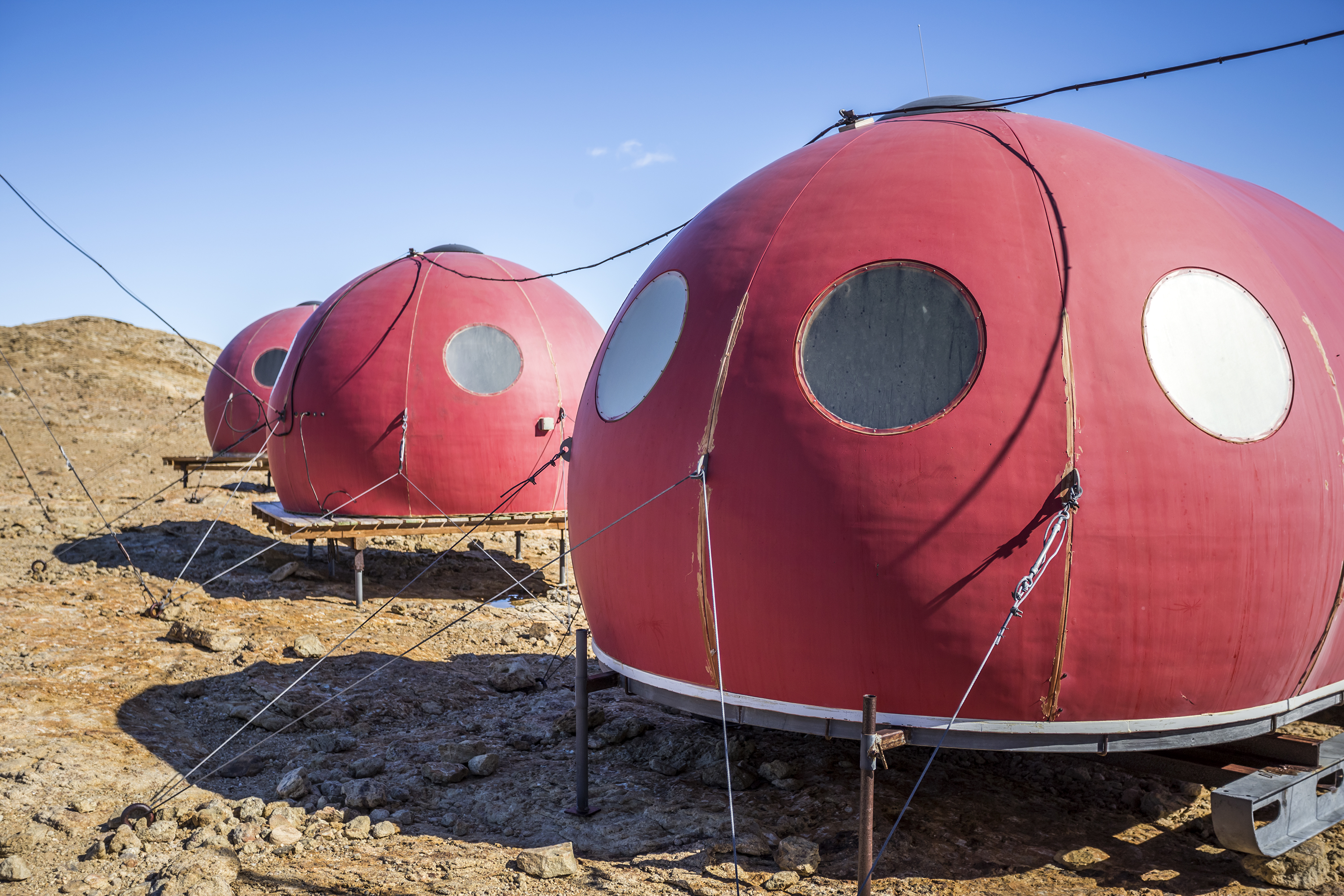
and outside

Law-Racoviță-Negoiță is constructed from anti-corrosive and insulating materials - a necessity in Antarctica - with one large laboratory building and five domed red dormitories, a radio station, and a deposit station for combustibles and other waste. The buildings are designed to adapt to the cold environment, fixed to small platforms which may be adjusted by foot, with a minimal impact on the environment. The building which serves as a laboratory is constructed from prefabricated panels, which require a minimum of time to assemble. The dormitories are red and constructed with a fiberglass exterior and polyurethane foam isolation on the interior, and windows constructed from double-paned polycarbonate. All waste produced is deposited in a receptacle evacuated daily by members of the expedition. The base is supplied by electric energy through a small gas generator and a solar panel. The nearby lake contains potable water, and water is also obtained from melting snow. Contact is maintained with other stations via a permanent VHF radio, powered by the solar panel. For contact elsewhere, every expedition has access to a satellite telephone.

== Research ==
Law-Racoviță-Negoiță Station is named after Philip Law, the first researcher to study East Antarctica; Emil Racoviță, the first Romanian to reach the continent of Antarctica, a scientist on the expedition of the ship Belgica (1897–1899); and Teodor Negoiță, an important figure for the establishment of the only Romanian station on Antarctica.

"It is a first for Antarctic research in Romania, a signatory country to the Antarctic Treaty in 1971, which gives us the right to use the territory in the extreme south in a peaceful way. (...) It is easier for a country in Romania's position to use an old base than to construct a new one." - Teodor Negoiță

The annual cost of use of this station by Romanian expeditions in the region was estimated at US$20,000.

Law-Racoviță-Negoiță Station welcomed the first team of researchers in December 2006 at the beginning of the austral summer. The Romanian team undertook bioprospecting, ecological, meteorological, seismic, geomagnetic, and radio research.

The research program included studies on polar law, biochemistry and biotechnology, pharmaceutical and agricultural research, hydrological and limnological studies, medical research, meteorology, and astro-climatic research. Data from these studies was analyzed in Romanian laboratories.

Law-Racoviță-Negoiță was privately funded by the Romanian Antarctic Foundation through the Romanian Institute of Polar Research. After lease expired Law-Racoviță-Negoiță was handed back to Australia as Law Base. https://www.antarctica.gov.au/antarctic-operations/stations-and-field-locations/field-sites/

== See also ==
- Australian Antarctic Territory
- List of Antarctic research stations
- List of Antarctic field camps
