= Romanian Antarctic Foundation =

Romanian research institute

The Romanian Antarctic Foundation (Romanian: Fundația Antarctică Română, FAR) is a Romanian research institute that manages Romania's Polar research in Antarctica. The Foundation is one of the partners working on the research icebreaker Aurora Borealis. It was created on 1995 and is administered by the Romanian Institute for Polar Research.
