= Emil Racoviță =

Romanian polar explorer

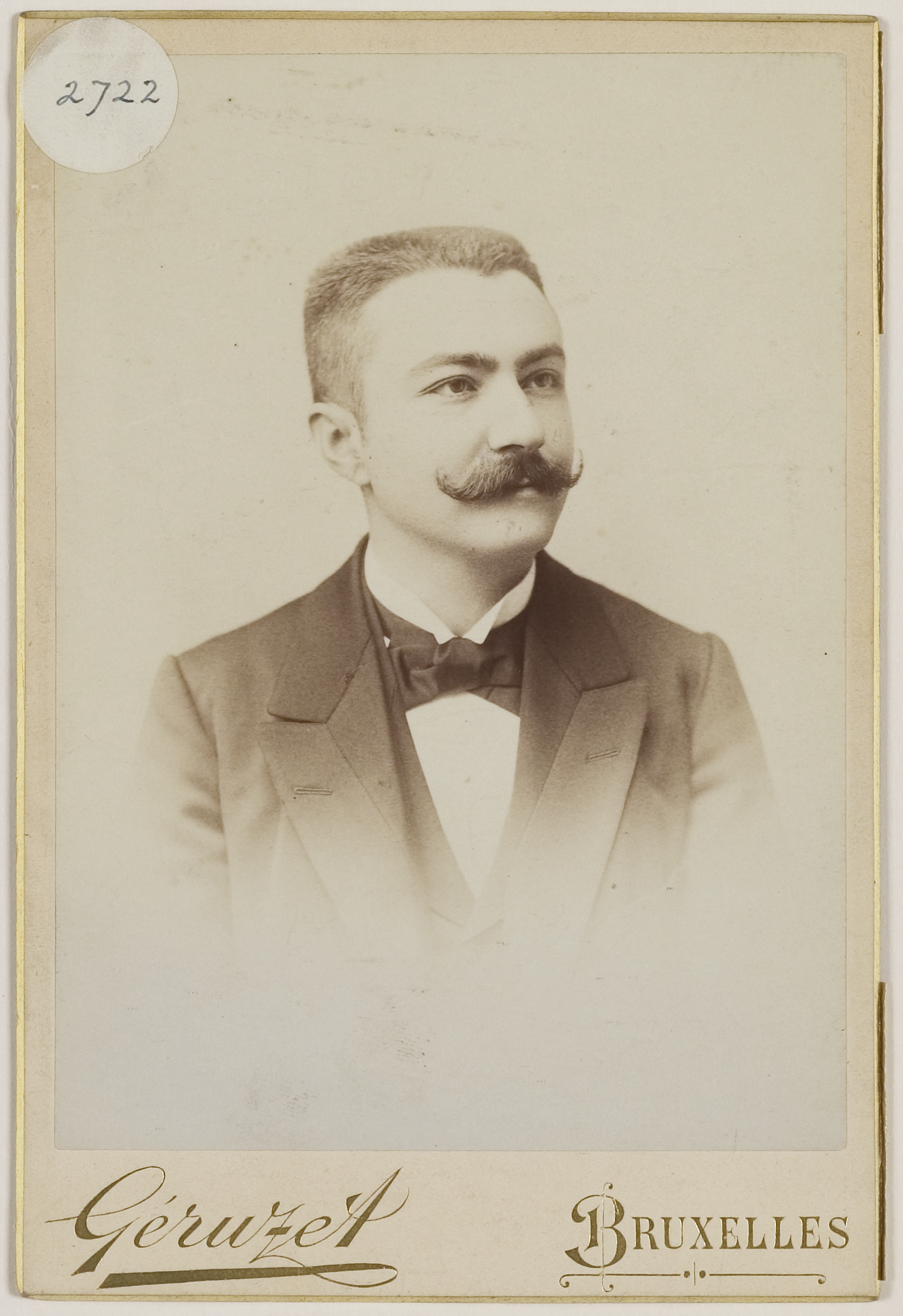
- Racoviță around 1897
- Born: Emil Gheorghe Racoviță; 15 November 1868; Iași, United Principalities of Moldavia and Wallachia
- Died: 19 November 1947 (aged 79); Cluj-Napoca, Kingdom of Romania
- Resting place: Hajongard Cemetery, Cluj-Napoca
- Education: University of Paris
- Known for: Co-founder of biospeleology; Participation on the Belgian Antarctic Expedition
- Scientific career
- Fields: Biology, speleology, zoology
- Workplaces: Babeș-Bolyai University
- Thesis: Le lobe cephalique et l'encéphale des Annélides Polychète (1896)
- Doctoral advisor: Henri de Lacaze-Duthiers

Emil Gheorghe Racoviță (Romanian: [eˈmil ˈrakovit͡sə]; 15 November 1868 – 19 November 1947) was a Romanian biologist, zoologist, speleologist, and Antarctic explorer.

Together with Grigore Antipa, he was one of the most noted promoters of natural sciences in Romania. Racoviță was the first Romanian to have gone on a scientific research expedition to the Antarctic. He was an influential professor, scholar and researcher, and served as President of the Romanian Academy from 1926 to 1929.

== Early life ==
Born in Iași, he grew up on a family estate, in Șurănești, Vaslui County. He started his education in Iași, where he had Ion Creangă as a teacher, and continued his secondary education at the Institutele Unite, a private high school for boys in Iași, taking his baccalauréat in 1886. He then studied law at the University of Paris, obtaining a law degree in 1889. However, he did not pursue a law career, choosing instead to turn to the natural sciences.

His mentor was zoologist and biologist Henri de Lacaze-Duthiers, a professor at the Sorbonne and at the Muséum national d'histoire naturelle. Racoviță earned a B.S. degree in 1891, and a Ph.D. degree in 1896, for a thesis on Le lobe cephalique et l'encéphale des Annélides Polychète ("The cephalous lobe and the encephalon of polychaetous annelids").

As a student, Racovița was attracted to socialism. He was a founding member of the Second International, as well as a leading member of the Social Democratic Workers' Party of Romania.

== Belgica expedition ==
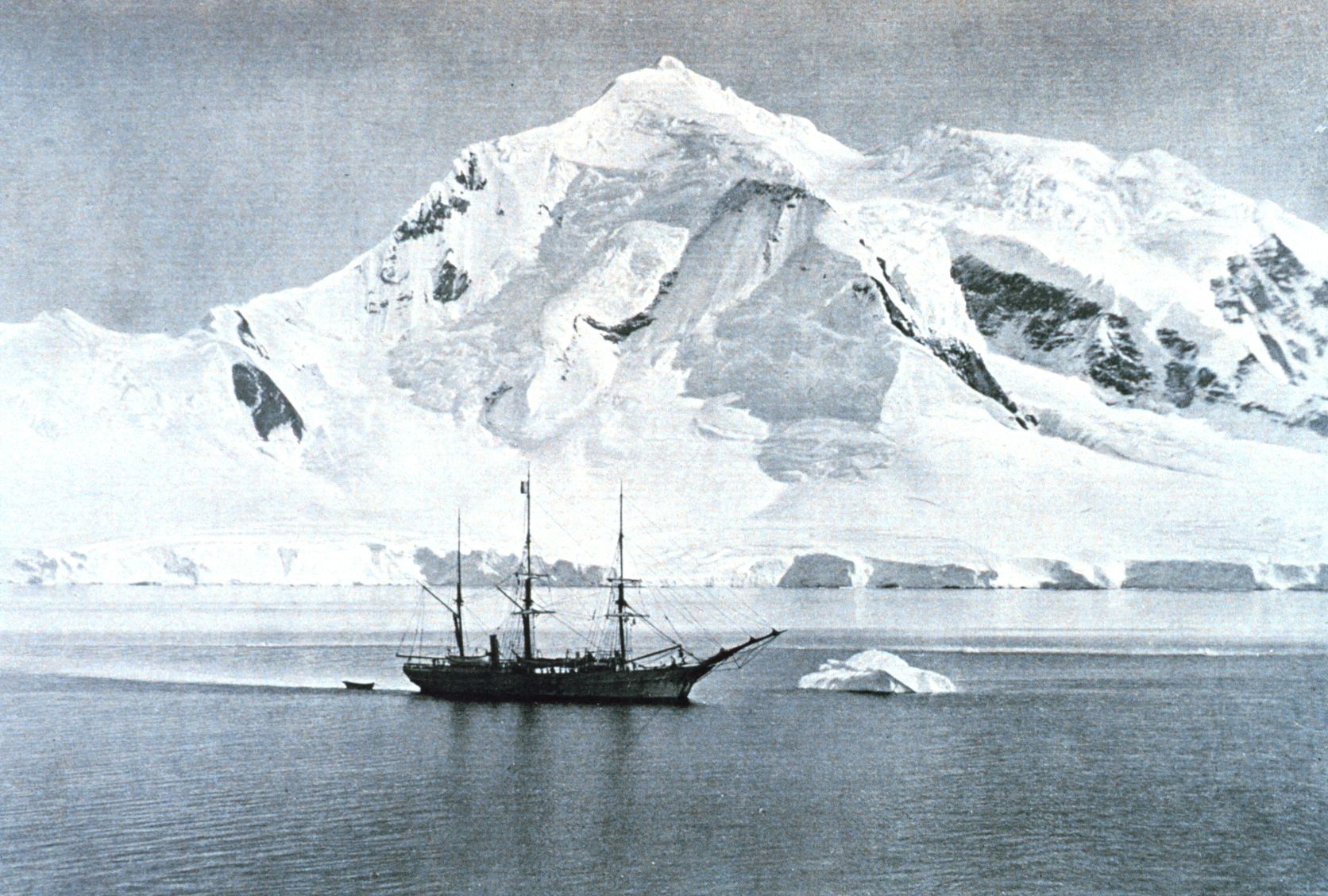
Belgica in the Gerlache Strait

As a promising young scientist, Racoviță was selected to be part of an international team that started out on a research expedition to Antarctica, aboard the Belgica. The expedition was led by the Belgian officer Adrien de Gerlache, who was also the ship's owner.

=== Ship and crew ===
On 16 August 1897, under the aegis of the Royal Society of Geography in Brussels, the Belgica, a former Norwegian wooden whaler, left the port of Antwerp, setting sail for the South. It was the ship that gave its name to the whole expedition. The three-masted ship was equipped with a 160-horsepower engine.

The 19 members of the team were of various nationalities. The first mate of the vessel was Roald Amundsen – who was to conquer the South Pole in 1911. Apart from Racoviță, the team was made up of Belgian physicist Émile Danco, Polish geologist and oceanographer Henryk Arctowski with his assistant Antoni Bolesław Dobrowolski and American physician Frederick Cook.

=== Scientific work ===
The team left the deck of the ship 22 times, in order to collect scientific data, to conduct investigations and experiments. Racoviță was the first researcher to collect botanical and zoological samples from areas beyond the Antarctic Circle. He found the first flowering plants that were collected in Antarctica, and collected the type specimens of the flightless midge Belgica antarctica, the only insect that can survive year-round in Antarctica.

Belgica made the first daily meteorological recordings and measurements in Antarctica, every hour, for a whole year. The scientists also collected information on oceanic currents and terrestrial magnetism, with as many as 10 volumes of scientific conclusions being published at the end of the expedition, which was considered a success.

=== Obstacles ===
The expedition encountered several hardships. Between 10 March 1898 and 14 March 1899, Belgica was caught between ice blocks, making it impossible to sail any further. The crew had to carve a 75-meter-long (250 ft) canal through a six-meter-thick (20 ft) layer of ice, in order to generate a waterway by which to sail to a navigable body of water. Belgica returned to Europe in 1899 without two team-members, who had died during the expedition: Norwegian mariner Carl Wiencke (lost overboard), and Émile Danco {died natural causes}.

Racoviță's diary, published in 1899, makes mention of the difficulties that the team-members had to endure. Photos of the time show that he was hardly recognisable after returning from the expedition. The results of his research were published in 1900, under the title La vie des animaux et des plantes dans l'Antarctique ("The life of animals and plants in Antarctica"). A year after his return, Racoviță was appointed director of the Banyuls-sur-Mer resort and editor of the review Archives de zoologie expérimentale et générale.

== Later life ==
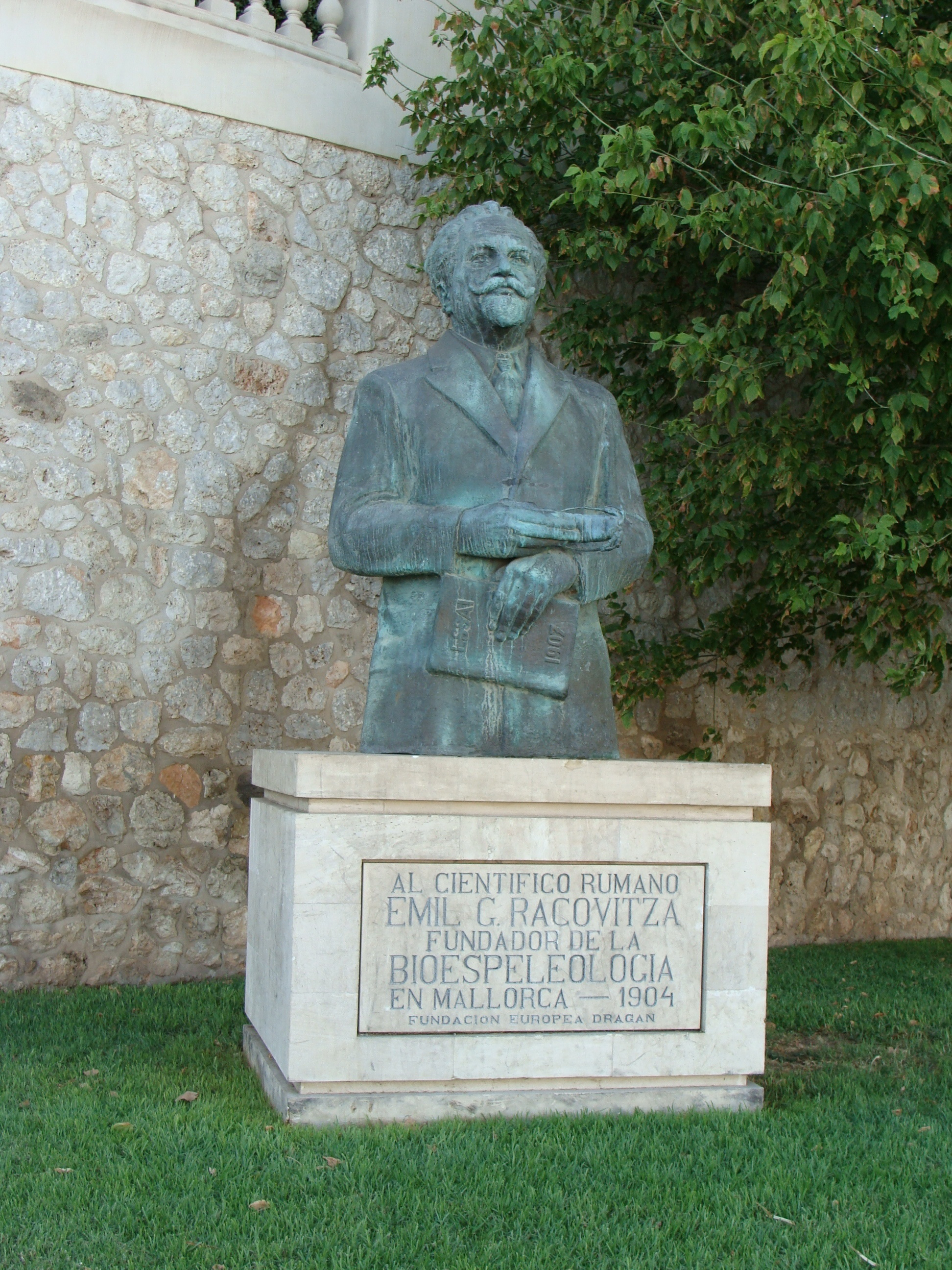
Statue in Palma de Mallorca

Racoviță continued his research, contributing to speleology and exploring over 1,400 caves in France, Spain, Algeria, Italy, and Slovenia. He is considered to be, together with René Jeannel, one of the founders of biospeleology. He was particularly interested in isopoda, of which he discovered many. He was among the early proponents of speciation by geographic isolation, writing about ideas of peripatric speciation in 1868.

In 1919, Racoviță became head of the biology department at the Upper Dacia University in Cluj-Napoca, and served as Rector of the University from 1929 to 1930. He founded the world's first speleological institute there on 26 April 1920, (Note: The University of Bristol Spelæological Society, a student society, was founded in 1919.) first as a section which was, however, to function independently since 1956, with professor Constantin Motas. In 1920, he became a titular member of the Romanian Academy, and served as President of the Academy from 1926 to 1929.

In the aftermath of the Second Vienna Award of August 1940, the Faculty of Sciences and the Institute of Speleology at the University of Cluj were forced to move out of the city and take refuge in Timișoara. After World War II, Racoviță made great efforts to reorganize the institute. He died in November 1947 in Cluj-Napoca, and was buried in the city's Hajongard Cemetery.

== Legacy ==
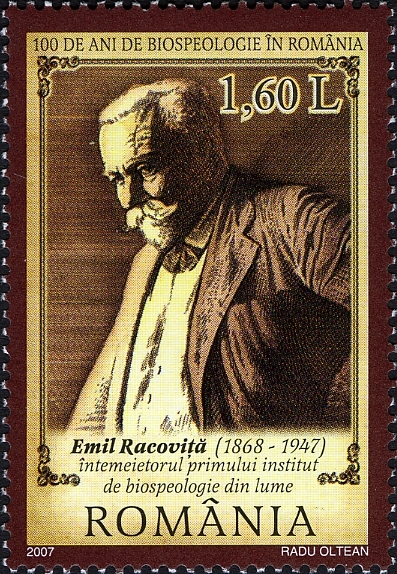
Stamp from 2007

There are two caves named after him. One is the Emil Racoviță Cave, located in Criva, Briceni; with an area of 50 hectares (120 acres), it is the largest cave in Moldova and the third longest cave in Europe. The other one is the Racoviță Cave, located in Iabalcea, Caraș-Severin County.

In 2006, the first Romanian Antarctic exploration station was named the Law-Racoviță Station (known since 2011 as the Law-Racoviță-Negoiță Station).

Poșta Română issued several stamps in his honor: 55 bani and 1.20 lei stamps in 1958, a 55 bani stamp in 1968, a 4 lei stamp in 1985, a 2 lei stamp in 1986, a 4.50 lei stamp in 1997, and a 1.60 lei stamp in 2007. The last one is part of a series of four stamps (Scott 4911–4914) commemorating 100 years since the foundation by Racoviță of the first biospeleology institute in the world.

In 2018, on the 150th anniversary of Racoviță's birth, the National Bank of Romania put into circulation a commemorative silver coin with a face value of 10 lei.

== See also ==
- European and American voyages of scientific exploration

== Publications ==
- Essai sur les problèmes biospéologiques ("Essay on biospeleological problems"; 1907)
- Cétacés. Voyage du S. Y. Belgica en 1897–1899. Résultats scientifiques. Zoologie. J. E. Buschmann, Anvers, 1903.
- Énumération des grottes visitées, series 1–7. Archives de Zoologie expérimentale et générale, Paris, 1907–1929 (in collaboration with René Jeannel) ("Enumeration of visited caves")
- Speologia: O știință nouă a străvechilor taine subpământești. Astra, Secția Științelor naturale, Biblioteca populară, Cluj, 1927. ("Speleology: A new science of the old underworld mysteries"; 1927)
- Evoluția și problemele ei ("Evolution and its problems"; 1929)
