= Larsemann Hills =

Coastal hills in Princess Elizabeth Land, Antarctica

Coordinates: 69°24′S 76°13′E

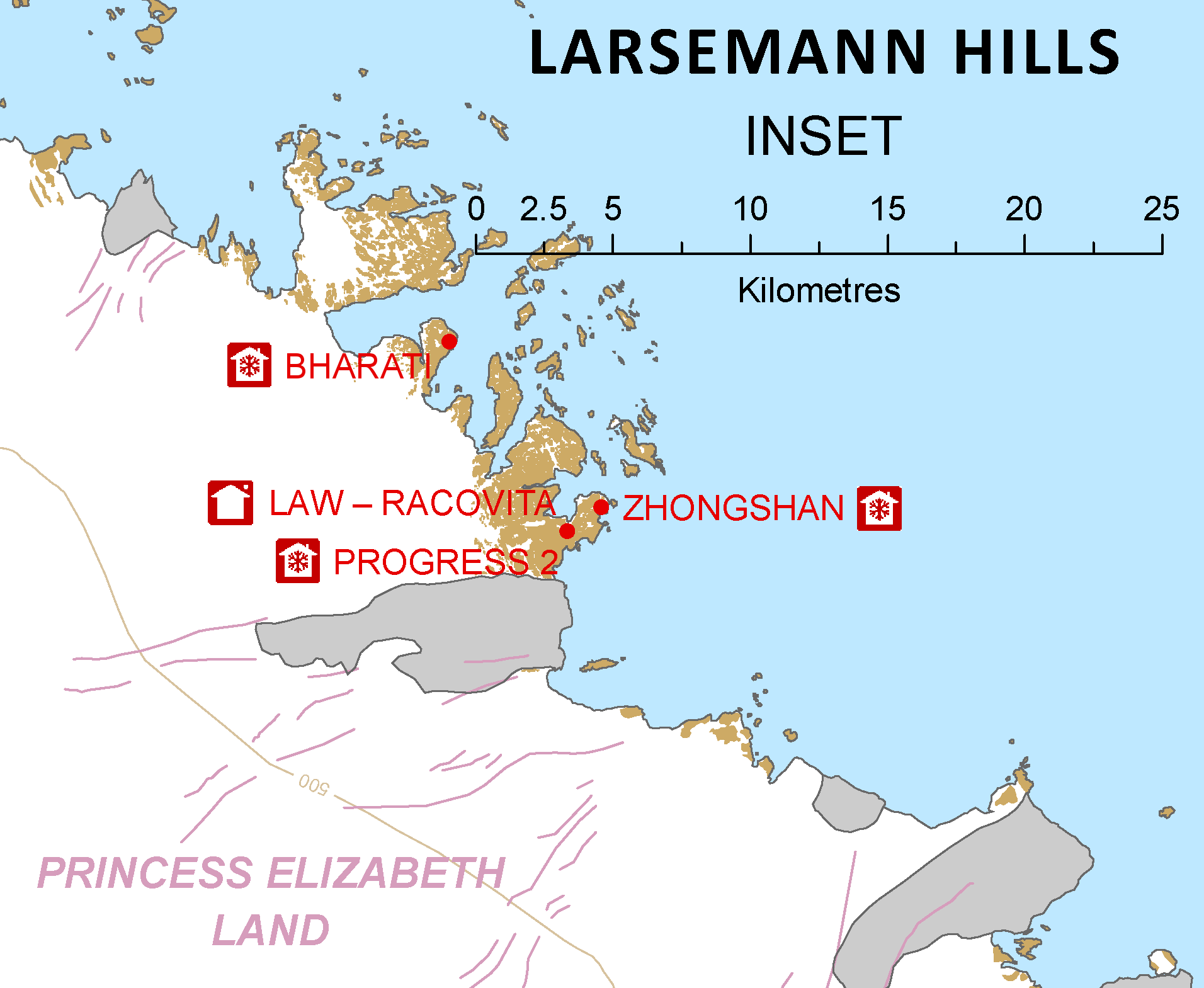
Map of Larsemann Hills

The Larsemann Hills are a series of low rounded coastal hills along the southeastern shore of Prydz Bay, Antarctica extending for 9 nautical miles (17 km) from Dålk Glacier. They were discovered in February 1935 by Captain Klarius Mikkelsen from the whaling ship Thorshavn, sent out by Norwegian whaling magnate Lars Christensen, and given this name.

The bedrock of the Larsemann Hills contains an unusually high abundance of boron and phosphate minerals and is the location of discovery of four new species of mineral. In 2014, the Stornes Peninsula within the Larsemann Hills was declared an Antarctic Specially Protected Area due to its mineral diversity.

== Research stations ==
As an Antarctic oasis the hills are the home of several Antarctic research stations.

- The abandoned original Russian Progress Station.
- The relocated new Russian Progress II Station.
- The Chinese Zhongshan station
- The Australian-donated Romanian Law-Racoviță-Negoiță Station
- The Indian research station Bharati
