= Drygalski Island =

Island in Queen Mary Land, Antarctica

- Location within Antarctica

Geography
- Location: Antarctica
- Coordinates: 65°45′S 92°30′E
- Area: 220 km^{2} (85 sq mi)
- Length: 20.4 km (12.68 mi)
- Highest elevation: 325 m (1066 ft)

Administration
- Administered under the Antarctic Treaty System

Demographics
- Population: Uninhabited

Mir Мир
- Antarctic research station
- Interactive map of Mir
- Coordinates: 65°45′00″S 92°26′00″E
- Established: 20 May 1960
- Closed: 6 August 1960

Government
  - Type: Administration
  - Body: Soviet Antarctic Expedition
- Elevation: 327 m (1,073 ft)
- Active times: One winter

Drygalski Island is an ice-capped island that is 20.4 kilometres (11 nmi) long and rises to 325 m (1,066 ft) in the Davis Sea of the Southern Ocean, about 85 km (53 mi) north of the coast of Queen Mary Land and 45 km (28 mi) north-northeast of Cape Filchner. The island has an area of 220 km^{2} (85 sq mi).

Drygalski Island was first viewed from the continental Antarctic coast in November 1912 by members of the Western Base Party of the Australian Antarctic Expedition (1911–1914), and observed more closely from Sir Douglas Mawson's ship Aurora on the homeward journey in January 1914. Because Drygalski Island was thought to be "Drygalski's High Land", charted by Professor Erich von Drygalski of the German Antarctic Expedition (1901–1903) in 1902, Drygalski's name was given by Sir Douglas Mawson to the island.

A temporary field station named Mir was opened from 20 May to 6 August in 1960 on the island by the Soviet Union to study meteorological conditions.

== See also ==
- Composite Antarctic Gazetteer
- List of Antarctic and sub-Antarctic islands
- List of Antarctic islands south of 60° S
- SCAR
- Territorial claims in Antarctica
