= Druzhnaya Station =

Druzhnaya IV Station Дружная-4
- Antarctic research station
- Location in Antarctica
- Coordinates: 69°44′00″S 73°42′00″E
- Region: Amery Ice Shelf
- Location: Landing Bluff
- Established: 1 January 1987
- Closed: 19 February 2015

Government
  - Type: Administration
  - Body: Russian Antarctic Expedition
- Elevation: 20 m (66 ft)

Population (2017)
  - Summer: 50
  - Winter: 0
- UN/LOCODE: AQ DRZ
- Active times: Every summer

Druzhnaya Station is any one of four different Antarctic research stations operated by the Soviet Union and later Russia from 1976 to 2013.

== Druzhnaya I ==
Druzhnaya I, II and III Stations
- Antarctic research station
- Interactive map of Druzhnaya I, II and III Stations

Government
  - Type: Administration
  - Body: Soviet Antarctic Expedition
- Active times: Every summer

Druzhnaya I Station Дружная-1 Druzhnaya Station (until 1982)
- Last location in Antarctica
- Coordinates: 77°32′00″S 40°13′00″W
- Region: Filchner–Ronne Ice Shelf
- Established: December 1975
- Destroyed: February 1987

Population
  - Summer: 150
  - Winter: 0

Druzhnaya I was established in 1975 as seasonal field camps on the Filchner Ice Shelf to carry out topographic and geodetic mapping of the local area.

In 1986, satellite images revealed ice breakup near Druzhnaya I. It drifted to sea in 1986 when the ice it was on broke from the main ice shelf as iceberg A23a. It was later discovered at sea by the ship Kapitan Kondratyev. Its equipment and prefabricated structures were airlifted to Druzhnaya III shortly after its construction.

== Druzhnaya II ==
Druzhnaya II Station Дружная-2
- Last location in Antarctica
- Coordinates: 75°36′00″S 57°52′00″W
- Region: Filchner–Ronne Ice Shelf
- Established: 13 January 1982
- Closed: 25 February 1986

Druzhnaya II was a temporary field camp that operated from January 13 to February 21, 1982, on the Ronne Ice Shelf. It supported in the carrying out of radar sounding of the ice shelf.

== Druzhnaya III ==
Druzhnaya III Station Дружная-3
- Location in Antarctica
- Coordinates: 71°06′00″S 10°49′00″W
- Region: Queen Maud Land
- Location: Near Cape Norvegia
- Established: 19 January 1987
- Closed: 1991

Druzhnaya III was established in 1987 near Cape Norvegia. The station was constructed in two weeks. Kapitan Kondratyev offloaded materials for the station immediately before proceeding to its Druzhnaya I salvage mission. It was closed in 1991.

== Druzhnaya IV ==
Druzhnaya IV was established in 1987 near Sandefjord Bay (Coronation Island). Its main purposes were the logistic support to Soyuz Station and assistance with the creation of the Progress Station. It operated every summer season from 1991. It was last used in the summer of 2015.

== See also ==
- List of Antarctic research stations
- List of Antarctic field camps
