= Soyuz Station =

Soyuz Station База Союз
- Antarctic research station
- Location in Antarctica
- Coordinates: 70°34′36″S 68°47′30″E
- Region: Mac. Robertson Land
- Location: Near Beaver Lake
- Established: 3 December 1982
- Closed: 2007

Government
  - Type: Administration
  - Body: AARI, Russia
- Elevation: 360 m (1,180 ft)
- Time zone: UTC+5
- Active times: Every summer
- Website: aari.aq

Soyuz Station is a Russian (formerly Soviet) Antarctic research station, located on the shores of Beaver Lake, 260 km off Prydz Bay on the Lars Christensen Coast of the Mac Robertson Land in East Antarctica.

== Location and climate ==
The station is located on the eastern shore of Beaver Lake, in the Amery Oasis, about 260 km from the coast of the Prydz Bay. Temperatures in the summer season vary from -25 to 3.5 °C, the wind blows at a speed of 5–9 m/s, reaches a maximum of 20–25 m/s (in gusts up to 30 m/s). The weather is most favorable for work in December and January, when snowstorms are the rarest.

== History ==
The Soyuz station was opened on December 3, 1982, during the 28th Soviet Antarctic expedition as a support base for prospecting in the Prince Charles Mountains during the summer season. Scientists stationed in it conducted geological and geophysical research. Meteorological research was also regularly conducted there, mainly for the needs of aviation. The more accessible Družnaja 4 Station, located on the coast, provided logistical support for the Soyuz station. The station was closed on February 28, 1989, in connection with the changes accompanying the collapse of the USSR. Since 2007, it was planned to restore some work at the station, after some reconditioning work was done in summer 2006–2007. The Council of Managers of National Antarctic Programs website reported it as a summer base in 2014.

== See also ==
- List of Antarctic research stations
- List of Antarctic field camps
- Soviet Antarctic Expedition
