= Komsomolskaya (Antarctic research station) =

Komsomolskaya Station Комсомольская
- Antarctic research station
- Location in Antarctica
- Coordinates: 74°06′15″S 97°30′10″E
- Region: Queen Mary Land
- Established: 6 November 1957
- Closed: 1962

Government
  - Type: Administration
  - Body: AARI, Soviet Union
- Elevation: 3,500 m (11,500 ft)
- Active times: All year-round
- Website: aari.ru

Komsomolskaya was a Soviet Antarctic inland research station founded in 1957 in Queen Mary Land, in eastern Antarctica. It was a year-round station till 1959, then used as a seasonal outpost till 1962 when it was shut down permanently. Nonetheless it is still used as a fuel storage stop for supply caravans en route from Mirny Station to Vostok Station.

The station was located 3,500 metres (11,500 ft) above sea level, and 760 kilometres (470 mi) inland from Mirny Station.

Estonian writer Juhan Smuul spent a week in Komsomolskaya in 1958 and described the life and working there in his book Antarctica Ahoy!: The Ice Book, originally published in 1960 as Jäine raamat.

== See also ==
- List of Antarctic research stations
- List of Antarctic field camps
