= Artigas Base =

Artigas Station
- Antarctic base
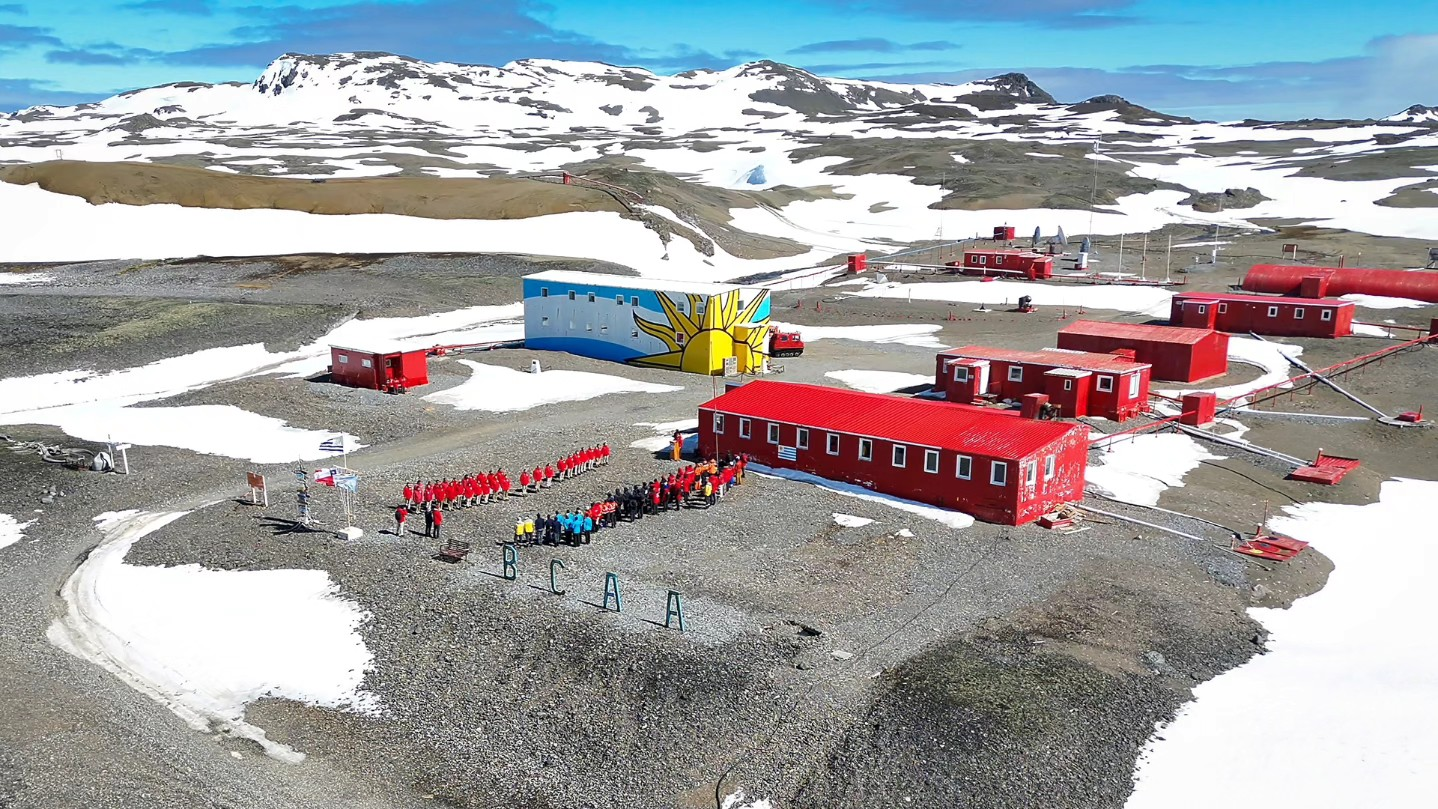
- Artigas Base in summer 2025.

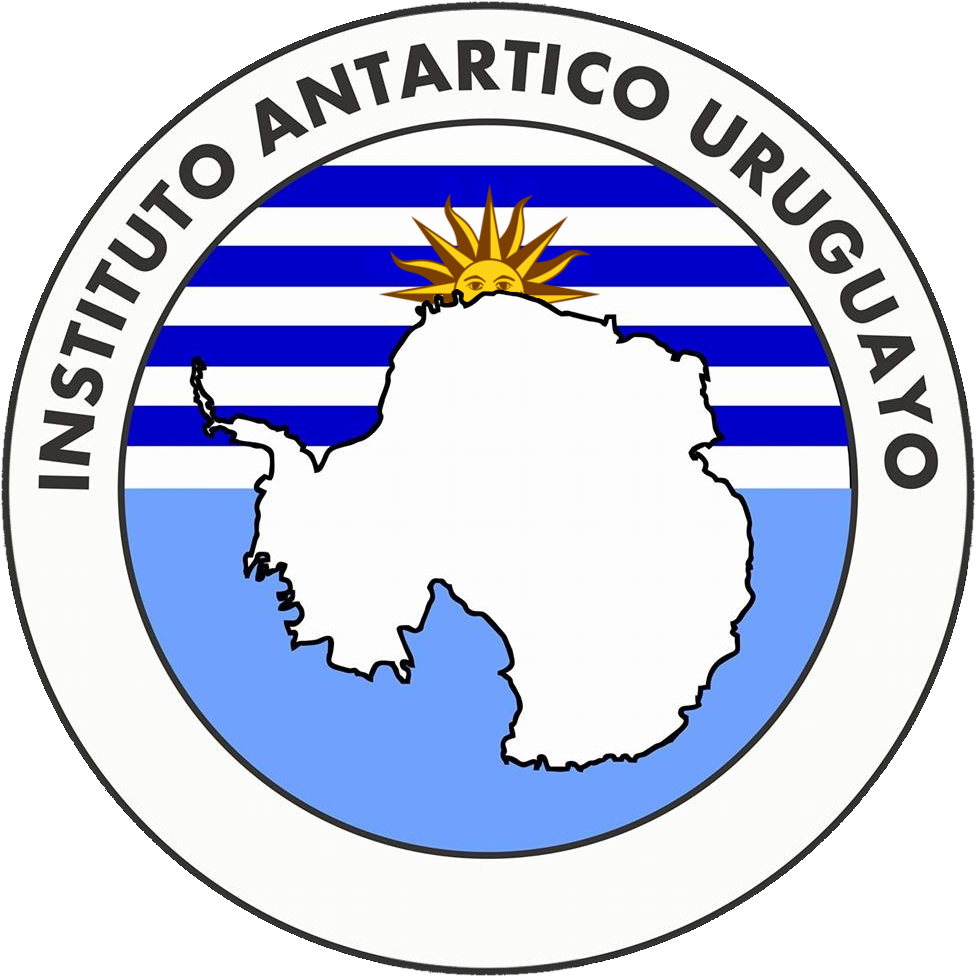
- Flag Seal

- Location of Artigas Base in Antarctica
- Coordinates: 62°11′04″S 58°54′14″W
- Country: Uruguay
- Location in Antarctica: King George Island; South Shetland Islands
- Administered by: Uruguayan Antarctic Institute
- Established: 22 December 1984
- Named for: José Gervasio Artigas
- Elevation: 17 m (56 ft)

Population (2017)
  - Summer: 60
  - Winter: 8
- UN/LOCODE: AQ ART
- Type: All-year round
- Period: Annual
- Status: Operational
- Activities: List: Geodesy; Glaciology; Ionosphere; Stratospheric ozone monitoring

Artigas Base main building hosts 62 beds.

41º anniversary conmemoration.

The General Artigas Station (Spanish: Base Científica Antártica Artigas), also referred to as the Artigas Base, is the larger of the two Uruguayan scientific research stations in Antarctica, the other one being Elichiribehety Base. It is one of the 68 permanent bases in Antarctica.

== Organization ==
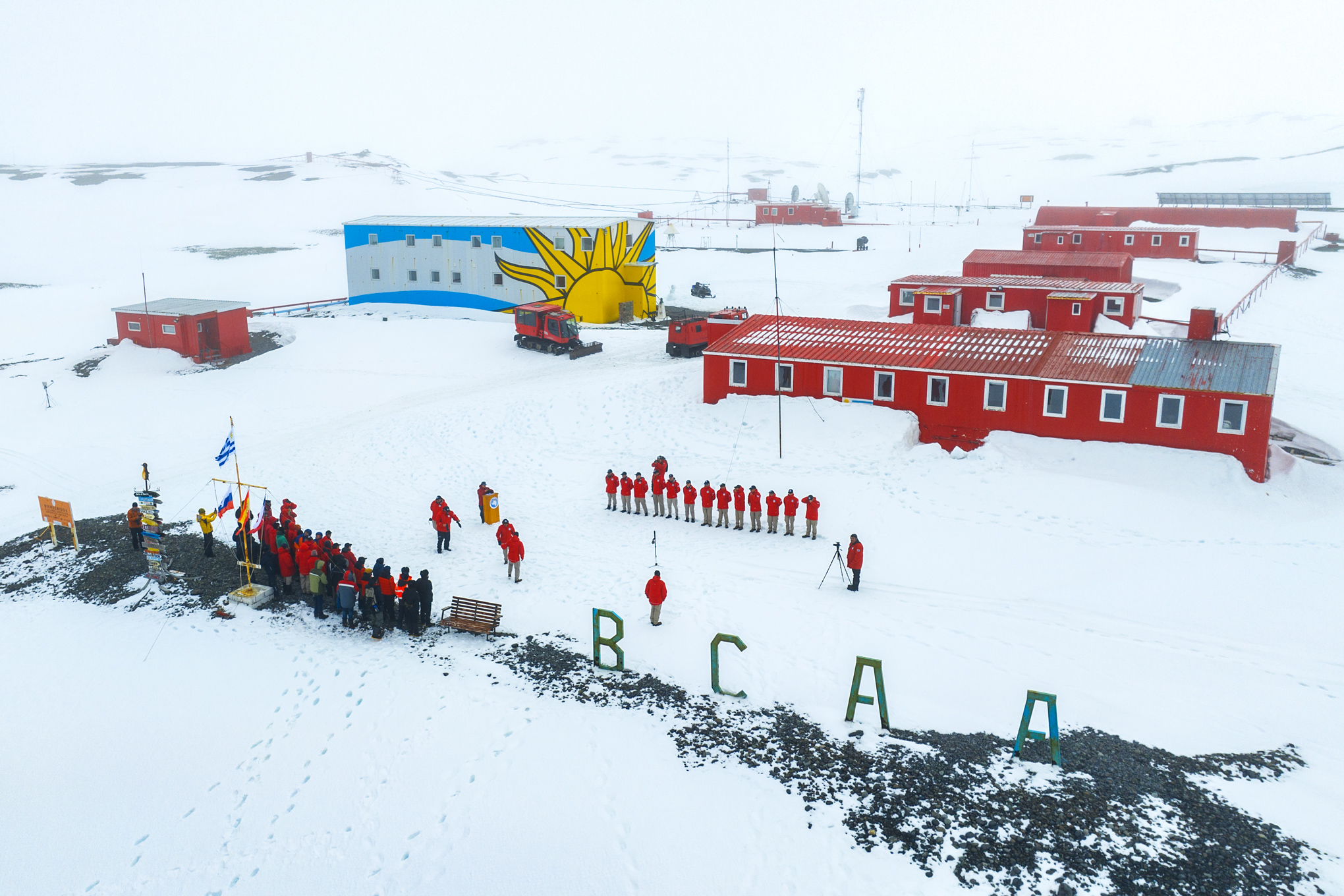
Artigas Base in winter 2024.

Bust of José Artigas.

The Artigas Base depends on the Uruguayan Antarctic Institute Plans & Operations Direction which is ruled by an Interministerial Council, with delegates of MoD, Foreign Affairs and ministry of Education and Culture. Uruguay, a Consultative member of Antarctic Treaty since 7 October 1985, has a permanent, active and autonomous activity as a National Governmental Program in Antarctic. It comes to effect operating an all year round station in King George Island, South Shetland, and seasonally at Antarctic Peninsula, and onboard its vessel, where performs scientific activity based on SCAR & Treaty needs and recommendations, supported by own logistic sea and air transport, and operating under COMNAP guidelines. Has delegates and members as full member of SCAR, SCAR-WG, COMNAP-SCALOP networks & WG, CCAMLR and ATCM.

Since 1984 research has been performed in these areas:

Glaciology: General Glaciology on KGI, South Shetlands, and Antarctic Peninsula, in various fields aiming to detect environmental changes due to anthropogenic activities and those related as response to climatic changes. This program is in scope of SCAR recommendations and is being carried out in cooperation with other nations operating in Antarctica(KORDI)

Atmospheric sciences Calibration of effects of the atmosphere on metals commonly used in the Antarctic Mossbauer spectroscopy to identify atmospheric corrosion products Installation and operation of an ionospheric laboratory at Artigas, the Uruguayan year-round research station on King George Island

Ocean sciences Comparative studies of physical and chemical variables in coastal waters of Fildes Bay Observations of the Antarctic Polar Front (Antarctic Convergence) Marine meteorology of Drake passage, according to SCAR and Treaty objectives.

Earth sciences Satellite geodesy applications for SCAR_EPOCH & GIANT Program

Life sciences Medical research Antarctic krill (Euphausia superba) vascular and lipid characteristics Modification of collagen disease and atheroma in rabbits by adding krill to their diet Ornithological observations in Fildes Peninsula (King George Island), South Bay (Livingston Island), and Harmony Point (Nelson Island), South Shetland Islands Behavioral studies in a penguin colony in the South Shetland Islands

Logistics: Are provided by the National Defense Ministry (of which the Uruguayan Antarctic Institute is a part) and the armed forces (army, navy, and air force), which also contribute to scientific programs.

Transport methods include Hercules C-130B airplanes, Bell 212 helicopters, Navy Ships and other seaborne units, amphibious vehicles, and various land vehicles.

Uruguayan Antarctic research is generally proportional to overall national efforts, although there is a special emphasis on life sciences and those related to changes in the environment.

Uruguay is particularly mindful of environmental matters and abides by all agreements and treaties pertinent to the Antarctic, so develops continuous environment monitoring programs complementing the impact assessments of its activities.

== General information ==
=== Location of base ===
- South Shetlands, KGI, Fildes Peninsula
- Lat: 62°11'04"S Long: 58°54'14"W
- 17 m above sea level
- Ice free surface
- 100 meters from the Antarctic coastline
- Bellingshausen Station nearest base
- Ushuaia (1000 km) nearest port

=== Major dates ===
- Station opened 22 December 1984
- Breaks in operation:22/12/84

=== Population ===
- 60 persons capacity
- 20 average summer population
- 8 average winter population

=== Additional notes ===
Around 10 scientists in summer, 6 crew for helicopter, 3-5 for maintenance, 4 servicemen.

== Science activities ==
The following science activities are carried out at Base Cientifica Antárctica Artigas:

- Environmental monitoring (since 1998)
- Geodesy/mapping (since 1986)
- Glaciology - continental (since 1991)
- Human biology (since 1985)
- Ionospheric/auroral observations (since 1992)
- Meteorological observations (since 1984)
- Stratospheric ozone monitoring (since 1998)
- Tide measurement (since 1989)

== Observations and scientific programs ==
=== Station infrastructure ===
Area and buildings

- 24000 total station area
- 13 buildings

=== Power and fuel supply ===
- 220 V 60 Hz power supply
- 375 kVA power generation capacity
- 3 generators
- Generators fuelled with winter blend fuel
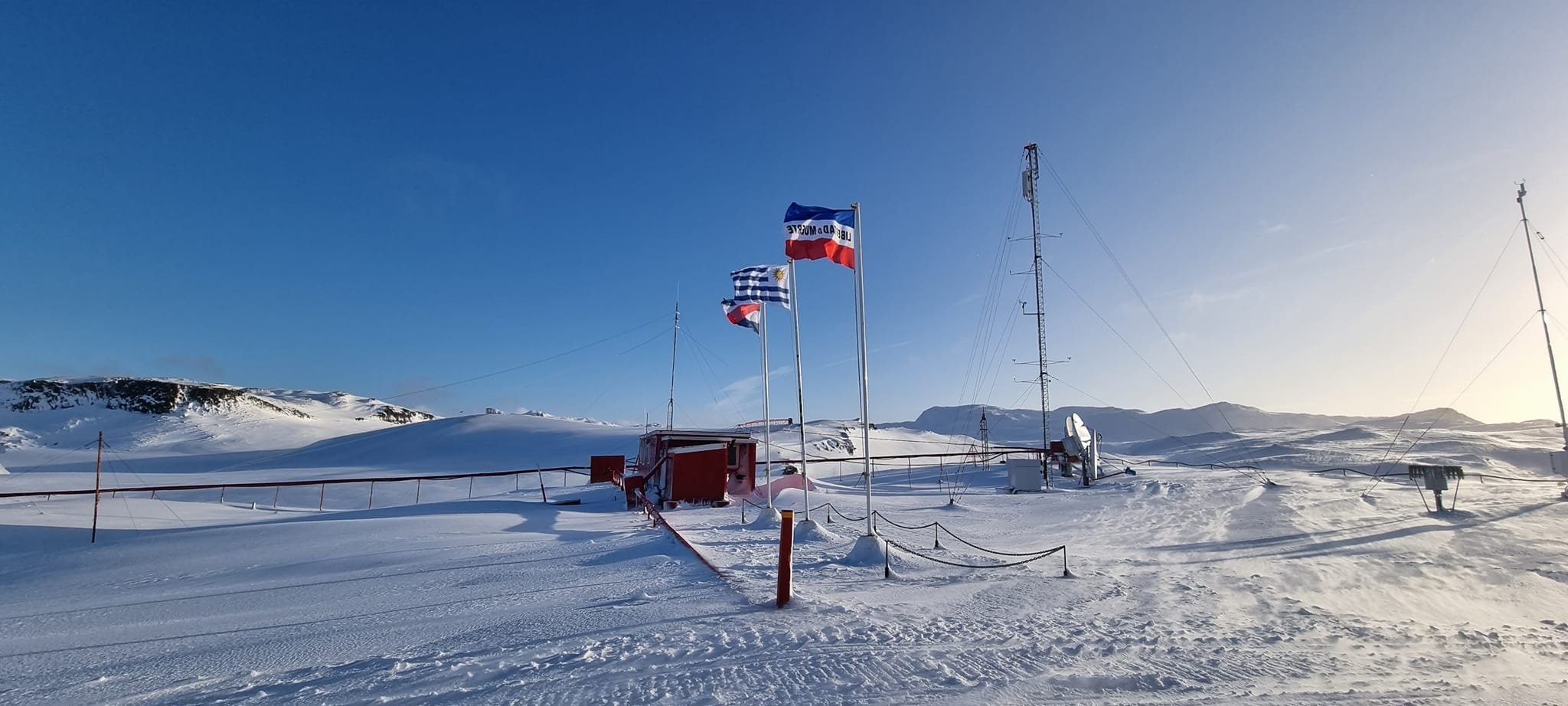
- Flags of Uruguay in the base.
  160.000 lts of fuel used annually
- none wind generator

=== Water and sewage ===
- Potable water supply source/method:Lake
- 876000 of water used each year

=== Medical facilities ===
- Base Cientifica Antárctica Artigas has the following medical facilities:
  - 30 sqm medical suite
  - 1 doctor
  - 0 paramedic(s)
  - 2 beds for patients
  - MEDEVAC & Fire Plan updated and exercised

== Logistic support ==
- Ice
  - Ice breakout: October
  - Fast ice formation: late May
- Shipping
  - 1 ship visit(s) per season
  - 1 resupply visit(s) per season (in January)
  - 300 m from station to anchorage
  - 30 m deep anchorage
- Air transport
  - 7 intercontinental flights per season
  - Aircraft used: Hercules C-130
  - Light aircraft/helicopter available December–March
  - Types used: Bell r Helicopter airstrip surface
  - at base from station to airstrip
- Other support transport
  - Tracked personnel carriers: 2x Hagglunds
  - Snowmobiles: 1x snowmobile
  - Rough terrain quads/tricycles: 1x quad
  - Outboard watercraft: 2x zodiacs
- Trucks
  - 1xIFA
- Tractors, loaders, excavators
  - Wheeled tractor(s): 1 massey ferguson

== See also ==
- Elichiribehety Base, the second uruguayan antarctic base.
- List of Antarctic research stations
- List of Antarctic field camps
