= Research stations in Antarctica =

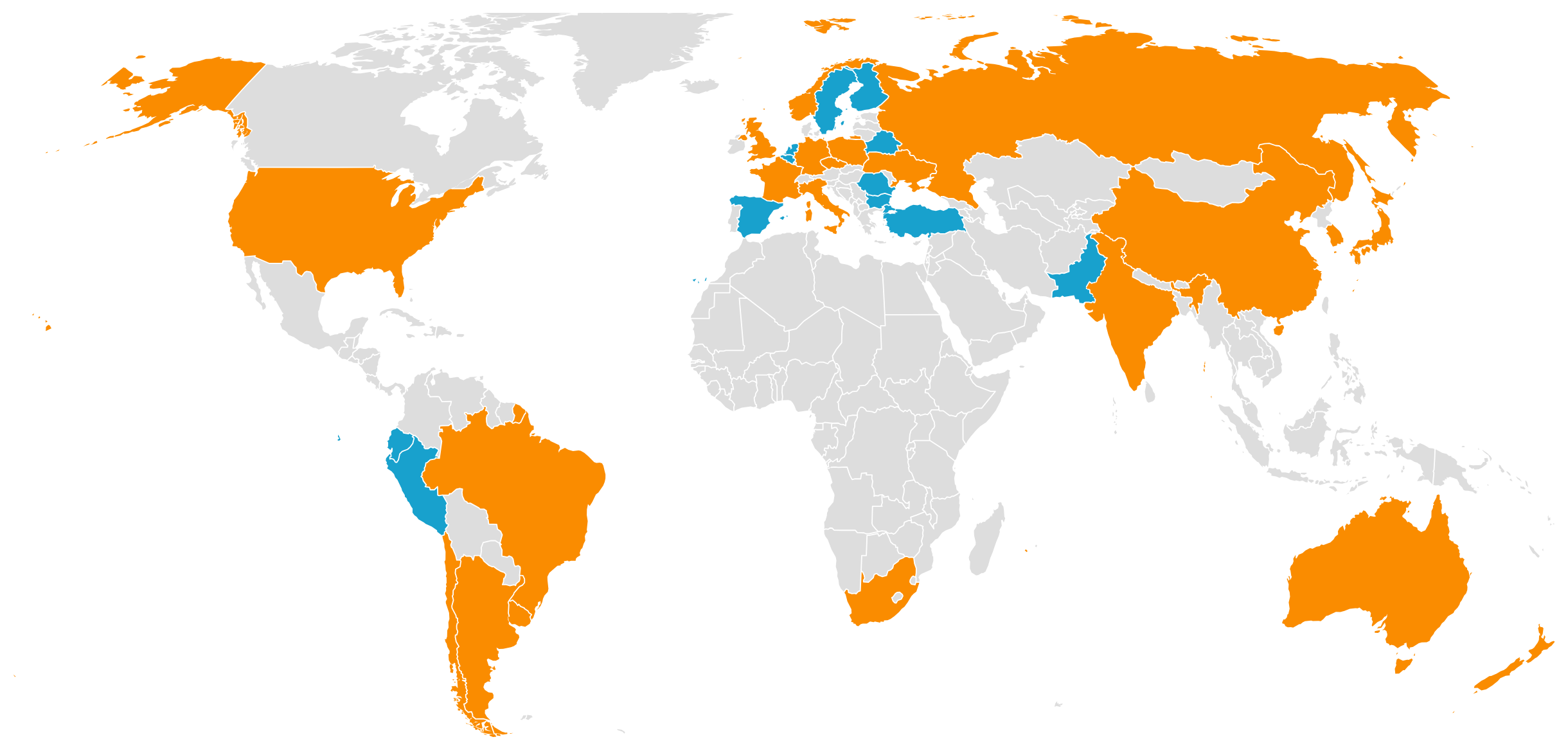
Countries with research stations in Antarctica. Countries with permanent stations (orange), countries with summer-only stations (blue).

Multiple governments have set up permanent research stations in Antarctica and these bases are widely distributed. Unlike the drifting ice stations set up in the Arctic, the current research stations of the Antarctic are constructed either on rocks or on ice that are (for practical purposes) fixed in place.

Many of these stations are staffed throughout the year. Of the 56 signatories to the Antarctic Treaty, a total of 55 countries (as of 2023) operate seasonal (summer) and year-round research stations on the continent. The number of people performing and supporting scientific research on the continent and nearby islands varies from approximately 4,800 during the summer to around 1,200 during the winter (June). In addition to these permanent stations, approximately 30 field camps are established each summer to support specific projects.

== History ==
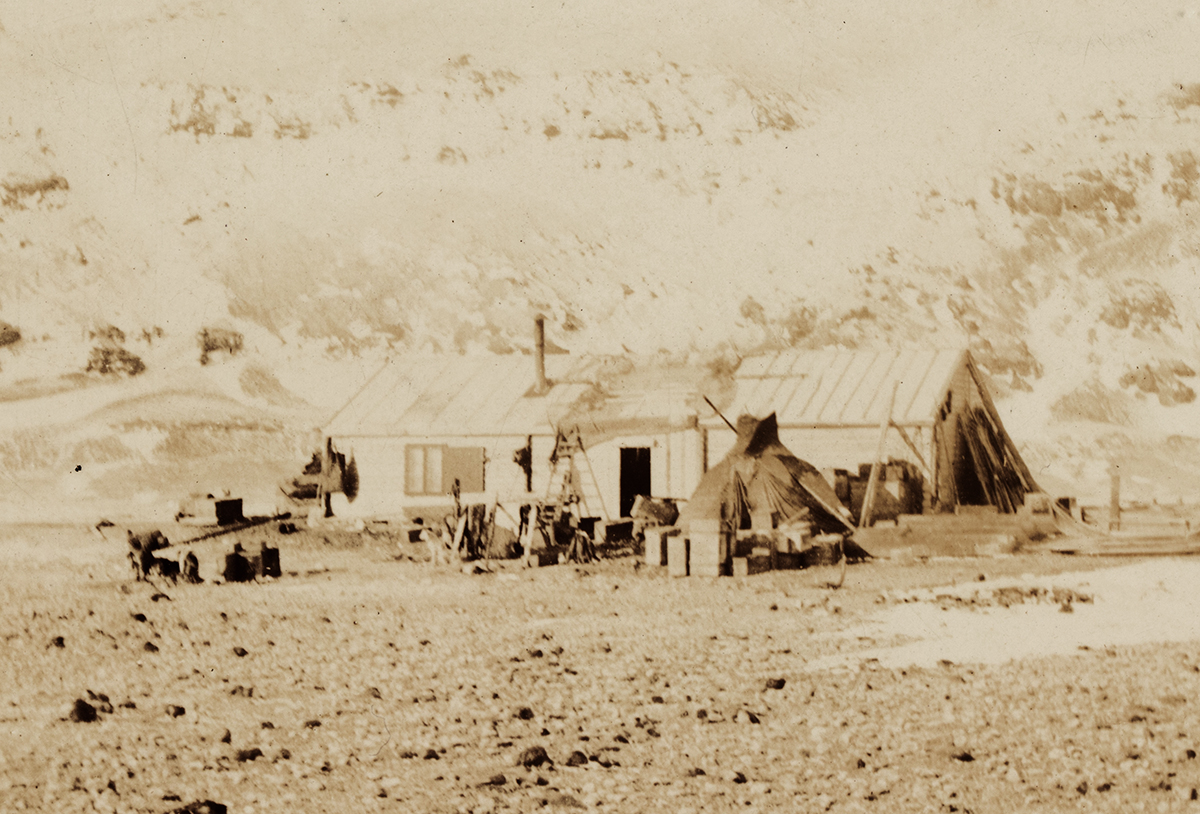
The first base on Antarctica of Carstens Borchgrevink's Southern Cross Expedition (1899). The hut (HSM 22) still stands and is located on Cape Adare, the cape where in 1895 Borchgrevnik participated in the first documented landing on Antarctica.

=== First bases ===
During the Heroic Age of Antarctic Exploration in the late 19th century, the first bases on the continent were established. In 1898, Carsten Borchgrevink, a Norwegian/British explorer, led the British Antarctic Expedition to Cape Adare, where he established the first Antarctic base on Ridley Beach. This expedition is often referred to now as the Southern Cross Expedition, after the expedition's ship name. Most of the staff were Norwegian, but the funds for the expedition were British, provided by Sir George Newnes. The 10 members of this expedition explored Robertson Bay to the west of Cape Adare by dog teams, and later, after being picked up by the ship at the base, went ashore on the Ross Ice Shelf for brief journeys. The expedition hut is still in good condition and is visited frequently by tourists.

The hut was later occupied by Scott's Northern Party under the command of Victor Campbell for a year in 1911, after its attempt to explore the eastern end of the ice shelf discovered Roald Amundsen already ashore preparing for his assault on the South Pole.

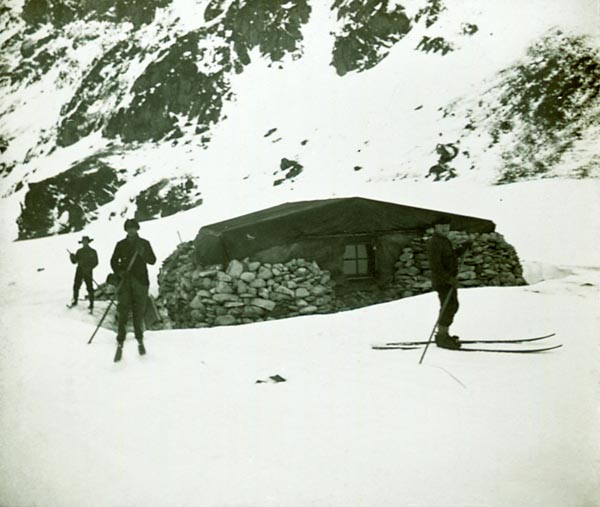
"Omond House", the oldest permanent base on an Antarctic island, constructed in 1903 by the Scottish National Antarctic Expedition, which is today Orcadas Base

In 1903, William S. Bruce's Scottish National Antarctic Expedition set off to Antarctica, with one of its aims to establish a meteorological station in the area. After the expedition failed to find land, Bruce decided to head back to Laurie Island in the South Orkneys and find an anchorage there. The islands were well-situated as a site for a meteorological station, and their relative proximity to the South American mainland allowed a permanent station to be established. Bruce instituted a comprehensive program of work, involving meteorological readings, trawling for marine samples, botanical excursions, and the collection of biological and geological specimens.

The major task completed during this time was the construction of a stone building, christened "Omond House". This was to act as living accommodation for the parties that would remain on Laurie Island to operate the proposed meteorological laboratory. The building was constructed from local materials using the dry stone method, with a roof improvised from wood and canvas sheeting. The completed house was 20 feet by 20 feet square (6m × 6m), with two windows, fitted as quarters for six people. Rudmose Brown wrote: "Considering that we had no mortar and no masons' tools it is a wonderfully fine house and very lasting. I should think it will be standing a century hence ..."

Bruce later offered to transfer the station and instruments to Argentina on the condition that the government committed itself to the continuation of the scientific mission. Bruce informed the British officer William Haggard of his intentions in December 1903, and Haggard ratified the terms of Bruce's proposition.

The Scotia sailed back for Laurie Island on 14 January 1904, transporting Argentinean officials from the Ministry of Agriculture, National Meteorological Office, Ministry of Livestock and National Postal and Telegraphs Office. In 1906, Argentina communicated to the international community the establishment of a permanent base on the South Orkney Islands.

=== Expansion ===
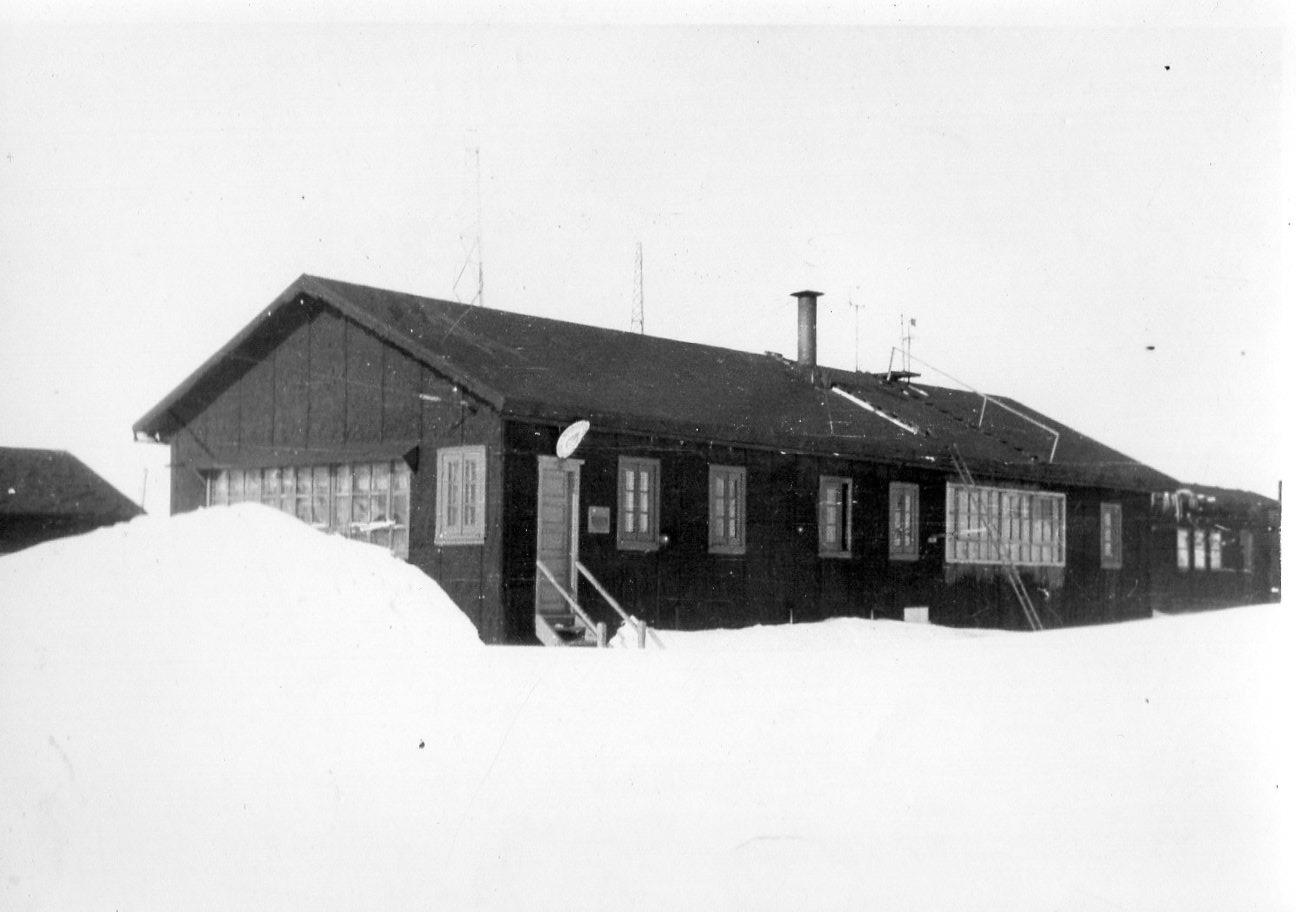
Orcadas Base, c. 1927

Little happened for the following forty years.

The United States starting under the leadership of Admiral Richard E. Byrd constructed a series of five bases near the Bay of Whales named Little America between 1929 and 1958. All of them have now drifted off to sea on icebergs.

Before the start of the Second World War, German aircraft had dropped markers with swastikas across Queen Maud Land in an attempt to create a territorial claim (New Swabia).

In 1943 the British launched Operation Tabarin, to establish a presence on the continent. The chief reason was to establish solid British claims to various uninhabited islands and parts of Antarctica, reinforced by Argentine sympathies toward Germany.

Led by Lieutenant James Marr, the 14-strong team left the Falkland Islands in two ships, HMS William Scoresby (a minesweeping trawler) and HMS Fitzroy, on Saturday, January 29, 1944. Marr had accompanied the British explorer Sir Ernest Shackleton on his final Antarctic expedition in 1921–22. Bases were established during February near the abandoned Norwegian whaling station on Deception Island, where the Union Flag was hoisted in place of Argentine flags, and at Port Lockroy (on February 11) on the coast of Graham Land. A further base was founded at Hope Bay on February 13, 1945, after a failed attempt to unload stores on February 7, 1944. These were the first permanent bases to be constructed on the Antarctic mainland.

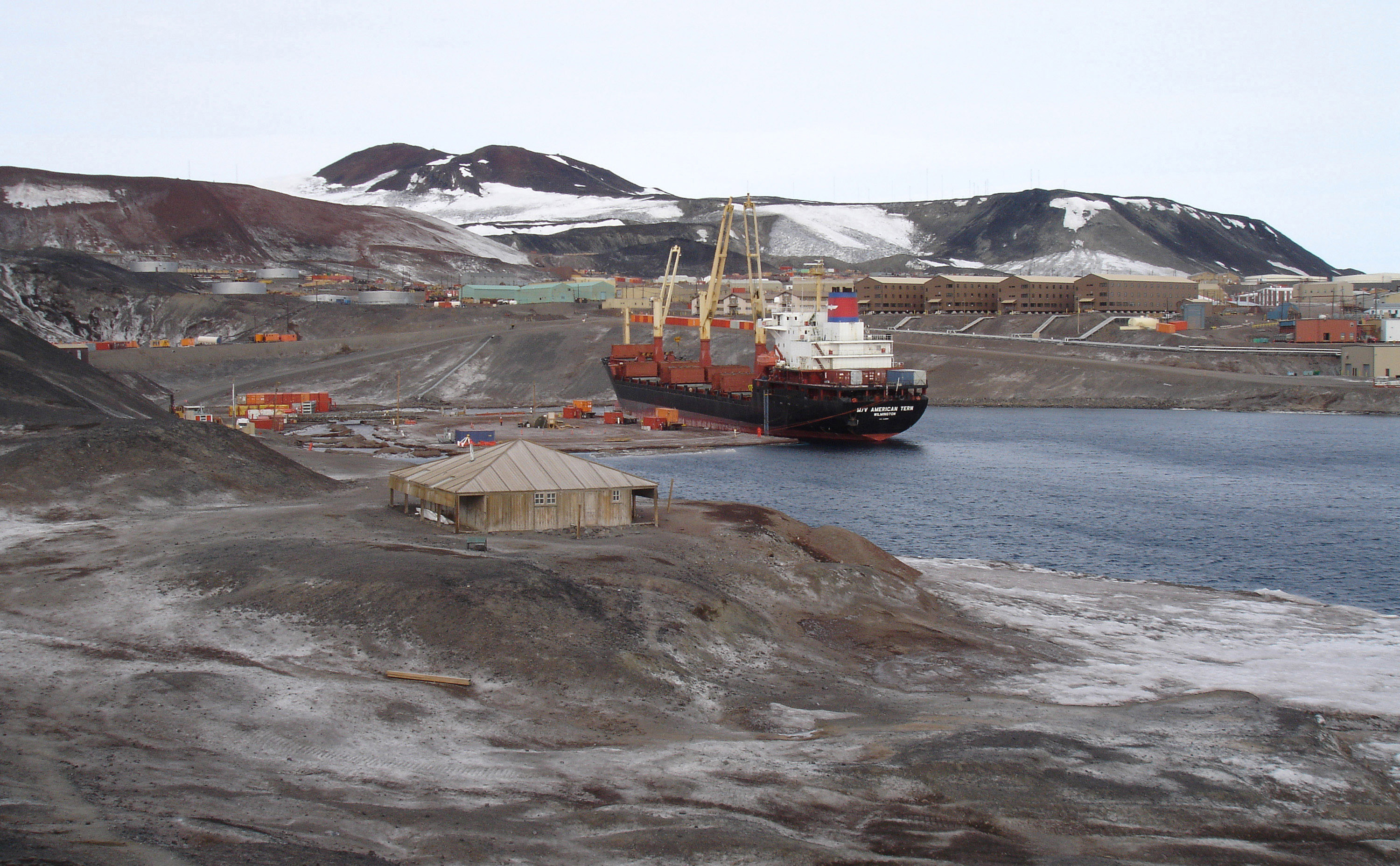
Discovery Hut (1902) at Hut Point Peninsula of Ross Island, Antarctica, one of the earliest repeatedly temporarily used dwellings on Antarctica. In the background, McMurdo Station, the largest on Antarctica today, with cargo operations of the supply ship MV American Tern of Operation Deep Freeze 2007.

A massive expansion in international activity followed the war. Chile organized its First Chilean Antarctic Expedition in 1947–48. Among other accomplishments, it brought the Chilean president Gabriel González Videla to personally inaugurate one of its bases, thereby becoming the first head of state to set foot on the continent. Signy Research Station (UK) was established in 1947, Australia's Mawson Station in 1954, Dumont d'Urville Station was the first French station in 1956. In that same year, the United States built McMurdo Station and Amundsen–Scott South Pole Station, and the Soviet Union built Mirny Station.

=== The Antarctic Treaty ===
The Antarctic Treaty, first signed on 1 December 1959 by 12 countries, stated that scientific investigations in research stations in Antarctica can continue, but all observations must be shared. The Antarctic Treaty also stated that Antarctica can only be used for peaceful purposes and any exploitation of the continent such as mining is forbidden, thus scientific research is the only activity that may be performed on Antarctica. As more countries established research stations on Antarctica, the number of signatories of the treaty increased, with 56 signatories as of 2023, 55 of whom utilize their rights and operate research stations in Antarctica. 7 of the signatories also laid claims on Antarctica (and 4 reserved their rights to do so), with the intention of expanding research in those territories in the future. However, research facilities have also been established by countries in the claimed area of other countries.

== Permanent active stations ==
The percentage of the summer Antarctic population (formed by Antarctic and Subantarctic research stations) each country makes up.
1. United States (28.1%)
2. Argentina (12.1%)
3. Chile (8.71%)
4. United Kingdom (3.95%)
5. France (3.89%)
6. Australia (3.79%)
7. Russia (6.74%)
8. Japan (2.67%)
9. China (3.45%)
10. Italy (3.22%)
11. South Africa (2.86%)
12. South Korea (2.70%)
13. India (1.27%)
14. Germany (1.15%)
15. New Zealand (1.62%)
16. Spain (1.25%)
17. Norway (1.21%)
18. Other (11.3%)

The United States maintains the southernmost base, Amundsen–Scott South Pole Station, and the largest base and research station in Antarctica, McMurdo Station. The second-southernmost base is the Chinese Kunlun Station at 80°25′2″S during the summer season, and the Russian Vostok Station at 78°27′50″S during the winter season.

Name	Location	Country	Administration	Year est.	Max. pers.	Summer pop.	Winter pop.	UTC offset	Mean annual temp. (°C)
Amundsen–Scott South Pole	Geographical South Pole	United States	United States Antarctic Program	1957	153	150	49	+12 (Note: Observes daylight saving time.)	−49.5
Arctowski	King George Island	Poland	Polish Academy of Sciences	1977	40	40	16	−3	−1.6
Artigas	King George Island	Uruguay	Uruguayan Antarctic Institute	1984	62	40	8	−3	−0.9
Arturo Prat	Greenwich Island	Chile	Chilean Navy	1947	30	30	8	−3	−2.0
Belgrano II	Coats Land	Argentina	Instituto Antartico Argentino	1979	20	24	19	−3	−13.3
Bellingshausen	King George Island	Russia	Russian Antarctic Expedition	1968	40	40	20	−3	−2.3
Bharati	Larsemann Hills	India	National Centre for Polar and Ocean Research	2012	47	46	23	+5:30	−10.2
Carlini	King George Island	Argentina	Instituto Antartico Argentino	1953	80	80	29	−3	−1.6
Casey	Vincennes Bay	Australia	Australian Antarctic Division	1957	99	99	21	+8	−5.9
Comandante Ferraz	King George Island	Brazil	Brazilian Antarctic Program	1984	64	35	15	−3	−1.8
Concordia	Dome C, Antarctic Plateau	Italy; France	National Antarctic Research Program, IPEV	2005	80	70	13	+8	−51.7
Davis	Princess Elizabeth Land	Australia	Australian Antarctic Division	1957	91	91	17	+7	−7.3
Dumont d'Urville	Adélie Land	France	IPEV	1956	90	90	24	+10	−11.1
Eco-Nelson	Nelson Island	Czech Republic	Czech Antarctic Foundation	1988	8	5	5	−3	−2.3
Eduardo Frei and Villa Las Estrellas	King George Island	Chile	Chilean Air Force	1969	150	150	80	−3	−2.3
Escudero	King George Island	Chile	Instituto Antártico Chileno	1995	90	60	2	−3	−2.3
Esperanza	Hope Bay	Argentina	Instituto Antartico Argentino	1953	90	116	56	−3	−4.6
GARS	Cape Legoupil	Germany	German Aerospace Center	1991	10			-3	−3.9
General Bernardo O'Higgins	Cape Legoupil	Chile	Chilean Army	1948	60	52	24	−3	−3.9
Great Wall	King George Island	China	Polar Research Institute of China	1985	60	60	13	−3	−2.5
Halley	Brunt Ice Shelf	United Kingdom	British Antarctic Survey	2013	52	70	17	−3	−18.5
Jang Bogo	Terra Nova Bay	South Korea	Korea Polar Research Institute	2014	62	62	23	+11	−15.1
King Sejong	King George Island	South Korea	Korea Polar Research Institute	1988	68	68	22	−3	−1.8
Maitri	Schirmacher Oasis	India	National Centre for Polar and Ocean Research	1989	65	45	25	+5:30	−9.7
Marambio	Marambio Island	Argentina	Instituto Antartico Argentino	1969	165	165	70	−3	−8.1
Mawson	Mac Robertson Land	Australia	Australian Antarctic Division	1954	53	53	15	+6	−8.3
McMurdo	Ross Island	United States	United States Antarctic Program	1956	1,200	1,000	153	+12	−17.3
Mirny	Davis Sea	Russia	Russian Antarctic Expedition	1956	50	50	25	+6	−11.3
Neumayer III	Atka Bay	Germany	Alfred Wegener Institute	2009	60	60	9	0	−16.0
Novolazarevskaya	Queen Maud Land	Russia	Russian Antarctic Expedition	1961	70	70	40	0	−10.3
Orcadas	Laurie Island, South Orkney Islands	Argentina	Instituto Antartico Argentino, Argentine Navy	1903	65	35	17	−3	−3.0
Palmer	Anvers Island	United States	United States Antarctic Program	1968	46	44	13	−3	−1.8
Petrel	Dundee Island	Argentina	Argentine Army, Argentine Navy	1967	25	25	25	−3	−7.1
Progress	Prydz Bay	Russia	Russian Antarctic Expedition	1988	50	50	25	−5	−9.4
Qinling	Inexpressible Island, Terra Nova Bay	China	Polar Research Institute of China	2024	80	80	30	+12	
Rothera	Adelaide Island	United Kingdom	British Antarctic Survey	1975	136	160	27	−3	−5.3
San Martín	Barry Island	Argentina	Instituto Antartico Argentino	1951 (Note: This base was closed in 1960 and reopened on 21 March 1976.)	21	19	21	−3	−4.6
SANAE IV	Vesleskarvet, Queen Maud Land	South Africa	South African National Antarctic Programme	1997	80	110	15	+2	−16.5
Scott Base	Ross Island	New Zealand	Antarctica New Zealand	1957	86	78	11	+12	−19.6
Showa	East Ongul Island	Japan	National Institute of Polar Research	1957	130	170	40	+3	−10.5
Troll	Queen Maud Land	Norway	Norwegian Polar Institute	1990	70	45	7	0	−18.0
Vernadsky	Galindez Island	Ukraine	National Antarctic Scientific Center of Ukraine	1994	24	30	12	−3	−3.3
Vostok	Antarctic Ice Sheet	Russia	Russian Antarctic Expedition	1957	30	30	15	+6	−55.2
Zhongshan	Larsemann Hills, Prydz Bay	China	Polar Research Institute of China	1989	60	60	17	+7	−11.2

=== Subantarctic stations ===
The sub-Antarctic zone is a physiographic region in the Southern Hemisphere, located immediately north of the Antarctic region.

Name	Location	Country	Administration	Year est.	Summer pop.	Winter pop.	UTC offset	Mean annual temp. (°C)
Alfred Faure	Île de la Possession	France	French Polar Institute	1963	45	24	+5	5.3
Bird	Bird Island	United Kingdom	British Antarctic Survey	1957	10	4	−2	−0.2
Campbell	Campbell Island	New Zealand	MetService	1946	0	0	+12	7.0
Gough	Gough Island	South Africa	South African Weather Service	1956	10	10	0	11.5
King Edward Point	King Edward Point	United Kingdom	British Antarctic Survey	1950	22	12	−2	1.6
Macquarie	Macquarie Island	Australia	Australian Antarctic Division	1911	40	16	+10	4.9
Marion	Prince Edward Islands	South Africa	South African National Antarctic Programme	1948	18	18	+3	5.5
Norvegia	Bouvet Island	Norway	Norwegian Polar Institute	1927	6	0		-1
Port-aux-Français	Kerguelen Islands	France	French Polar Institute	1963	120	45	+5	5.2

== Summer-only active stations ==
Name	Location	Country	Admin.	Year est.	Max. pers.	Summer pop.	UTC offset	Mean annual temp. (°C)
Aboa	Queen Maud Land	Finland	Finnish Antarctic Research Program	1988	17	13		−15.3
Brown	Paradise Harbor	Argentina	Instituto Antártico Argentino	1951	12	12	−3	−2.4
Cámara	Half Moon Island	Argentina	Instituto Antartico Argentino	1953	22	20	−3	−2.4
Carvajal	Adelaide Island	Chile	Instituto Antártico Chileno	1984	46	46		−9.8
Collins	Fildes Peninsula	Chile	Instituto Antártico Chileno	2006		6		
Dallmann	Carlini Station	Germany	Alfred Wegener Institute	1994	16	16		−2.4
Deception	Deception Island	Argentina	Instituto Antartico Argentino	1948	36	18	−3	−3.0
Dirck Gerritsz Laboratory	Rothera Station	Netherlands	British Antarctic Survey, Netherlands Polar Programme	2013	10	10		−5.0
Dobrowolski	Bunger Hills, Wilkes Land	Poland	Polish Academy of Sciences	1959	10	10		−9.1
Elichiribehety	Hope Bay	Uruguay	Uruguayan Antarctic Institute	1945	8	7		−4.8
Gabriel de Castilla	Deception Island	Spain	Spanish National Research Council	1989	36	33		−0.7
Gondwana	Transantarctic Mountains	Germany	Alfred Wegener Institute	1983				
González Videla	Waterboat Point, Graham Land	Chile	Chilean Air Force	1951	15	15		−6.7
Guillermo Mann	Cape Shirreff	Chile	Instituto Antártico Chileno	1991	8	8		0.4
Jinnah	Sør Rondane Mountains, Queen Maud Land	Pakistan	Pakistan Antarctic Programme	1991				
Juan Carlos I	South Bay, Livingston Island	Spain	Spanish National Research Council	1988	50	27	−3	−1.2
Julio Ripamonti	Ardley Island	Chile	Instituto Antártico Chileno	1982		4	-3	
Kohnen	Queen Maud Land	Germany	Alfred Wegener Institute	2001	28	6		−42.2
Kunlun	Dome A	China	Polar Research Institute of China	2009	26	26		−51.4
Law-Racoviță-Negoiță	Larsemann Hills, Princess Elizabeth Land	Romania	Romanian Polar Research Institute	1986		13		
Lenie	Admiralty Bay	United States	United States Antarctic Program	1985		2		
Machu Picchu	Admiralty Bay, King George Island	Peru	Instituto Antártico Peruano	1989	30	30		−2.1
Maldonado	Greenwich Island	Ecuador	Instituto Antártico Ecuatoriano	1990	34	32		
Matienzo	Graham Land	Argentina	Instituto Antartico Argentino	1961	12	12	−3	−5.0
Melchior	Melchior Islands	Argentina	Instituto Antartico Argentino	1947	15	12	−3	−2.9
Mendel	James Ross Island	Czech Republic	Masaryk University	2007	20	20		−6.8
Molodyozhnaya	Thala Hills, East Antarctica	Russia	Russian Antarctic Expedition	1962	15	15		−11.0
Petrel	Dundee Island	Argentina	Instituto Antartico Argentino	1967	45	25	−3	−7.1
Port Lockroy	Goudier Island	United Kingdom	United Kingdom Antarctic Heritage Trust	1944		4		
Primavera	Graham Land	Argentina	Instituto Antartico Argentino	1977	18	18	−3	−3.0
Princess Elisabeth	Queen Maud Land	Belgium	International Polar Foundation	2007	40	22		−18.0
Risopatrón	Robert Island	Chile	Instituto Antártico Chileno	1949		6		−2.3
Shirreff	Cape Shirreff	United States	National Oceanic and Atmospheric Administration	1996		6		
Signy	Signy Island, South Orkney Islands	United Kingdom	British Antarctic Survey	1947	8	14		−2.1
Sobral	Filchner-Ronne Ice Shelf	Argentina	Instituto Antártico Argentino	1965	7	6	−3	
St. Kliment Ohridski	Emona Anchorage, Livingston Island	Bulgaria	Bulgarian Antarctic Institute	1988	22	22	−3	−1.0
Svea	Queen Maud Land	Sweden	Swedish Polar Research Secretariat	1988		5		
Taishan	Princess Elizabeth Land	China	Polar Research Institute of China	2014	20	20		−30.3
TARS	Horseshoe Island	Turkey	Turkish Polar Research Program	2019	50	26		
Tor	Queen Maud Land	Norway	Norwegian Polar Institute	1993		7		
Union Glacier	Union Glacier	Chile	Chilean Army, Chilean Navy, Chilean Air Force, Instituto Antártico Chileno	2014		70	−3	
Vechernyaya	Mount Vechernyaya, Thala Hills	Belarus	National Academy of Sciences of Belarus	2007	7	7		
Wasa	Queen Maud Land	Sweden	Swedish Polar Research Secretariat	1989	20	13		−15.3
Yelcho	South Bay, Doumer Island	Chile	Instituto Antártico Chileno	1962	28	28		2.0
Zucchelli	Terra Nova Bay	Italy	National Antarctic Research Program, ENEA, CNR	1986	120	120	+12	−14.0

== Maps of active stations ==
Active research stations in Antarctica, except the Antarctic Peninsula. Red squares represent summer-only stations.
Active research stations on the Antarctic Peninsula, except the South Shetland Islands. Red squares represent summer-only stations.
Active research stations in the South Shetland Islands. Red squares represent summer-only stations.

== Inactive stations ==
Name	Location	Country	Admin.	Year est.	Type	UTC offset	Mean annual temp. (°C)	Year closed	Status
Aguirre Cerda	Deception Island	Chile	Instituto Antártico Chileno	1955	Summer			1967	Destroyed
Arturo Parodi	Ellsworth Land	Chile	Instituto Antártico Chileno	1999	Summer			2014	Dismantled
Asuka	Queen Maud Land	Japan	National Institute of Polar Research	1985	Summer			1992	Closed, under snow
Belgrano I	Filchner-Ronne Ice Shelf	Argentina	Instituto Antártico Argentino	1955	Permanent	−3		1980	Abandoned, lost
Belgrano III	Berkner Island	Argentina	Instituto Antártico Argentino	1980	Permanent	−3		1984	Abandoned
Borga	Borg Massif	South Africa	South African National Antarctic Programme	1969	Summer			1976	Closed
Brockton	Ross Ice Shelf	United States	United States Navy	1965	Summer			1972	Abandoned
Byrd	Marie Byrd Land	United States	United States Antarctic Program	1957	Summer		−28.1	2005	Abandoned
Charcot	Adélie Land	France	French Polar Institute	1957	Permanent			1959	Closed, abandoned
Corbeta Uruguay	Thule Island	Argentina	Argentine Navy	1977	Permanent	-2	−4.4	1982	Closed, Abandoned, Destroyed
Dakshin Gangotri	Dakshin Gangotri Glacier	India	National Centre for Polar and Ocean Research	1984	Permanent			1990	Closed, support base
Dome Fuji	Queen Maud Land	Japan	National Institute of Polar Research	1995	Summer		−54.3	2019	Closed
Drescher	Queen Maud Land	Germany	Alfred Wegener Institute	1986	Summer			2016	Closed
Druzhba	Zavadovskiy Island	Soviet Union	Soviet Antarctic Expedition	1960	Winter			1960	Closed
Druzhnaya I	Filchner-Ronne Ice Shelf	Soviet Union	Soviet Antarctic Expedition	1975	Summer			1986	Closed, lost
Druzhnaya II	Lassiter Coast	Soviet Union	Soviet Antarctic Expedition	1982	Summer			1986	Closed
Druzhnaya III	Queen Maud Land	Soviet Union	Soviet Antarctic Expedition	1982	Summer			1991	Closed
Druzhnaya IV	Princess Elizabeth Land	Russia	Russian Antarctic Expedition	1987	Summer			2013	Closed
East Base	Stonington Island	United States	United States Antarctic Service Expedition	1941	Permanent			1948	Closed
Eights	Ellsworth Land	United States	National Science Foundation	1963	Permanent			1965	Closed
Ellsworth	Filchner-Ronne Ice Shelf	United States; Argentina	United States Navy, Instituto Antártico Argentino	1957	Permanent		−22	1962	Closed, lost
Destacamento naval Esperanza	Hope Bay	Argentina	Argentine Navy	1952	Permanent	-3		1958	Closed, destroyed in a fire, became Esperanza Base
Faraday	Galindez Island	United Kingdom	British Antarctic Survey	1947	Permanent		−3.3	1996	Closed, became Vernadsky
Filchner	Filchner-Ronne Ice Shelf	Germany	Alfred Wegener Institute	1982	Summer			1999	Abandoned, lost
Georg Forster	Filchner-Ronne Ice Shelf	Germany	Alfred Wegener Institute	1976	Permanent			1993	Dismantled
Georg von Neumayer	Princess Martha Coast	Germany	Alfred Wegener Institute	1981	Permanent			1993	Closed, sunk in ice
Giacomo Bove	Italia Valley	Italy	Renato Cepparo Expedition	1976	Summer			1976	Closed, sabotaged
Hallett	Hallett Peninsula	United States; New Zealand	International Geophysical Year	1956	Summer			1973	Dismantled
King Baudouin	Princess Ragnhild Coast	Belgium; Netherlands	National Center for Polar Research	1958	Permanent			1967	Closed, abandoned
Komsomolskaya	Queen Mary Land	Soviet Union	Arctic and Antarctic Research Institute	1957	Permanent		−52	1962	Abandoned
Lazarev	Lazarev Ice Shelf	Soviet Union	Soviet Antarctic Expedition	1959	Permanent			1961	Closed, abandoned
Leningradskaya	Oates Coast, Victoria Land	Russia	Russian Antarctic Expedition	1971	Summer		−14.2	2008	Closed
Little America	Ross Ice Shelf	United States	United States Navy	1929	Permanent		−22	1987	Lost
Little Rockford	Marie Byrd Land	United States	United States Navy	1958	Summer			1965	Closed, abandoned
Maudheim	Queen Maud Land	Norway; Sweden; United Kingdom	Norwegian–British–Swedish Antarctic Expedition	1950	Permanent			1952	Closed
Mir	Drygalski Island	Soviet Union	Soviet Antarctic Expedition	1960	Winter			1960	Closed
Mizuho	Mizuho Plateau	Japan	National Institute of Polar Research	1970	Summer			1987	Closed
Neumayer II	Queen Maud Land	Germany	Alfred Wegener Institute	1992	Permanent			2009	Dismantled
Norway	Fimbul Ice Shelf	Norway; South Africa	Sixth Norwegian Antarctic Expedition	1957	Permanent			1960	Closed
Oazis 2	Bunger Hills	Russia	Russian Antarctic Expedition	1987	Summer			1995	Closed
Pionérskaya	Queen Mary Land	Soviet Union	Soviet Antarctic Expedition	1956	Permanent		−38	1959	Closed
Plateau	Queen Maud Land	United States	United States Navy, National Science Foundation	1965	Permanent		−56.7	1969	Closed
Pobeda	Queen Mary Land	Soviet Union	Soviet Antarctic Expedition	1960	Summer			1960	Abandoned, lost
Pole of Inaccessibility	Kemp Land	Soviet Union	Soviet Antarctic Expedition	1958	Summer		−58.2	1958	Closed
Port Martin	Cape Margerie	France	French Antarctic Expedition	1950	Permanent			1952	Partly destroyed in a fire, closed
Russkaya	Marie Byrd Land	Russia	Russian Antarctic Expedition	1980	Summer	−6	−12.4	1990	Closed
SANAE I	Fimbul Ice Shelf	South Africa	South African National Antarctic Programme	1960	Permanent			1963	Closed, abandoned
SANAE II	Fimbul Ice Shelf	South Africa	South African National Antarctic Programme	1971	Permanent			1979	Closed, abandoned
SANAE III	Fimbul Ice Shelf	South Africa	South African National Antarctic Programme	1979	Permanent			1997	Closed, abandoned
Sarie Marais	Ahlmann Ridge	South Africa	South African National Antarctic Programme	1982	Summer			2001	Closed, decommissioned
Siple	Ellsworth Land	United States	Stanford University's STAR Lab	1973	Summer			1988	Closed
Sobral	Filchner–Ronne Ice Shelf	Argentina	Argentine Army	1965	Permanent	-3	−60	1983	Abandoned
Sodruzhestvo	Amery Ice Shelf	Soviet Union	Soviet Antarctic Expedition	1971	Summer			1974	Closed
Sovetskaya	Kaiser Wilhelm II Land	Soviet Union	Arctic and Antarctic Research Institute	1958	Permanent			1959	Closed, abandoned
Soyuz	Prince Charles Mountains	Soviet Union	Soviet Antarctic Expedition	1982	Permanent	+5		2007	Closed
Station B	Deception Island	United Kingdom	Falkland Islands and Dependencies Aerial Survey Expedition	1944	Permanent			1969	Closed, abandoned
Station C	Cape Geddes	United Kingdom	British Antarctic Survey	1946	Summer			1947	Closed, abandoned
Station D	Hope Bay	United Kingdom	British Antarctic Survey	1945	Permanent			1964	Closed, became ECARE
Station E	Stonington Island	United Kingdom	British Antarctic Survey	1946	Permanent			1975	Closed
Station G	Admiralty Bay	United Kingdom	British Antarctic Survey	1947	Permanent			1961	Closed, demolished
Station J	Prospect Point	United Kingdom	British Antarctic Survey	1957	Permanent			1959	Closed, removed
Station N	Anvers Island	United Kingdom	British Antarctic Survey	1955	Permanent			1971	Destroyed in a fire, demolished
Station O	Danco Island	United Kingdom	British Antarctic Survey	1956	Permanent			1959	Closed, demolished
Station T	Adelaide Island	United Kingdom	British Antarctic Survey	1961	Permanent			1977	Closed, became Carvajal
Station V	View Point	United Kingdom	British Antarctic Survey	1953	Permanent			1963	Closed, became Jorge Boonen
Station W	Detaille Island	United Kingdom	British Antarctic Survey	1956	Permanent			1959	Closed
Station Y	Horseshoe Island	United Kingdom	British Antarctic Survey	1955	Permanent			1960	Closed
Vanda	Victoria Land	New Zealand	Antarctica New Zealand	1969	Summer		−19.7	1995	Closed
Vostok I	East Antarctica	Soviet Union	Russian Academy of Sciences	1957	Permanent			1957	Closed, abandoned
Weddell 1	Weddell Sea	Russia; United States	Russian Antarctic Expedition, National Science Foundation	1992	Summer			1992	Evacuated
Wilkes	Clark Peninsula	United States; Australia	United States Navy; Australian Antarctic Division	1957	Permanent	+8		1969	Closed, partially abandoned (Note: Transmitter hut used as field hut and temporary accommodation for nearby Casey Station.)
World Park	Cape Evans	International	Greenpeace	1987	Permanent			1991	Dismantled

== Impact and pollution ==
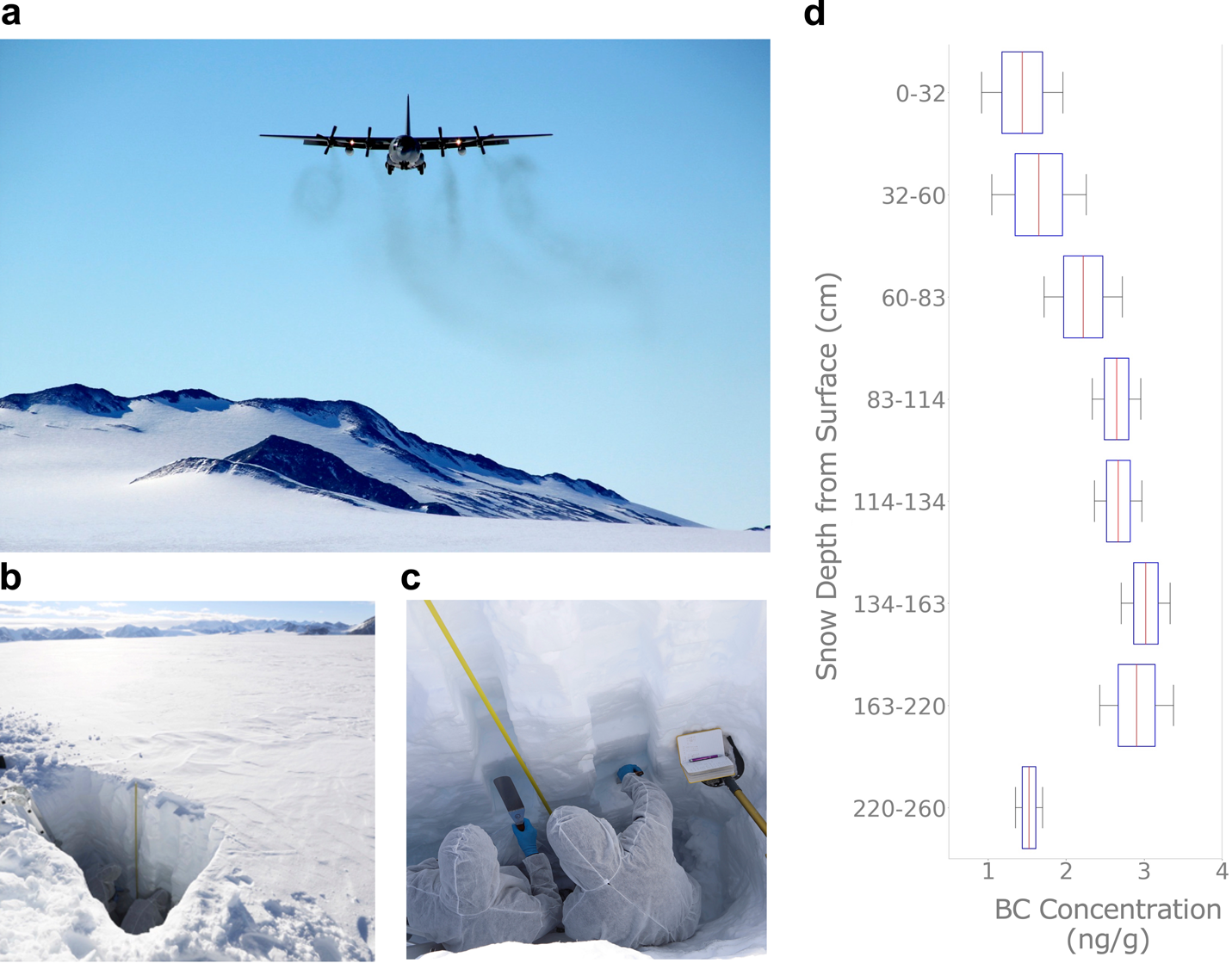
A C-130 airplane landing on an ice runway at Union Glacier (upper left), which causes black carbon concentrations to increase in the surrounding snow (right), as observed through sample collection (lower left)

In 2023 a research report from an Australian team found that the pollution left by international research stations was comparable to that seen in some of the busiest ports in the world.

== See also ==
- Antarctic field camps
- A Place Further than the Universe (animated television show set in Antarctica)
- Demographics of Antarctica
- Territorial claims in Antarctica
- List of airports in Antarctica
- List of research stations in the Arctic (for analogous stations in the Arctic)
- List of Antarctic expeditions
- Transport in Antarctica
- Time in Antarctica
- Winter-over syndrome
- Human outpost
