= Leningradskaya Station =

Leningradskaya Station Ленинградская
- Antarctic research station
- Location in Antarctica
- Coordinates: 69°30′05″S 159°23′30″E
- Region: Victoria Land
- Location: Near Oates Coast
- Established: 25 February 1971
- Closed: 2008

Government
  - Type: Administration
  - Body: Russian Antarctic Expedition
- Elevation: 300 m (980 ft)

Population
  - Summer: Up to 10
  - Winter: 0
- Active times: Every summer
- Website: aari.aq

Leningradskaya station (Russian: Ленинградская) was a Russian (formerly Soviet) Antarctic research station, located in the northern shore of Victoria Land, at the Oates Coast. It was opened on February 25, 1971 by the members of the 15th Soviet Antarctic Expedition. It closed in 1991, but during its lifetime was host to studies of meteorology, Earth magnetism, oceanology and glaciology.

In February 2006, Valeriy Lukin, the head of the Russian Antarctic Expedition (RAE), said:

There are plans to open the mothballed stations Molodyozhnaya, Leningradskaya and Russkaya in the 2007–2008 season. This will bring great benefits because these stations are located in the Pacific sector of Antarctica, which is poorly covered by scientific studies.

== See also ==
- List of Antarctic research stations
- List of Antarctic field camps
- Soviet Antarctic Expedition
