= Vechernyaya Base =

Vechernyaya Base Гара Вячэрняя
- Antarctic station
- Location of Vechernyaya Base in Antarctica
- Coordinates: 67°39′35″S 46°09′18″E
- Country: Belarus
- Established: October 2015
- Elevation: 95 m (312 ft)

Population
  - Summer: 7
  - Winter: 0
- Type: Seasonal
- Period: Summer
- Website: belpolus.by/en/belorusskaya-antarkticheskaya-stantsiya/

Gora Vechernyaya Base (Belarusian: Гара Вячэрняя, Russian: Гора Вечерняя, lit. 'Evening Mount') is a summer Belarusian Antarctic scientific research station located in the Vechernyaya Mountain area, on the coast of the Cosmonauts Sea, 28 km from the seasonal Russian Molodyozhnaya Station, built next to the preserved modules of a former annex of that station. It is administered by the National Academy of Sciences of Belarus (NASB).

== Development ==
On March 15, 2013, a cooperation agreement between Belarus and Russia was signed allowing Belarus to use part of the Russian Molodyozhnaya station located on Vechernyaya Mountain, as well as Russian water and air transport. A working group on the Antarctic was also created, which meets twice a year: in the summer in Belarus and in the autumn in Russia.

In September 2015, at the XVII meeting of the Council of Managers of National Antarctic Programs in Norway, Belarus unanimously became the 30th permanent member of the council.

== Current status ==
The station consists of six men: geophysicist Maksim Garbatsevich, mechanical engineer Aleksei Zakhvatov, doctor Leonid Nikityuk, leader Aleksey Gaidashov and others. Except for the leader, all other members are in Antarctica for the first time.

On January 25, 2018, three new facilities were announced, including a scientific laboratory and living quarters, and the keys were handed to the members of the 10th expedition, Alyaksei Zakhvatav, Maksim Garbatsevich and Artur Ivashko.

In early December 2018, the 11th expedition delivered about 100 tons of cargo for the development of the station. The main task of the expedition was the development of the infrastructure of the station.

On August 10, 2020, during the 12th expedition, the international Antarctic Treaty inspectors visited the station for the first time. They were impressed with what they saw and provided their official report to the government of Belarus and NASB.

== Scientific goals ==
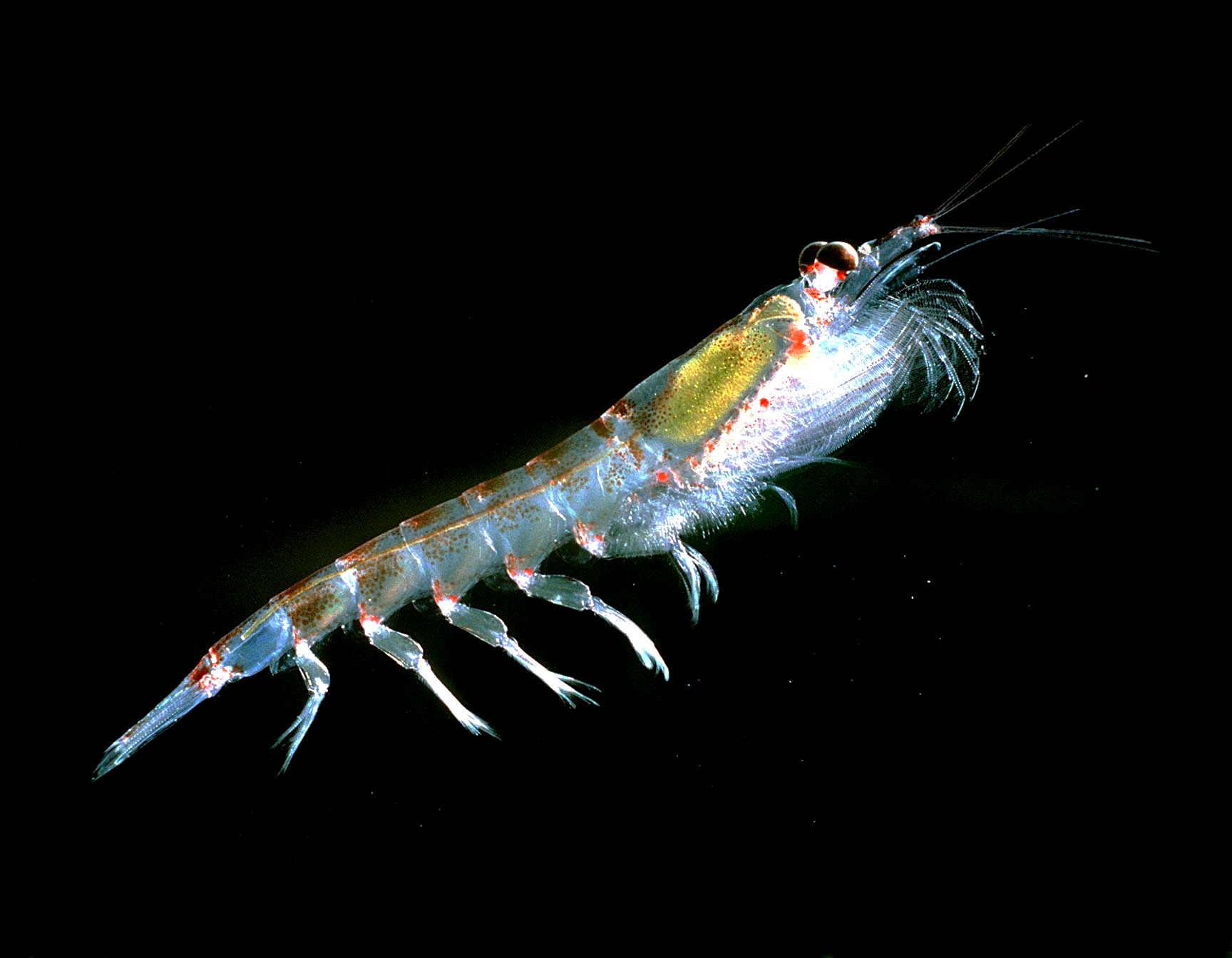
Antarctic krill

The station is designed to study the Earth's climate, in particular the state of the ozone layer and the gas and aerosol composition of the atmosphere. Belarusian scientists aim to test domestic devices for monitoring the atmosphere and ice formations. The station will help Belarusians to more accurately predict the weather in their latitudes.

A branch of research is studying microorganisms capable of surviving in extremely low temperatures that could have practical use in oncology, pharmacology and cosmetology. Belarusian biologists also aim to investigate Antarctic bacteria capable of processing oil to reduce oil pollution.

== Economic goals ==
To obtain a permit, a country must explore the waters adjacent to the chosen Antarctic mission and evaluate the bioproductivity of the area to justify the industrial activity for the UN. If the country does not have its own fleet, as is the case of Belarus, then it can transfer its rights to another country on a financial basis.
