= Russkaya Station =

Former Soviet and Russian Antarctic research station

Russkaya Station Русская
- Antarctic research station
- Location in Antarctica
- Coordinates: 74°45′59″S 136°48′10″W
- Region: Marie Byrd Land
- Location: Cape Burks
- Established: 9 March 1980
- Closed: 12 March 1990

Government
  - Type: Administration
  - Body: AARI, Russia
- Elevation: 126 m (413 ft)

Population
  - Summer: Up to 10
  - Winter: 0
- Time zone: UTC-6
- Active times: Some summers
- Website: aari.aq

The Russkaya Station (Russian: Русская) is a former Soviet and Russian Antarctic research station located on the Ruppert Coast, in Marie Byrd Land in Western Antarctica. The station was proposed in 1973 and approved in 1978. Construction began the next year and it was opened on March 9, 1980 and officially abandoned in 1990.

The station was mothballed in the beginning of 1990. In February 2006, Valeriy Lukin, the head of the Russian Antarctic Expedition (RAE), stated that "There are plans to open the mothballed stations Molodyozhnaya, Leningradskaya and Russkaya in the 2007–2008 season". However, by 2012 it was reported that reactivation plans, although delayed, had not commenced.

== Climate ==
For the shore of Antarctica, the winds are considered to be rather strong. The average number of days per year with wind speeds of over 15 metres per second (49 ft/s) in the area around the station is 264, and on 136 of those the wind speed is over 30 metres per second (98 ft/s). The average temperature in the coldest months of July–August is −20 °C (−4 °F); in the warmest months of December–January it is −2 °C (28 °F). The lowest temperature ever recorded at the station was −46.4 °C (−51.5 °F) in 1985, and the warmest was 7.4 °C (45.3 °F) in 1983. The average overall temperature over the course of a year is −12 °C (10 °F), and the average amount of snowfall is around 166 millimetres (6.5 in).

== See also ==
- List of Antarctic research stations
- List of Antarctic field camps
- Soviet Antarctic Expedition
- Crime in Antarctica
