= Drescher Ice Camp =

Drescher Ice Camp Drescher-Station
- Antarctic research station
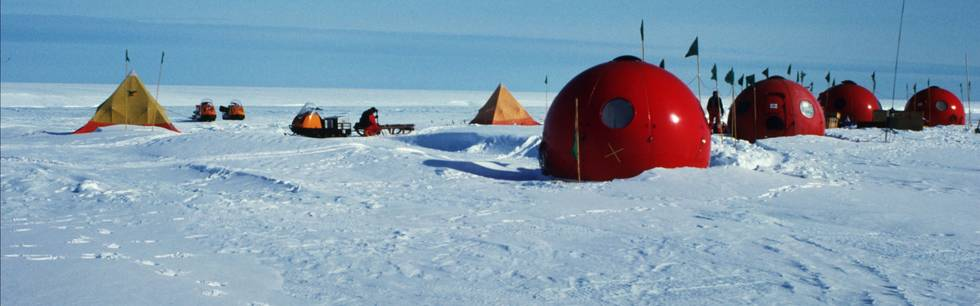
- The camp with the so-called "apples"

- Location in Antarctica
- Coordinates: 72°50′00″S 19°02′00″W
- Region: Riiser-Larsen Ice Shelf
- Location: Near Drescher Inlet
- Established: 1986
- Closed: 2016

Government
  - Type: Administration
  - Body: AWI, West Germany / Germany
- Active times: Some summers

Drescher Ice Camp can refer to a decommissioned permanent research station in the Drescher Inlet on the Riiser-Larsen Ice Shelf as well as any subsequent mobile research stations located at the same site. The ice camp, and the inlet where it is located, are named after Alfred Wegener Institute biologist Eberhard Drescher.

Drescher Ice Camp has been the location of six research campaigns, the most recent of which was in the austral summer of 2015-2016. Each campaign consists of at minimum four people and only occurs during the summer.

== History ==
=== Semipermanent base ===
The semipermanent was built in 1986 and dismantled in 1990. It consisted of three containers which were used primarily as living quarters.

=== Mobile research camp ===
Recent research campaigns have used mobile facilities consisting primarily of pre-fabricated round structures often referred to as "apples". Three of these structures are used for living quarters, while one each is used for the kitchen and communication equipment. The station also makes use of snowmobiles, sledges, and helicopters.

== Research ==
The main research activities at Drescher Ice Camp are concerned with the eating habits and diving behaviors of Weddell seals and emperor penguins. Because of its proximity to open ocean, research at the ice camp is often coordinated with research aboard RV Polarstern.

== See also ==
- List of Antarctic research stations
- List of Antarctic field camps
