= Zavadovskiy Island =

Zavodovskiy Island
- Location within Antarctica

Geography
- Location: Southern Ocean
- Coordinates: 66°43′S 86°24′E
- Area: 100 km^{2} (39 sq mi)
- Highest elevation: 200 m (700 ft)

Demographics
- Population: uninhabited

Druzhba Дружба
- Antarctic research station
- Interactive map of Druzhba
- Coordinates: 66°43′00″S 86°24′00″E
- Established: 20 May 1960
- Closed: 6 August 1960

Government
  - Type: Administration
  - Body: Soviet Antarctic Expedition
- Active times: One winter

Zavadovskiy Island, also known as Penguin Island, is an ice-covered island in the West Ice Shelf near Antarctica located at 66°43′S 86°24′E. It rises to 200 meters (656 feet) and is located 12 miles east of Mikhaylov Island. It was discovered by the Soviet expedition of 1956 which named it for Ivan Zavadovsky, second in command of the Imperial Russian Navy sloop-of-war Vostok in the Bellingshausen expedition in 1819–21.

A temporary field station named Druzhba was opened from May 20 to August 6, 1960, on the island by the Soviet Union to study meteorological conditions.
