= Zapadnoye Lake =

Lake in Antarctica

- Location within Antarctica
- Location: Schirmacher Hills, Queen Maud Land
- Coordinates: 70°44′S 11°28′E
- Basin countries: (Antarctica)

Zapadnoye Lake (70°44′S 11°28′E) is a lake about 0.5 miles (0.8 km) long situated near the western end of the Schirmacher Hills, Queen Maud Land. Mapped by the Soviet Antarctic Expedition in 1961 and named Ozero Zapadnoye (western lake).
