= Petrel Base =

Petrel Station Base Petrel
- Antarctic base
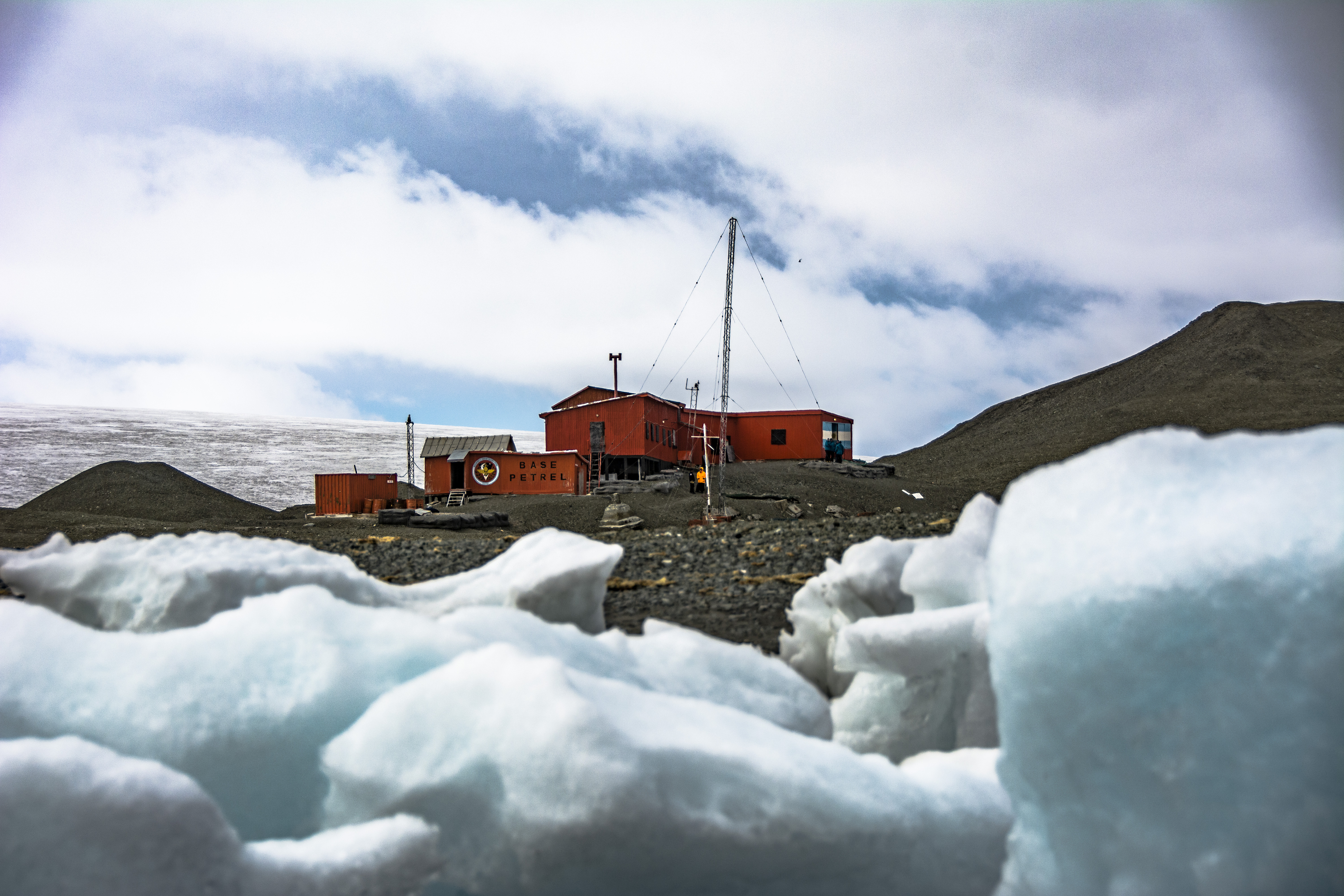

- Location of Petrel Base in Antarctica
- Coordinates: 63°28′41″S 56°13′44″W
- Country: Argentina
- Location in Antarctica: Dundee Island; Joinville Group; Graham Land; Antarctica
- Established: 22 February 1967
- Named after: Petrel / Procellariidae
- Elevation: 18 m (59 ft)

Population (2017)
  - Summer: 25
  - Winter: 0
- Time zone: UTC-3 (ART)
- Type: Seasonal
- Period: Summer
- Status: Operational
- Activities: Geology

Petrel Skiway
- IATA: none; ICAO: SA47

Summary
- Airport type: Private
- Serves: Petrel Base
- Location: Dundee Island
- Time zone: (-4)
- Elevation AMSL: 15 ft (4.6 m)
- Coordinates: 63°28′44″S 56°13′53″W

Map
- Location of airfield in Antarctica

Runways
| Direction | Length | | Surface |
| Direction | ft | m | Surface |
|---|---|---|---|
| 08/26 | 3,485 | 1,062 | Ice |

The Petrel Base (Spanish: Base Petrel) is a permanent Argentine scientific station located on Dundee Island, in the Joinville Group, Graham Land which is a part of the Argentinian claim on Antarctica.

The base, which is 18m above sea level, is 37 km from Esperanza Station and over 1300 km from port Ushuaia.

== History ==
Opened as a permanent base on 22 February 1967, it is being used as a temporary base since 1978.

In 2021, the Argentine government announced plans to construct two runways at the base, with a view to reopening it as a permanent base.

In 2024, a 1600 meter landing strip was built alongside an auxiliary band of 1200 meters.

== See also ==
- Argentine Antarctica
- List of Antarctic research stations
- List of Antarctic field camps
- List of airports in Antarctica
