= Teniente Luis Carvajal Villaroel Antarctic Base =

Carvajal Villaroel Antarctic Base Base Teniente Luis Carvajal Villarroel Station T (until 1984)
- Antarctic research station
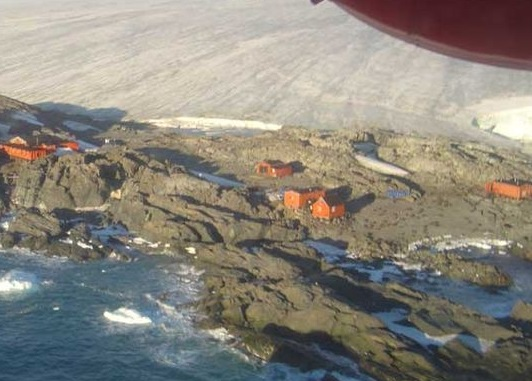
- Carvajal Base taken in March 2004

- Location in Antarctica
- Coordinates: 67°45′40″S 68°54′52″W
- Region: Antarctic Peninsula
- Location: Adelaide Island
- Established: 3 February 1961
- Transferred: 14 August 1984
- Named for: Luis Tomás Carvajal Villarroel

Government
  - Type: Administration
  - Body: INACH, Chile
- Elevation: 4 m (13 ft)

Population (2017)
  - Summer: 46
  - Winter: 0
- Time zone: UTC-3 (CLT)
- Active times: Every summer
- Activities: List: Geology; Geomorphology; Geophysics; Paleoecology; Pollution
- Website: inach.cl

The Teniente Luis Carvajal Villaroel Antarctic Base (Spanish: Teniente Carvajal) is a seasonal Chilean Antarctic base on the south-west tip of Adelaide Island, in Graham Land off the west coast of the Antarctic Peninsula. The nearest land is the Magallanes – the station is in the Antarctic territory claimed by Chile.

== History ==
=== Station T ===
The base was established by The Falkland Islands Dependencies Survey (FIDS) in 1961 and was previously known as Station T.

It was established on the south-west tip of Adelaide Island in preference to Rothera Point as it had a better skiway for aircraft and less sea ice to hinder access by ship. The base was set up to carry out Survey work in the local and extended area, glaciology, geology and meteorology. The base was the main air facility and centre for airborne earth sciences programme. It was occupied continuously by BAS from 3 February 1961 to 1 March 1977. Closed when the skiway deteriorated and operations were transferred to Rothera (Station R).

The original building was known as Stephenson House after A Stephenson, surveyor on the British Graham Land Expedition (BGLE) 1934-37. An additional hut named Rymill House after John Riddoch Rymill, leader of BGLE, was erected in Mar 1962. A separate accommodation hut named Hampton House after W E Hampton, deputy leader and chief pilot of the BGLE, was erected on 1 January 1963. This had been planned originally to be a garage at Fossil Bluff (Station KG). A plastic accommodation building was established on 3 March 1967.

=== Current use ===
The base was transferred to Chile 14 August 1984 and renamed Teniente Luis Carvajal Villaroel Antarctic Base. Chile has used the station as a summer only facility since this time. In the last few years the skiway has deteriorated further, leading to the death of a Chilean air mechanic, when he fell down a crevasse. Since then the Chilean Air Force have ceased operations at Carvajal. The Chilean Navy continues to visit the base during the summer to ensure it is in good order.

During the Winter months, staff at Rothera Station often visit the deserted buildings at Carvajal on BAS "Winter Training Trips".

== See also ==
- List of Antarctic research stations
- List of Antarctic field camps
- Chilean Antarctic Territory
- British Antarctic Territory
- British-Chile relations
- Instituto Antártico Chileno
