= Gondwana Station =

German Antarctic base

- Antarctic base
- Location of Gondwana Laboratory in Antarctica
- Coordinates: 74.635399°S 164.222014°E
- Country: Germany
- Administered by: Federal Institute for Geosciences and Natural Resources
- Established: 1983
- Named after: Gondwana
- Type: Summer

Gondwana Station is a German Antarctic research station on Gerlache Inlet. It is operated by the Federal Institute for Geosciences and Natural Resources.

== History ==
The base was established as a bivouac hut in 1983, and during 1988 and 1989, the station was extended.
