= Italia Valley =

- Location within South Shetland Islands

Geography
- Location: King George Island
- Coordinates: 62°10′32″S 58°30′49″W
- Interactive map of Italia Valley

Italia Valley is a small valley lying east-northeast of Hervé Cove in Ezcurra Inlet, on King George Island in the South Shetland Islands. The feature was named "Conca Italia" (Italian hollow).

== Giacomo Bove Station ==
The valley contains the ruins of the first Italian building in Antarctica built by a private expedition led by Renato Cepparo in 1975–76. The building was destroyed by the Argentine Navy in September 1976. A proposal to add the station ruins to the list of Historic Sites and Monuments (HSM) in Antarctica was submitted to the Antarctic Treaty Consultative Meeting (ATCM).

Giacomo Bove Station Campo Giacomo Bove
- Antarctic research station
- Interactive map of Giacomo Bove Station
- Coordinates: 62°10′20″S 58°31′03″W
- Established: 20 January 1976
- Sabotaged: September 1976
- Named after: Giacomo Bove

Government
  - Type: Administration
  - Body: Renato Cepparo Expedition
- Active times: One summer
