= Soviet Antarctic Expedition =

Antarctica research agency of the Soviet Union

The Soviet Antarctic Expedition (SAE or SovAE) (Russian: Советская антарктическая экспедиция, САЭ, Sovetskaya antarkticheskaya ekspeditsiya) was a Soviet research institute. It was succeeded by the Russian Antarctic Expedition.

== Governance and history ==
The first Soviet contact with Antarctica was in January 1947, when the Slava whaling flotilla began whaling in Antarctic waters.

The Soviet Union's Ministry of the Maritime Fleet was responsible for the administration, logistics and supply of the expeditions. The Soviet Antarctic Expedition was part of the Arctic and Antarctic Research Institute of the Soviet Committee on Antarctic Research of the Academy of Sciences of the USSR.

SAE was succeeded by the Russian Antarctic Expedition.

== Expeditions ==
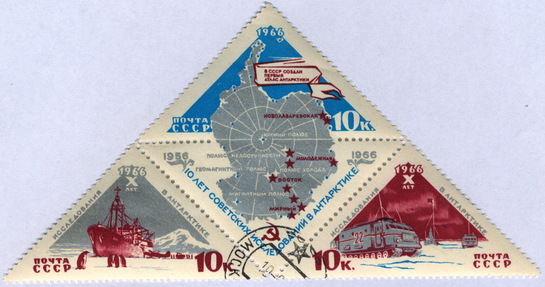
10 Years of Soviet Research in Antarctica, 1966 USSR stamp block

The Soviet Union engaged in expeditions to Antarctica from 1955 to its dissolution. After this, the Soviet Antarctic stations were taken over by Russia.

== Stations ==
The first Soviet Antarctic station, Mirny, was established near the coast on February 13, 1956. In December 1957 another station, Vostok, was built inland near the South geomagnetic pole.

=== Year-round stations ===
- Mirny (established February 13, 1956)
- Vostok (established December 16, 1957)
- Novolazarevskaya (established January 18, 1961)
- Molodyozhnaya (established January 14, 1963)
- Bellingshausen (established February 22, 1968)
- Leningradskaya (established February 25, 1971)
- Russkaya (established March 9, 1980)
- Progress (established April 1, 1988)

=== Summer stations ===
- Komsomolskaya (established November 6, 1957)
- Pionerskaya (established May 27, 1956)
- Druzhnaya I (on the Filchner Ice Shelf in the Weddell Sea)
- Druzhnaya II (on the Weddell Sea)

=== IGY stations ===
List of stations in use during the International Geophysical Year.

- Sovetskaya
- Pole of inaccessibility station

== See also ==
- Arctic and Antarctic Research Institute
- List of Antarctic expeditions
- Soviet and Russian manned drifting ice stations
- List of Russian explorers
- Zapadnoye Lake
