= Little Rockford =

- Antarctic research station
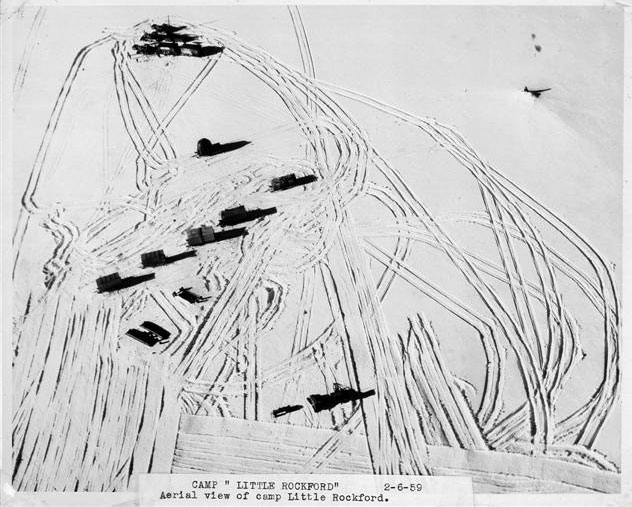
- The base in 1959

- Location in Antarctica
- Coordinates: 79°30′00″S 147°19′00″W
- Region: Ross Ice Shelf
- Location: Near Bay of Whales
- Established: January 1958
- Closed: January 1965
- Named after: Rockford, Illinois

Government
  - Type: Administration
  - Body: USAP, United States
- Active times: Every summer

Little Rockford was an Antarctic exploration base from December 1958 to January 1965, located on the Ross Ice Shelf, south of the Bay of Whales. Little Rockford was a field camp and weather station along the Little America tractor trail and was located between McMurdo Sound and Byrd Station, 160 miles from Little America. It was named after Rockford, Illinois, the hometown of Admiral George Dufek. Admiral Dufek was in charge of the United States military mission, through the United States Navy, to support research in Antarctica named Operation Deep Freeze, and the first man to land at the South Pole by airplane.

Originally, Little Rockford was established near the western edge of the Ross Ice Shelf close to the King Edward VII Peninsula in December 1958. The following year it was relocated to the east edge of Marie Byrd Land. Little Rockford's use was discontinued in January 1965.

== See also ==
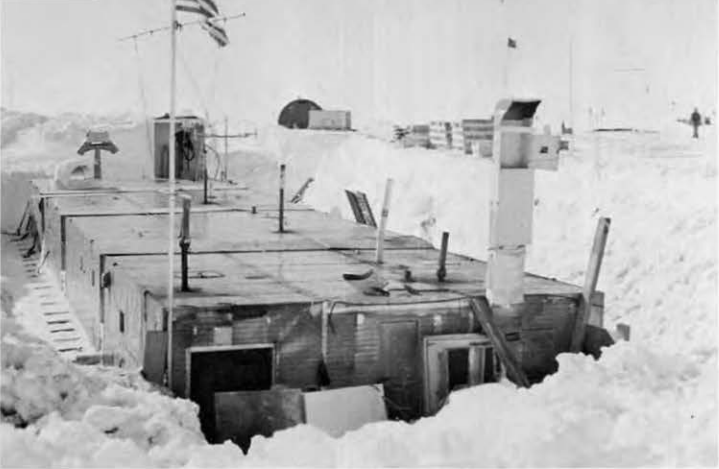
Little Rockford Weather Station

- List of Antarctic research stations
- Little America
