= Council of Managers of National Antarctic Programs =

International association of the National Antarctic Programs

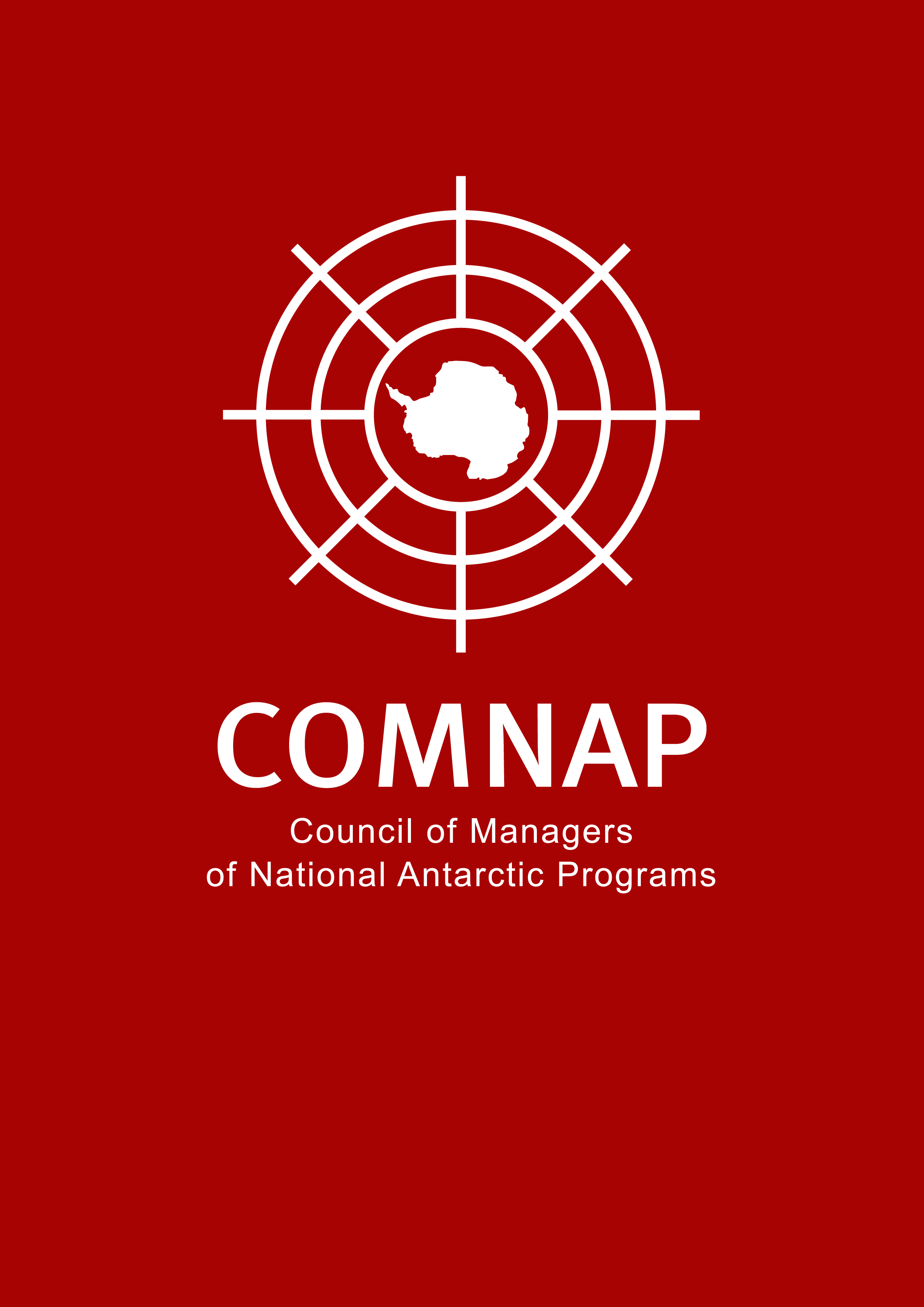
- Logo
- Headquarters: Christchurch, New Zealand
- Membership: 33 members: Argentina; Australia; Belarus; Belgium; Brazil; Bulgaria; Canada; Chile; China; Czech Republic; Ecuador; Finland; France; Germany; India; Italy; Japan; Netherlands; New Zealand; Norway; Peru; Poland; Portugal; Russia; South Africa; South Korea; Spain; Sweden; Turkey; Ukraine; United Kingdom; United States; Uruguay; 4 observers: Colombia; Malaysia; Switzerland; Venezuela
- Establishment: 1988
- Website www.comnap.aq

Council of Managers of National Antarctic Programs (COMNAP) is an international association that develops and promotes best practice in managing the support of scientific research in Antarctica. Members are composed of national research programs who respective governments are signatories to the Antarctic Treaty committing the continent as a natural reserve.

COMNAP members are responsible for the operation of around 80 research stations and the other infrastructure that supports science across Antarctica. Its secretariat is in Christchurch, New Zealand. COMNAP has an observer status and reports its activities at the yearly Antarctic Treaty Consultative Meetings.

== Activities ==
Through collaboration, members gather research data from all Antarctic regions from terrestrial, marine and atmospheric environments. COMNAP convenes geographic regional break-out groups covering the Peninsula, Ross Sea, East Antarctica, Larsemann Hills, Dronning Maud Land, and High Plateau. Antarctic research is enabled by a multitude of key scientific infrastructure, facilities and support platforms operated by countries across these regions and disciplines.

COMNAP has developed comprehensive guidelines on a range of topics in support of science in Antarctica. These include air safety, managing waste, preventing oil spills, contingency planning and reducing impact on the Antarctic environment. It has established working groups and networks addressing such issues as shipping and air operations, energy management, training and environmental issues.

== Membership ==
Countries engaging in Antarctic research, which are also signatories to the Antarctic Treaty and the Environmental Protocol may participate in COMNAP. Membership is open to those countries’ national agencies responsible for planning and conducting Antarctic operations in support of science.

Country	National Antarctic Program	Status	Year-round facilities	Seasonal facilities
Argentina	Dirección Nacional del Antártico	Founding Member	6	7
Australia	Australian Antarctic Division	Founding Member	3	0
Belarus	National Academy of Sciences of Belarus	Member since 2015	0	1
Belgium	Belgian Federal Science Policy and Polar Secretariat	Member	0	1
Brazil	Programa Antártico Brasileiro	Founding Member	1	0
Bulgaria	Bulgarian Antarctic Institute	Member since 1994	0	1
Canada	Polar Knowledge Canada	Member since 2022	0	0
Chile	Instituto Antártico Chileno	Founding Member	3	6
China	Chinese Arctic and Antarctic Administration and Polar Research Institute of China	Founding Member	2	2
Colombia	Colombian Antarctic Program	Member	0	0
Czech Republic	Masaryk University	Member	0	1
Ecuador	Instituto Oceanográfico y Antartico de la Armada	Member	0	1
Finland	Finnish Antarctic Research Program at the Finnish Meteorological Institute	Member	0	1
France	Institut Polaire Français Paul-Émile Victor	Founding Member	2	0
Germany	Alfred Wegener Institute for Polar and Marine Research	Founding Member	1	2
India	National Centre for Polar & Ocean Research	Founding Member	2	0
Italy	Programma Nazionale Di Ricerche in Antartide	Founding Member	1	1
Japan	National Institute of Polar Research (Japan)	Founding Member	1	0
Malaysia	Sultan Mizan Antarctic Research Foundation	Observer	0	0
Netherlands	Dutch Research Council	Member	1	0
New Zealand	Antarctica New Zealand	Founding Member	1	0
Norway	Norwegian Polar Institute	Founding Member	1	0
Peru	Division of Antarctic Affairs	Member	0	1
Poland	Poland Institute of Biochemistry and Biophysics, Polish Academy of Sciences	Founding Member	1	0
Portugal	Fundação para a Ciência e a Tecnologia	Member since 2023 (Observer since 2015)	0	0
Russia	Arctic and Antarctic Research Institute and Russian Antarctic Expedition	Founding Member	5	5
South Africa	South African National Antarctic Programme	Founding Member	1	0
South Korea	Korea Polar Research Institute	Founding Member	2	0
Spain	Comité Polar Español	Founding Member	0	3
Sweden	Swedish Polar Research Secretariat	Founding Member	0	1
Switzerland	Swiss Committee on Polar and High Altitude Research	Observer	0	0
Turkey	TÜBITAK Marmara Research Center, Polar Research Institute	Member	0	0
Ukraine	National Antarctic Scientific Center of Ukraine	Member	1	0
United Kingdom	British Antarctic Survey	Founding Member	2	1
United States	National Science Foundation Office of Polar Programs	Founding Member	3	0
Uruguay	Uruguayan Antarctic Institute	Member	1	1
Venezuela	Venezuelan Institute for Scientific Research	Observer	0	0

== See also ==
- Research stations in Antarctica
- Scientific Committee on Antarctic Research
- Michelle Rogan-Finnemore, Executive Secretary
