= Drescher Inlet =

Inlet of Antarctica

Coordinates: 72°49′57″S 19°13′07″W

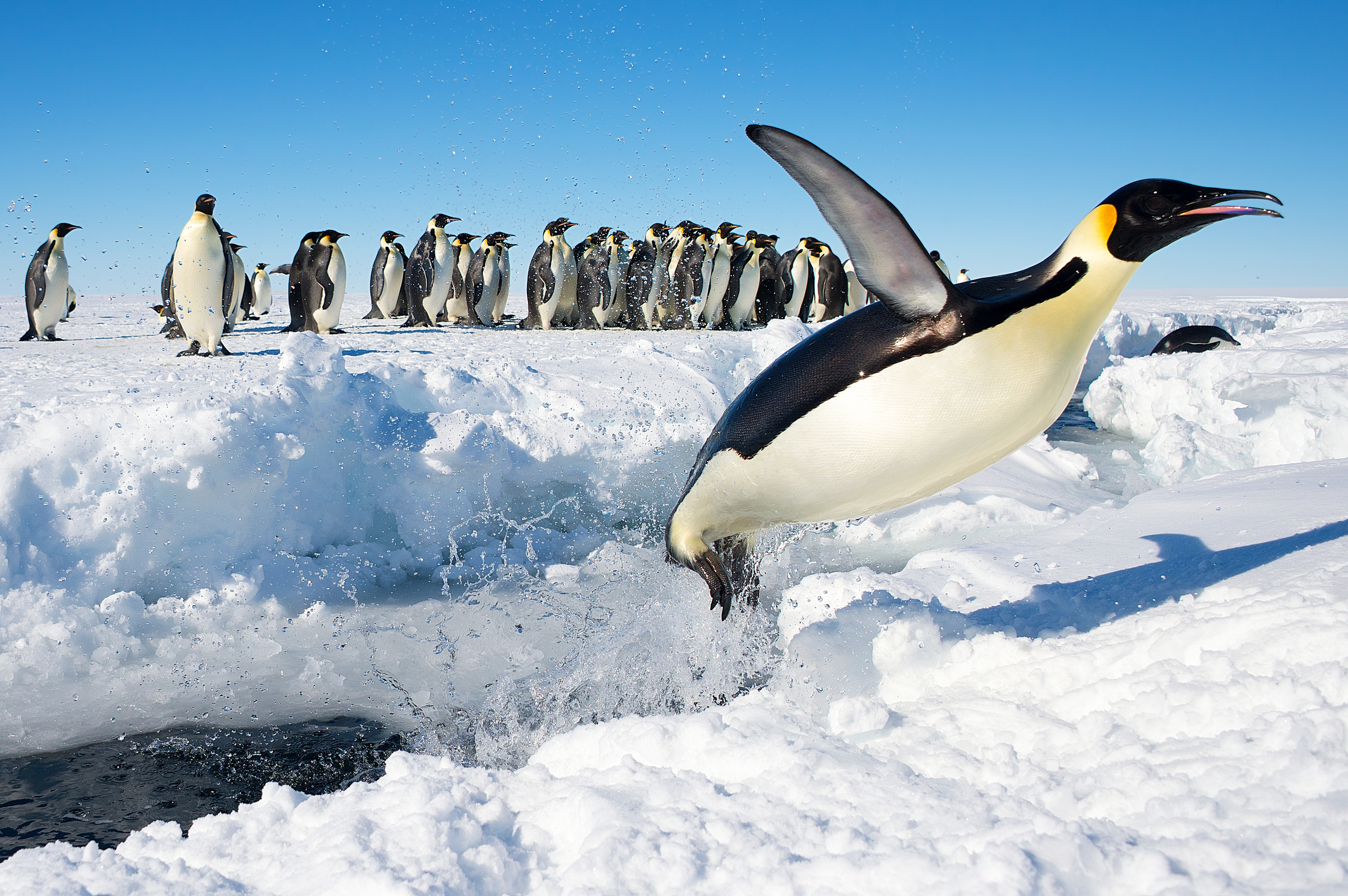
Emperor penguins breed in the IBA

Drescher Inlet, also known as Dreschereisfrontkerbe, is an inlet or iceport in the front Riiser-Larsen Ice Shelf on the coast of Queen Maud Land, Antarctica. Some 25 km long and 3 km wide, it was named after Eberhard Drescher (1944–1983), a marine biologist at Germany's Alfred Wegener Institute for Polar and Marine Research.

== Important Bird Area ==
A 368 ha site on fast ice near the inlet has been designated an Important Bird Area (IBA) by BirdLife International because it supports a colony of about 6,600 emperor penguins, the number estimated from 2009 satellite imagery. Weddell seals are also known to breed in the vicinity.
