= ECARE =

Ruperto Elichiribehety Station Estación científica antártica Ruperto Elichiribehety Station D (until 1997)
- Antarctic research station
- Nickname: ECARE
- Location in Antarctica
- Coordinates: 63°24′09″S 56°59′27″W
- Region: Antarctic Peninsula
- Location: Near Hut Cove
- Established: 13 February 1945
- Transferred: 22 December 1997
- Named for: Ruperto Elichiribehety

Government
  - Type: Administration
  - Body: Uruguayan Antarctic Institute
- Elevation: 2.8 m (9.2 ft)

Population (2017)
  - Summer: 7
  - Winter: 0
- Active times: Every summer
- Activities: List: Geodesy; Microbiology; Oceanography

The Estación Científica Antártica Ruperto Elichiribehety (English: Ruperto Elichiribehety Antarctic Scientific Station; better known in English by its Spanish acronym ECARE) is an Uruguay summer research station in Antarctica, established by the Uruguayan Antarctic Institute on December 22, 1997 on the Antarctic Peninsula.

ECARE is located in Hut Cove, southeast of Hope Bay in the northeastern part of the Antarctic Peninsula, next to the Argentinian Esperanza Base. The Station can accommodate eight people, and it is dedicated to support scientific projects in the surrounding area. It was formerly the British Station D, known as Trinity House.

The station is named in honour of Ruperto Elichiribehety, a Uruguayan Navy Lieutenant who, in 1916, led the Uruguayan Expedition attempting to rescue the Shackleton–Rowett Expedition that was lost on Elephant Island.

== See also ==
- List of Antarctic research stations
- List of Antarctic field camps
