= Russian Antarctic Expedition =

Russian Antarctic Expedition (Russian: Российская Антарктическая экспедиция; RAE) is a continuously operating expedition of the Arctic and Antarctic Research Institute of the Federal Service for Hydrometeorology and Environmental Monitoring of Russia. The RAE involves winterers, who spend about a year in the Antarctic, and seasonal teams, working in the Antarctic summer.

== History ==
It is the successor of the Soviet Antarctic Expedition, which had been working since 1955. The RAE is a member of the subprogram "Study and exploration of the Antarctic" of the Russian federal target program "World ocean".

In the autumn of 2011, the 57th seasonal expedition began. Over 200 permanent and seasonal personnel work at five permanent and several seasonal polar stations. Work is underway to transfer the expedition's main base from Mirny Station to Progress Station.
