= Mirny Station =

Mirny Station Мирный
- Antarctic station
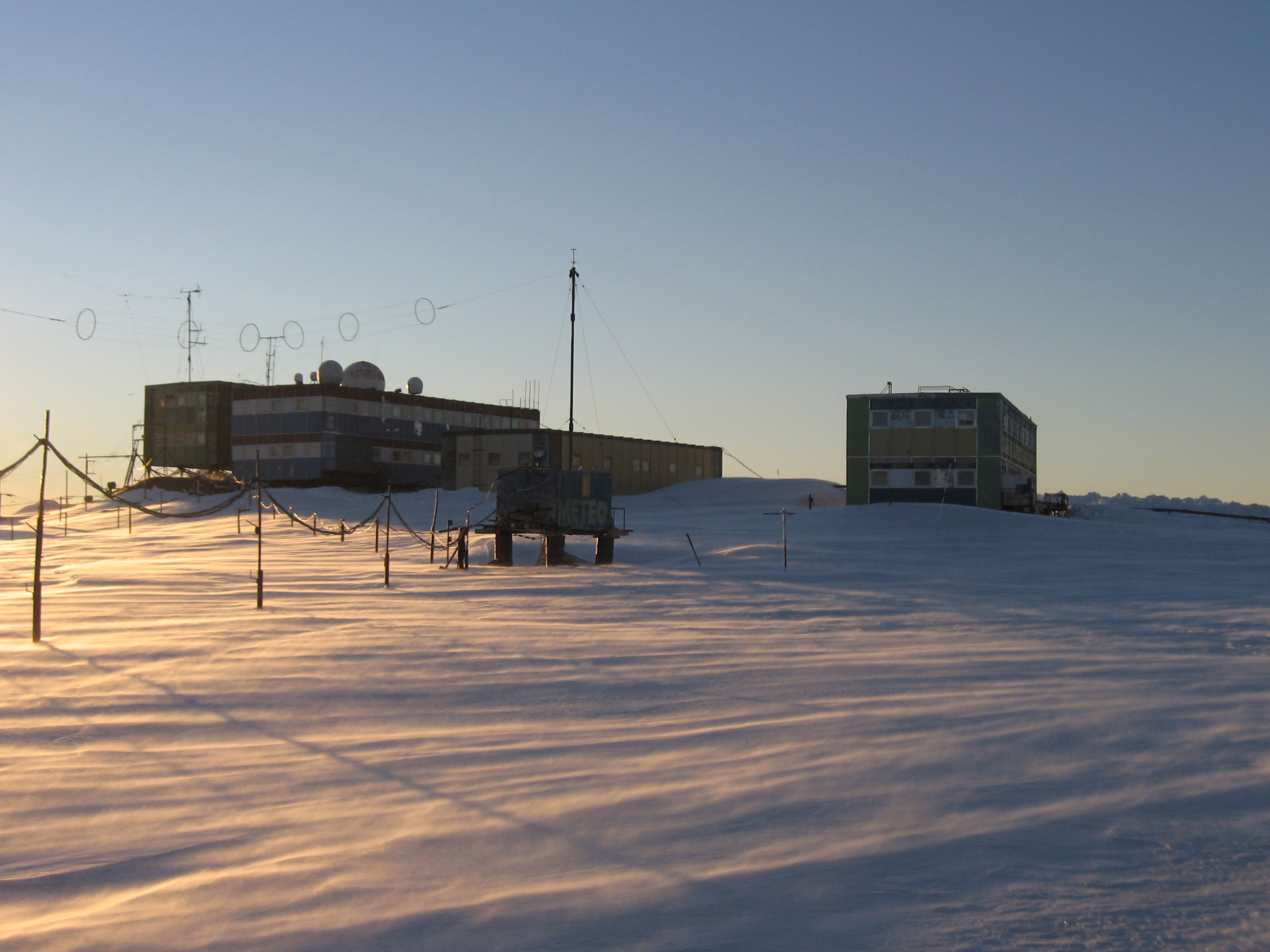
- Mirny Station in 2007

- Location of Mirny Station in Antarctica
- Coordinates: 66°33′11″S 93°00′35″E
- Country: Russia
- Location in Antarctica: Australian Antarctic Territory
- Administered by: Arctic and Antarctic Research Institute
- Operational: 13 February 1956
- Named for: Mirny
- Elevation: 35 m (115 ft)

Population (2017)
  - Summer: 50
  - Winter: 25
- UN/LOCODE: AQ MIR
- Type: All-year round
- Period: Annual
- Status: Operational
- Activities: List: Glaciology; Seismology; Meteorology; Observation of polar lights; Cosmic radiation; Marine biology
- Website: www.aari.nw.ru

The Mirny Station (Russian: Мирный, lit. 'peaceful') is a Russian Antarctic science station. It is located in Queen Mary Land, Antarctica, on the Antarctic coast of the Davis Sea.

The station is managed by the Arctic and Antarctic Research Institute and was named after the support vessel Mirny captained by Mikhail Lazarev during the First Russian Antarctic Expedition, led by Fabian Gottlieb von Bellingshausen on Vostok.

Mirny Station was damaged by a fire on Sunday 21 June 2020.

== Purpose and facilities ==
The station was opened on February 13, 1956, by the 1st Soviet Antarctic Expedition. It was originally used as main base for the Vostok Station located 1,400 kilometres (870 mi) from the coast, this function is now served by Progress Station. In summer, it hosts up to 50 people in 30 buildings, in winter about 40–50 scientists and technicians. The average temperature at the location is −11 °C (12 °F), and on more than 200 days per year the wind is stronger than 15 metres per second (49 ft/s), with occasional cyclones.

Main areas of research are glaciology, seismology, meteorology, observation of polar lights, cosmic radiation, and marine biology.

== Historic monuments ==
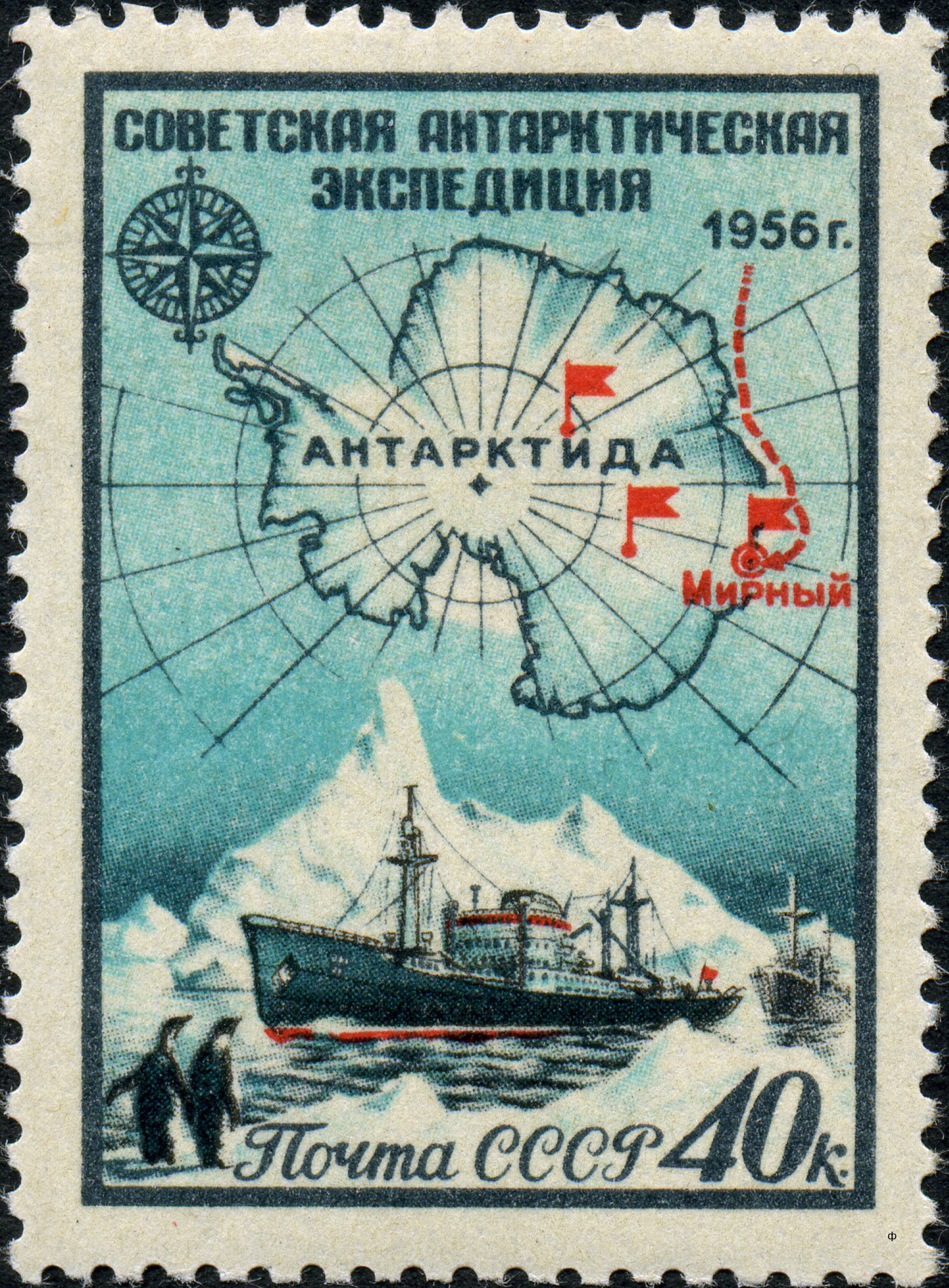
Mirny base on a 1956 stamp

Some 2 kilometres (1.2 mi) south of the station stands a metal stele with an inscribed plaque. It was erected on a sledge on the land transport route between coastal Mirny and inland Vostok Station. It commemorates Anatoly Shcheglov, a driver-mechanic who died while performing his duties. It has been designated a Historic Site or Monument (HSM 8) following a proposal by Russia to the Antarctic Treaty Consultative Meeting. Other similarly designated historic sites in the vicinity of Mirny are Ivan Khmara's Stone (HSM 7) and the Buromskiy Island Cemetery (HSM 9), both on Buromskiy Island 2.7 kilometres (1.7 mi) north of the station.

== Climate ==
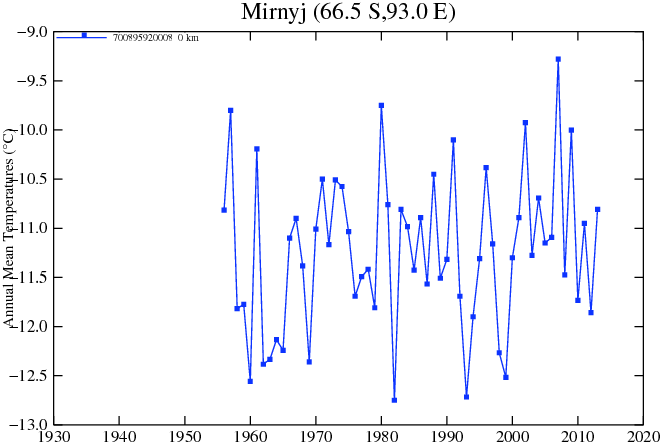
Climate graph of 1956-2012 air average temperatures at Mirny Sta.

Mirny Station has an ice cap climate, since all months are below 0 °C (32 °F). Although, it is heavily influenced by the glacial nature of Antarctica's interior, it retains a strong maritime influence, resulting in high annual snowfall. Summers however, are sunny and dry, reflecting a mediterranean precipitation pattern, in spite of its poleward latitude and cold temperatures. Summer sees highs approaching 2 °C (36 °F) on average, whereas winters are stable just below −15 °C (5 °F) means for several months. Due to its coastal location and the fact that summer temperatures sometimes rise above freezing, limited plant and animal life flourishes during summer (December, January, February).

Climate data for Mirny Station
Month	Jan	Feb	Mar	Apr	May	Jun	Jul	Aug	Sep	Oct	Nov	Dec	Year
Mean daily maximum °C (°F)	1.1 (34.0)	−1.8 (28.8)	−6.9 (19.6)	−10.8 (12.6)	−12.3 (9.9)	−12.2 (10.0)	−13.3 (8.1)	−13.8 (7.2)	−13.2 (8.2)	−9.8 (14.4)	−3.7 (25.3)	0.4 (32.7)	−8.0 (17.6)
Daily mean °C (°F)	−1.8 (28.8)	−5.3 (22.5)	−10.2 (13.6)	−13.9 (7.0)	−15.5 (4.1)	−15.4 (4.3)	−16.6 (2.1)	−17.0 (1.4)	−16.4 (2.5)	−13.4 (7.9)	−7.2 (19.0)	−2.6 (27.3)	−11.3 (11.7)
Mean daily minimum °C (°F)	−4.6 (23.7)	−8.4 (16.9)	−13.0 (8.6)	−16.7 (1.9)	−18.5 (−1.3)	−18.3 (−0.9)	−19.6 (−3.3)	−20.2 (−4.4)	−19.3 (−2.7)	−16.6 (2.1)	−10.3 (13.5)	−5.5 (22.1)	−14.2 (6.4)
Average precipitation mm (inches)	14.8 (0.58)	17.1 (0.67)	31.2 (1.23)	43.5 (1.71)	57.3 (2.26)	70.3 (2.77)	71.7 (2.82)	62.1 (2.44)	57.9 (2.28)	43.5 (1.71)	34.0 (1.34)	23.7 (0.93)	527.1 (20.74)
Average relative humidity (%)	72.5	70.5	71.6	73.9	74.7	76.0	75.1	74.2	72.8	70.1	70.4	72.4	72.9
Mean monthly sunshine hours	278.7	214.4	153.2	95.4	32.3	1.7	11.1	66.9	125.8	234.6	290.7	354.2	1,859
Source: Arctic and Antarctic Research Institute

== See also ==
- List of Antarctic research stations
- List of Antarctic field camps
