= Cape Filchner =

Cape Filchner is an ice-covered cape fronting on Davis Sea, 17 miles west-northwest (WNW) of Adams Island. Cape Filchner is located at 66°27′S 91°54′E. Cape Filchner is the division between Wilhelm II Coast and Queen Mary Coast. Cape Filchner was discovered by the Australian Antarctic Expedition (1911–1914) under Sir Douglas Mawson, who named it for Wilhelm Filchner, leader of the German Antarctic Expedition of 1911–1912.
