= Progress Station =

Progress Station Прогресс
- Antarctic station
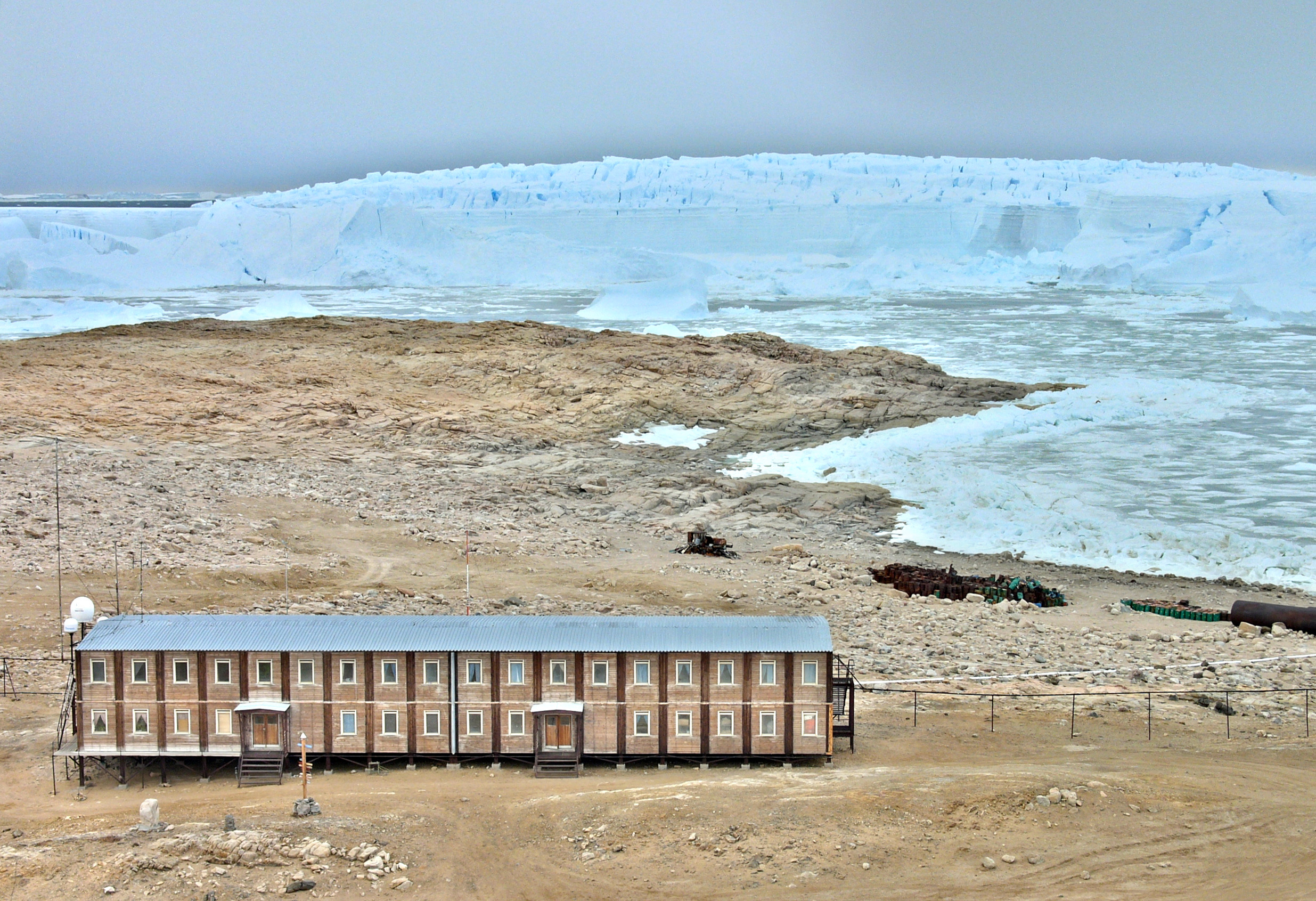
- Central building of Progress Station in summer 2007

- Location of Progress Station in Antarctica
- Coordinates: 69°22′51″S 76°23′25″E
- Country: Soviet Union; Russia
- Location in Antarctica: Larsemann Hills; Antarctica
- Administered by: Arctic and Antarctic Research Institute
- Established: 1 April 1988
- Elevation: 15 m (49 ft)

Population (2017)
  - Summer: 50
  - Winter: 25
- Time zone: UTC+5
- UN/LOCODE: AQ PRO
- Type: All-year round
- Period: Annual
- Status: Operational
- Activities: List: Geology; Geodosy; Geophysics; Glaciology; Marine biology
- Website: www.aari.nw.ru

Progress (Russian: Прогресс) is a Russian (formerly Soviet) research station in Antarctica. It is located at the Larsemann Hills antarctic oasis on the shore of Prydz Bay.

The station was established by the 33rd Soviet Antarctic Expedition on April 1, 1988, and was moved to another place on February 26, 1989 In 2000, work was temporarily halted but it reopened in 2003.

A landing field is located close to the station for air connection with other stations. From 1998 to 2001 works were performed to transfer transportation operations to Progress from the Mirny Station and make it the main support base for Vostok station.

In 2004, work began on a year-round facility at the station. On October 4, 2008, a fire broke out at the construction site resulting in the death of a construction worker and two serious injuries. The fire resulted in the complete loss of the new structure, as well as damage to the station's communications and scientific equipment.

In 2013, the construction of a new wintering complex was completed. It is a residential unit with a sauna and gym, rooms for meteorologists and radio operators, a medical care unit which doubles as a regional hospital, and its own galley.

In 2022, the wintering complex was modernized and enlarged. An additional adjacent airfield, complementing the pre-existing Progress Skiway and called Zenit after the St. Petersburg football club, was built from scratch and features a runway of 3,000 meters length and 100 meters width, which is also able to accommodate larger planes such as the Ilyushin IL-76.

== Climate ==
Climate data for Progress Station
Month	Jan	Feb	Mar	Apr	May	Jun	Jul	Aug	Sep	Oct	Nov	Dec	Year
Mean daily maximum °C (°F)	3.3 (37.9)	0.0 (32.0)	−6.1 (21.0)	−9.5 (14.9)	−11.9 (10.6)	−10.6 (12.9)	−12.9 (8.8)	−12.5 (9.5)	−10.6 (12.9)	−7.9 (17.8)	−1.9 (28.6)	2.8 (37.0)	−6.5 (20.3)
Daily mean °C (°F)	0.6 (33.1)	−2.6 (27.3)	−8.2 (17.2)	−12.0 (10.4)	−14.7 (5.5)	−13.8 (7.2)	−16.0 (3.2)	−15.9 (3.4)	−14.2 (6.4)	−11.5 (11.3)	−5.0 (23.0)	0.3 (32.5)	−9.4 (15.0)
Mean daily minimum °C (°F)	−1.6 (29.1)	−4.6 (23.7)	−10.0 (14.0)	−14.6 (5.7)	−17.5 (0.5)	−16.1 (3.0)	−19.1 (−2.4)	−18.1 (−0.6)	−16.1 (3.0)	−14.1 (6.6)	−7.7 (18.1)	−2.1 (28.2)	−11.8 (10.7)
Average precipitation mm (inches)	5.2 (0.20)	11.2 (0.44)	16.9 (0.67)	9.9 (0.39)	16.8 (0.66)	18.7 (0.74)	11.8 (0.46)	11.5 (0.45)	15.8 (0.62)	14.0 (0.55)	6.8 (0.27)	10.3 (0.41)	148.9 (5.86)
Average relative humidity (%)	60.9	59.5	62.2	59.5	59.0	58.8	58.1	58.1	59.9	58.9	58.9	60.4	59.5
Mean monthly sunshine hours	347.3	180.1	118.4	77.6	14.0	0.0	5.8	66.1	124.0	228.5	332.7	365.8	1,860.3
Source: Arctic and Antarctic Research Institute

== See also ==
Progress Skiway
- IATA: none; ICAO: none

Summary
- Airport type: Private
- Location: Larsemann Hills
- Elevation AMSL: 289 ft (88 m)
- Coordinates: 69°25′51″S 76°19′55″E

Map
- Location of airfield in Antarctica

Runways
Direction	Length		Surface
Direction	ft	m	Surface
	3,280	1,000	Ice

- List of Antarctic research stations
- List of Antarctic field camps
- Airports in Antarctica
