= Queen Mary Land =

Australian Antarctic claim

Location of Queen Mary Land (red), Australian Antarctic Territory in Antarctica

Queen Mary Land or the Queen Mary Coast (66°45′S 96°0′E) is the portion of the coast of Antarctica lying between Cape Filchner, in 91° 54' E, and Cape Hordern, at 100° 30' E. It is claimed by Australia as part of the Australian Antarctic Territory.

It was discovered in February 1912 by the Australasian Antarctic Expedition (1911–14) under the leadership of Douglas Mawson, who named it for Mary of Teck, queen consort of George V.
