= Arctic and Antarctic Research Institute =

Russian research institute

Coordinates: 59°56′47.5″N 30°14′0″E

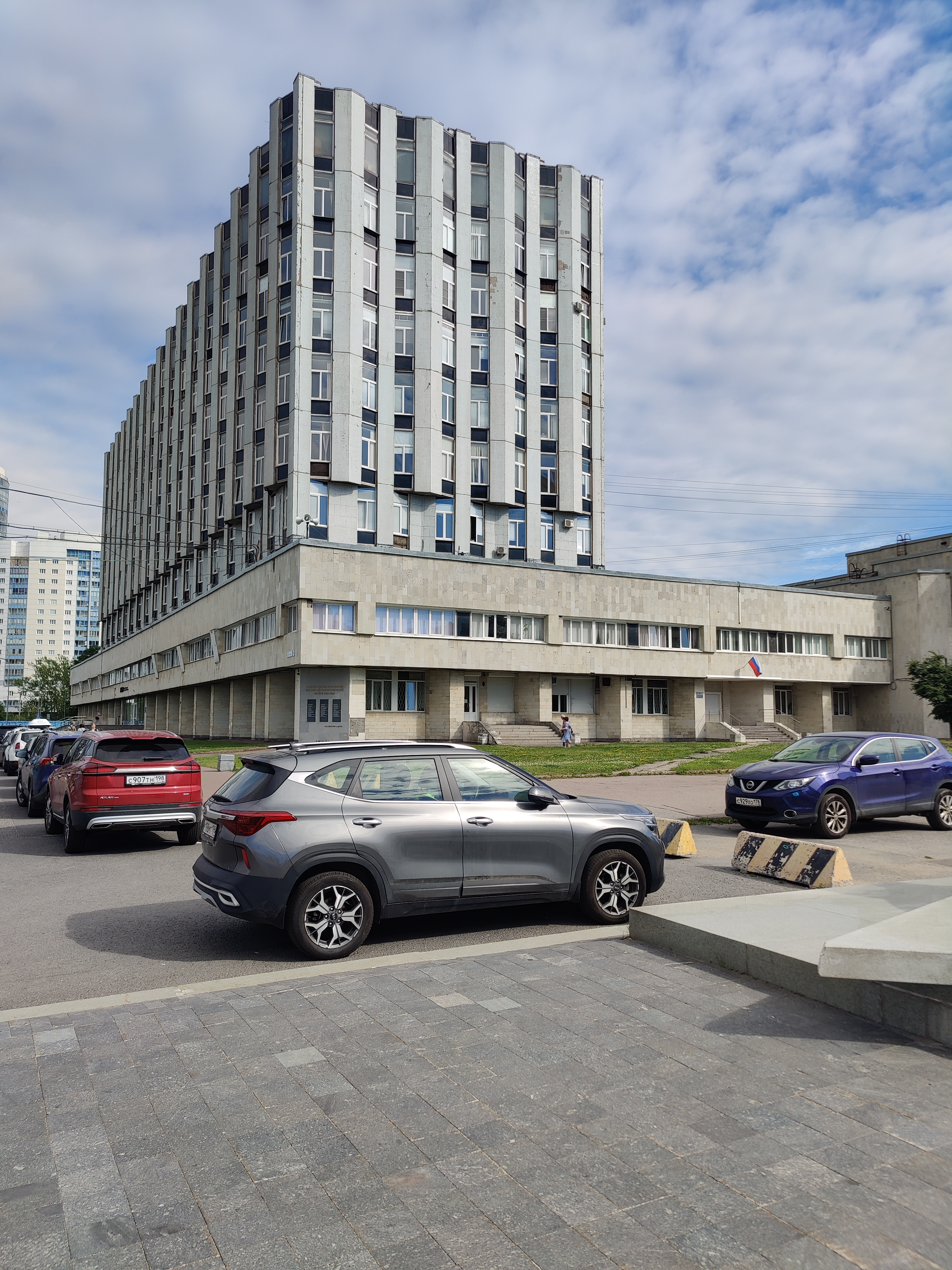
- English-language Logo Headquarters in Saint Petersburg
- Other name: Russian: Арктический и антарктический научно-исследовательский институт
- Established: 3 March 1920
- Focus: Research into the Arctic and Antarctica
- Owner: Federal Service for Hydrometeorology and Environmental Monitoring
- Formerly called: Northern Research and Trade Expedition; Institute of Northern Studies; All-Union Arctic Institute
- Location: Saint Petersburg, Russia
- Interactive map of Arctic and Antarctic Research Institute
- Website: www.aari.ru/ and www.aari.ru/main.php

The Arctic and Antarctic Research Institute, or AARI (Russian: Арктический и антарктический научно-исследовательский институт, romanized: Arkticheskiy i antarkticheskiy nauchno-issledovatelskiy institut, abbreviated as ААНИИ) is the oldest and largest Russian research institute in the field of comprehensive studies of Arctic and Antarctica. It is located in Saint Petersburg and is subordinated to the Federal Service for Hydrometeorology and Environmental Monitoring.

The AARI has numerous departments, such as those of oceanography, glaciology, meteorology, hydrology or Arctic river mouths and water resources, geophysics, polar geography, and others. It also has a computer center, ice research laboratory, experimental workshops, and a museum (the Arctic and Antarctic Museum).

Scientists, such as Alexander Karpinsky, Alexander Fersman, Yuly Shokalsky, Nikolai Knipovich, Lev Berg, Otto Schmidt, Rudolf Samoylovich, Vladimir Vize, Nikolai Zubov, Pyotr Shirshov, Nikolai Urvantsev, and Yakov Gakkel have all made contributions to the work of the AARI.

Throughout its history, the AARI has organized more than a thousand Arctic expeditions, including dozens of high-latitude aerial expeditions, which transported 34(?) crewed drifting ice stations Severniy Polyus ("Северный полюс", or North Pole) to Central Arctic. In 2019-2020 Arctic and Antarctic Research Institute joined a biggest in history Arctic expedition MOSAiC, where its scientists were primarily involved in measurements of sea ice mechanics and seismics.

== History ==
The AARI was founded on 3 March 1920 as the Northern Research and Trade Expedition (Северная научно-промысловая экспедиция) under the Scientific and Technical Department of the All-Union Council of State Economy. In 1925, the expedition was reorganized into the Institute of Northern Studies (Институт по изучению Севера) and five years later - into the All-Union Arctic Institute (Всесоюзный арктический институт). In 1932, the institute was integrated into the Chief Directorate of the Northern Sea Route (Главное управление Северного морского пути). In 1948 the Arctic Geology Research Institute (Научно-исследовательский институт геологии Арктики, or НИИГА) was established on the basis of the geology department of the All-Union Arctic Institute, which would subordinate to the Ministry of Geology of the USSR.

In 1955, the AARI participated in the organization of Antarctic research. In 1958, it began to organize and lead all of the Soviet Antarctic expeditions, which would later make geographic discoveries, and in the same year the All-Union Arctic Institute was renamed Arctic and Antarctic Research Institute. In 1963, the AARI was incorporated into the Chief Administration of the Hydrometeorological Service (Главное управление Гидрометеослужбы) under the Council of Ministers of the USSR (now Federal Service for Hydrometeorology and Environmental Monitoring of Russia). In 1967, AARI was awarded the Order of Lenin.

== See also ==
- Arctic and Antarctic Museum
- Arkticheskiy Institut Islands
- Chief Directorate of the Northern Sea Route
- International Ice Charting Working Group
- Russian Hydrographic Service
