= Arctic exploration =

Physical exploration of the Arctic region

The 10 °C (50 °F) mean isotherm in July line (in red) commonly defines the border of the Arctic region.

Arctic exploration is the physical exploration of the Arctic region of the Earth. It refers to the historical period during which mankind has explored the region north of the Arctic Circle. Historical records suggest that humankind have explored the northern extremes since 325 BC, when the ancient Greek sailor Pytheas reached a frozen sea while attempting to find a source of the metal tin. Dangerous oceans and poor weather conditions often fetter explorers attempting to reach polar regions, and journeying through these perils by sight, boat, and foot has proven difficult.

== Ancient history ==
=== Indo-European hypothesis ===
A controversial hypothesis, often regarded as pseudohistory, sets the home of the mythical people Hyperboreans in the Arctic. The scientist and author John G. Bennett talked about it in his research paper "The Hyperborean Origin of the Indo-European Culture" (1963). The theory was originally put forth by William F. Warren, the first President of Boston University, in his Paradise Found or the Cradle of the Human Race at the North Pole. Later, Indian independence activist Bal Gangadhar Tilak resurrected Warren's theory in his The Arctic Home in the Vedas (1903), which was dedicated to philologist and indologist Max Müller, with whom Tilak had shared ideas before the book was completed. Austro-Hungarian ethnologist Karl Penka also discussed the same idea in his Origins of the Aryans (1883). Tilak's theory was popularized by Russian nationalists, due to the work of Soviet historian and ethnographer Natalya Romanovna Guseva and Soviet ethnographer S.V Zharnikova, who argued for a northern Urals Arctic homeland of the Indo-Aryan and Slavic people.

Hindu nationalist Madhavrao Sadashivrao Golwalkar also supported and was inspired by Tilak's idea. In his famous 1939 publication We or Our Nationhood Defined, he stated that "Undoubtedly [...] we – Hindus – have been in undisputed and undisturbed possession of this land for over eight or even ten thousand years before the land was invaded by any foreign race."

Ancient Greek historian and geographer Herodotus said that the Hyperboreans lived beyond the Massagetae and Issedones. Since these are both Central Asian peoples, one could speculate that his Hyperboreans lived in Siberia. In his twelve labours, Heracles sought the golden-antlered hind of Artemis in Hyperborea. Since the reindeer is the only deer species of which females bear antlers, this would suggest an arctic or subarctic region. Scholar James D. P. Bolton instead located the Issedones people on the south-western slopes of the Altay mountains, which led his colleague Carl P. Ruck to place Hyperborea beyond the Dzungarian Gate into the northern part of the Xinjiang region, adding that the Hyperboreans were probably Chinese.

=== Ancient Greece ===
Some scholars believe that the first attempts to penetrate the Arctic Circle can be traced to ancient Greece and the sailor Pytheas, a contemporary of Aristotle and Alexander the Great, who, in 325 BC, attempted to find the source of the tin that would sporadically reach the Greek colony of Massilia (now Marseille) on the Mediterranean coast. Sailing past the Pillars of Hercules, he reached Brittany and then Cornwall, eventually circumnavigating the British Isles. From the local population, he heard news of the mysterious land of Thule, even farther to the north. After six days of sailing, he reached land at the edge of a frozen sea (described by him as "curdled"), and described what is believed to be the aurora and the midnight sun. Some historians claim that this new land of Thule was either the Norwegian coast or the Shetland Islands based on his descriptions and the trade routes of early British sailors. While no one knows exactly how far Pytheas sailed, he may have crossed the Arctic Circle. Nevertheless, his tales were regarded as fantasy by later Greek and Roman authorities, such as the geographer Strabo.

== Middle Ages ==
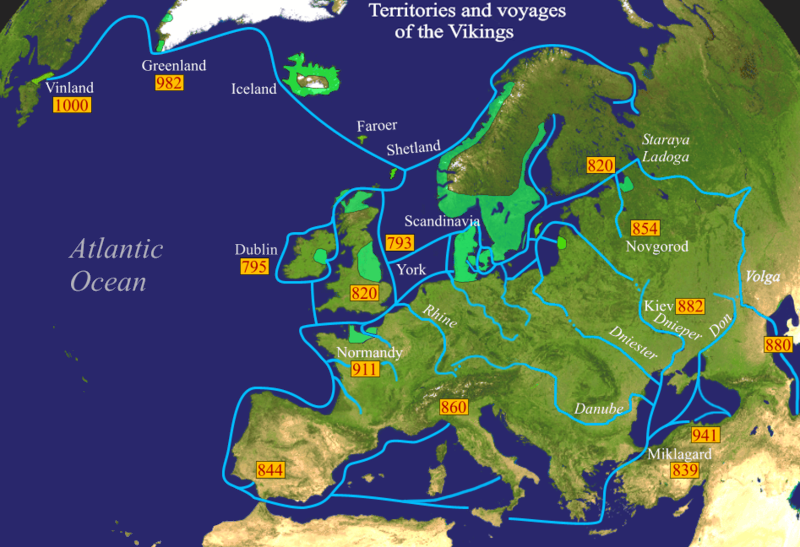
Viking sailors reached the White Sea, Greenland and North America

Naddodd is said to have encountered Iceland when he lost his route due to harsh conditions when sailing from Norway to the Faroe Islands in the 860s. In the 10th century, Gunnbjörn Ulfsson got lost in a storm and ended up within sight of the Greenland coast. His report spurred Erik the Red, an outlawed chieftain, to establish a settlement there in 985. While they flourished initially, these settlements eventually petered out until about 1450. Initially this abandonment of the colony was credited to the Little Ice Age but that has been disputed by recent studies which suggest there were more complex factors at play.

Greenland's early settlers sailed westward, in search of better pasturage and hunting grounds. Modern scholars debate the precise location of the new lands of Vinland, Markland, and Helluland that they discovered.

The Scandinavian peoples also pushed farther north into their own peninsula by land and by sea. As early as 880, the Viking Ohthere of Hålogaland rounded the Scandinavian Peninsula and sailed to the Kola Peninsula and the White Sea. The Pechenga Monastery on the north of Kola Peninsula was founded by Russian monks in 1533; from their base at Kola, the Pomors explored the Barents Region, Spitsbergen, and Novaya Zemlya – all of which are in the Arctic Circle. They also explored north by boat, discovering the Northern Sea Route, as well as penetrating to the trans-Ural areas of northern Siberia. Pomors founded the settlement of Mangazeya east of the Yamal Peninsula in the early 16th century. In 1648 the Cossack Semyon Dezhnyov opened the now famous Bering Strait between America and Asia.

Russian settlers and traders on the coasts of the White Sea, the Pomors, had been exploring parts of the northeast passage as early as the 11th century. By the 17th century they established a continuous sea route from Arkhangelsk as far east as the mouth of Yenisey. This route, known as Mangazeya seaway, after its eastern terminus, the trade depot of Mangazeya, was an early precursor to the Northern Sea Route.

== Age of Discovery ==
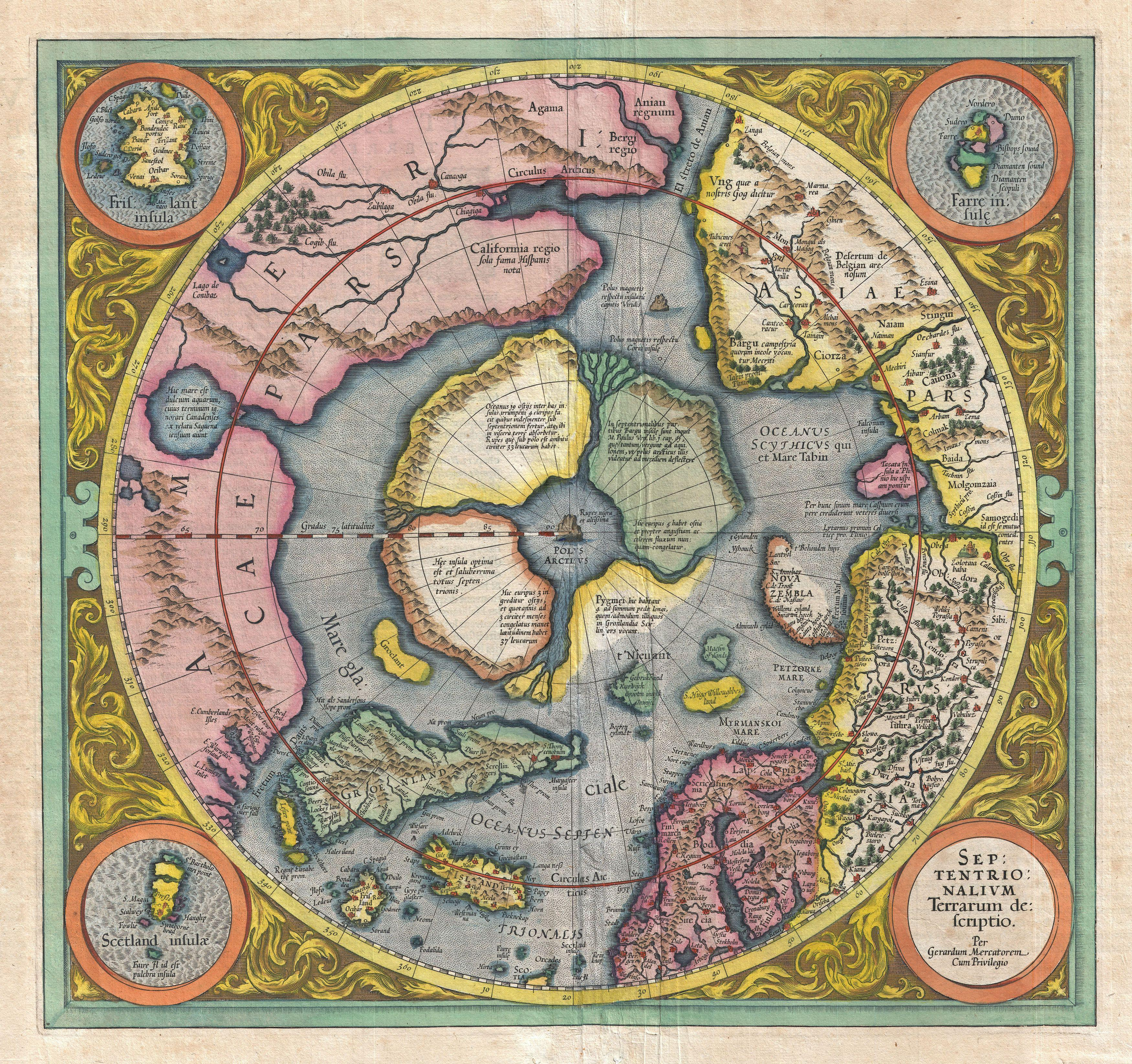
Gerardus Mercator’s map of the North Pole (1606)

Exploration to the north of the Arctic Circle in the Renaissance was both driven by the rediscovery of the Classics and the national quests for commercial expansion, and hampered by limits in maritime technology, lack of stable food supplies, and insufficient insulation for the crew against extreme cold.

=== Renaissance advancements in cartography ===
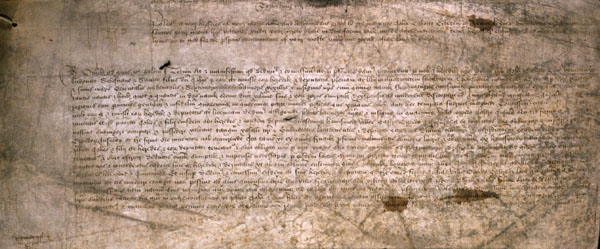
Patent from King Henry VII, authorizing John Cabot and his sons to explore new lands in the west

A seminal event in Arctic exploration occurred in 1409, when Ptolemy's Geographia was translated into Latin, thereby introducing the concepts of latitude and longitude into Western Europe. As a result navigators were better able to chart their positions. The Inventio Fortunata, a lost book, describes in a summary written by Jacobus Cnoyen but only found in a letter from Gerardus Mercator, voyages as far as the North Pole. One widely disputed claim is that two brothers from Venice, Niccolo and Antonio Zeno, allegedly made a map of their journeys to that region, which were published by their descendants in 1558.

=== Northwest Passage ===
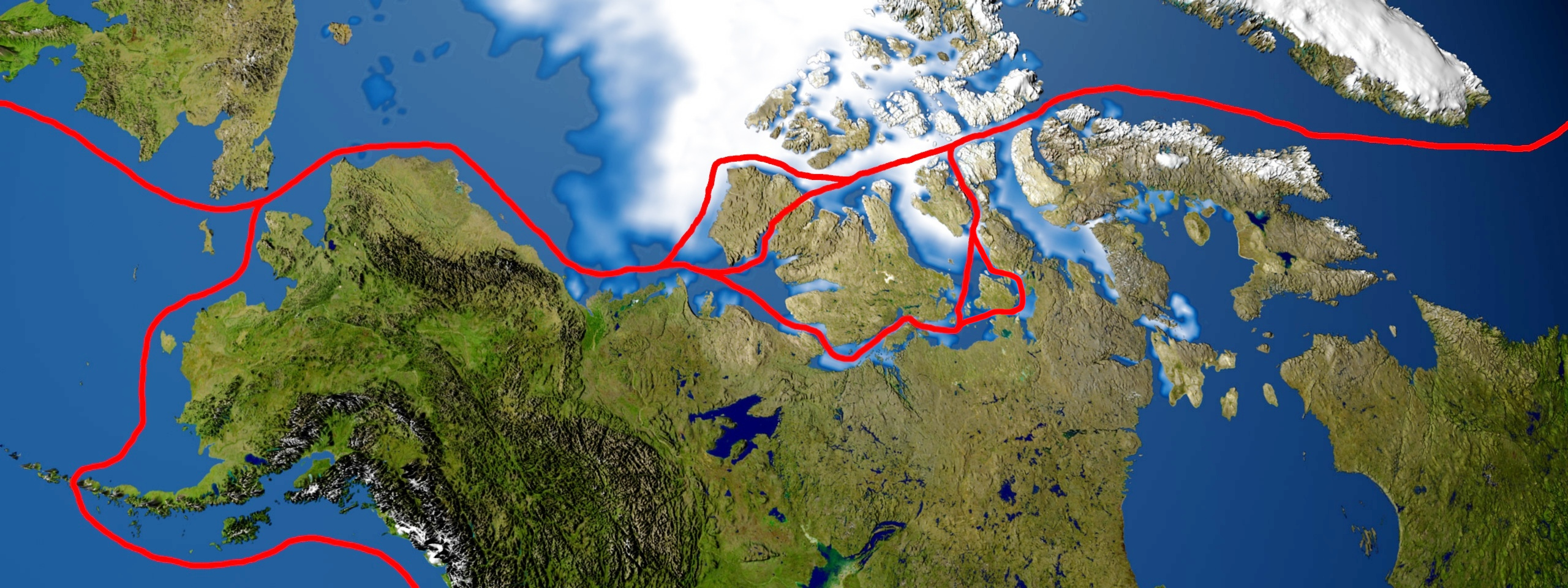
The Northwest Passage

The Northwest Passage connects the Atlantic and Pacific Oceans via the Arctic Ocean. Since the discovery of the American continent was the product of the search for a route to Asia, exploration around the northern edge of North America continued for the Northwest Passage. John Cabot's initial failure in 1497 to find a Northwest Passage across the Atlantic led the British to seek an alternative route to the east.

Interest re-kindled in 1564 after Jacques Cartier's discovery of the mouth of the Saint Lawrence River. Martin Frobisher had formed a resolution to undertake the challenge of forging a trade route from England westward to India. From 1576 to 1578, he took three trips to what is now the Canadian Arctic in order to find the passage. Frobisher Bay is named after him. In July 1583, Sir Humphrey Gilbert, who had written a treatise on the discovery of the passage and was a backer of Frobisher's, claimed the territory of Newfoundland for the English crown.

In 1585, under the employ of Elizabeth I, the English explorer John Davis entered Cumberland Sound, Baffin Island. Davis rounded Greenland before dividing his four ships into separate expeditions to search for a passage westward. Though he was unable to pass through the icy Arctic waters, he reported to his sponsors that the passage they sought is "a matter nothing doubtfull [sic]," and secured support for two additional expeditions, reaching as far as Hudson Bay.

Though England's efforts were interrupted in 1587 because of the Anglo-Spanish War, Davis's favorable reports on the region and its people would inspire explorers in the coming century. In 1609, while in the service of the Dutch East India Company, the English explorer Henry Hudson sailed up what is now called the Hudson River in search of the Passage; he reached present-day Albany, New York, before giving up. He later explored further north into the Arctic and Hudson Bay for the Passage.

=== The Northeast Passage ===
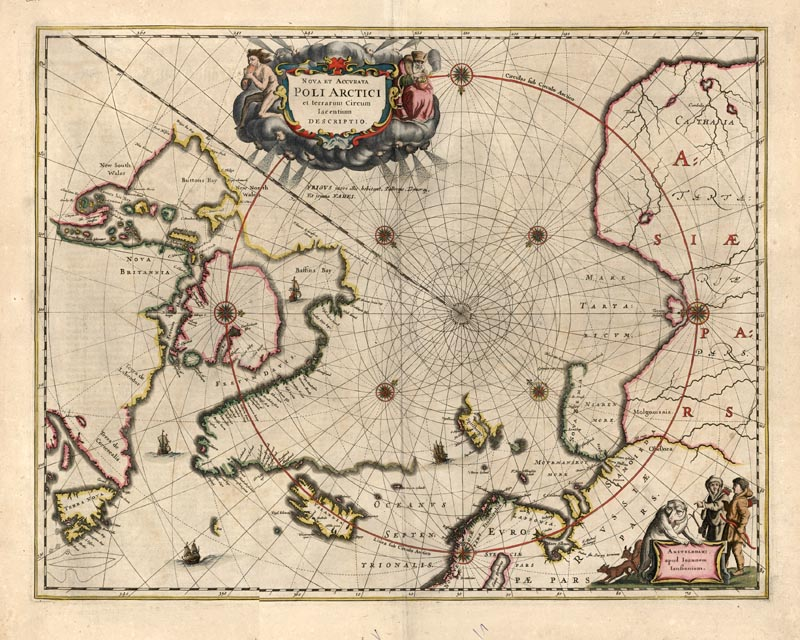
Jan Janssonius’s map of the "Poli Arctici" from 1644.

The Northeast Passage is a broad term for any route lying above the Eurasian continent and stretching between the waters north of the Norwegian Sea to the Bering Strait. The "Northern Sea Route" is defined as a specific portion of such routes. The Northern Sea Route (capitalized) as currently officially defined by Russian Federation law includes shipping lanes falling within Russia's EEZ and extending from the Kara Sea to the Bering Strait along the Russian northern coast.

The idea to explore this region was initially economic, and was first put forward by Russian diplomat Dmitry Gerasimov in 1525. The entire route lay in Arctic waters and parts and was usually covered in ice, making it a very perilous journey.

In the mid-16th century, John Cabot's son Sebastian helped organize just such an expedition, led by Sir Hugh Willoughby and Richard Chancellor. Willoughby's crew was shipwrecked off the Kola Peninsula, where they eventually died of scurvy. Chancellor and his crew made it to the mouth of the Dvina River and the town of Arkhangelsk, where they were met by a delegation from the Tsar, Ivan the Terrible. Brought back to Moscow, he launched the Muscovy Company, promoting trade between England and Russia. This diplomatic course allowed British Ambassadors such as Sir Francis Cherry the opportunity to consolidate geographic information developed by Russian merchants into maps for British exploration of the region. Some years later, Steven Borough, the master of Chancellor's ship, made it as far as the Kara Sea, when he was forced to turn back because of icy conditions.

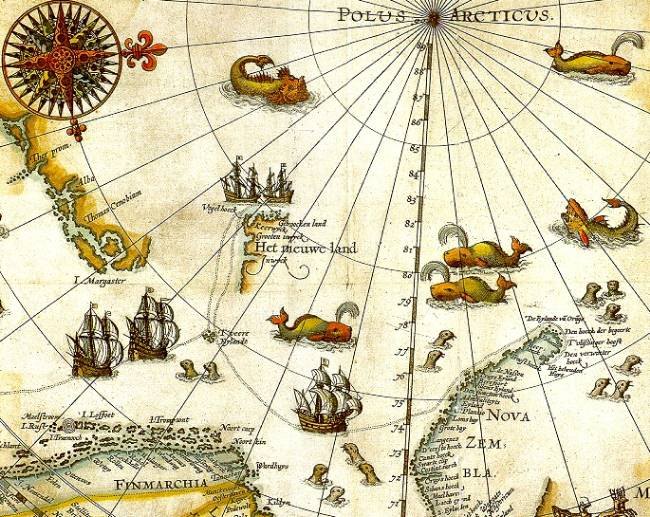
Spitsbergen and Svalbard during the Golden Age of Dutch exploration and discovery (ca. 1590s–1720s). Portion of 1599 map of Arctic exploration by Willem Barentsz. Spitsbergen, here mapped for the first time, is indicated as "Het Nieuwe Land" (Dutch for "the New Land"), center-left. This is a typical map from the Golden Age of Netherlandish cartography.

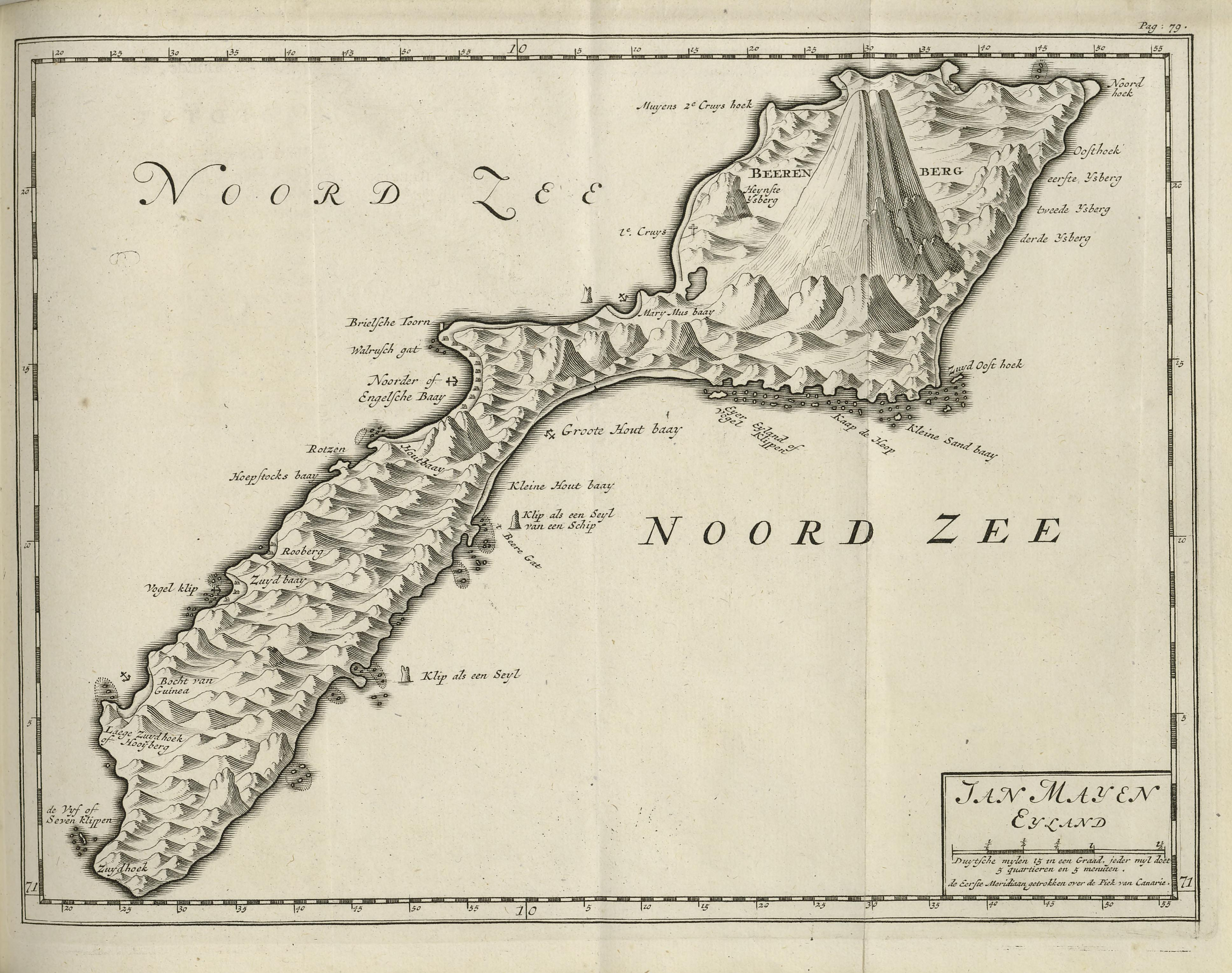
A Dutch map of Jan Mayen during the Golden Age of Dutch exploration and discovery (ca. 1590s–1720s). The Dutch were the first to undisputedly explore and chart coastlines of Jan Mayen and the Svalbard archipelago in the Arctic Ocean.

Western parts of the passage were simultaneously being explored by Northern European countries like England, the Netherlands, Denmark and Norway, looking for an alternative seaway to China and India. Most notable is the 1596 expedition led by Dutch navigator Willem Barentsz who discovered Spitsbergen and Bear Island.

Fearing English and Dutch penetration into Siberia, Russia closed the Mangazeya seaway in 1619. Pomor activity in Northern Asia declined and the bulk of exploration in the 17th century was carried out by Siberian Cossacks, sailing from one river mouth to another in their Arctic-worthy kochs. In 1648 the most famous of these expeditions, led by Fedot Alekseev and Semyon Dezhnev, sailed east from the mouth of Kolyma to the Pacific and doubled the Chukchi Peninsula, thus proving that there was no land connection between Asia and North America. Eighty years after Dezhnev, in 1728, another Russian explorer, Danish-born Vitus Bering on Sviatoy Gavriil made a similar voyage in reverse, starting in Kamchatka and going north to the passage that now bears his name (Bering Strait). It was Bering who gave their current names to Diomede Islands, discovered and first described by Dezhnev.

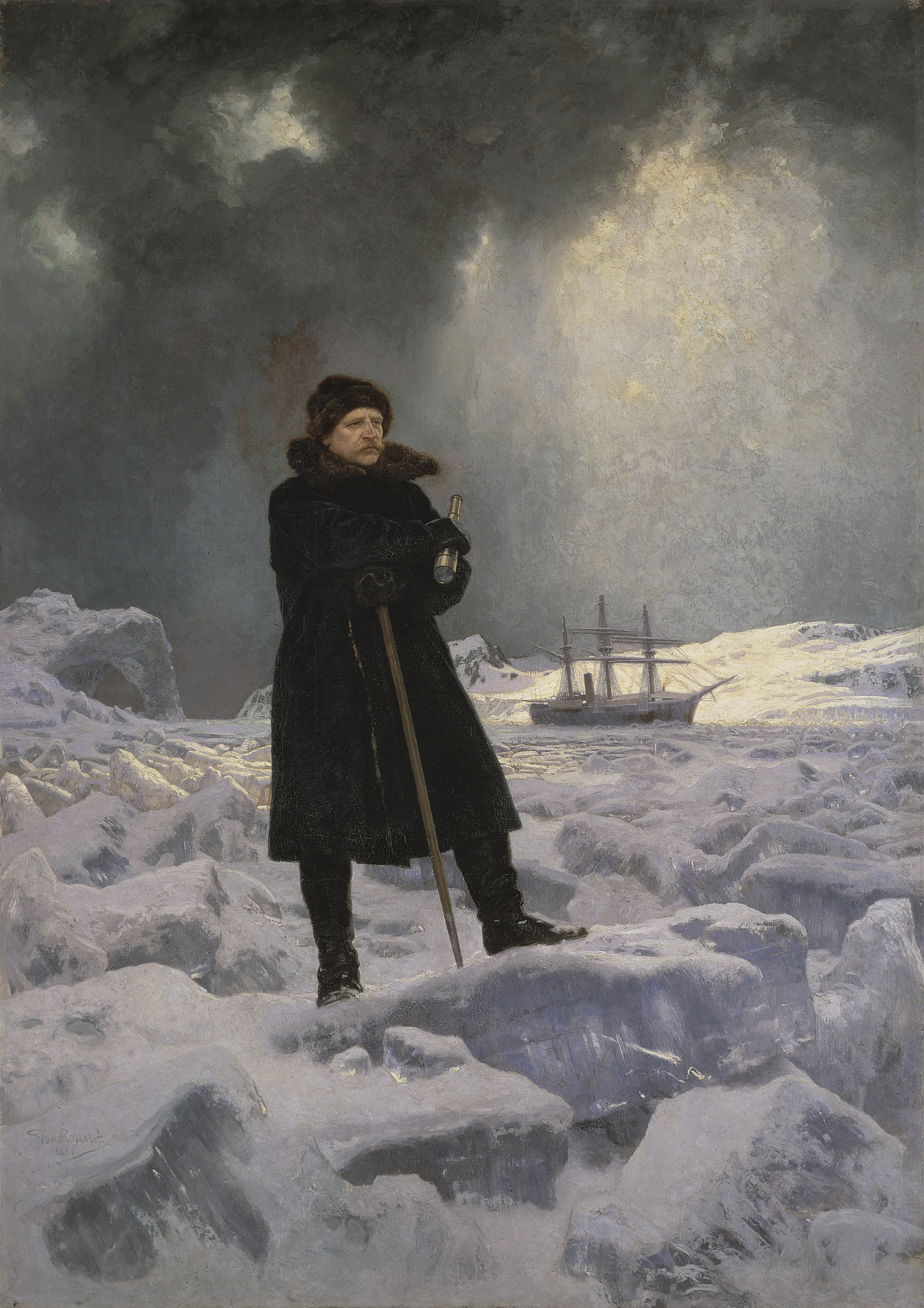
Adolf Erik Nordenskiöld with the Vega. Georg von Rosen (1886)

It was not until in 1878 that Finnish-Swedish explorer Adolf Erik Nordenskiöld made the first complete passage of the North East Passage from west to east, in the Vega expedition. The ship's captain on this expedition was Lieutenant Louis Palander of the Swedish Royal Navy.

== Northwest Passage ==
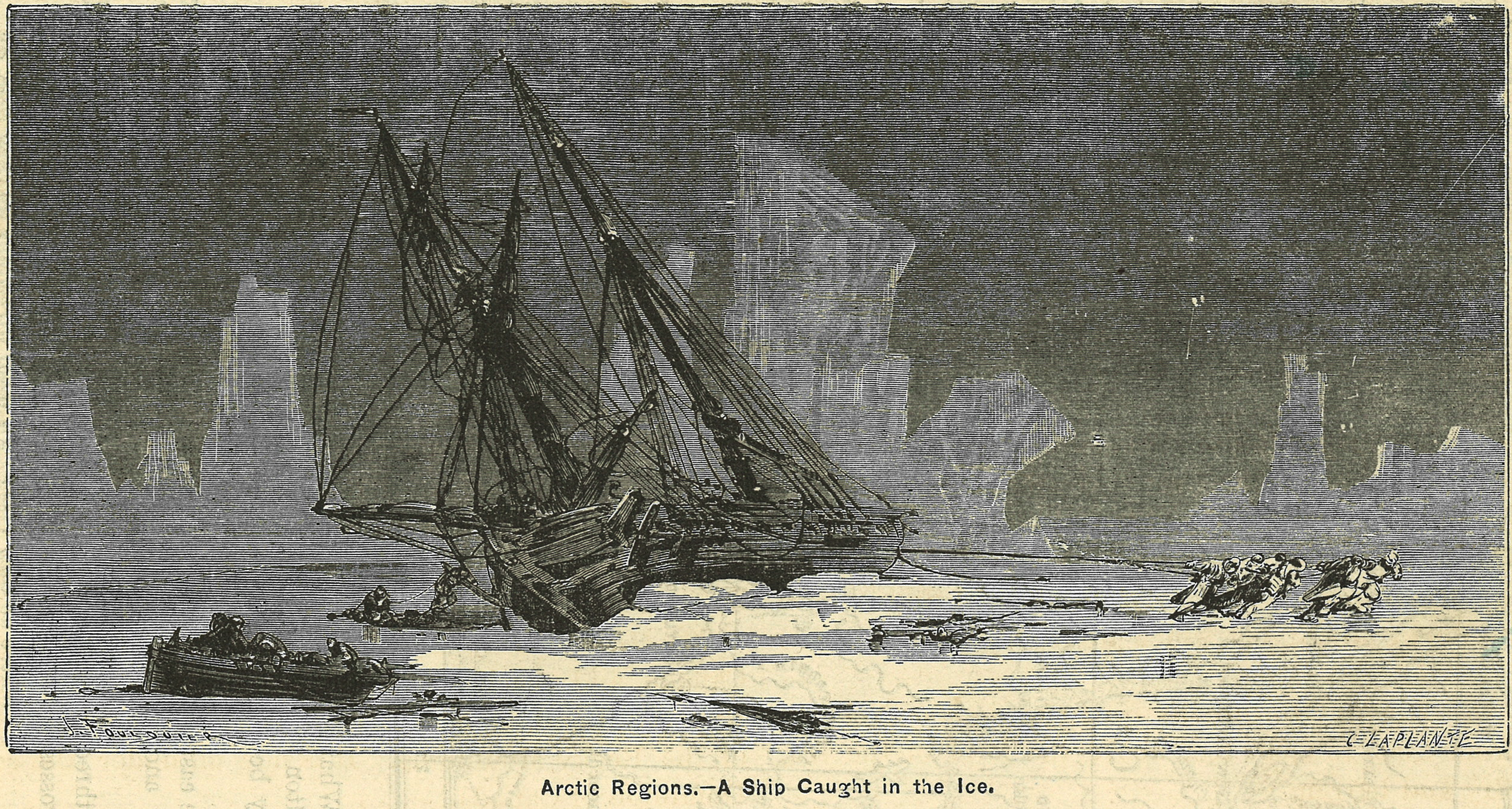
Sailing Ship in Arctic Regions

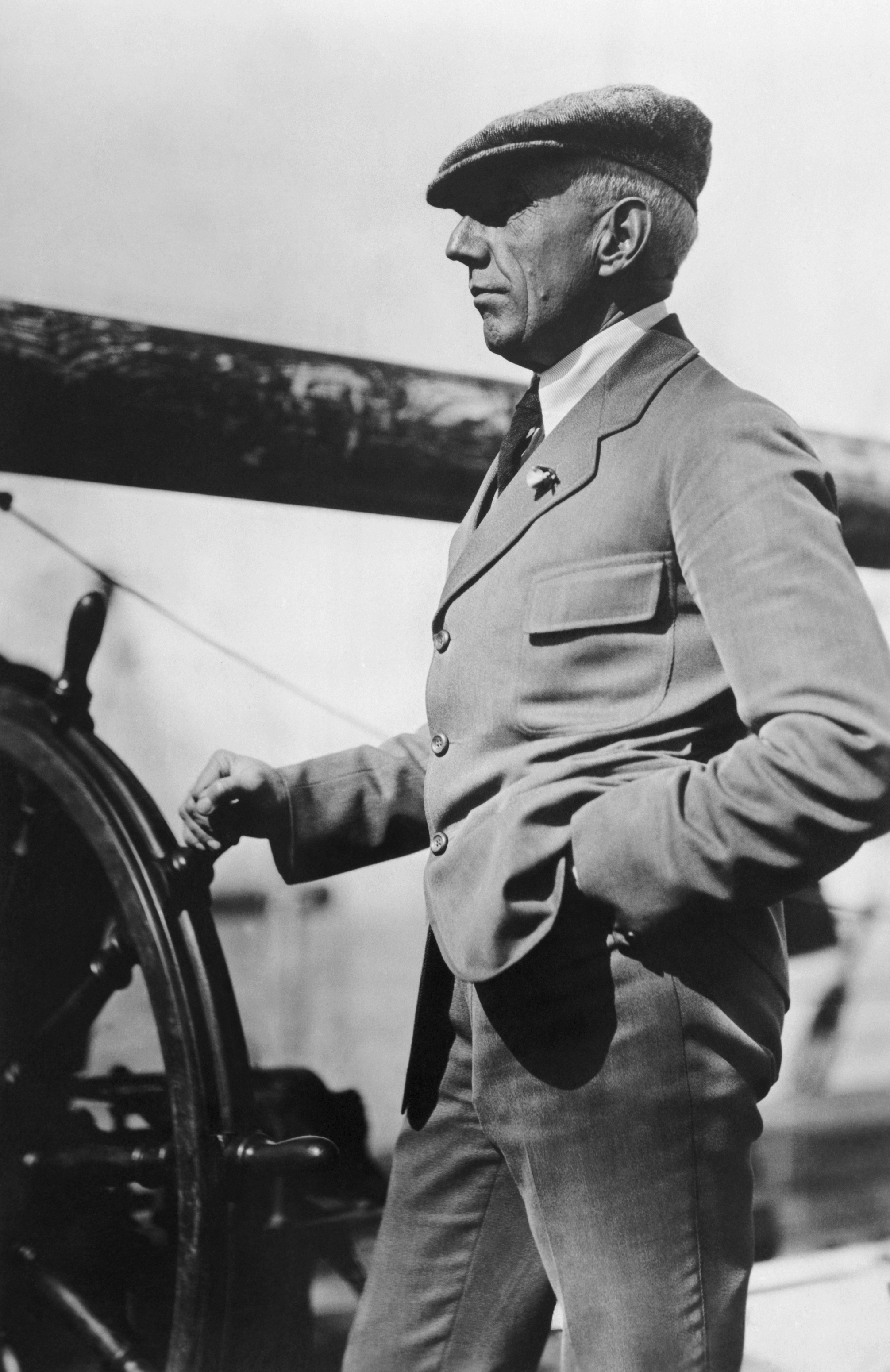
Roald Amundsen led the first expedition to reach the South Pole, was the first person to reach both poles, and was the first person to traverse the Northwest Passage.

In the first half of the 19th century, parts of the Northwest Passage were explored separately by a number of different expeditions, including those by John Ross, William Edward Parry, James Clark Ross; and overland expeditions led by John Franklin, George Back, Peter Warren Dease, Thomas Simpson, and John Rae. Sir Robert McClure was credited with the discovery of the Northwest Passage by sea in 1851 when he looked across M'Clure Strait from Banks Island and viewed Melville Island. However, the strait was blocked by young ice at this point in the season, and not navigable to ships. The only usable route, linking the entrances of Lancaster Sound and Dolphin and Union Strait was first used by John Rae in 1851. Rae used a pragmatic approach of traveling by land on foot and dog sled, and typically employed less than ten people in his exploration parties. At this time, Arctic exploration was catching the interest of the public, notably in Britain, and many articles and images circulated among the many journals interested in travelogues.

The Northwest Passage was not completely conquered by sea until 1906, when the Norwegian explorer Roald Amundsen, who had sailed just in time to escape creditors seeking to stop the expedition, completed a three-year voyage in the converted 47-ton herring boat Gjøa. At the end of this trip, he walked into the city of Eagle, Alaska, and sent a telegram announcing his success. His route was not commercially practical; in addition to the time taken, some of the waterways were extremely shallow.

Knud Rasmussen (1879–1933) led several Arctic expeditions. He grew up in Greenland speaking Greenlandic and Danish, and has been called the "father of Eskimology" and was the first Greenlander of Inuit and European descent to cross the Northwest Passage via dog sled. Rasmussen and his friend Peter Freuchen participated in seven Thule Expeditions, named after ultima Thule, and wrote numerous books on their Arctic experiences.

=== The North Pole ===
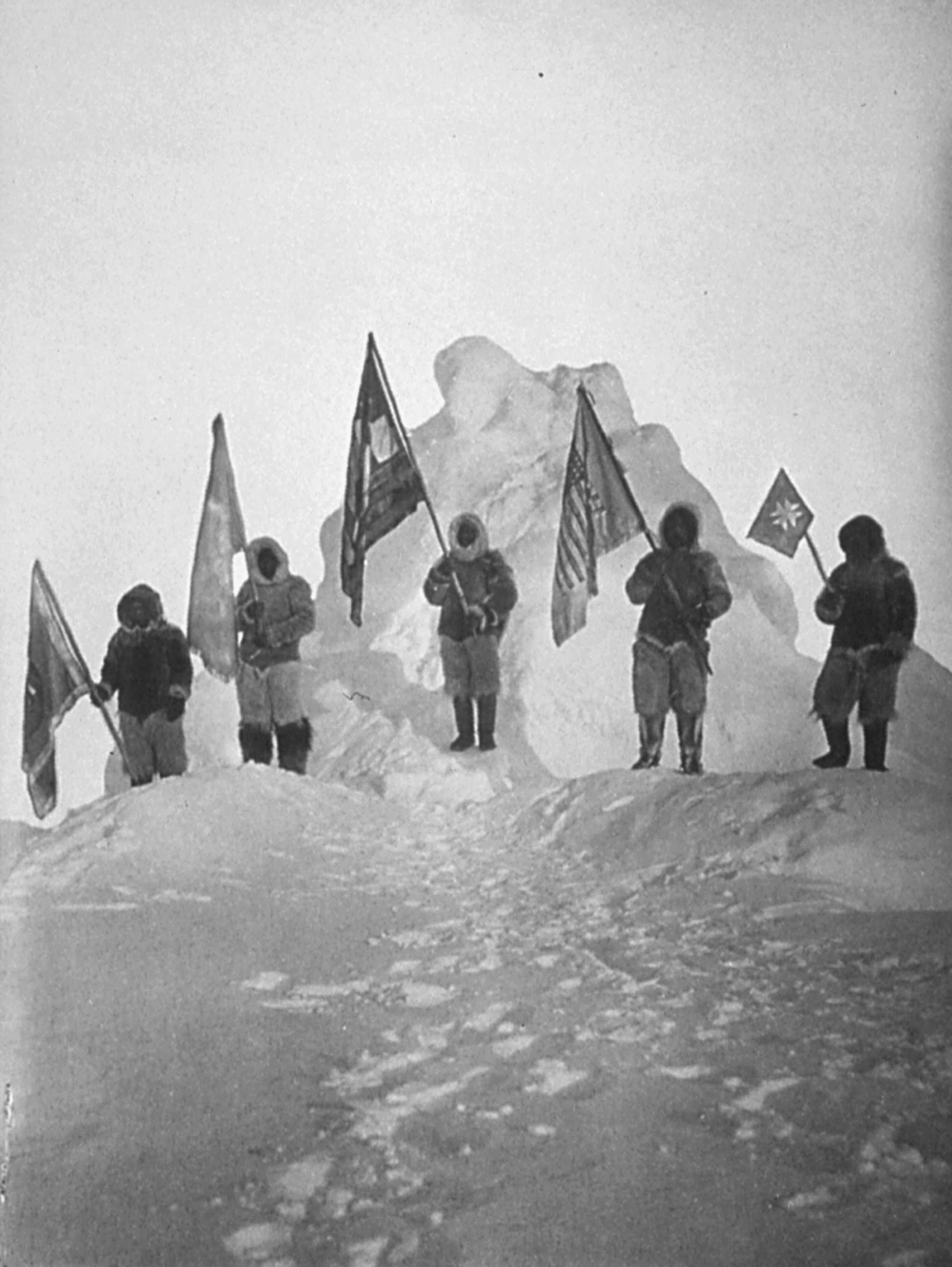
Robert Peary and sledge party with flags at North Pole. Peary has been claimed to be the first person to reach the North Pole.

On April 6, 1909, Robert Peary claimed to be the first person in recorded history to reach the North Pole (although whether he actually reached the Pole is disputed). He traveled with the aid of dogsleds and three separate support crews who turned back at successive intervals before reaching the Pole. Many modern explorers, including Olympic skiers using modern equipment, contend that Peary could not have reached the pole on foot in the time he claimed.

A number of previous expeditions set out with the intention of reaching the North Pole but did not succeed; that of British naval officer William Edward Parry in 1827, the tragic American Polaris expedition under Charles Francis Hall in 1871, the ill-fated Jeannette expedition commanded by US Navy Lieutenant Commander George W. De Long in 1879, and the Norwegian Fram expedition of Fridtjof Nansen in 1895. American Frederick Cook claimed to have reached the North Pole in 1908, but this has not been widely accepted.

On May 9, 1926, Americans Richard E. Byrd and Floyd Bennett claimed to have flown over the North Pole in a Fokker F.VIIa/3m Tri-motor monoplane. However, their claim to have reached the Pole is disputed.

The crew of the airship Norge (including Roald Amundsen and the American sponsor Lincoln Ellsworth) flew over the Pole on May 12, 1926. This is the first undisputed sighting of the Pole. Norge was designed and piloted by the Italian Umberto Nobile, who overflew the Pole a second time on May 24, 1928. Nobile's second trip was in the airship Italia that ran into a storm on the return trip and crashed on the ice. Survivors were eventually recovered. Amundsen disappeared, with the crew of his sea plane, during the rescue operations.

The first people to have without doubt walked on the North Pole were the Soviet party of 1948 under the command of Aleksandr Kuznetsov, who landed their aircraft nearby and walked to the pole.

On August 3, 1958, the American submarine USS Nautilus (SSN-571) reached the North Pole without surfacing. It then proceeded to travel under the entire Polar ice cap. On March 17, 1959, the USS Skate (SSN-578) surfaced on the North Pole and dispersed the ashes of explorer Sir Hubert Wilkins. These journeys were part of military explorations stimulated by the Cold War context.

On April 19, 1968, Ralph Plaisted reached the North Pole via snowmobile, the first surface traveler known with certainty to have done so. His position was verified independently by a US Air Force meteorological overflight. In 1969 Wally Herbert, on foot and by dog sled, became the first man to reach the North Pole on muscle power alone, on the 60th anniversary of Robert Peary's famous but disputed expedition.

The first persons to reach the North Pole on foot (or skis) and return with no outside help, no dogs, airplanes, or re-supplies were Richard Weber (Canada) and Misha Malakhov (Russia) in 1995. No one has completed this journey since.

U.S. Air Force Lieutenant Colonel Joseph O. Fletcher and Lieutenant William Pershing Benedict landed a plane at the Pole on May 3, 1952, accompanied by the scientist Albert P. Crary.

On 2 May 2007, BBC's Top Gear reached the 1996 position of the magnetic north pole (78°35.7′N 104°11.9′W) in a modified Toyota Hilux.

On 2 August 2007, during Arktika 2007 Russian crewed submersibles were the first to descend to the seabed below the pole.

On April 26, 2009, Vassily Elagin, Afanassi Makovnev, Vladimir Obikhod, Sergey Larin, Alexey Ushakov, Alexey Shkrabkin and Nikolay Nikulshin after 38 days and over 2,000 km (1,200 mi) (starting from Sredniy Island, Severnaya Zemlya) drove two Russian built cars "Yemelya-1" and "Yemelya-2" to the North Pole.

== See also ==
- Farthest North
- List of polar explorers
- List of Arctic expeditions
- List of Arctic exploration vessels
- List of firsts at the Geographic North Pole
- Great Northern Expedition
- List of Antarctic expeditions
- Heroic Age of Antarctic Exploration
  - List of Antarctic exploration ships from the Heroic Age, 1897–1922
- History of Antarctica
- History of research ships
- List of Russian explorers
- Timeline of European exploration
- Drifting ice station
- Deep-sea exploration
- Space exploration
- Nikolai Pinegin

== Notes ==
=== Bibliography ===
- Berton, Pierre (1989) [1988]. The Arctic Grail: The Quest for the North West Passage and the North Pole, 1818-1909. New York, NY: Penguin Books. ISBN 978-0-14-011680-9.
- Edinger, Ray (2014). Love and Ice: The Tragic Obsessions of Dr. Elisha Kent Kane, Arctic Explorer. Savannah, Georgia: Frederic C. Beil. ISBN 978-1-929490-38-7.
- McCannon, John (2012). A History of the Arctic: Nature, Exploration and Exploitation. London: Reaktion Books. ISBN 978-1-78023-076-4.
- McCannon, John (1998). Red Arctic: Polar Exploration and the Myth of the North in the Soviet Union, 1932-1939. New York: Oxford University Press. ISBN 978-0-19-511436-2.
- Robinson, Michael F. (2006). The Coldest Crucible: Arctic Exploration and American Culture. Chicago: University of Chicago Press. ISBN 978-0-226-72187-3.
- Sale, Richard (2002). To the Ends of the Earth: The History of Polar Exploration. London: HarperCollins. ISBN 978-0-00-711124-4. OCLC 48836382.
- Shnirelman, Victor (2007). "Archaeology, Russian Nationalism, and the 'Arctic Homeland'". In Kohl, Philip L.; Kozelsky, Mara; Ben-Yehuda, Nachman (eds.). Selective Remembrances: Archaeology in the Construction, Commemoration, and Consecration of National Pasts. Chicago: University of Chicago Press. pp. 31–70. ISBN 978-0-226-45058-2. Also: Selective Remembrances at Google Books.
- Simmons, George (1965). Target: Arctic; Men in the Skies at the Top of the World. Chilton Books. OCLC 486837.
