= MLAE-2009 =

2009 Russian Arctic expedition

In 2009, the Marine Live-ice Automobile Expedition (MLAE) successfully traversed 2,033 km (1,263 mi) the Arctic waters and ice between Ostrov Sredniy island of the Severnaya Zemlya archipelago and the North Pole. The route took 38 days between 20 March and 26 April 2009.

The expedition was headed by Russian explorer Vasily Yelagin, accompanied by six others: Afanasy Makovnev, Vladimir Obihod, Sergey Larin, Alexey Shkrabkin, Alexey Ushakov, and Nikolai Nikulshin.

Vasily Elagin also engineered and built the two Yemelya 6x6 vehicles, Yemelya 1 and Yemelya 2, which had Diesel engines, low-pressure tires, and cargo trailers.

The expedition was carried out under the patronage of the Russian president’s special representative for international cooperation in The Arctic Artur Chilingarov. The support and safety monitoring of the expedition and the crew was provided by the aviation department of the Federal Security Service.

The Russian Book of Records recorded MLAE 2009 as the first expedition to reach the Geographic North Pole in wheeled land vehicles.

A subsequent expedition, MLAE-2011, followed two years later.
