= North Pole =

Northernmost point on Earth

An azimuthal projection showing the Arctic Ocean and the North Pole. The map also shows the 75th parallel north and 60th parallel north.

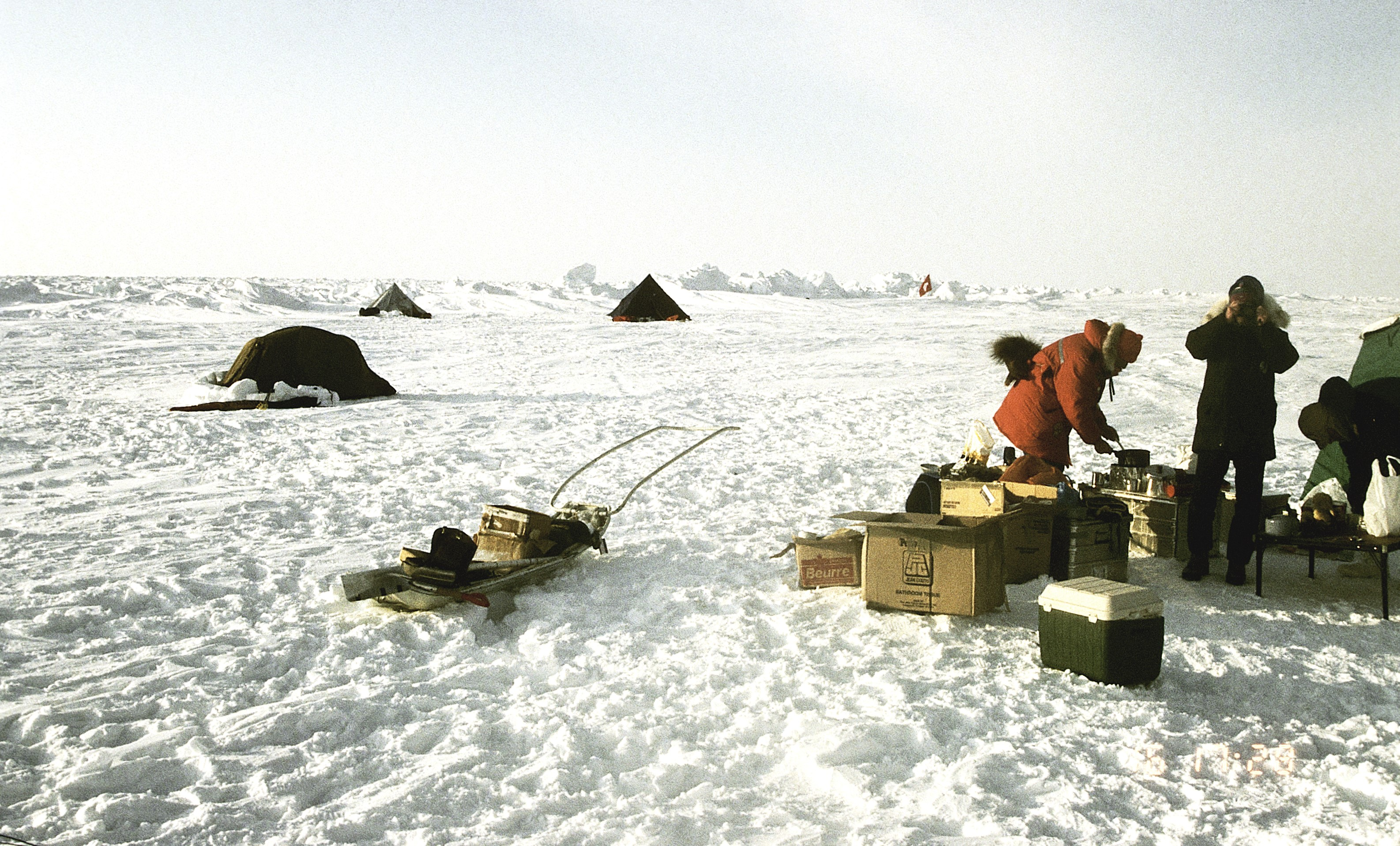
Temporary research station of German-Swiss expedition on the sea ice at the Geographic North Pole. Drillings at the landing site at 90°N showed an average ice thickness of 2.5 m (8 ft 2 in) on April 16, 1990

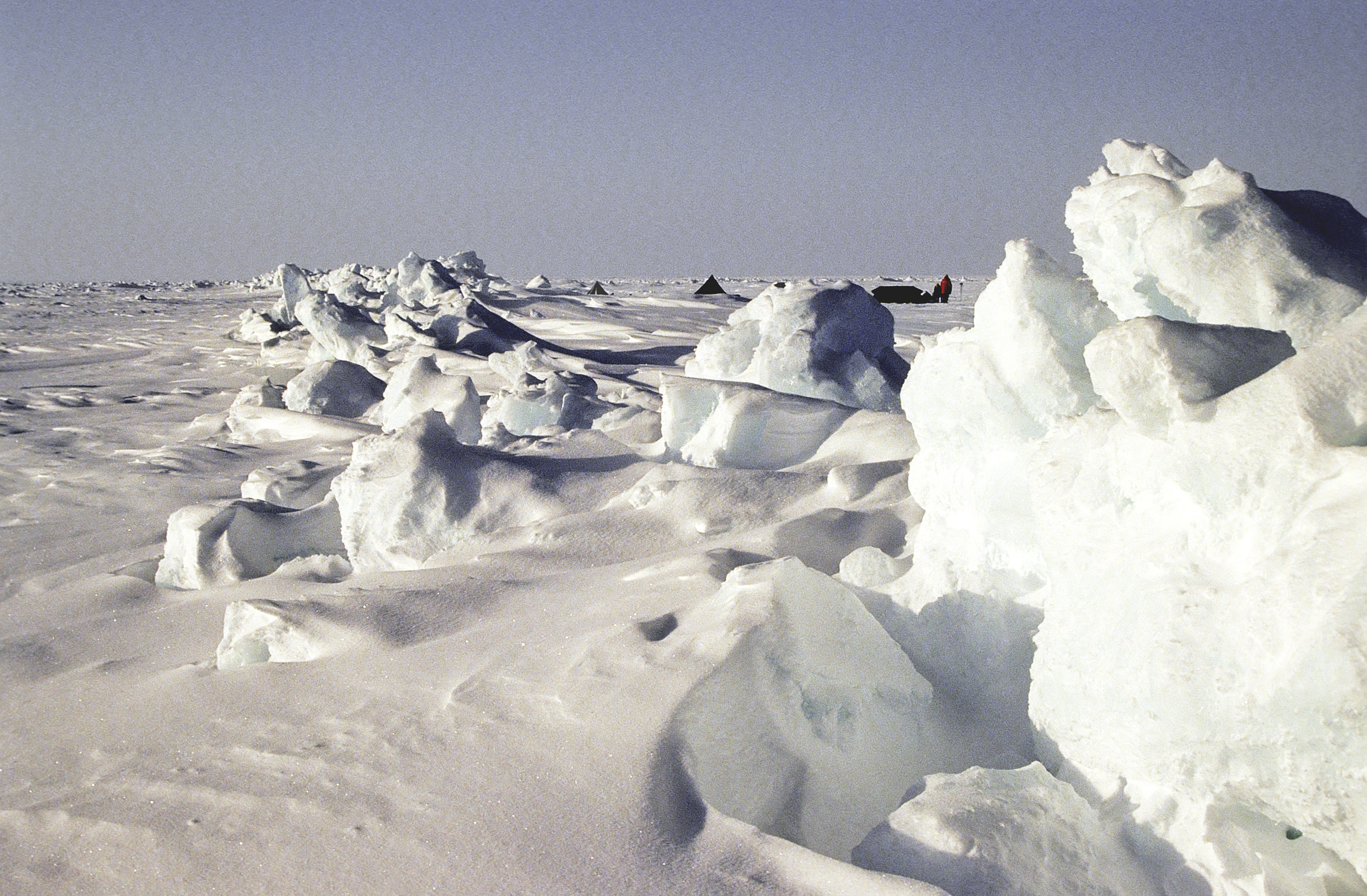
This pressure ridge at the North Pole is about 1 km (1/2 mi) long, formed between two ice floes of multi-year ice.

The North Pole, also known as the Geographic North Pole or Terrestrial North Pole, is the point in the Northern Hemisphere where the Earth's axis of rotation meets its surface. It is called the True North Pole to distinguish from the magnetic north pole.

The North Pole is by definition the northernmost point on the Earth, lying antipodally to the South Pole. It defines geodetic latitude 90° North, as well as the direction of true north. At the North Pole all directions point south; all lines of longitude converge there, so its longitude can be defined as any degree value. No time zone has been assigned to the North Pole, so any time can be used as the local time. Along tight latitude circles, counterclockwise is east and clockwise is west. The North Pole is at the center of the Northern Hemisphere. The nearest land is usually said to be Kaffeklubben Island, off the northern coast of Greenland about 700 km (430 mi) away, though some perhaps semi-permanent gravel banks lie slightly closer. The nearest permanently inhabited place is Alert on Ellesmere Island, Canada, which is located 817 km (508 mi) from the Pole.

While the South Pole lies on a continental land mass, the North Pole is located in the middle of the Arctic Ocean amid waters that are almost permanently covered with constantly shifting sea ice. The sea depth at the North Pole has been measured at 4,261 m (13,980 ft) by the Russian Mir submersible in 2007 and at 4,087 m (13,409 ft) by USS Nautilus in 1958. This makes it impractical to construct a permanent station at the North Pole (unlike the South Pole). However, the Soviet Union, and later Russia, constructed a number of manned drifting stations on a generally annual basis since 1937, some of which have passed over or very close to the Pole. Since 2002, a group of Russians have also annually established a private base, Barneo, close to the Pole. This operates for a few weeks during early spring. Studies in the 2000s predicted that the North Pole may become seasonally ice-free because of Arctic ice shrinkage, with timescales varying from 2016 to the late 21st century or later.

Attempts to reach the North Pole began in the late 19th century, with the record for "Farthest North" being surpassed on numerous occasions. The first undisputed expedition to reach the North Pole was that of the airship Norge, which overflew the area in 1926 with 16 men on board, including expedition leader Roald Amundsen. Three prior expeditions – led by Frederick Cook (1908, land), Robert Peary (1909, land) and Richard E. Byrd (1926, aerial) – were once also accepted as having reached the Pole. However, in each case later analysis of expedition data has cast doubt upon the accuracy of their claims.

The first verified individuals to reach the North Pole on foot was in 1948 by a 24-man Soviet party, part of Aleksandr Kuznetsov's Sever-2 expedition to the Arctic, who flew near to the Pole first before making the final trek to the Pole on foot. The first complete land expedition to reach the North Pole was in 1968 by Ralph Plaisted, Walt Pederson, Gerry Pitzl and Jean-Luc Bombardier, using snowmobiles and with air support.

== Precise definition ==
The Earth's axis of rotation – and hence the position of the North Pole – was commonly believed to be fixed (relative to the surface of the Earth) until, in the 18th century, the mathematician Leonhard Euler predicted that the axis might "wobble" slightly. Around the beginning of the 20th century astronomers noticed a small apparent "variation of latitude", as determined for a fixed point on Earth from the observation of stars. Part of this variation could be attributed to a wandering of the Pole across the Earth's surface, by a range of a few metres. The wandering has several periodic components and an irregular component. The component with a period of about 435 days is identified with the eight-month wandering predicted by Euler and is now called the Chandler wobble after its discoverer. The exact point of intersection of the Earth's axis and the Earth's surface, at any given moment, is called the "instantaneous pole", but because of the "wobble" this cannot be used as a definition of a fixed North Pole (or South Pole) when metre-scale precision is required.

It is desirable to tie the system of Earth coordinates (latitude, longitude, and elevations or orography) to fixed landforms. However, given plate tectonics and isostasy, there is no system in which all geographic features are fixed. Yet the International Earth Rotation and Reference Systems Service and the International Astronomical Union have defined a framework called the International Terrestrial Reference System.

== Exploration ==
=== Pre-1900 ===
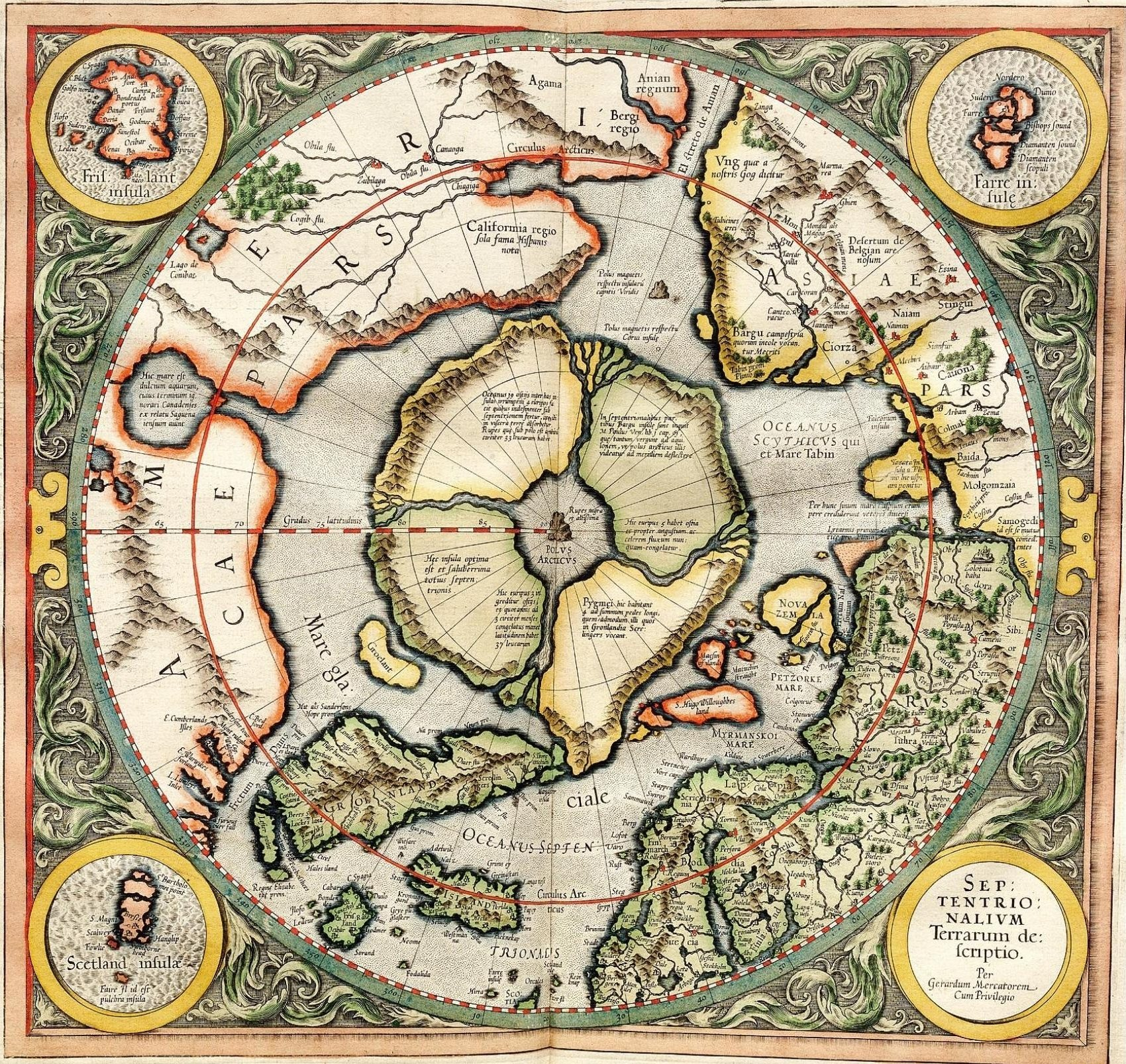
Gerardus Mercator's map of the North Pole from 1595

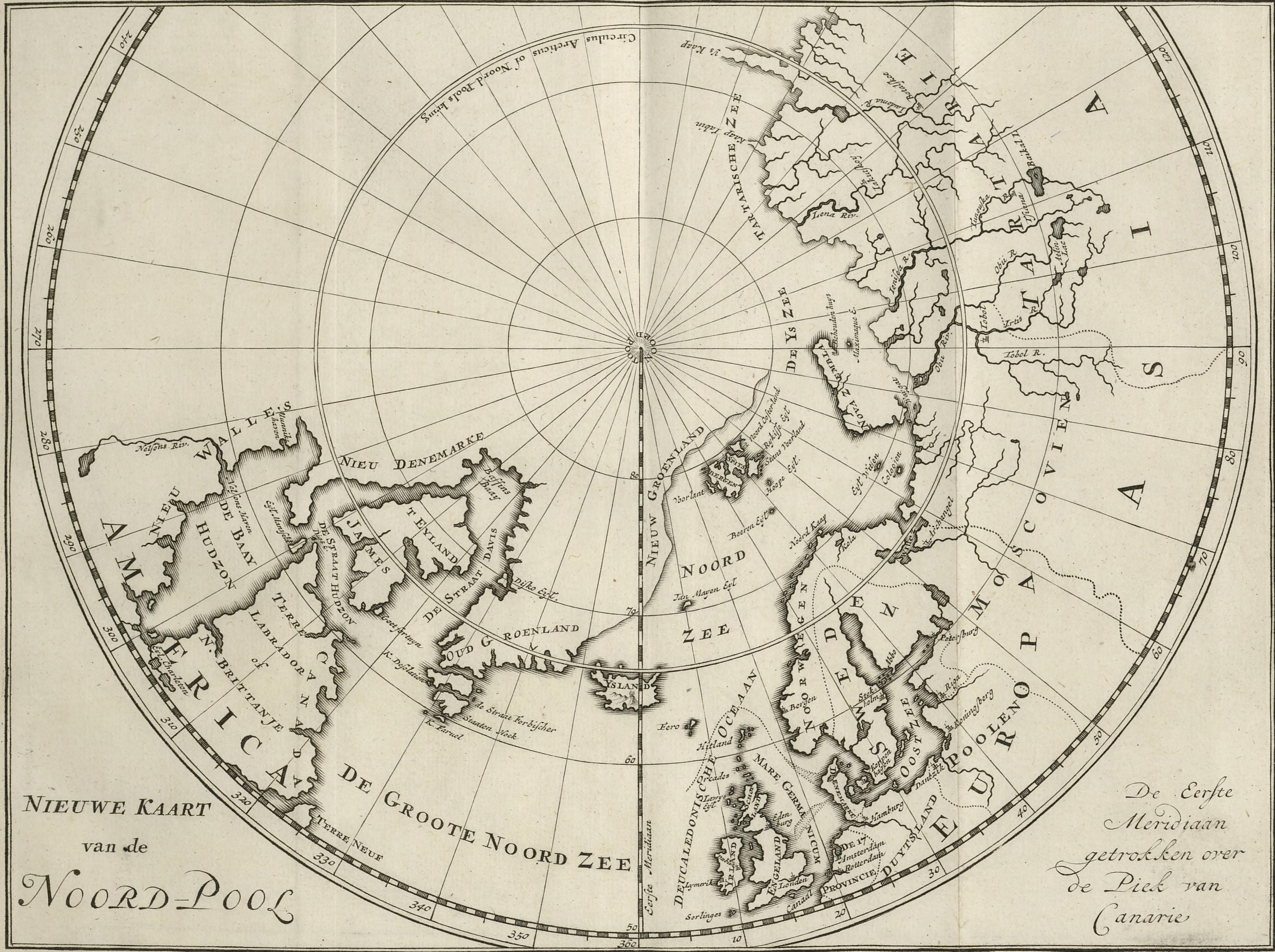
C.G. Zorgdragers map of the North Pole from 1720

As early as the 16th century, many prominent people correctly believed that the North Pole was in a sea, which in the 19th century was called the Polynya or Open Polar Sea. It was therefore hoped that passage could be found through ice floes at favorable times of the year. Several expeditions set out to find the way, generally with whaling ships, already commonly used in the cold northern latitudes.

One of the earliest expeditions to set out with the explicit intention of reaching the North Pole was that of British naval officer William Edward Parry, who in 1827 reached latitude 82°45′ North. In 1871, the Polaris expedition, a U.S. attempt on the Pole led by Charles Francis Hall, ended in disaster. Another British Royal Navy attempt to get to the pole, part of the British Arctic Expedition, by Commander Albert H. Markham reached a then-record 83°20'26" North in May 1876 before turning back. An 1879–1881 expedition commanded by U.S. Navy officer George W. De Long ended when their ship, the USS Jeannette, was crushed by ice. Over half the crew, including De Long, were lost.

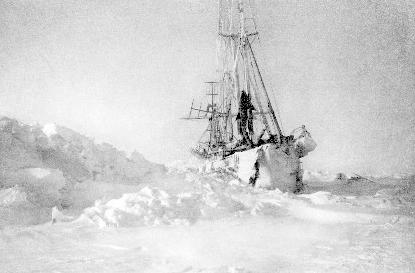
Nansen's ship Fram in the Arctic ice

In April 1895, the Norwegian explorers Fridtjof Nansen and Hjalmar Johansen struck out for the Pole on skis after leaving Nansen's icebound ship Fram. The pair reached latitude 86°14′ North before they abandoned the attempt and turned southwards, eventually reaching Franz Josef Land.

In 1897, Swedish engineer Salomon August Andrée and two companions tried to reach the North Pole in the hydrogen balloon Örnen ("Eagle"), but came down 300 km (190 mi) north of Kvitøya, the northeasternmost part of the Svalbard archipelago. They trekked to Kvitøya but died there three months after their crash. In 1930 the remains of this expedition were found by the Norwegian Bratvaag Expedition.

The Italian explorer Luigi Amedeo, Duke of the Abruzzi and Captain Umberto Cagni of the Italian Royal Navy (Regia Marina) sailed the converted whaler Stella Polare ("Pole Star") from Norway in 1899. On 11 March 1900, Cagni led a party over the ice and reached latitude 86° 34’ on 25 April, setting a new record by beating Nansen's result of 1895 by 35 to 40 km (22 to 25 mi). Cagni barely managed to return to the camp, remaining there until 23 June. On 16 August, the Stella Polare left Rudolf Island heading south and the expedition returned to Norway.

=== 1900–1940 ===
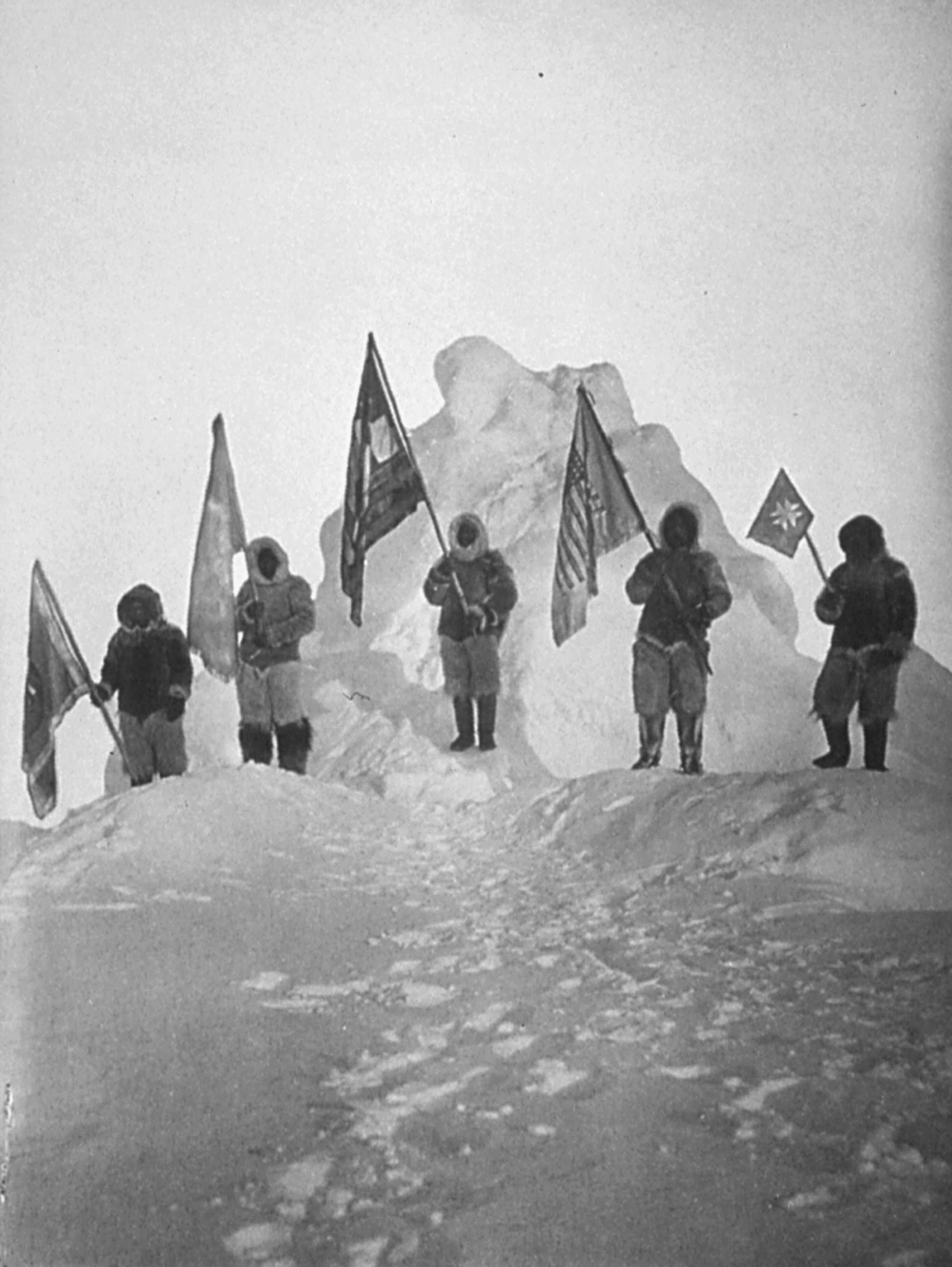
Peary's sledge party at what they claimed was the North Pole, 1909. From left: Ooqueah, Ootah, Henson, Egingwah, and Seeglo.

The U.S. explorer Frederick Cook claimed to have reached the North Pole on 21 April 1908 with two Inuit men, Ahwelah and Etukishook, but he was unable to produce convincing proof and his claim is not widely accepted.

The conquest of the North Pole was for many years credited to U.S. Navy engineer Robert Peary, who claimed to have reached the Pole on 6 April 1909, accompanied by Matthew Henson and four Inuit men, Ootah, Seeglo, Egingwah, and Ooqueah. However, Peary's claim remains highly disputed and controversial. Those who accompanied Peary on the final stage of the journey were not trained in navigation, and thus could not independently confirm his navigational work, which some claim to have been particularly sloppy as he approached the Pole.

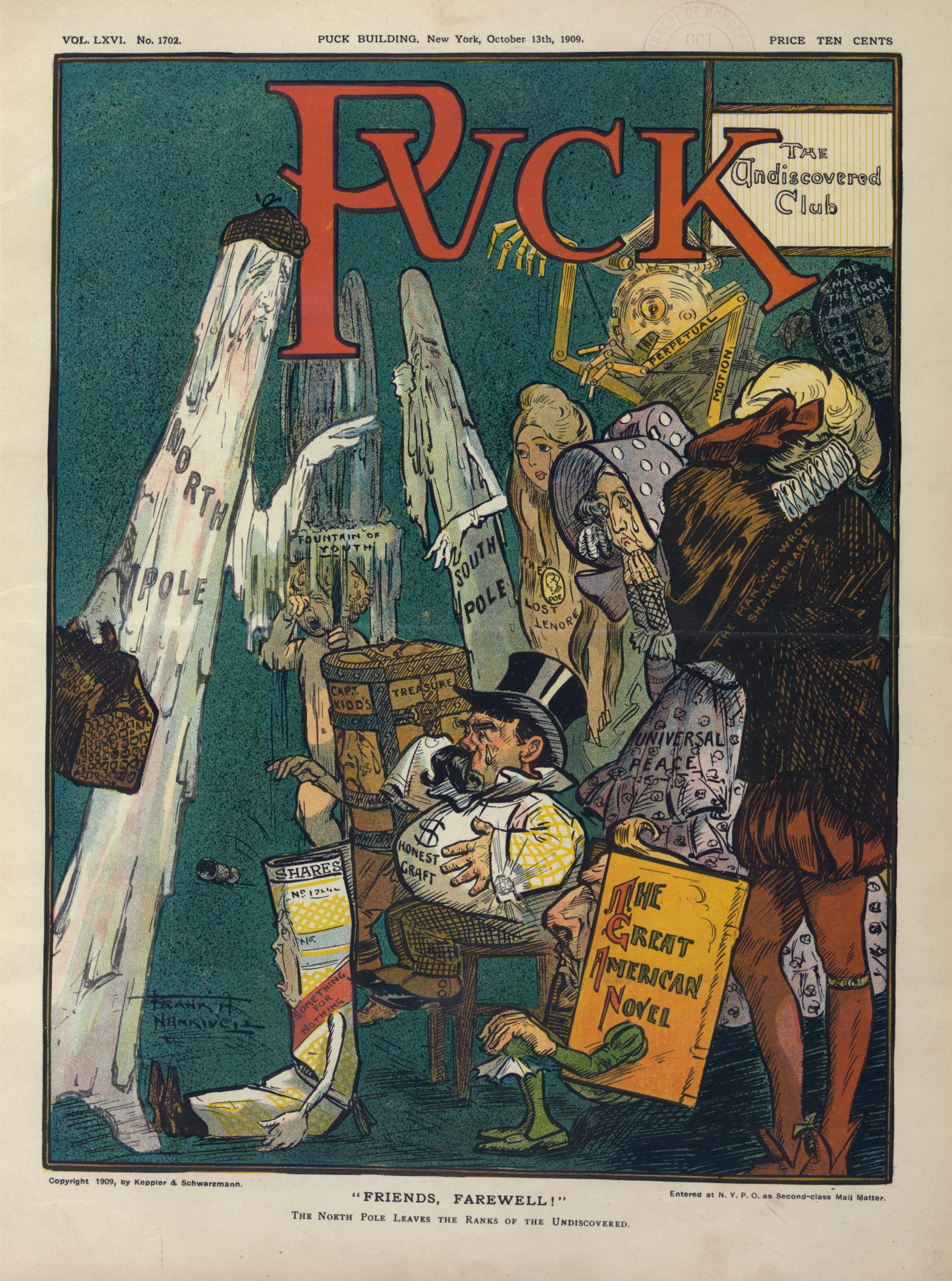
Although heavily disputed by modern historians, Peary & his team were given credit for the discovery of the North Pole by the contemporary press.

The distances and speeds that Peary claimed to have achieved once the last support party turned back seem incredible to many people, almost three times that which he had accomplished up to that point. Peary's account of a journey to the Pole and back while traveling along the direct line – the only strategy that is consistent with the time constraints that he was facing – is contradicted by Henson's account of tortuous detours to avoid pressure ridges and open leads.

The British explorer Wally Herbert, initially a supporter of Peary, researched Peary's records in 1989 and found that there were significant discrepancies in the explorer's navigational records. He concluded that Peary had not reached the Pole. Support for Peary came again in 2005, however, when British explorer Tom Avery and four companions recreated the outward portion of Peary's journey with replica wooden sleds and Canadian Eskimo Dog teams, reaching the North Pole in 36 days, 22 hours – nearly five hours faster than Peary. However, Avery's fastest 5-day march was 90 nautical miles (170 km), significantly short of the 135 nautical miles (250 km) claimed by Peary. Avery writes on his web site that "The admiration and respect which I hold for Robert Peary, Matthew Henson and the four Inuit men who ventured North in 1909, has grown enormously since we set out from Cape Columbia. Having now seen for myself how he travelled across the pack ice, I am more convinced than ever that Peary did indeed discover the North Pole."

The first claimed flight over the Pole was made on 9 May 1926 by U.S. naval officer Richard E. Byrd and pilot Floyd Bennett in a Fokker tri-motor aircraft. Although verified at the time by a committee of the National Geographic Society, this claim has since been undermined by the 1996 revelation that Byrd's long-hidden diary's solar sextant data (which the NGS never checked) consistently contradict his June 1926 report's parallel data by over 100 mi (160 km). The secret report's alleged en-route solar sextant data were inadvertently so impossibly overprecise that he excised all these alleged raw solar observations out of the version of the report finally sent to geographical societies five months later (while the original version was hidden for 70 years), a realization first published in 2000 by the University of Cambridge after scrupulous refereeing.

The first consistent, verified, and scientifically convincing attainment of the Pole was on 12 May 1926, by Norwegian explorer Roald Amundsen and his U.S. sponsor Lincoln Ellsworth from the airship Norge. Norge, though Norwegian-owned, was designed and piloted by the Italian Umberto Nobile. The flight started from Svalbard in Norway, and crossed the Arctic Ocean to Alaska. Nobile, with several scientists and crew from the Norge, overflew the Pole a second time on 24 May 1928, in the airship Italia. The Italia crashed on its return from the Pole, with the loss of half the crew.

Another transpolar flight was accomplished in a Tupolev ANT-25 airplane with a crew of Valery Chkalov, Georgy Baydukov and Alexander Belyakov, who flew over the North Pole on 19 June 1937, during their direct flight from the Soviet Union to the USA without any stopover.

=== Ice station ===
In May 1937 the world's first North Pole ice station, North Pole-1, was established by Soviet scientists 20 kilometres (13 mi) from the North Pole after the ever first landing of four heavy and one light aircraft onto the ice at the North Pole. The expedition members — oceanographer Pyotr Shirshov, meteorologist Yevgeny Fyodorov, radio operator Ernst Krenkel, and the leader Ivan Papanin — conducted scientific research at the station for the next nine months. By 19 February 1938, when the group was picked up by the ice breakers Taimyr and Murman, their station had drifted 2850 km to the eastern coast of Greenland.

=== 1940–2000 ===
In May 1945 an RAF Lancaster of the Aries expedition became the first Commonwealth aircraft to overfly the North Geographic and North Magnetic Poles. The plane was piloted by David Cecil McKinley of the Royal Air Force. It carried an 11-man crew, with Kenneth C. Maclure of the Royal Canadian Air Force in charge of all scientific observations. In 2006, Maclure was honoured with a spot in Canada's Aviation Hall of Fame.

Discounting Peary's disputed claim, the first men to set foot at the North Pole were a Soviet party including geophysicists Mikhail Ostrekin and Pavel Senko, oceanographers Mikhail Somov and Pavel Gordienko, and other scientists and flight crew (24 people in total) of Aleksandr Kuznetsov's Sever-2 expedition (March–May 1948). It was organized by the Chief Directorate of the Northern Sea Route. The party flew on three planes (pilots Ivan Cherevichnyy, Vitaly Maslennikov and Ilya Kotov) from Kotelny Island to the North Pole and landed there at 4:44pm (Moscow Time, UTC+04:00) on 23 April 1948. They established a temporary camp and for the next two days conducted scientific observations. On 26 April the expedition flew back to the continent.

Next year, on 9 May 1949 two other Soviet scientists (Vitali Volovich and Andrei Medvedev) became the first people to parachute onto the North Pole. They jumped from a Douglas C-47 Skytrain, registered CCCP H-369.

On 3 May 1952, U.S. Air Force Lieutenant Colonel Joseph O. Fletcher and Lieutenant William Pershing Benedict, along with scientist Albert P. Crary, landed a modified Douglas C-47 Skytrain at the North Pole. Some Western sources considered this to be the first landing at the Pole until the Soviet landings became widely known.

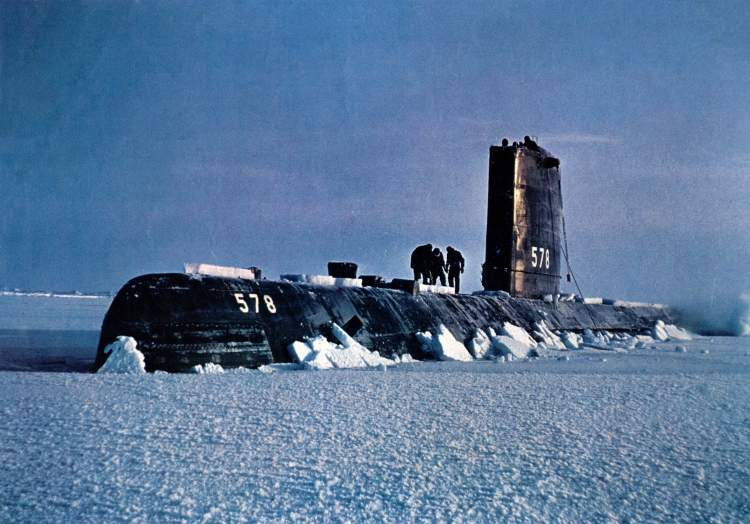
USS Skate at drift station Alpha, 1958

The United States Navy submarine USS Nautilus (SSN-571) crossed the North Pole on 3 August 1958. On 17 March 1959 USS Skate (SSN-578) surfaced at the Pole, breaking through the ice above it, becoming the first naval vessel to do so.

The first confirmed surface conquest of the North Pole was accomplished by Ralph Plaisted, Walt Pederson, Gerry Pitzl and Jean Luc Bombardier, who traveled over the ice by snowmobile and arrived on 19 April 1968. The United States Air Force independently confirmed their position.

On 6 April 1969 Wally Herbert and companions Allan Gill, Roy Koerner and Kenneth Hedges of the British Trans-Arctic Expedition became the first men to reach the North Pole on foot (albeit with the aid of dog teams and airdrops). They continued on to complete the first surface crossing of the Arctic Ocean – and by its longest axis, Barrow, Alaska, to Svalbard – a feat that has never been repeated. Because of suggestions (later proven false) of Plaisted's use of air transport, some sources classify Herbert's expedition as the first confirmed to reach the North Pole over the ice surface by any means. In the 1980s Plaisted's pilots Weldy Phipps and Ken Lee signed affidavits asserting that no such airlift was provided. It is also said that Herbert was the first person to reach the pole of inaccessibility.

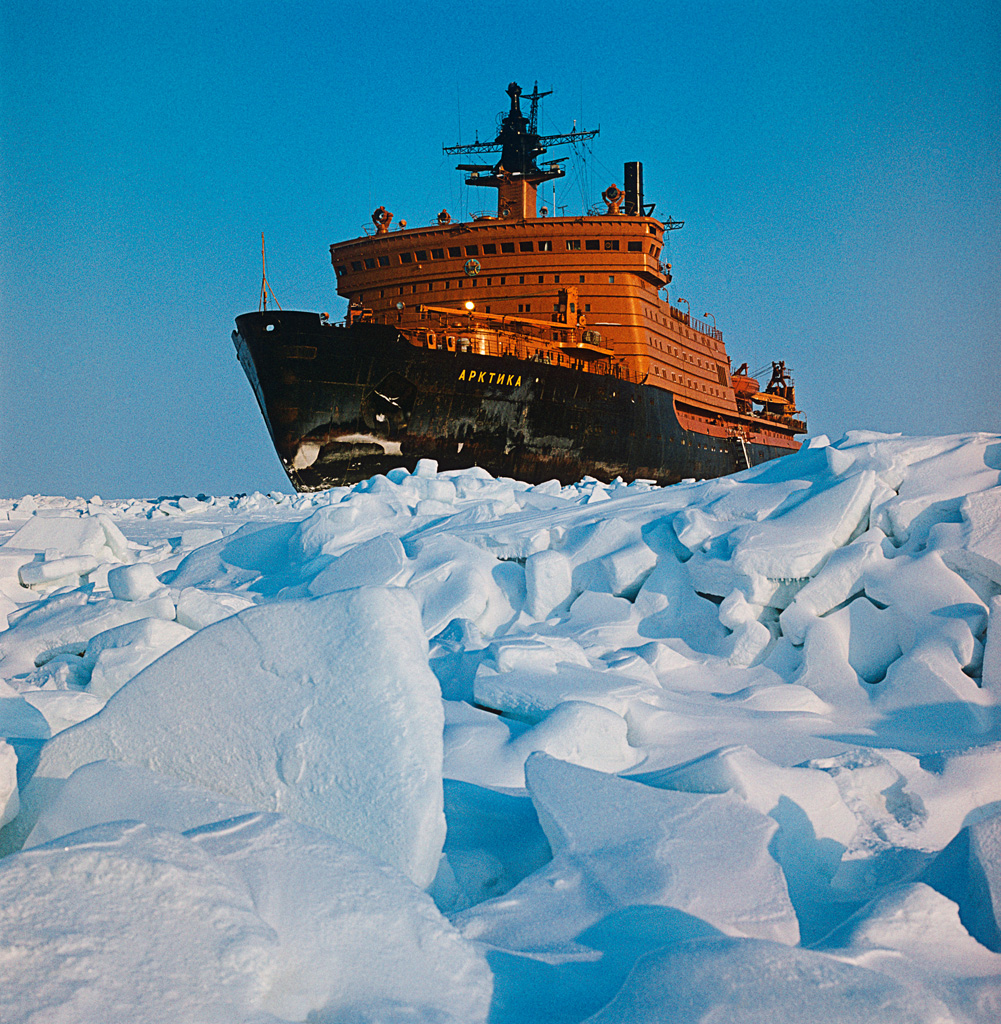
Soviet icebreaker Arktika, the first surface ship to reach the North Pole, 1977

On 17 August 1977 the Soviet nuclear-powered icebreaker Arktika completed the first surface vessel journey to the North Pole.

In 1982 Ranulph Fiennes and Charles R. Burton became the first people to cross the Arctic Ocean in a single season. They departed from Cape Crozier, Ellesmere Island, on 17 February 1982 and arrived at the geographic North Pole on 10 April 1982. They travelled on foot and snowmobile. From the Pole, they travelled towards Svalbard but, due to the unstable nature of the ice, ended their crossing at the ice edge after drifting south on an ice floe for 99 days. They were eventually able to walk to their expedition ship MV Benjamin Bowring and boarded it on 4 August 1982 at position 80:31N 00:59W. Specifically, after departing from Greenwich in the United Kingdom in September 1979, they had reached the South Pole on 15 December 1980 and then traveled for 14 months to reach the North Pole on 11 April 1982, then completed their circumnavigation when they arrived at their starting point in Greenwich on 29 August 1982. As a result of this journey, which formed a section of the three-year Transglobe Expedition 1979–1982, Fiennes and Burton became the first people to complete a circumnavigation of the world via both North and South Poles, by surface travel alone. This achievement remains unchallenged to this day. The expedition crew included a Jack Russell Terrier named Bothie who became the first dog to visit both poles.

In 1985 Sir Edmund Hillary (the first man to stand on the summit of Mount Everest) and Neil Armstrong (the first man to stand on the moon) landed at the North Pole in a small twin-engined ski plane. Hillary thus became the first man to stand at both poles and on the summit of Everest.

In 1986 Will Steger, with seven teammates, became the first to be confirmed as reaching the Pole by dogsled and without resupply.

USS Gurnard (SSN-662) operated in the Arctic Ocean under the polar ice cap from September to November 1984 in company with one of her sister ships, the attack submarine USS Pintado (SSN-672). On 12 November 1984 Gurnard and Pintado became the third pair of submarines to surface together at the North Pole. In March 1990, Gurnard deployed to the Arctic region during exercise Ice Ex '90 and completed only the fourth winter submerged transit of the Bering and Seas. Gurnard surfaced at the North Pole on 18 April, in the company of the USS Seahorse (SSN-669).

On 6 May 1986 USS Archerfish (SSN 678), USS Ray (SSN 653) and USS Hawkbill (SSN-666) surfaced at the North Pole, the first tri-submarine surfacing at the North Pole.

On 21 April 1987 Shinji Kazama of Japan became the first person to reach the North Pole on a motorcycle.

On 18 May 1987 USS Billfish (SSN 676), USS Sea Devil (SSN 664) and HMS Superb (S 109) surfaced at the North Pole, the first international surfacing at the North Pole.

In 1988 a team of 13 (9 Soviets, 4 Canadians) skied across the arctic from Siberia to northern Canada. One of the Canadians, Richard Weber, became the first person to reach the Pole from both sides of the Arctic Ocean.

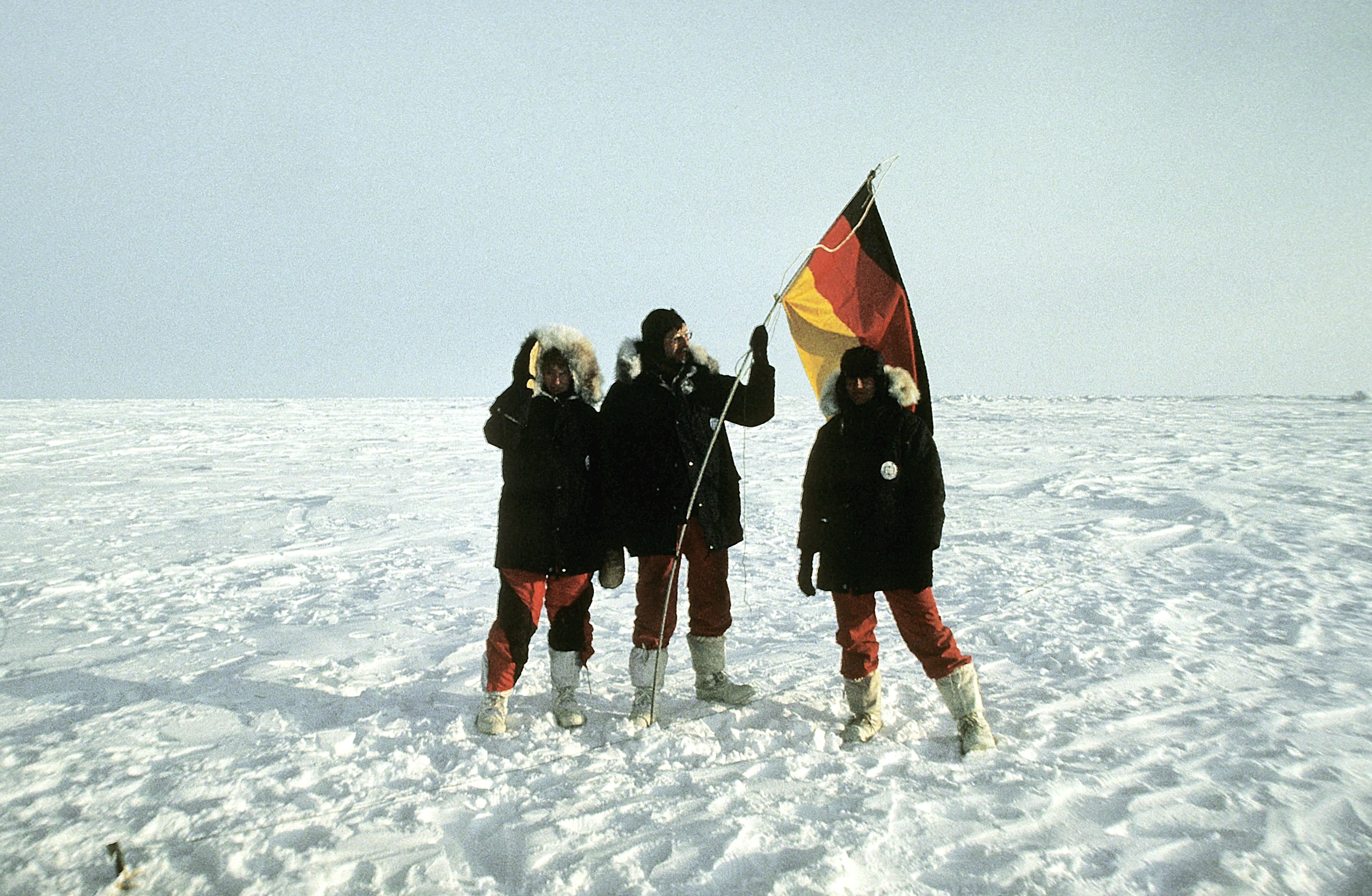
Participants of the first German North Pole expedition 1990 from University of Giessen

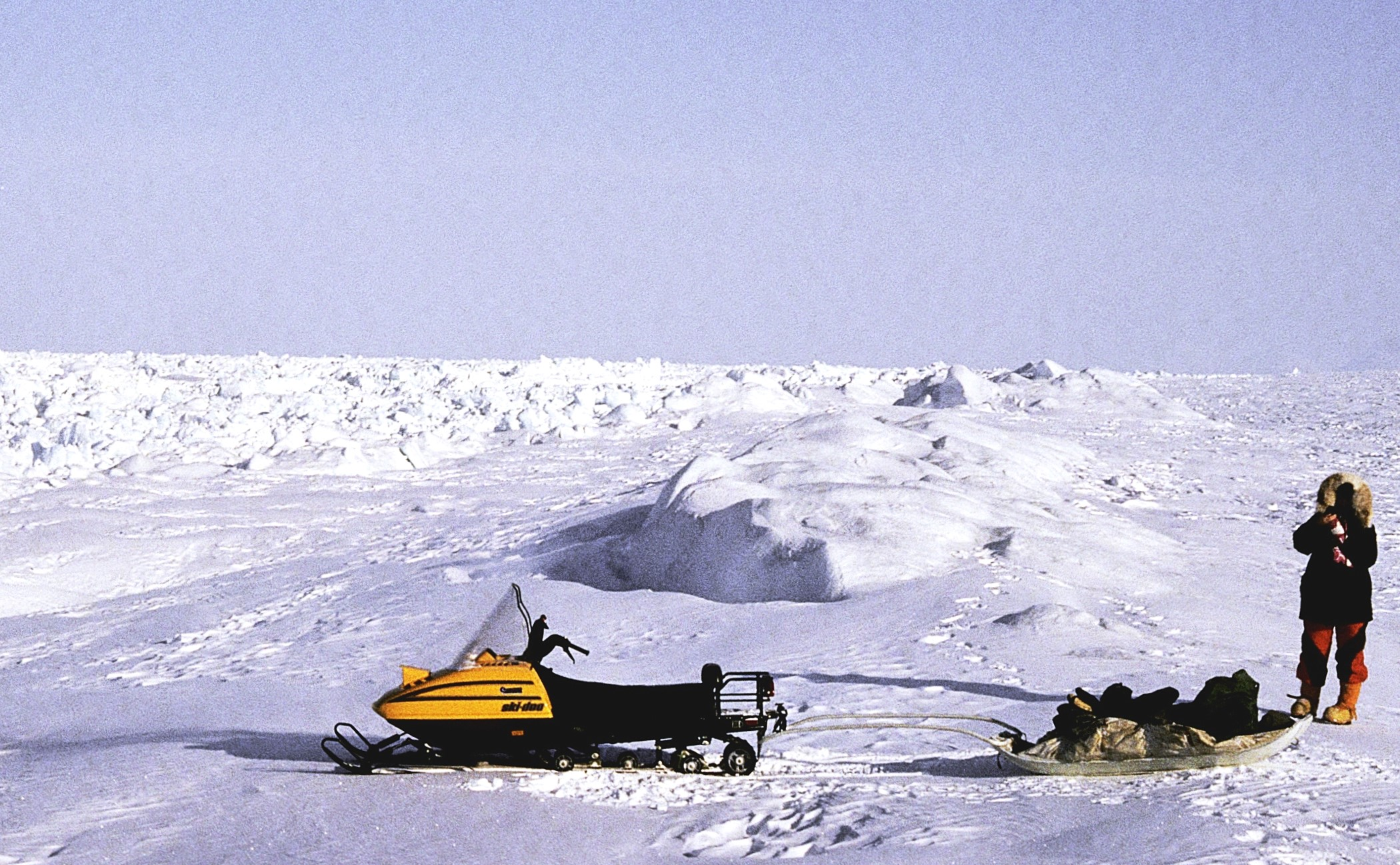
The German North Pole expedition 1990, Ski-Doo for local research on pack-ice

On 16 April 1990, a German-Swiss expedition led by a team of the University of Giessen reached the Geographic North Pole for studies on pollution of pack ice, snow and air. Samples taken were analyzed in cooperation with the Geological Survey of Canada and the Alfred Wegener Institute for Polar and Marine Research. Further stops for sample collections were on multi-year sea ice at 86°N, at Cape Columbia and Ward Hunt Island.

On 4 May 1990 Børge Ousland and Erling Kagge became the first explorers ever to reach the North Pole unsupported, after a 58-day ski trek from Ellesmere Island in Canada, a distance of 800 km.

On 7 September 1991 the German research vessel Polarstern and the Swedish icebreaker Oden reached the North Pole as the first conventional powered vessels. Both scientific parties and crew took oceanographic and geological samples and had a common tug of war and a football game on an ice floe. Polarstern again reached the pole exactly 10 years later, with the Healy.

In 1998, 1999, and 2000, Lada Niva Marshs (special very large wheeled versions made by BRONTO, Lada/Vaz's experimental product division) were driven to the North Pole. The 1998 expedition was dropped by parachute and completed the track to the North Pole. The 2000 expedition departed from a Russian research base around 114 km from the Pole and claimed an average speed of 20–15 km/h in an average temperature of −30 °C.

=== 21st century ===
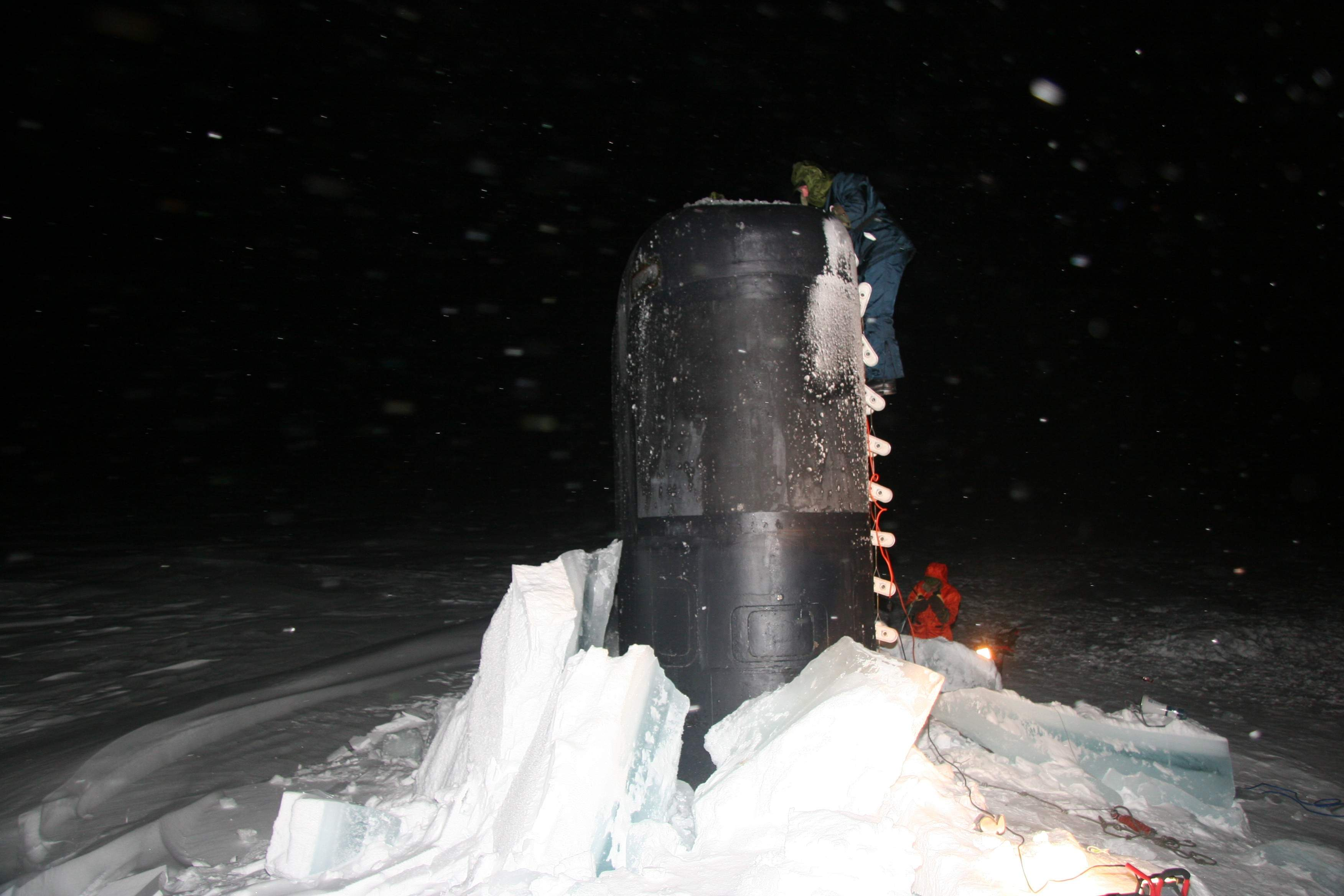
USS Charlotte at the North Pole in 2005

Commercial airliner flights on the polar routes may pass within viewing distance of the North Pole. For example, a flight from Chicago to Beijing may come close as latitude 89° N, though because of prevailing winds return journeys go over the Bering Strait. In recent years journeys to the North Pole by air (landing by helicopter or on a runway prepared on the ice) or by icebreaker have become relatively routine, and are even available to small groups of tourists through adventure holiday companies. Parachute jumps have frequently been made onto the North Pole in recent years. The temporary seasonal Russian camp of Barneo has been established by air a short distance from the Pole annually since 2002, and caters for scientific researchers as well as tourist parties. Trips from the camp to the Pole itself may be arranged overland or by helicopter.

The first attempt at underwater exploration of the North Pole was made on 22 April 1998 by Russian firefighter and diver Andrei Rozhkov with the support of the Diving Club of Moscow State University, but ended in fatality. The next attempted dive at the North Pole was organized the next year by the same diving club, and ended in success on 24 April 1999. The divers were Michael Wolff (Austria), Brett Cormick (UK), and Bob Wass (USA).

In 2005 the United States Navy submarine USS Charlotte (SSN-766) surfaced through 155 cm (61 in) of ice at the North Pole and spent 18 hours there.

In July 2007 British endurance swimmer Lewis Gordon Pugh completed a 1 km (0.62 mi) swim at the North Pole. His feat, undertaken to highlight the effects of global warming, took place in clear water that had opened up between the ice floes. His later attempt to paddle a kayak to the North Pole in late 2008, following the erroneous prediction of clear water to the Pole, was stymied when his expedition found itself stuck in thick ice after only three days. The expedition was then abandoned.

By September 2007 the North Pole had been visited 66 times by different surface ships: 54 times by Soviet and Russian icebreakers, 4 times by Swedish Oden, 3 times by German Polarstern, 3 times by USCGC Healy and USCGC Polar Sea, and once by CCGS Louis S. St-Laurent and by Swedish Vidar Viking.

==== 2007 descent to the North Pole seabed ====
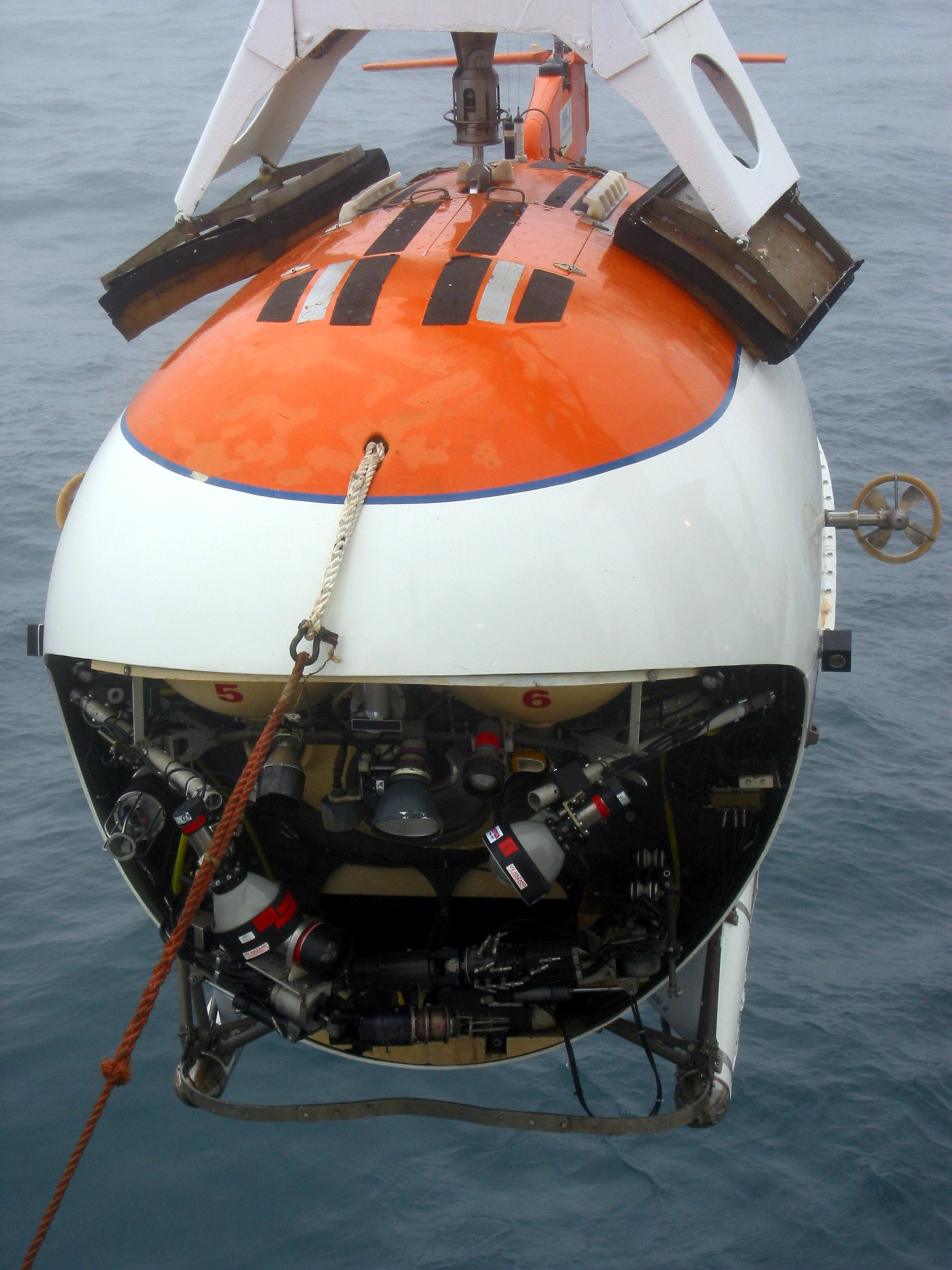
Russian MIR submersible, one of the two vehicles that were used in the first ever manned descent to the seabed under the North Pole

On 2 August 2007 a Russian scientific expedition Arktika 2007 made the first ever manned descent to the ocean floor at the North Pole, to a depth of 4.3 km (2.7 mi), as part of the research programme in support of Russia's 2001 extended continental shelf claim to a large swathe of the Arctic Ocean floor. The descent took place in two MIR submersibles and was led by Soviet and Russian polar explorer Artur Chilingarov. In a symbolic act of visitation, the Russian flag was placed on the ocean floor exactly at the Pole.

The expedition was the latest in a series of efforts intended to give Russia a dominant influence in the Arctic according to The New York Times.

==== MLAE 2009 Expedition ====
In 2009 the Russian Marine Live-Ice Automobile Expedition (MLAE-2009) with Vasily Elagin as a leader and a team of Afanasy Makovnev, Vladimir Obikhod, Alexey Shkrabkin, Sergey Larin, Alexey Ushakov and Nikolay Nikulshin reached the North Pole on two custom-built 6 x 6 low-pressure-tire ATVs. The vehicles, Yemelya-1 and Yemelya-2, were designed by Vasily Elagin, a Russian mountain climber, explorer and engineer. They reached the North Pole on 26 April 2009, 17:30 (Moscow time). The expedition was partly supported by Russian State Aviation. The Russian Book of Records recognized it as the first successful vehicle trip from land to the Geographical North Pole.

==== MLAE 2013 Expedition ====
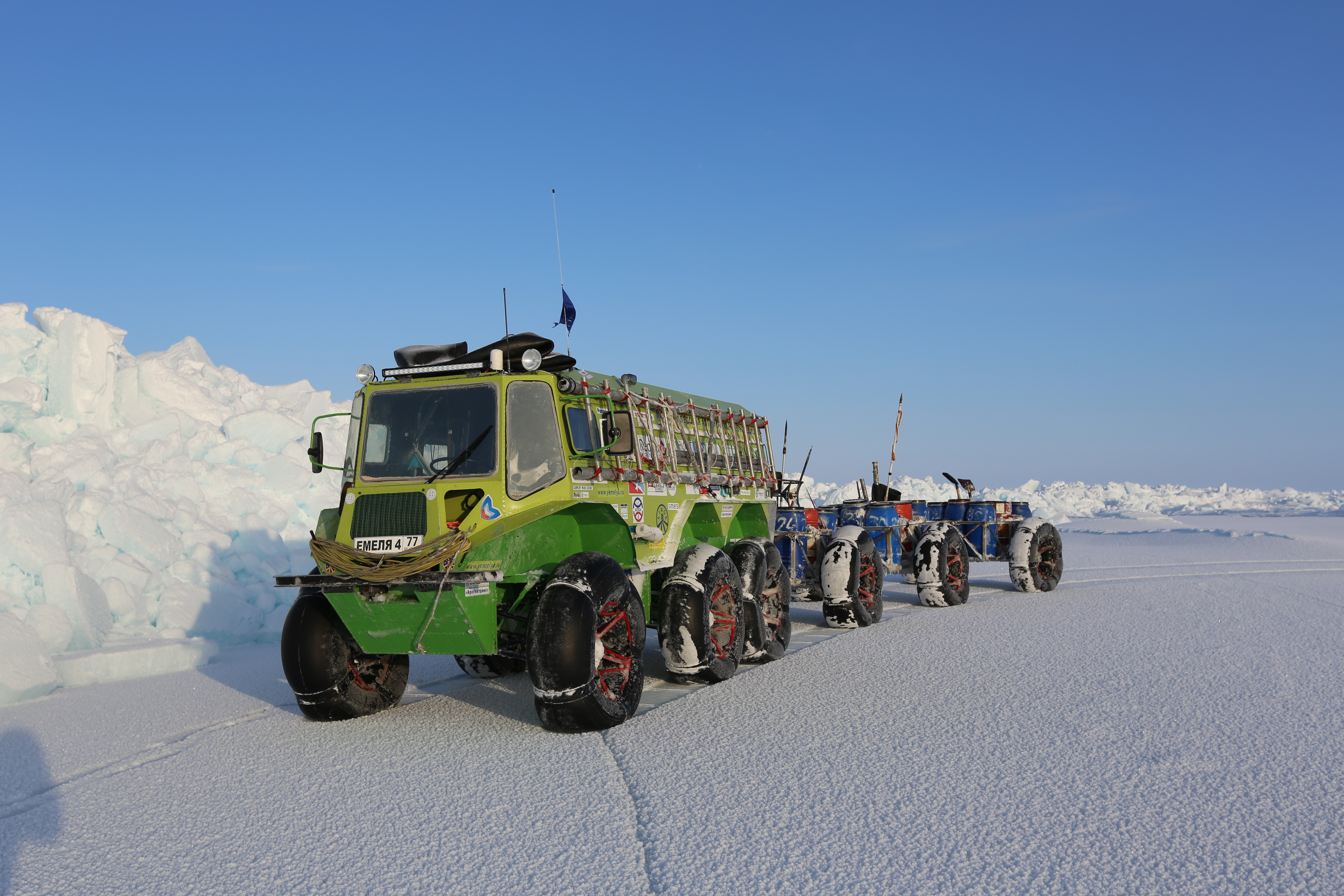
Yemelya, an all terrain Russian amphibious vehicle

On 1 March 2013 the Russian Marine Live-Ice Automobile Expedition (MLAE 2013) with Vasily Elagin as a leader, and a team of Afanasy Makovnev, Vladimir Obikhod, Alexey Shkrabkin, Andrey Vankov, Sergey Isayev and Nikolay Kozlov on two custom-built 6 x 6 low-pressure-tire ATVs—Yemelya-3 and Yemelya-4—started from Golomyanny Island (the Severnaya Zemlya Archipelago) to the North Pole across drifting ice of the Arctic Ocean. The vehicles reached the Pole on 6 April and then continued to the Canadian coast. The coast was reached on 30 April 2013 (83°08N, 075°59W Ward Hunt Island), and on 5 May 2013 the expedition finished in Resolute Bay, NU. The way between the Russian borderland (Machtovyi Island of the Severnaya Zemlya Archipelago, 80°15N, 097°27E) and the Canadian coast (Ward Hunt Island, 83°08N, 075°59W) took 55 days; it was ~2300 km across drifting ice and about 4000 km in total. The expedition was totally self-dependent and used no external supplies. The expedition was supported by the Russian Geographical Society.

== Time and day and night ==
The sun at the North Pole is continuously above the horizon during the summer and continuously below the horizon during the winter. Sunrise is just before the March equinox (around 20 March); the Sun then takes three months to reach its highest point of near 23½° elevation at the summer solstice (around 21 June), after which time it begins to sink, reaching sunset just after the September equinox (around 23 September). When the Sun is visible in the polar sky, it appears to move in a horizontal circle above the horizon. This circle gradually rises from near the horizon just after the vernal equinox to its maximum elevation (in degrees) above the horizon at summer solstice and then sinks back toward the horizon before sinking below it at the autumnal equinox. Hence the North and South Poles experience the slowest rates of sunrise and sunset on Earth.

The twilight period that occurs before sunrise and after sunset has three different definitions:

- a civil twilight period of about two weeks;
- a nautical twilight period of about five weeks; and
- an astronomical twilight period of about seven weeks.

These effects are caused by a combination of the Earth's axial tilt and its revolution around the Sun. The direction of the Earth's axial tilt, as well as its angle relative to the plane of the Earth's orbit around the Sun, remains very nearly constant over the course of a year (both change very slowly over long time periods). At northern midsummer the North Pole is facing towards the Sun to its maximum extent. As the year progresses and the Earth moves around the Sun, the North Pole gradually turns away from the Sun until at midwinter it is facing away from the Sun to its maximum extent. A similar sequence is observed at the South Pole, with a six-month time difference.

Since longitude is undefined at the north pole, the exact time is a matter of convention. Polar expeditions use whatever time is most convenient, such as Greenwich Mean Time or the time zone of their origin.

== Climate, sea ice at North Pole ==
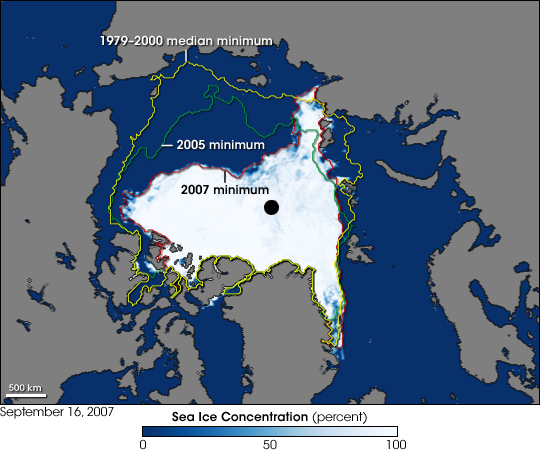
Arctic ice shrinkages of 2007 compared to 2005 and also compared to the 1979–2000 average.

The North Pole is substantially warmer than the South Pole because it lies at sea level in the middle of an ocean (which acts as a reservoir of heat), rather than at altitude on a continental land mass. Despite being an ice cap, the northernmost weather station in Greenland has a tundra climate (Köppen ET) due to the July and August mean temperatures peaking just above freezing. (Note: Data is from a Greenlandic weather station at 83°38′N 033°22′W located 709 km (441 mi) from the North Pole)

Winter temperatures at the northernmost weather station in Greenland can range from about −50 to −13 °C (−58 to 9 °F), averaging around −31 °C (−24 °F), with the North Pole being slightly colder. However, a freak storm caused the temperature to reach 0.7 °C (33.3 °F) for a time at a World Meteorological Organization buoy, located at 87.45°N, on 30 December 2015. It was estimated that the temperature at the North Pole was between −1 and 2 °C (30 and 35 °F) during the storm. Summer temperatures (June, July, and August) average around the freezing point (0 °C (32 °F)). The highest temperature yet recorded is 13 °C (55 °F), much warmer than the South Pole's record high of only −12.3 °C (9.9 °F). A similar spike in temperatures occurred on 15 November 2016 when temperatures hit freezing. Yet again, February 2018 featured a storm so powerful that temperatures at Cape Morris Jesup, the world's northernmost weather station in Greenland, reached 6.1 °C (43.0 °F) and spent 24 straight hours above freezing. Meanwhile, the pole itself was estimated to reach a high temperature of 1.6 °C (34.9 °F). This same temperature of 1.6 °C (34.9 °F) was also recorded at the Hollywood Burbank Airport in Los Angeles at the very same time.

The sea ice at the North Pole is typically around 2 to 3 m (6 ft 7 in to 9 ft 10 in) thick, although ice thickness, its spatial extent, and the fraction of open water within the ice pack can vary rapidly and profoundly in response to weather and climate. Studies have shown that the average ice thickness has decreased in recent years. It is likely that global warming has contributed to this, but it is not possible to attribute the recent abrupt decrease in thickness entirely to the observed warming in the Arctic. Reports have also predicted that within a few decades the Arctic Ocean will be entirely free of ice in the summer. This may have significant commercial implications; see "Territorial claims", below.

The retreat of the Arctic sea ice will accelerate global warming, as less ice cover reflects less solar radiation, and may have serious climate implications by contributing to Arctic cyclone generation.

Climate data for Greenlandic Weather Station at 83°38′N 033°22′W located 709 km (441 mi) from the North Pole (eleven year average observations).
Month	Jan	Feb	Mar	Apr	May	Jun	Jul	Aug	Sep	Oct	Nov	Dec	Year
Record high °C (°F)	−13 (9)	−14 (7)	−11 (12)	−6 (21)	3 (37)	10 (50)	13 (55)	12 (54)	7 (45)	9 (48)	0.6 (33.1)	0.7 (33.3)	13 (55)
Mean daily maximum °C (°F)	−29 (−20)	−31 (−24)	−30 (−22)	−22 (−8)	−9 (16)	0 (32)	2 (36)	1 (34)	0 (32)	−8 (18)	−25 (−13)	−26 (−15)	−15 (6)
Daily mean °C (°F)	−31 (−24)	−32 (−26)	−31 (−24)	−23 (−9)	−11 (12)	−1 (30)	1 (34)	0 (32)	−1 (30)	−10 (14)	−27 (−17)	−28 (−18)	−16 (3)
Mean daily minimum °C (°F)	−33 (−27)	−35 (−31)	−34 (−29)	−26 (−15)	−12 (10)	−2 (28)	0 (32)	−1 (30)	−2 (28)	−11 (12)	−30 (−22)	−31 (−24)	−18 (−1)
Record low °C (°F)	−47 (−53)	−50 (−58)	−50 (−58)	−41 (−42)	−24 (−11)	−12 (10)	−2 (28)	−12 (10)	−31 (−24)	−21 (−6)	−41 (−42)	−47 (−53)	−50 (−58)
Average relative humidity (%)	83.5	83.0	83.0	85.0	87.5	90.0	90.0	89.5	88.0	84.5	83.0	83.0	85.8
Source: Weatherbase

== Flora and fauna ==
Polar bears are believed to travel rarely beyond about 82° North, owing to the scarcity of food, though tracks have been seen in the vicinity of the North Pole, and a 2006 expedition reported sighting a polar bear just 1 mi (1.6 km) from the Pole. The ringed seal has also been seen at the Pole, and Arctic foxes have been observed less than 60 km (37 mi) away at 89°40′ N.

Birds seen at or very near the Pole include the snow bunting, northern fulmar and black-legged kittiwake, though some bird sightings may be distorted by the tendency of birds to follow ships and expeditions.

Fish have been seen in the waters at the North Pole, but these are probably few in number. A member of the Russian team that descended to the North Pole seabed in August 2007 reported seeing no sea creatures living there. However, it was later reported that a sea anemone had been scooped up from the seabed mud by the Russian team and that video footage from the dive showed unidentified shrimps and amphipods.

== Territorial claims to the North Pole and Arctic regions ==
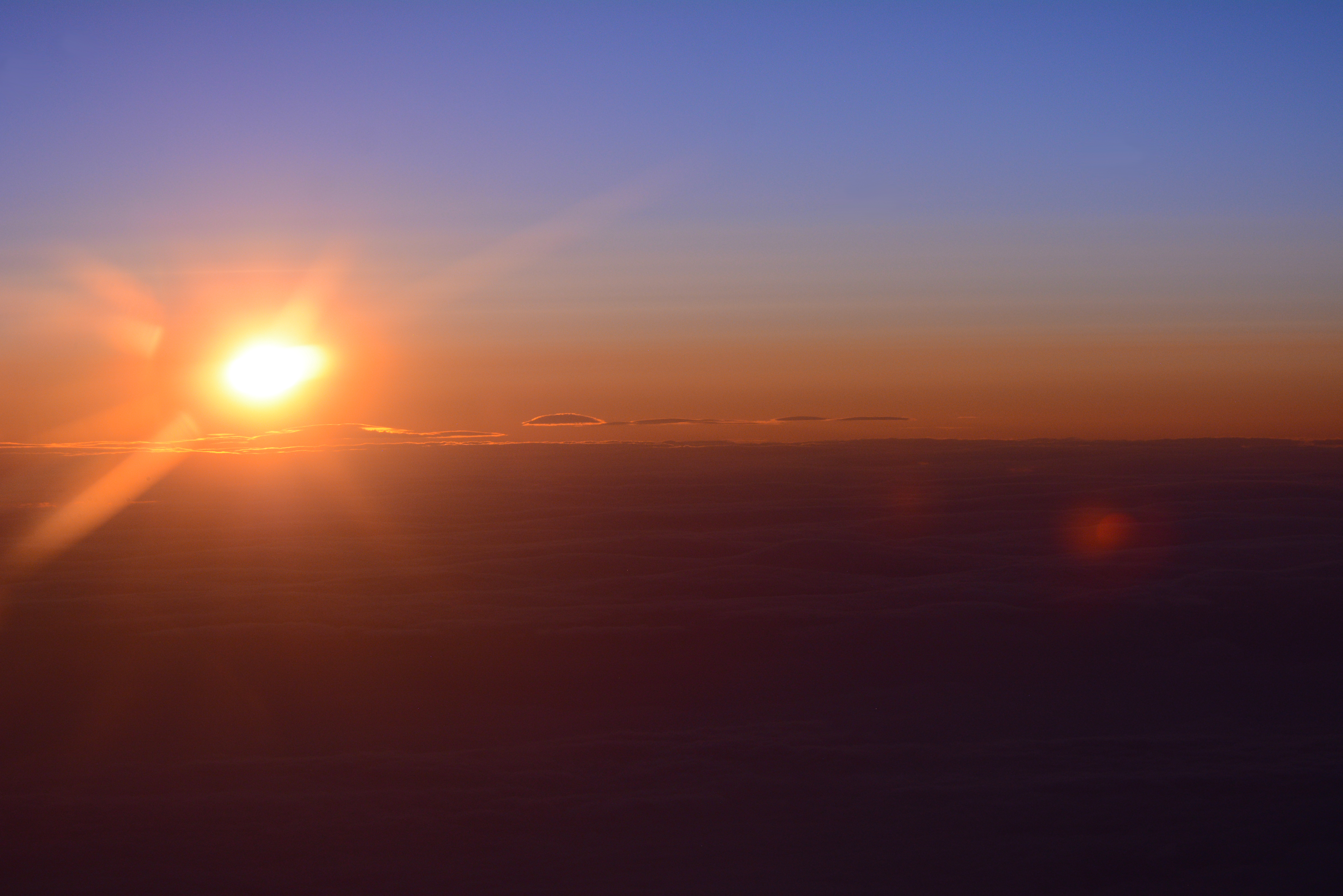
The sun over the horizon as seen from the North Pole looking towards the 180th meridian (the International Date Line), 2015

Currently, under international law, no country owns the North Pole or the region of the Arctic Ocean surrounding it. The five surrounding Arctic countries, Russia, Canada, Norway, Denmark (via Greenland), and the United States, are limited to a 200-nautical-mile (370 km; 230 mi) exclusive economic zone off their coasts, and the area beyond that is administered by the International Seabed Authority.

Upon ratification of the United Nations Convention on the Law of the Sea, a country has 10 years to make claims to an extended continental shelf beyond its 200-mile exclusive economic zone. If validated, such a claim gives the claimant state rights to what may be on or beneath the sea bottom within the claimed zone. Norway (ratified the convention in 1996), Russia (ratified in 1997), Canada (ratified in 2003) and Denmark (ratified in 2004) have all launched projects to base claims that certain areas of Arctic continental shelves should be subject to their sole sovereign exploitation.

In 1907 Canada invoked the "sector principle" to claim sovereignty over a sector stretching from its coasts to the North Pole. This claim has not been relinquished, but was not consistently pressed until 2013.

== Cultural associations ==
In some children's Christmas legends and Western folklore, the geographic North Pole is described as the location of Santa Claus' workshop and residence. Canada Post has assigned postal code H0H 0H0 to the North Pole (referring to Santa's traditional exclamation of "Ho ho ho!").

This association reflects an age-old esoteric mythology of Hyperborea that posits the North Pole, the otherworldly world-axis, as the abode of God and superhuman beings.

As Henry Corbin has documented, the North Pole plays a key part in the cultural worldview of Sufism and Iranian mysticism. "The Orient sought by the mystic, the Orient that cannot be located on our maps, is in the direction of the north, beyond the north."

In Mandaean cosmology, the North Pole and Polaris are considered to be auspicious, since they are associated with the World of Light. Mandaeans face north when praying, and temples are also oriented towards the north. On the contrary, South is associated with the World of Darkness.

Owing to its remoteness, the Pole is sometimes identified with a mysterious mountain of ancient Iranian tradition called Mount Qaf (Jabal Qaf), the "farthest point of the earth". According to certain authors, the Jabal Qaf of Muslim cosmology is a version of Rupes Nigra, a mountain whose ascent, like Dante's climbing of the Mountain of Purgatory, represents the pilgrim's progress through spiritual states. In Iranian theosophy, the heavenly Pole, the focal point of the spiritual ascent, acts as a magnet to draw beings to its "palaces ablaze with immaterial matter."

== See also ==
- Arctic cooperation and politics
- Arctic Council
- Arctic ice pack
- Antarctica
- Biome
- Celestial pole
- Ecliptic pole
- Inuit Circumpolar Council
- North Pole, Alaska
- North Pole, New York
- Polaris
- Poles of astronomical bodies
- South Pole
- Willem Barentsz
