= Albert P. Crary =

American geophysicist

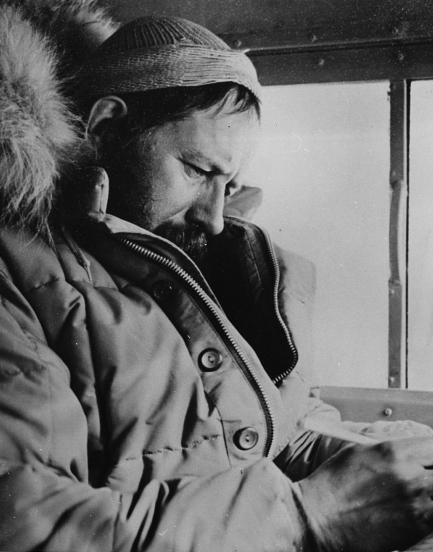
- Albert Paddock Crary in 1959

Chief Scientist for the United States Antarctic Research Program
- In office 1960–1968

Personal details
- Born: Albert Paddock Crary; July 25, 1911 Pierrepont, New York, United States
- Died: October 29, 1987 (aged 76) Washington, D.C., United States
- Resting place: Pierrepont Hill Cemetery, Pierrepont, New York
- Spouse: Mildred R. Rodgers
- Children: 1
- Relatives: Oringe Smith Crary (great-great-great-uncle); Scott Crary (cousin)
- Education: St. Lawrence University; Lehigh University
- Known for: Polar exploration
- Awards: Cullum Geographical Medal (1959); Patron's Medal (1963); Vega Medal (1972)
- Scientific career
- Fields: Geophysics, Glaciology

Albert Paddock Crary (July 25, 1911 – October 29, 1987), was an American pioneer polar geophysicist and glaciologist. He was the first person to have set foot on both the North and South Poles, having made it to the North Pole on May 3, 1952 (with Joseph O. Fletcher and William P. Benedict) and then to the South Pole on February 12, 1961, as the leader of a team of eight. The South Pole expedition set out from McMurdo Station on December 10, 1960, using three Snowcats with trailers. Crary was the seventh expedition leader to arrive at the South Pole by surface transportation (the six others before him were—in sequence—Amundsen, Scott, Hillary, Fuchs, a Russian expedition in 1959–60 from Vostok base, and Antero Havola). He was widely admired for his intellect, wit, skills and as a great administrator for polar research expeditions.

== Biography ==
Crary was born in 1911 into a farming family in northern New York State. He was the second oldest in a family of 7 children. He was a physics major and geology student at St. Lawrence University in Canton, New York. He graduated in 1931 Phi Beta Kappa from St. Lawrence University and then enrolled at Lehigh University to obtain a master's degree in physics. After spending years completing and facilitating research at both poles, Crary eventually settled in Bethesda, Maryland, with his wife and son.

His awards included the Cullum Geographical Medal (1959), the Patron's Medal (1963), and the Vega Medal (1972).

He died on October 29, 1987, at the George Washington University Hospital in Washington, D.C.

== Legacy ==
In 1991, the National Science Foundation (NSF), which manages the U.S. Antarctic Program (USAP), honoured his memory by dedicating a state-of-the-art laboratory complex in his name, the Albert P. Crary Science and Engineering Center (CSEC) located in McMurdo Station. He was also honored by having the Crary Mountains (76 degrees 48' S, 117 degrees 40' W) and the Crary Ice Rise in Antarctica named for him as well.

== Contributions ==
Crary contributed in a variety of important ways to his field including:

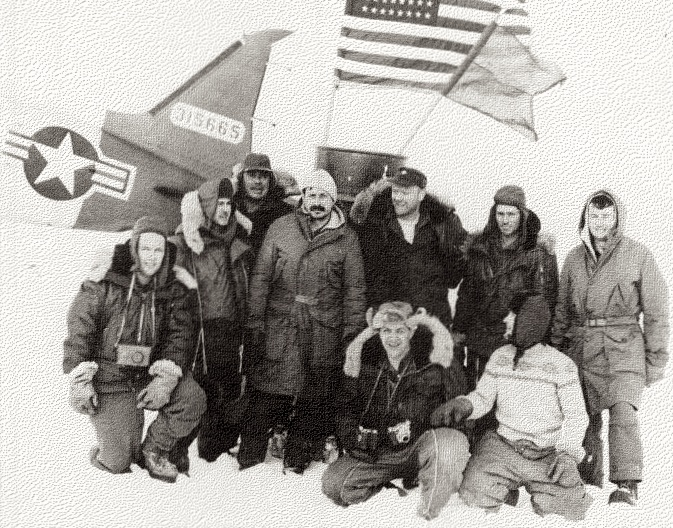
Crary and his team at the North Pole in 1952

- Chief Scientist for Arctic T3, Fletcher's Ice Island, 1952–1955
- Established the United States Geological Headquarters for the International Geophysical Year, 1955
- Deputy Leader of United States science during the International Geophysical Year, 1957
- Leader of the U.S. seismic traverse of Ross Ice Shelf, 1957–1958
- Leader, geophysical traverse W from Little America V, up Skelton Glacier to the Victoria Land plateau and W along the 78 parallel to c. 13130E, 1958–1959
- Leader, geophysical traverse from McMurdo Station via Skelton Glacier to the South Pole, 1960–1961
- Chief Scientist, United States Antarctic Research Program, 1960–1968
- Deputy then Director, Division of Environmental Sciences, National Science Foundation, 1969–1978
- Member of ACAN, 1961–76 (Chairman, 1974–1976)

He worked with many notable scientists and famous institutions:

- Dr. Maurice Ewing of Columbia University and Woods Hole Oceanographic Institution
- Assisted Dr. James Peoples at MOGUL (Project Mogul) as the Field Operations Director using meteorological balloons to experiment with different types of equipment to collect and transmit sound waves in the upper atmosphere (Roswell incident- see Project Mogul)

== See also ==
- List of polar explorers
