= Joseph O. Fletcher =

U.S. Air Force pilot and polar explorer (1920–2008)

Joseph Otis Fletcher
- Born: May 16, 1920; Ryegate, Montana, US
- Died: July 6, 2008 (aged 88); Sequim, Washington, US
- Education: University of Oklahoma; Massachusetts Institute of Technology; University of Alaska (Ph.D. 1979)
- Known for: Polar explorer
- Spouse: Caroline Sisco Howard (m. 1949)

Joseph Otis Fletcher (May 16, 1920 – July 6, 2008) was an American Air Force pilot and polar explorer.

== Biography ==
He was born outside of Ryegate, Montana on May 16, 1920, to Clarence Bert Fletcher. The family moved to Oklahoma during the Dust Bowl.

Fletcher started studying at the University of Oklahoma and then continued his studies in meteorology at Massachusetts Institute of Technology. After graduation, he entered the U.S. Army Air Corps and eventually became the deputy commanding officer of the 4th Weather Group, United States Air Force, stationed in Alaska.

He married Caroline Sisco Howard on October 15, 1949.

On March 19, 1952, his team landed with a C-47 aircraft, modified to have both wheels and skis, on a tabular iceberg in the Arctic Ocean and established a weather station there, which remained staffed for 22 years before the iceberg broke up. The station was initially known just as "T-3" but soon was renamed "Fletcher's Ice Island".

On May 3, 1952, pilot William P. Benedict and Fletcher as co-pilot flew that plane to the North Pole, along with scientist Albert P. Crary, to become the first Americans to land and set foot on the exact geographic North Pole. Unknown to Fletcher and his team, a Soviet expedition had previously landed three Lisunov Li-2s at the pole on April 23, 1948.

Fletcher left the Air Force in 1963. In later years, he held various management positions in meteorological institutions, including a post as director of the NOAA's Office of Oceanic and Atmospheric Research (OAR).

He received a doctorate from University of Alaska in 1979.

He retired in 1993. In 2005, he was awarded the honorary membership of the American Meteorological Society. The Fletcher Ice Rise in Antarctica was named for him.

He died on July 6, 2008, in Sequim, Washington at age 88. He was buried in Resthaven Memorial Park in Shawnee, Oklahoma.
