= MLAE-2011 =

Arctic expedition

MLAE-2011 was a two vehicle arctic expedition with a crew of seven following a route from Dudinka (Russia) via the North Pole to Resolute Bay (Canada).

The expedition was organized by the Russian Center For Arctic Exploration and carried out under the patronage of the Special Representative of the President of Russian Federation In International Cooperation In The Arctic and the first vice-president of the Russian Geographical Society, A.N. Chilingarov

The expedition was to traverse the ice of the Arctic Ocean under the flag of Russian Geographical Society. On reaching the North Pole, the expedition was to head south to Canada and was expected to end in Resolute (Qasuittuq), in the Canadian territory of Nunavut, around June 15, 2011.

The crew travelled in two custom built amphibious vehicles, Yemelya-3 and Yemelya-4

The expedition was headed by the Russian explorer and engineer, Vasily Yelagin. Progress on the route was satellite tracked and recorded.
