= List of Arctic exploration vessels =

This is a list of Arctic exploration vessels:

- USS Advance (1850)
- Airship Italia
- Akademik Fyodorov
- Akademik Tryoshnikov
- HMS Alert (1856)
- America (airship)
- Antarctic Snow Cruiser
- HMS Assistance (1850)
- USS Bear (1874)
- HMS Blossom (1806)
- Bowdoin (Arctic schooner)
- SS Chelyuskin
- USRC Thomas Corwin (1876)
- HMS Discovery (1874)
- Effie M. Morrissey
- HMS Enterprise (1848)
- HMS Erebus (1826)
- Fox (ship)
- Fram (ship)
- HMS Fury (1814)
- Icebreaker Fyodor Litke
- HMS Griper (1813)
- USCGC Healy (WAGB-20)
- HMS Hecla (1815)
- HMS Investigator (1848)
- USS Jeannette (1878)
- Icebreaker Joseph Stalin
- Karluk (ship)
- King & Winge (fishing schooner)
- MIR (submersible)
- USS Nautilus (SSN-571)
- Norge (airship)
- Steamer Pravda
- HMS Resolute (1850)
- USS Rodgers (1879)
- USS Sargo (SSN-583)
- USS Seadragon (SSN-584)
- Icebreaker Sedov
- Sibiryakov (1909 icebreaker)
- USS Skate (SSN-578)
- HMS Terror (1813)
- Steamer Tovarishch Stalin
- USS Rescue (1850)
- Steamer Volodarskiy
- USS Whale (SSN-638)
- LZ 127 Graf Zeppelin
- Germania (ship)
- RV Polarstern
