= Ralph Plaisted =

American explorer (1927 - 2008)

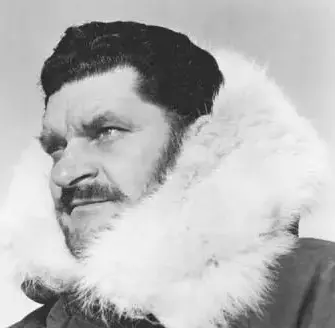
- Plaisted c. 1968
- Born: September 27, 1927; Bruno, Minnesota, U.S.
- Died: September 8, 2008 (aged 80); Wyoming, Minnesota, U.S.
- Occupation: Insurance salesman
- Known for: Expedition to the North Pole via snowmobile in 1968
- Spouse: Riki Magnolo (m. 1967; death 1998)
- Children: 3

Ralph Summers Plaisted (September 30, 1927 – September 8, 2008) was an American explorer who, with his three companions, Walt Pederson, Gerry Pitzl and Jean-Luc Bombardier, are regarded by most polar authorities to be the first to succeed in a surface traverse across the ice to the North Pole on April 19, 1968, making the first confirmed surface conquest of the Pole.

== Background ==
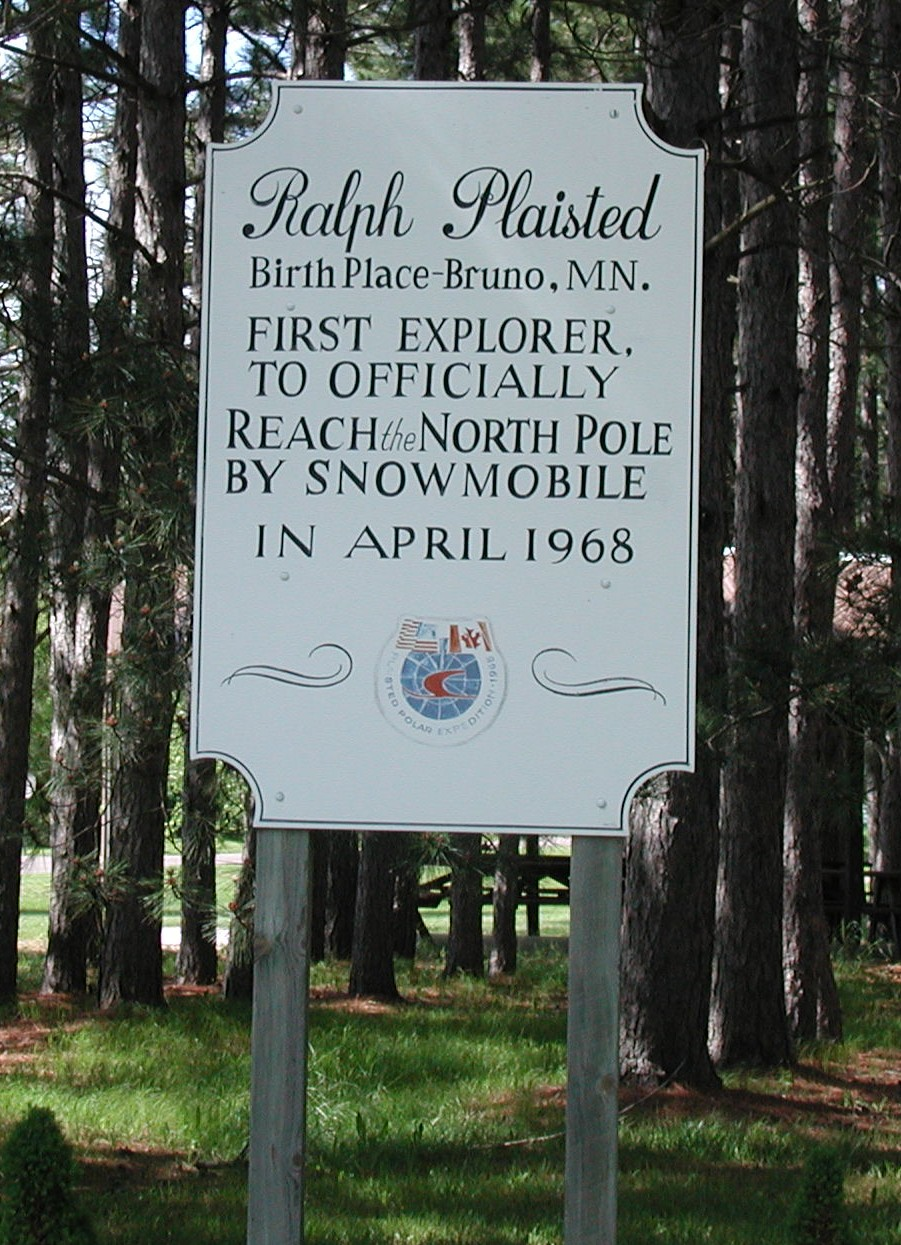
A sign in Bruno, Minnesota marking Plaisted's birthplace.

Plaisted was a high-school dropout from Bruno, Minnesota, who found success as an insurance salesman. An avid outdoorsman, in the early 1960s he was one of the first Minnesotans to buy a Ski-Doo snowmobile, a then-novel invention of Canada's Bombardier Company, and became a convert and promoter of the machine. In 1965, Plaisted drove his snowmobile 250 miles (400 km) from Ely to White Bear Lake, Minnesota, in one day, which is regarded as the first long-distance snowmobile trek.

== Arctic expedition ==
Plaisted and his friend Art Aufderheide conceived the idea of reaching the North Pole by snowmobile in the spring of 1966, aiming to make the trip the following year. Gordon Mikkelson (1929–1990) helped with snowmobiling and base camp logistics. Customized clothing was assembled for the team, which they tested by sleeping on a frozen lake in northern Minnesota. In April and May 1967, Plaisted's first attempt was thwarted at 83° 20' latitude by storms and open water. The attempt resulted in a CBS-TV documentary To the Top of the World, reported by Charles Kuralt, who accompanied the Plaisted team.

Plaisted returned for a successful attempt the following year in March 1968. Starting at Canada's Ward Hunt Island just a few miles from Peary's start at Cape Columbia on Ellesmere Island, Plaisted began the 412-mile (663 km) traverse on March 9.

Navigating with a sextant and resupplied when possible with fuel and supplies dropped by a turboprop DeHavilland Twin Otter, the expedition members spent 43 days, 11 hours traveling on the ice before reaching their final camp on the evening of April 19. Navigator Jerry Pitzl made hourly sextant sightings over the next two days to confirm their location. On the morning of April 20, the party journeyed somewhat less than four miles (6 km) to account for ice drift, and signaled a United States Air Force C-135 weather reconnaissance aircraft using a handheld radio. At 10:30 am Eastern Daylight Time, the aircraft, call sign LARK-47, flew overhead confirming the party was exactly at the North Pole. The party was then flown out.

Given the doubts surrounding the North Pole conquest claims of Robert Peary and Frederick Cook, Ralph Plaisted's journey, the Plaisted Polar Expedition, is regarded as the first undisputed surface conquest of the North Pole. Affidavits signed by resupply pilots Welland Phipps and Ken Lee confirm that the expedition did not cover any distance by air.

== Personal life ==
Plaisted served in the United States Navy as a baker during World War II. He was married three times; his third marriage, to Riki Magnolo, lasted 31 years, until her death in 1998. Plaisted was survived by a son and two daughters.
