= Aleksandr Kuznetsov (explorer) =

Expedition leader

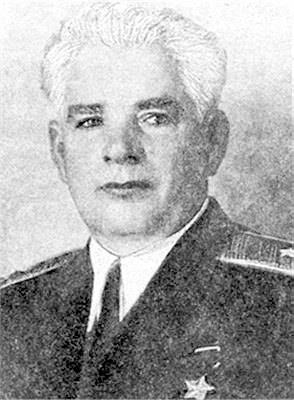

Aleksandr Kuznetsov was the expedition leader of the first undisputed team to set foot on the North Pole. Other claimants, notably Frederick Cook (1908) and Robert Peary (1909) have been criticized for a lack of supporting logs, having no one to confirm sextant readings, or for other reasons.

Kuznetsov led the Sever-2 team of Soviet scientists who flew and landed three Lisunov Li-2s at the North Pole on April 23, 1948. Soundings made by the team were the first to indicate an underwater mountain ridge beneath the ice and water at the North Pole.
