= Vasily Igorevich Yelagin =

Vasily Igorevich Yelagin (Russian: Василий Игоревич Елагин; born 20 February 1953) is a Russian mountaineer and explorer, head of the MLAE-2008, MLAE-2009, MLAE-2011, MLAE-2013, MLAE-2014, and MLAE-2015 expeditions.

For his second Himalayas expedition (1989) he was awarded the Order of the Red Banner of Labour.
