= William Pershing Benedict =

20th-century decorated fighter pilot and polar explorer

- Born: William Pershing Benedict; 20 July 1918
- Died: 31 August 1974 (aged 56)

William Pershing Benedict (July 20, 1918 – August 31, 1974) was an American pilot who was born in Ruth, Nevada and raised in California. He was a highly decorated World War II fighter pilot who served in both the RCAF and the U.S. Army Air Forces. 18 months after joining the U.S. Army Air Forces, at 26 years of age, Benedict achieved the rank of Major and was made Squadron Commander. He is best known for being the first American man to land an aircraft on the North Pole.

== Early life ==
Benedict joined the Royal Canadian Air Force in July 1940. After training, he was sent to Great Britain where he flew Spitfires, and was later transferred to North Africa. In March 1942 he was assigned to 127 Squadron RAF. He was shot down on July 16, 1942, while flying a Hurricane, but parachuted to safety. On December 14, 1942, Benedict transferred to the U.S. Army Air Corps, where he flew Curtiss P-40s and later P-47 Thunderbolts. He returned to the U.S. on leave and married his Canadian fiancée on January 7, 1945. He then returned to Europe for the remainder of the war.

== Landing at North Pole ==
The Soviet Union had already accomplished this task unbeknownst to the U.S. Government at the time. Wanting the Air Force to get credit for the first landing on the North Pole, General Old, Commander of the Alaskan Air Command, asked Major Benedict to take what he needed and command the first flight to land on the North Pole. The historic landing was accomplished on May 3, 1952, in a U.S. Air Force C-47 modified with skis. Readings taken by the scientists accompanying Benedict and his crew verified that they were the first American men to set foot on the exact geographical North Pole.

== Post-Air Force years ==
Benedict retired from the Air Force in 1962 with the rank of Lieutenant Colonel. He then worked as a firefighting pilot in California where he was killed in a plane crash on August 31, 1974, while flying a Grumman F7F Tigercat dropping fire retardant in the Ukiah area.

== Literature ==
- Common, Charles A.: Born to Fly: Some Life Sketches of Lieutenant Colonel William H. Benedict, self-published in 2002; revised in 2006.
- Smith, E.A.W.: Benedict's Wars, Red Leader Press, 2005. ISBN 1-885832-37-0.
- Thruelsen, Major Richard and Arnold, Lieutenant Elliot: Mediterranean Sweep, chapter titled, The Scroungers, pg. 63–79, Duell, Sloan, and Pearce, 1944.
