= List of firsts at the Geographic North Pole =

This is a list of firsts at the Geographic North Pole.

- First flight over North Pole (disputed): On May 9, 1926, Americans Richard E. Byrd and pilot Floyd Bennett claimed a successful flight over the North Pole in a Fokker F-VII Tri-motor called the Josephine Ford. Byrd took off from Spitsbergen and returned to the same airfield. His claim, widely accepted at first, has been challenged since.
- First flight over North Pole (confirmed): On May 12, three days after the Byrd flight, Norwegian Roald Amundsen, his American sponsor Lincoln Ellsworth and the Italian aeronautic engineer Umberto Nobile flew over the Pole in the semi-rigid airship Norge, designed and piloted by Nobile. The total crew was 16 men. The Norge began in Spitsbergen and flew to Alaska.
- First flight over North Pole in an airplane (confirmed): Valery Chkalov and two others flew a Tupolev ANT-25 on June 18–20, 1937 from Moscow to Vancouver, Washington.
- First North Pole ice station: North Pole-1 (Soviet Union) was established at 89°25′N 78°40′W (about 20 kilometres (12 mi) from the North Pole) on May 21, 1937. The expedition members: oceanographer Pyotr Shirshov, meteorologist Yevgeny Fyodorov, radio operator Ernst Krenkel, and the leader Ivan Papanin conducted scientific research at the station for the next 274 days. On February 19, 1938, the group was evacuated by the ice breakers Taimyr and Murman. The station had drifted 2850 km (1,770 mi) and was approaching the eastern coast of Greenland.
- First landing at and first to stand on North Pole : three planes of Sever-2 expedition (Soviet Union) of 24 scientists and flight crew led by Aleksandr Kuznetsov. Pilots: Ivan Cherevichnyy, Vitaly Maslennikov and Ilya Kotov. Cherevichnyy's plane was the first one to land at 4:44pm (Moscow Time, UTC+04:00) on April 23, 1948.
- First to parachute onto North Pole: Vitaly Volovich and Andrei Medvedev (Soviet Union) on May 9, 1949, from Douglas C-47 Skytrain, registered CCCP H-369.
- First vessel to reach North Pole: the submarine USS Nautilus. August 3, 1958
- First to reach North Pole by surface travel (on Ski-Doo): Ralph Plaisted. April 19, 1968
- First to reach the North Pole by dogsled: team led by Sir Wally Herbert. 1968-69
- First surface ship to reach North Pole: nuclear-powered icebreaker Arktika (Soviet Union). August 17, 1977
- First to ski from continent to North Pole: Dmitry Shparo, Jury Khmelevsky, Vladimir Ledenev, Anatoly Melnikov, Vladimir Rakmanov, Vasily Shishkarev and Vadim Davydov (Soviet Union). March 16-May 31, 1979
- First to reach North Pole on dogs without resupply (one-way trip, flew home from pole): Will Steger International Polar Expedition. May 1, 1986. The team members were: Paul Schurke, Brent Boddy, Richard Weber, Geoff Carroll, Ann Bancroft, Will Steger and a team of 21 dogs. Brent Boddy & Richard Weber became the first Canadians to reach the North Pole on foot while Ann Bancroft became the first woman to trek to the Pole.
- First helicopter flight: Australian Dick Smith on 28 April 1987 in Bell Jetranger II VH-DIK.
- First surface crossing of the Arctic Ocean on skis: Soviet–Canadian 1988 Polar Bridge Expedition, from Northern Siberia to Ellesmere Island National Park Reserve in Canada, via the North Pole. Team members: 9 Soviets (Dmitry Shparo, Mikhail Malakhov, Vladimir Ledenov, Yury Khemeleski, Vasily Shishkariov, Alexandr Beliaev, Anatoly Melnikhov) and 4 Canadians (Richard Weber, Christopher Holloway, Max Buxton, Laurie Dexter). Richard Weber (Canadian team leader) became the first person to reach the North Pole from both sides of the Arctic Ocean.
- First command journey to North Pole unassisted: 1989 Vladimir Chukov «Arctica-89» Expedition. No dogs, air planes, or re-supplies. They departed Arctic Cape on March 15 and only seven of 13 people reached the Pole on May 6. One died 150 km before Pole, five were deported halfway.
- First solo journey to North Pole unassisted: 1994 Børge Ousland expedition. No outside help, no dogs, air planes, or re-supplies. He departed Arctic Cape on March 2 and reached the Pole skiing.
- First command journey to North Pole unassisted, successful (everyone reached): 1994 Vladimir Chukov «Arctica-94» Expedition. No outside help, no dogs, air planes, or re-supplies. They departed Arctic Cape on March 15 and reached the Pole on May 17 by the same starting command of eight skiers.
- First journey to North Pole and return unassisted: 1995 Weber Malakhov Expedition. Richard Weber and Mikhail Malakhov became the first to reach the North Pole and return to their starting point on land (Ward Hunt, Canada), with no outside help, no dogs, air planes, or re-supplies. They departed Ward Hunt on February 14 and reached the Pole eighty one days later, on May 12. On June 15, they were back at Ward Hunt establishing a record of 108 days for the longest unsupported polar journey.
- First scuba dive at North Pole: Andrei Rozhkov (Russia) on April 22, 1998 (ended in fatality).
- First unsupported, unassisted, ski crossing of the Arctic Ocean from Russia to Canada through the North Pole. Russian - Slovak team; Peter Valušiak, Vladimir Čukov, Ivan Kuželivskij, Valerij Kochanov, (23 February - 20 June 1998). The documentary film 118 DAYS IN CAPTIVITY OF ICE tells this story.
- First unsupported ski crossing of the Arctic Ocean: Rune Gjeldnes and Torry Larsen, in 109 days; they passed through the North Pole on April 29, 2000.
- First unsupported solo trek from Canada to North Pole: Pen Hadow reached the Pole May 19, 2003.
- First to reach North Pole during the Arctic winter: Børge Ousland and Mike Horn. March 23, 2006
- First to reach North Pole on snowshoes exclusively: April 26, 2006 North Pole Classic. Richard Weber guided Conrad Dickinson to the North Pole with no re-supplies. This was Richard Weber's fifth full North Pole expedition. He has trekked to the North Pole more than anyone in history.
- First to dive sea bottom at North Pole: Arktika 2007 expedition on August 2, 2007, by two MIR submarines. Crew members were: Arthur Chilingarov, Anatoly Sagalevich and Vladimir Gruzdev on MIR-1; Yevgeny Chernyaev, Mike McDowell and Frederik Paulsen on MIR-2.
- First woman pilot to command a Boeing 777 on the world's longest flight over North Pole: Zoya Agarwal with an all women flight crew.
- <

Section for magnetic North Pole firsts (note that the magnetic North Pole does move over time):

- First to drive an automobile to the North Pole was Jeremy Clarkson with James May, with Richard Hammond and a crew of 7 others tasked to assist and document the journey. They drove a Toyota Hilux modified by Arctic Trucks and completed the trip faster than a dog sled they were racing. The journey was documented in Top Gear: Polar Special which was first broadcast on 25 July 2007.
