= North to the Pole =

1986 book by Will Steger and Paul Schurke

- Author: Will Steger, Paul Schurke
- Language: English
- Publication date: 1986

The book North to the Pole, written by Will Steger and Paul Schurke, was published in 1986. It is a first-person account of an expedition to the North Pole and illustrates how seven men and one woman set out by dog-sled to accomplish the goal of completing an expedition to the North Pole without resupply and only with the help of traditional navigation techniques. The expedition is successfully completed within 56 days, and the crew is much praised and celebrated for it, especially by the media.

The book, written in the style of a diary, includes the description of the eight- week expedition to the North Pole. In addition, it provides extra information about the three years of planning, preparations and training of the crew. The expedition starts on March 1, 1986 as the crew around Steger and Co. charter a plane from Frobisher Bay on Baffin Island in Canada's eastern Arctic to leave to Ellesmere Island, from where they are starting their expedition to the North Pole. On board the plane are the crew, the sled dogs, equipment and supplies. Their take-off and departure to Ellesmere Island is accompanied by a media team. The expedition is financed through fundraising and donations.

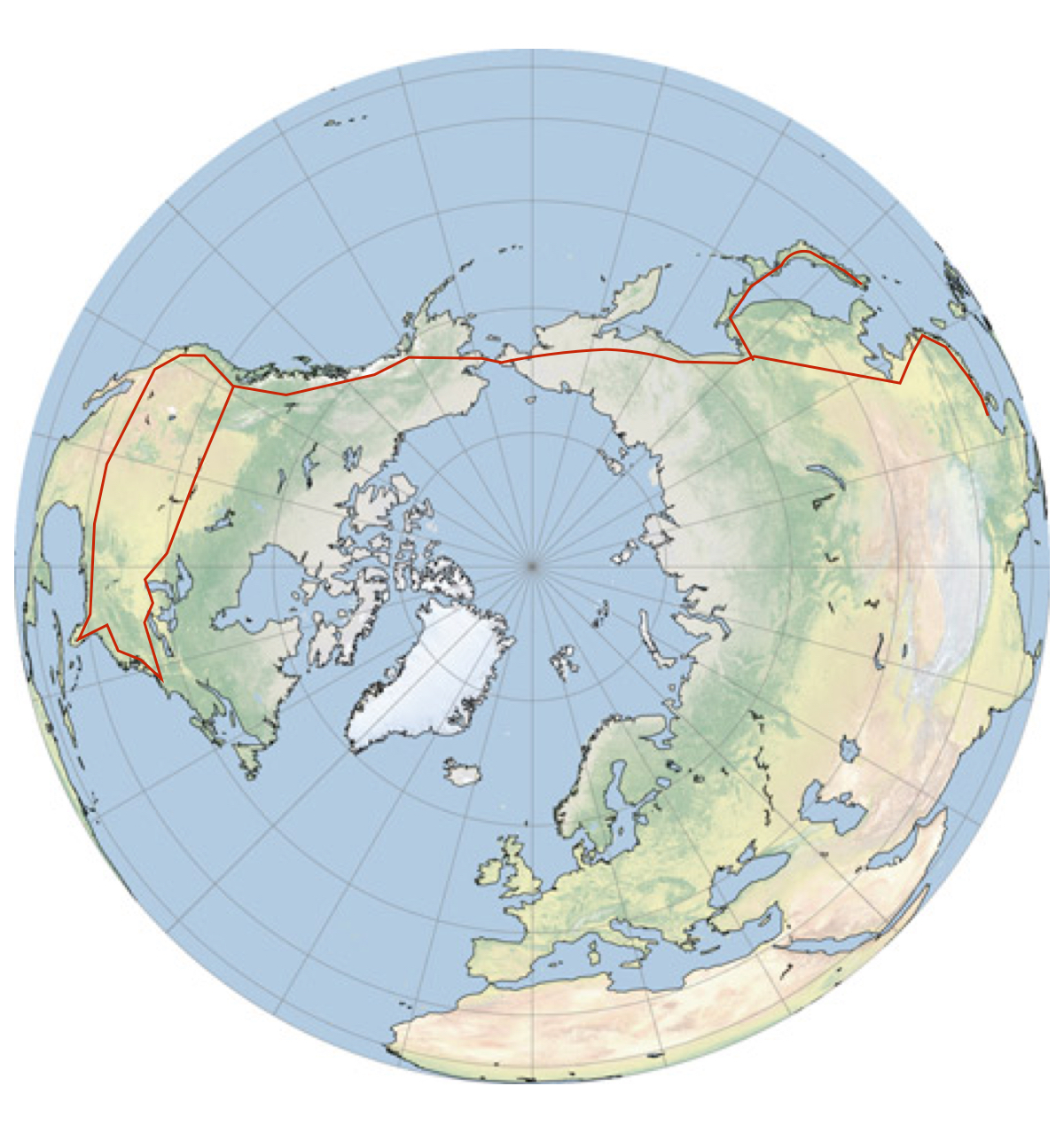
Map of the North Pole

== The crew ==
The book contains biographical information about the two leading figures of that expedition, Schurke and Steger, who are the two initiators and authors of the book.

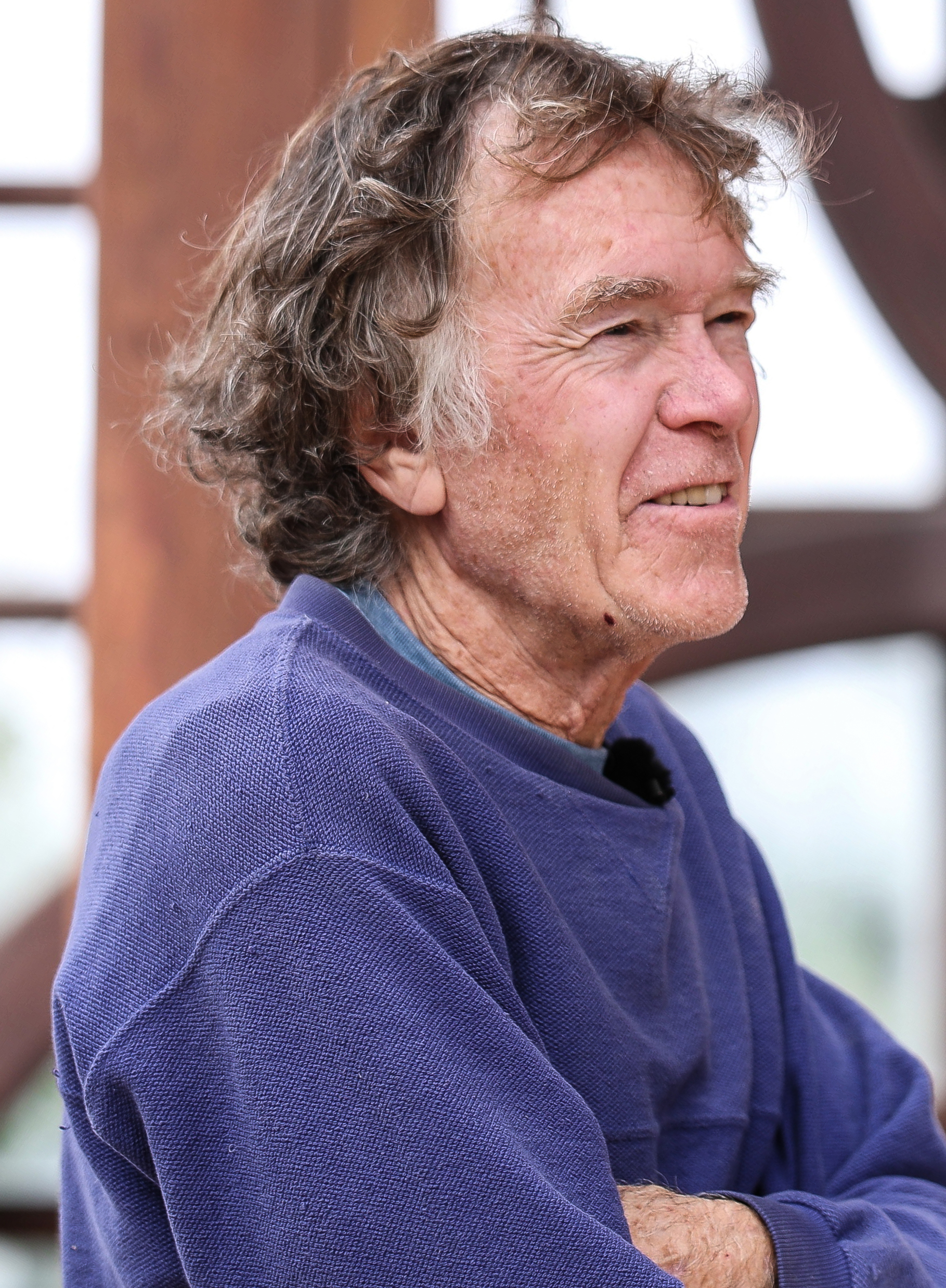
Will Steger

"Ever since I was a child, I had dreamed about the remote places of the world, like the one the North Star leads to. I believe I was a born explorer."- Will Steger

Will Steger was born as the second oldest of nine children and grew up in the suburbs of Minneapolis. His parents supported his curiosity and allowed him the freedom to explore from an early age on. While other adolescents turned their interests to sports, Steger was "drawn ever more steadily toward the outdoors and adventure". He then studied geology at St. Thomas in St. Paul and got a master's degree in education. He constantly spent his summers in the north and decided at the age of 25 to move north to a remote tract of land. He started to lead wilderness trips and workshops there and finally started his own winter business in 1973, where he would introduce young people to dogsledding, snowshoeing and skiing and led winter camping trips.

"It's not the size of your resources or abilities that counts, it's the size of your dreams"- Paul Schurke

Paul Schurke, the co-leader of the expedition, was born and raised in Minneapolis. Similar to Steger, he also showed a great interest in adventure from an early age on. During his youth he became involved in many outdoor education programs. After graduating from St. John's University in 1977, he and a friend founded a nonprofit program that offered wilderness adventure trips. In 1980 he met Will Steger while looking for a winter outlet and they started planning their expedition.

The rest of the crew consists of Ann Bancroft, Bob McKerrow, Geoff Carroll, Richard Weber, Bob Mantell, and Brent Boddy.

== The expedition in the media ==
The National Geographic reported in an article by Dave Freeman in 2015 that Will Steger received the "John Oliver La Gorce Medal" in 1995 which is an award "only been given 19 times since National Geographic was founded in 1888". Steger follows the important explorers Roald Amundsen, Amelia Earhart, Admiral Robert Peary and Jacques- Yves Cousteau in gaining this honor. In 1996, Will Steger received an award by "National Geographic" to be "National Geographic's first "explorer in- residence". On May 6, 1986, The New York Times reported about the expedition with an article by Christopher S. Wren titled "Back from Pole, explorer describes grueling trek". In this article, Ann's accident as well as Schurke's readings for the navigation are emphasized besides Steger's first comments on the journey. In 1989, the journal Sports Illustrated published the article "The Iceman Cometh" by Robert Sullivan reporting about Steger's trip to the Pole. There are still a lot of reports about Steger's expedition on several websites like the ones from The American Polar Society, National Geographic and the International Polar Foundation.

== Motifs ==
=== Gender ===
Michael Robinson (2015) points out in his article "Manliness and Exploration" that "Gradually over the course of the nineteenth century, polar exploration had come to represent a place of manly contest rather than scientific investigation". In Steger's team there is Bancroft as a female contribution to the male dominated North Pole exploration domain. In the first week, Bancroft's character is introduced and Steger writes about how she joined the team. His male opinion is shown as well as his critical attitude that a woman would cover the eighth spot in the expedition team: "Our concern centered on protecting our credibility. To add a woman would magnify press coverage of the project, but would leave us vulnerable to accusations of tokenism". Steger is afraid that their credibility in the media would diminish just because a woman joins their team. This is also shown by Steger's thought: "But what if she couldn't adjust to being with seven men, or couldn't handle the physical demands of the polar sea?" A female arctic explorer is reduced to her femininity and the men fear that she is not able to manage the severe circumstances. On the other hand, Bancroft fulfills the role of a female family member: "But we felt that female representation would lead to a stronger sense of "family" among the group and add to the significance of the project". In Robinson's essay (2015), the role of Elsa Barker being a ghostwriter for the Arctic explorer Robert Peary is discussed: in this context, the article speaks of "Women's sentimental literature" which was supposed to improve the male stories from the explorer and to add more feelings into the "dry" narrations. Not only Steger and his team members reduce Bancroft to her female attributes but also the press is focused on her and how she is doing during the expedition. When Bancroft has an accident in the sixth week, she is calm and collected afterwards. However, in the media this accident is the most discussed event of their journey to the Pole. Society does not have confidence in women to work equally with men. Peary himself asked for "Someone who has the big, masculine literary instinct" showing his critical attitude towards women as writers.

=== Man vs. nature ===
Steger's expedition team is dependent on the weather since if there is too much fog or storm, they are not able to carry on with their journey. They receive messages via satellite beacons to get information about the weather forecast. On Day 30 and Day 31 the team cannot continue traveling due to the windy weather thus the fate goes hand in hand with nature. The team accepts the storm and tries to gain back their power for the journey through sleeping. The nature with its changing weather is more powerful than the human beings and determines people's behavior seen in the example of Mantell. Due to his injury he has to leave the Pole. This shows that fate is connected with nature and is more dominant than the men. The weather phenomenon concerning the ice conditions relates to the fact whether there are gaps in the ice or if the ice is thick enough. The landscape in Steger's story is often fragmented which prevents the team to move on with their journey. Since this expedition took place in 1986, this situation has even become more serious due to climate change. James D. Ford and Tristan Pearce (2010) discuss in their article research about the Inuvialuit Settlement Region (ISR) in the Western Canadian arctic and reveal that "more unpredictable weather, changing ice dynamics with thinner ice and earlier ice- break- up" will occur. Human beings are dependent on the weather including its climate change conditions since the people living there are reliant on the food transport. In Steger's story the thin ice is a problem because it means a delay for their journey, which stresses the superiority of nature and that people have to deal with the vulnerability of the climate. Not only ice conditions and cold temperatures can be problematic for the team but also the Transpolar Drift Stream shows its power: "Furthermore, we knew that if we slept, we'd be placing ourselves at the mercy of the Transpolar Drift Stream and would likely awaken farther away from the Pole". The determination of Steger's team does not only make for progress but also prevents them from losing much time and encountering dangerous situations.

=== Collaboration ===
One important motif in Steger's North to the Pole is the collaboration and team spirit among the exploration team. Their vision to get to the Pole like Peary did in 1909 can only work if they stick together and collaborate with each other.The team again has struggles with the ice conditions. They often encounter fragmented ice meaning big gaps which are impossible to cross with their sleds. Boddy is stopped by an open lead, "bronze-colored water that stretched across our route". While the others are looking for a closed passage to pass, Schurke comes up with the solution of a "bridge- building project". Teamwork is required since one person on its own could never manage heaping ice blocks in this short time due to especially physical matters. After passing this lead successfully, Steger writes: "We applauded ourselves for this successful lead- crossing strategy, and enjoyed a sense of unity". Pride and optimism become apparent through this collaboration and in particular the team spirit is stressed. The team feels united and realizes that working together brings them closer to their goal. Steger himself emphasizes the important contribution of Schurke to the team's success when claiming "A day's travel on the wrong bearing would cost us the Pole". He stresses "the massive responsibility" and also his "complete faith in Schurke's ability" which points out a lot of respect for his work and that he appreciates his help. Furthermore, Weber's qualities to bear responsibility for someone else's dog team are mentioned: "And Richard did an admirable job even of taking over someone else's team, which is a frustrating job even under the best conditions". Weber's contribution to the team is indicated, namely being a leading figure, flexible and mentally strong to push the explorer team forward. Collaboration was already required when Robert Peary did his final attempt to reach the North Pole from 1908 to 1909. Robert Bartlett (1875– 1946) was the captain of Peary's ship called "Roosevelt" as Deirdre C. Stam elaborates in the article "Interpreting captain Bob Bartlett's AGS notebook chronicling significant parts of Peary's 1908– 09 North Pole expedition" for the National Geographic. Bartlett "also took part in Peary's elaborate system of successive support teams travelling to and from Cape Columbia", from where he travelled by sledge to his polar target. Bartlett's contribution to the trip was also characterized by collaboration. Surprisingly, Peary did not take him to the Pole furthermore. He decided to replace him for Matthew Henson; he also considered him as a collaborative person. Nevertheless, this example of not fulfilling promises to captain Bartlett, in particular that he is not allowed to accompany Peary to the North Pole, despite his efforts and talent, does not support the idea of collaboration. Therefore, a sort of collaboration is necessary to go to the Pole together as a team, even though in this example the responsible people on Peary's last attempt were exchanged.

=== Determination ===
The determination of each team member is enormous and is the leading factor for that journey, although the determination is challenged at times in that expedition. If anyone of the crew had not been determined to go on that expedition, none of them would have chosen to go. Thus, determination can be regarded as a basic requirement for starting that journey to the North Pole. In the beginning, Steger already states that their determination "[is] as strong as ever" and has been there from an early age on. About his childhood he says:"Ever since I was a child, I had dreamed about the remote places of the world, like the one the North Star leads to. I was a born explorer". All of the other team members have drawn their focus to the explorer life more or less from an early age on. Determination is also linked here with hard work and a strong belief and trust in one's own skills. Steger's parents already taught him at an early age that "they could reach [their] goals if [they are] willing to work very hard for them". In addition to that, the hard work and strong will they put into the expedition is shown in their extensive and tedious training they go through prior to this expedition. It took three years of planning, training and preparing and a lot of money to make that expedition happen- Determination is the key in that regard to stay focused and hooked on such a thing. The fact that Steger and Schurke are constantly rearranging their strategy contributes to that as well. They want to make the most efficient progress to reach their goal. However, determination is challenged at times too. In week three of the expedition Stege] writes:" We had sensed seeds of disillusionment among the team regarding our plan to reach the Pole". Week three is a particularly challenging phase of the expedition. The crew fears that they are not going to accomplish their goal of reaching the Pole without resupply and McKerrow also announces that he is going to leave the expedition due to health issues. After the first airlift the mood of the crew is up again, though, and they find their motivation once more. Determination is something that Steger and Co. share with the world's great explorers Nansen and Peary, "who were drawn north by the polar spirit" as well.

=== Interdependence ===
To achieve their goal of reaching the pole the crew is dependent on several external forces and is in a state of interdependence, especially with their sled-dogs. On Day 51 of the journey, Steger and Schurke are writing that the crew is tired and exhausted and "plagued by sore feet". But what is even worse for the crew in that situation is that their dogs are terribly exhausted and languishing as well. The worst aspect though, is that one of their strongest and "most consistent" dogs, named Dillon, collapsed. That does not only force them to pause and recline, but also leads to trouble in their tight schedule. The crew does seem to know that they heavily rely on their dogs, which is pointed out in the fact that the dog is given an extra ration of food on that day. Further into the story, on Day 54 it is written:

"All of the dogs were now completely famished, but their spirits were still good. Our dog-food supply was nearly exhausted, so to keep them going we had given up our own rations of pemmican, butter, and the nut-butter bars we ate for lunch. "(Steger, Schurke 295)

A mutual dependency is noticeable here, pointing to interdependence. The crew apparently needs the sled dogs for locomotion, but on the other hand the dogs also need the people for nutrition. In this case the crew even prefers the certainty of the dogs' well-being, instead of their own. The crew is aware of the physical hardships that the dogs endure during journeys such as these, and try to meet their needs. Steger writes in regard to this: "The dogs sense when we are hungry, tired, and cold. They know that our survival is linked with theirs. For me, the mystique of long treks by dogsled lies in this bond". The team depends on a good bond between people and dogs, because only then the crew is able to rely on the dogs' response to commands for example. The interdependence is thereby of huge importance here to make their dream come true.

The interdependence between humans and dogs in that expedition is characterized by "mutual respect" and "develops a lasting relationship, one that is based on trust, respect, and affection". Thus, the crew looks after the dogs' needs and takes break whenever they feel they are exhausted. Kerrie Ann Shannon writes in her MA thesis in regard to the unique role of sled dogs in Inuit culture: "The concepts of reciprocity and sharing, respect, and continuity are important in a relationship with animals and this relationship in turn influences human social interaction". A good relationship between humans and dogs is therefore crucial and has a great influence on the social interaction of them and also on the success of that expedition.

=== Bibliography ===
Primary Literature:

- Steger, W. and Schurke, P. (1987): "North to the Pole" United States: Minnesota Historical Society Press.

Secondary Literature:

- Ford, James D and Tristan Pearce (2010) "What we know, do not know, and need to know about climate change vulnerability in the western Canadian Arctic: a systematic literature review" Environ. Res. Lett. 5 014008
- Robinson, M. (2015) "Manliness and Exploration: The Discovery of the North Pole" Osiris 30: 89- 109
- Shannon, K. (1997) "The unique role of sled dogs in Inuit culture" Canada: University of Alberta, Edmonton
- Stam, D. C. (2017) "Interpreting Captain Bob Bartlett's AGS notebook chronicling significant parts of Peary's 1908– 09 North Pole expedition" Geographical Review 107 (1): 185- 206. Downloaded October 24, 2019,
- Sullivan, R. (1989) https://www.si.com/vault/1989/07/31/120259/the-iceman-cometh-will-steger-once-a-footloose-north-woods-hippie-conquered-boardrooms-and-blizzards-to-lead-a-historic-expedition-to-the-north-pole-in-1986-now-he-means-to-traverse-antarctica Accessed October 22, 2019,
- Wren, Christopher S. (1986) https://www.nytimes.com/1986/05/06/science/back-from-pole-explorer-describes-grueling-trek.html Accessed October 22, 2019,

Websites mentioned:

- The American Polar Society https://www.americanpolar.org/about/polar-luminaries/will-steger/ Accessed October 22, 2019,
- International Polar Foundation http://www.explorapoles.org/explorers/profile/steger_will Accessed October 22, 2019,

Pictures:

- Climate Generation https://www.climategen.org/blog/paul-schurke-explorers-modern Accessed October 29, 2019,
- Climate Generation https://www.climategen.org/who-we-are/our-approach/ Accessed October 29, 2019
