= Bob McKerrow =

- Born: Robert James McKerrow; 21 March 1948 (age 78); Dunedin, New Zealand
- Occupations: Humanitarian, mountaineer, polar traveller
- Years active: 1967–present
- Employer: International Federation of Red Cross and Red Crescent Societies
- Website: bobmckerrow.blogspot.com

Robert James "Bob" McKerrow (born 21 March 1948), a native of New Zealand, is a humanitarian, mountaineer, polar traveller, writer and poet. He currently works as Country Coordinator for the Swiss Red Cross in the Philippines working on the Typhoon Haiyan (Yolanda) operation. When the Indian Ocean tsunami struck on 26 December 2004, McKerrow worked in India, Sri Lanka, Maldives and Indonesia, coordinating Red Cross programmes for people affected by the tsunami for an eight-year period.

He was Editor of the New Zealand Adventure Magazine in 1989 and 1990, and continues to write and contribute photographs to various magazines, websites, and blogs. He has published a number of his poems in the New Zealand Alpine Journal and North & South Magazine, and wrote a biography of mountaineer Ebenezer Teichelmann.

== Early life ==
McKerrow was born in Dunedin, New Zealand on 21 March 1948 and is registered as "Robert James McKerrow" in the Deaths, Births and Marriages office in Dunedin.

McKerrow was a leading middle-distance runner from the age of 13, and broke the Otago provincial record for Under 17, and later Under 19, 880 yards (800 m) with a time of one minute, 57.8 seconds. He won a number of athletic titles at the Otago and Southland Inter-Secondary school championships, and ran his first marathon at 17, recording a time of three hours, 10 seconds. He represented Otago province at junior level athletics and rugby before turning his attention to venturing into the hills and mountains, where he established himself as a mountaineer and skier.

== Mountaineering and polar travel ==
At the age of 19, McKerrow was selected to be a member of a New Zealand mountaineering expedition to Peru, to the remote Cordillera Vilcabamba. The expedition spent four months climbing and exploring. McKerrow climbed 12 peaks and did eight first ascents. The most notable climb was the first ascent of the north face of Mellizos with John E.S.Lawrence.

In 1969/70, he spent 13 months in Antarctica as a member of New Zealand's Department of Scientific and Industrial Research Antarctic Expedition where he was in charge of seismology, geomagnetics and earth currents. He went first to Scott Base in early October 1969, and in January 1970 moved to Vanda Station in the Wright Valley, and was part of a four-man team that wintered over in Antarctica. At that time, the four-person party was the smallest ever expedition to winter over in. In an era of self-regulation, the team did many winter trips with temperatures frequently between −40 and −50 °C (−40 and −58 °F), including trips into the Asgard Range and McKerrow attempting Mount Newall with Gary Lewis.

McKerrow has climbed and trekked extensively in New Zealand, Europe, Peru, Antarctica, Borneo, East Africa, Nepal, India, Central Asia, and has also been a member expeditions to the Arctic and Antarctic.

In 1985, polar explorer and arctic conservationist Will Steger invited McKerrow to join him on a training expedition in preparation for an unsupported trip with dogs to the North Pole the following year. McKerrow, Steger, Paul Schurke, Bob Mantell, and Richard Weber departed the settlement of Arctic Red River (now Tsiigehtchic) on the Mackenzie River and travelled downriver to the Arctic Ocean, and then along the coast of Canada to Demarcation Point. They crossed into Alaska, and continued to Point Barrow, a trip of 1,500 kilometres (930 mi). McKerrow took part in the unsupported 1986 North Pole expedition, but had to be airlifted out after a month with broken ribs.

In 2011, a 25th anniversary of their North Pole Expedition was held in Minneapolis and at this public event, team members shared their own eyewitness stories on climate change: Canadians Richard Weber and Brent Boddy talked about a loss of thick, old, multi-year ice, shortened dogsledding seasons and the loss of the summer sea ice in the Arctic Ocean; wildlife biologist, Geoff Carroll provided his insight into impacts to Alaska's large land mammals he studies, like caribou and musk ox; McKerrow talked about communities in the Bay of Bengal being squeezed out by rising water levels; and Bob Mantell talked about the impact of the BP oil spill on communities in New Orleans, where he lives. Paul Schurke joined Will with a call to action to address climate change; and Ann Bancroft acknowledged the impact the expedition had on her career and thanked the team and all of Minnesota for the gifts afforded her and the entire team.

McKerrow has three times competed in the Coast to Coast, which is a multisport competition that features running, cycling and kayaking elements over a total of 243 kilometres (151 mi). In 1983 and 1985, he competed as an individual, and after a serious ankle injury in 1987, he competed once more in 1990 as a team member, covering the cycling and kayaking legs. He covered four further events as a journalist and co-wrote the 1994 book Coast to Coast: The Great New Zealand Race.

Sea kayaking is another of McKerrow's passions; he has done a double crossing of Cook Strait, and a 10-hour solo crossing from Raumati Beach to Cape Jackson, New Zealand. In 1988 he joined world-famous sea kayaker Paul Caffyn in an attempt to do the first kayak crossing of the Tasman Sea from Australia to New Zealand. They were arrested by the Maritime Police for not having a large radar reflector.

== Humanitarian work ==
McKerrow first worked in Asia in 1971 as a member of the New Zealand Red Cross refugee welfare team to Vietnam, working on livelihood programmes. During a break from his work in 71 he went to Sabah and did a solo ascent of Mount Kinabalu.

McKerrow has worked for the Red Cross in New Zealand, Vietnam, Bangladesh, India, Geneva, Afghanistan (four years), Pakistan, Sri Lanka, Nepal, Maldives, Ethiopia, Indonesia, Cambodia, Fiji, Papua New Guinea, Solomon Islands, Vanuatu, Kiribati, Tonga, Western Samoa, the Cook Islands and now in the Philippines. He has also been head of the regional delegations of the International Federation of Red Cross and Red Crescent Societies for Central Asia and South Asia.

Recognised as a world leader in disaster relief and recovery he also demonstrated his skills in risk and security management over many decades in extreme situations.world leader in disaster recovery. He was invited by The Insurance Brokers of New Zealand (IBANZ) to their annual conference in Auckland on 14 July 2011 as keynote speaker. Bob McKerrow has been involved in 15 earthquake relief-to-recovery operations including Tonga, India, Afghanistan, Nepal, Tajikistan, Uzbekistan, Kyrgyzstan and up until mid 2013, heading the tsunami recovery in Indonesia and Sri Lanka.

McKerrow left the IFRC in August 2013, and in November 2013 took up the position of country coordinator for the Swiss Red Cross after the extremely devastating Super Typhoon Haiyan (or Yolanda as locally known) in the Philippines. Owen Podger presented a paper at the Australia & New Zealand Disaster and Emergency Management Conference in 2014 entitled 'Little Known Australian and New Zealand Innovators in Aceh who helped to redefine professionalism in disaster recovery' in which McKerrow's key role is defined. https://bobmckerrow.blogspot.com/2014/04/little-known-aussie-and-kiwi-innovators_4872.html

=== Indian Ocean tsunami ===
The Indian Ocean tsunami struck on 26 December 2004, and three months later a huge earthquake devastated the island of Nias. For the next four years, McKerrow worked on numerous disaster-relief operations throughout Indonesia, including the significant earthquakes of Benkulu, West Java and West Sumatra in late September 2009. McKerrow—along with Wayne Ulrich, a disaster-relief expert—experimented with an innovative approach to helicopter aerial-grid mapping based on inaccessibility, altitude, and destitution. Through this technique, using New Zealander helicopter pilot Colin Tuck, they paved the way for critical supply routes to be opened and provide urgent food and shelter materials.

In April 2009, together with Jerry Talbot Special Representative to the SG of IFRC, was invited to New York with Kuntoro Mangkasubroto, Minister for Tsunami, Government of Indonesia, to present the Tsunami Legacy Report to Bill Clinton, Ban Ki-moon, UNSG and Helen Clark, Director UNDP. McKerrow was involved with the compilation of the Tsunami Legacy report and the tsunami documentary that was shown on Discovery TV to mark five years of tsunami. Almost seven years after the tsunami struck, he is still working on drawing the operation in Sri Lanka to a close.

In July 2010 he took up appointment as head of delegation for IFRC in Sri Lanka with key tasks of drawing tsunami operations to a close, working with Sri Lanka Red Cross Society to implement a large programme in the north and east of the country, providing houses, livelihoods, water and sanitation plus community based first aid and risk reduction projects to people internally displaced by a war that lasted over 25 years. In July 2012 he led a 'breakthrough initiative' by signing an agreement with the Indian Government to implement the construction of 16,800 owner driven houses for extremely vulnerable people who lost everything in the war.

The New Zealand Listener ran a series on New Zealanders living abroad in 2010–2011 and in the edition of 5 February 2011, Editor David Lomas published an article he wrote detailing McKerrow's life. This article covered his early life, mountaineering and polar travel, his humanitarian work and his philosophy on life.

In late 2012, McKerrow was awarded three medals by the New Zealand Government: the NZ Operational Service Medal (NZOSM), NZ General Service Medal (NZGSM)(Vietnam) and the NZ Special Service Medal (NZSSM) (Asian tsunami) from the NZ Defence Force. He has also been awarded the New Zealand Red Cross Award of Merit For Outstanding Service three times: 1972 Bangladesh, 1973–74 Vietnam and 1998 for services rendered since 1974.

== Outdoor education ==
From 1983, McKerrow was Director of the New Zealand Outward Bound School at Anakiwa, New Zealand and wrote a number of publications of outdoor education and experiential learning. McKerrow introduced the first ever Over 60s course into the NZ Outward Bound School and expanded courses for youth at risk, physically and mentally challenged. He helped organize the first International Outward Bound Conference at Anakiwa New Zealand in 1983 and attended the 2nd conference in Malaysia in 1986. In 1984 he visited Outward Bound Schools in Singapore, Malaysia, England, Wales, Scotland and 3 schools in the US, bringing back new ideas to New Zealand. For two years (1988–89) he ran an experimental youth at risk programme for young people at the Arapaepae Outdoor Pursuits Centre for offenders labelled as 'designed for maximum security prisons.'

== Bibliography ==
- McKerrow, Bob (2006). Ebenezer Teichelmann: Cutting Across Continents. Introduction by Sir Edmund Hillary. New Delhi: Tara-India Research Press. ISBN 978-81-87943-87-7.
- McKerrow, Bob; Hamed, Abdul Samay (2003). Afghanistan: Mountains of our Minds. New Delhi: Tara Press. ISBN 978-81-88353-17-0.
- McKerrow, Bob; Woods, John (1994). Coast to Coast: The Great New Zealand Race. Christchurch, New Zealand: Shoal Bay Press. ISBN 978-0-908704-22-4.
- Erasmuson, Martin; Lauder, Glen A., eds. (1997). Wild Food for the Soul: a collection of new West Coast writing. Hokitika, New Zealand: Hokitika Live Poets Society. ISBN 978-0-473-04428-2. (Contains poems by McKerrow.)
