= Jon Bowermaster =

American journalist and oceans expert

- Born: June 29, 1954 (age 72); Normal, Illinois, U.S.
- Occupations: Oceans Expert, Journalist, Author, Filmmaker, Adventurer
- Website: www.jonbowermaster.com

Jon Bowermaster (born June 29, 1954) is an oceans expert, journalist, writer, filmmaker, adventurer and six-time grantee of the National Geographic Expeditions Council. One of the Society's 'Ocean Heroes,' his first assignment for National Geographic Magazine was documenting a 3,741 mile crossing of Antarctica by dogsled.

Bowermaster has written eleven books and produced and or directed more than thirty documentary films. His feature documentaries include Dear President Obama, Antarctica, on the Edge, After the Spill and Ghost Fleet. He is a longtime contributor to magazines ranging from The New York Times Magazine and The Atlantic to Outside and Rolling Stone.

His National Geographic-sponsored Oceans 8 project took him and his teams around the world by sea kayak over the course of ten years (1999–2008), bringing back stories from the Aleutian Islands to French Polynesia, Gabon to Tasmania, and more, reporting on how the planet's one ocean, its residents and various coastlines are faring in today's busy world. The project resulted in an eight-part television series for the National Geographic Channel.

For the past several years, Jon and his One Ocean Media Foundation / Oceans 8 Films team have focused on Hudson River Stories, a series of short films about the environmental risks to and hopes for the Hudson River Valley, the birthplace of the American environmental movement.

Bowermaster is a Visiting Lecturer at Bard College, in the Environment and Urban Studies Department. He hosts weekly radio show/podcast, 'The Green Radio Hour with Jon Bowermaster' on Radio Kingston.

Bowermaster lives in New York's Hudson Valley and is the President of the One Ocean Media Foundation and chairman of the advisory board of Adventurers and Scientists for Conservation.

== Background and education ==
Born in Normal, Illinois, in 1954, Bowermaster grew up in suburbs of Chicago and Rockford, Ill., until attending Drake University in Des Moines, Iowa, where he worked at the Des Moines Register for two years as a student. He graduated in 1976 with a bachelor's degree in journalism. In 1977, Bowermaster received his master's degree in public affairs reporting from American University in Washington, DC.

== Career ==
=== Early career ===
After graduate school, Bowermaster moved to New York City to work for New Times magazine, before returning to Iowa as co-founder and editor of the weekly alternative newspaper The Daily Planet (then The Planet). Living in Iowa from 1977 to 1984, he wrote his first book, Governor: An Oral Biography of Robert D. Ray, and worked in the commercial film business producing industrial films, television commercials and his first documentary films for Iowa Public Television. In 1985, Jon moved back to New York, taking a job as managing editor of Record magazine, owned and published by Rolling Stone. From 1986 to 1998, he worked as a freelance magazine writer for numerous national and international publications, including The New York Times Magazine, Atlantic Monthly, New Republic, Outside, Men's Journal and many more.

=== First National Geographic Assignment ===
In 1986, Bowermaster befriended polar explorer Will Steger – who had just returned from a historic, unsupported dogsled adventure to the North Pole. As Steger was negotiating the rights to the story of his upcoming Trans-Antarctica expedition, he introduced Jon to editors at the National Geographic Magazine who assigned Bowermaster to cover Steger's seven-month-long crossing of Antarctica by dogsled in 1989–1990.

=== OCEANS 8 ===
From 1998 to 2008, Bowermaster's OCEANS 8 project, a series of expeditions to explore the world's ocean from the seat of a sea kayak, allowed Jon and his teams—comprising some of the world's best photographers, filmmakers, scientists and navigators—to reach corners of the world rarely seen. The trips were funded primarily by grants from the National Geographic Expeditions Council and corporate sponsors including Mountain Hardwear, Timberland and others.

Bowermaster began the project with the dream of visiting each of the seven continents, plus Oceania. Comprising eight adventures, the long-term project took Bowermaster and his teams to the heart of the Aleutian Islands, down the coast of Vietnam, through the Tuamotu Atolls in French Polynesia, across the high plains of Bolivia/Chile/Argentina, and up the wild coastline of Gabon in West Africa. Bowermaster explored Croatia's Dalmatian Coast, and visited Tasmania in 2006. In February 2008, Bowermaster and his team completed the final expedition in the 10-year-long project, along the Antarctic Peninsula.

Stories from each OCEANS 8 expedition resulted in books, magazines, lectures, television programs and educational curriculum for the National Geographic Society.

=== Antarctica ===
After Bowermaster's first trip to Antarctica with Will Steger, he developed a passion for the continent and has made many trips back since, to both the high, cold interior and along its 600-mile Peninsula. In 2008 Bowermaster completed his ten-year OCEANS 8 project with a trip to the Larsen Ice Shelf and the Antarctic Peninsula, which is the subject of his 2009 film, TERRA ANTARCTICA: Rediscovering the Seventh Continent. The high-definition, hour-long film chronicles Bowermaster's exploration of the Peninsula by sea kayak, foot and small plane and was named the best "Ocean Issues" film at the 2009 BLUE Ocean Film Festival in Savannah, Georgia in June 2009.

=== Hudson River Stories ===
Bowermaster and his team at Oceans 8 Films have made more than twenty short films (5–25 minutes each) in the Hudson Valley of New York, where Bowermaster has lived for over thirty years. Hudson River Stories is the result of Jon's dedication to telling stories – environmental, cultural, political – about what was going on in his own backyard.

The Hudson Valley is known as the birthplace of the American environmental movement, its main geographic attraction being the Hudson River, which some call America's First River, or simply America's River. Initially the Hudson River Stories project focused on environmental risks (oil trains carrying explosive cargo; a leaky nuclear power plant on the river's edge; PCBs polluting the river and shutting down its fishery), but slowly morphed into more optimistic and hopeful stories (efforts to preserve the last remnants of Native American corn; a profile of Pete Seeger's "Clearwater," the environmental/education sloop celebrating its 50th anniversary; the successful undamming of tributaries allowing complete ecosystems to return).

=== Green Radio Hour with Jon Bowermaster ===
Since March 2018 Bowermaster has hosted the Green Radio Hour with Jon Bowermaster radio show and podcast. Broadcast live on Radio Kingston each Sunday, the conversations with local, national and international environmentalists, writers, filmmakers, artists and politicians focus on "green" issues. Guests have included Bill McKibben, Carl Safina, Wade David, Rep. Antonio Delgado and State Senator Michelle Hinchey, Josh Fox, Michael Mann, Paul Hawken, Andy Revkin, Ian Urbina and many more.

Link to the archives of conversations can be found here.

== Media coverage ==
Bowermaster's books, films and adventures have received significant media coverage in a wide range of outlets including The New York Times, National Geographic, The Washington Post, Scientific American, Men's Journal, ABC's Good Morning America, National Geographic Adventure, The Huffington Post, Condé Nast Traveler, Sierra Trading Post, PlumTV, EarthKeepers, Voice of America, ABC News, Forbes.com, Canoe & Kayak, Wend, Adventure Kayak, Paddler and Men's Vogue

== Awards and grants ==
- 2019, Human Rights Watch Film Festival Amsterdam, "Ghost Fleet" Best Activist Documentary Award and BNNVARA Audience Award
- 2019, World Wildlife Day Living Oceans, "Ghost Fleet" Best 'People and Oceans' Film
- 2019, Wild & Scenic Environmental Film Festival, "Ghost Fleet" Spirit of Activism Award, John de Graaf Environmental Filmmaking Award
- 2018, Hudson River Maritime Museum, Roger W. Mabie Award
- 2018, Food & Water Watch, Climate Change Champion
- 2018, New York Wild Film Festival, "City on the Water" Best Wild NY Film
- 2017, Best Shorts, "Restoring the Clearwater" Award of Excellence
- 2017, Center of Discovery, Green Shovel Award
- 2017, Impact Docs Awards, "Restoring the Clearwater" Award of Excellence
- 2016, Accolade Global Film Competition, Humanitarian Award Winner, "Dear President Obama" Grand Prize
- 2016, Accolade Global Film Competition Winner, "Dear President Obama" Award of Excellence
- 2016, IndieFest, "Dear President Obama" Winner
- 2016, IndieFest, "Dear President Obama" Humanitarian Award
- 2016, Impact Docs Awards, "After the Spill" Award of Excellence
- 2016, Parajanov-Vartanov Institute's Doc LA Film Festival, "Dear President Obama"
- 2014, Blue Ocean Festival, "Antarctica, On the Edge" Best Exploration and Innovation
- 2014, Catskill Mountainkeeper, Keeper of the Catskills Award
- 2013, Wild & Scenic Environmental Film Festival, "Dear Governor Cuomo" Best of Theme
- 2011, CMS Vatavaran International Film Festival, "SoLa, Louisiana Water Stories" Best of Festival
- 2011, Columbus International Film Festival, "SoLa, Louisiana Water Stories"
- 2009, BLUE Ocean Film Festival, "Terra Antarctica" Best Ocean Issues Film
- 2008, Croatia's "Golden Pen" award
- 2008, "Birthplace of the Winds," Best Adventure Travel film, Reel Paddling Film Festival
- 2007, Santa Barbara Ocean Film Festival, "OCEANS 8" Best Oceans Series
- 2007, Vancouver Mountain Film Festival, "Terra Antarctica" Best of Festival
- 2006, Explorer's Festival, Lodz, Poland
- 1999, Lowell Thomas award for Environmental Reporting
- 1998–2008, six grants from National Geographic Expeditions Council

== Bibliography ==
- Governor: An Oral Biography of Robert D. Ray, 1987
- Saving the Earth: A Citizen's Guide to Environmental Action, co-authored with Will Steger, 1990
- Crossing Antarctica, co-authored with Will Steger, 1993
- The Adventures and Misadventures of Peter Beard In Africa, 1993
- Over the Top of the World, co-authored with Will Steger, 1999
- Birthplace of the Winds: Adventuring in Alaska's Islands of Fire and Ice, 2001
- Aleutian Adventure: Kayaking in the Birthplace of the Winds, 2001
- Alone Against the Sea and Other True Adventures, 2004
- Descending the Dragon: My Journey Down the Coast of Vietnam, 2008
- Wildebeest in a Rainstorm: Profiles of Our Most Intriguing Adventurers, Conservationists, Shagbags and Wanderers, 2009
- Oceans: The Threats To Our Seas and What You Can Do To Turn The Tide, 2010

== Filmography ==
- Ghost Fleet VR, 2019
- Ghost Fleet, 2018
- Hudson River Stories
  - The Hudson, A River At Risk, 2014–2016
    - PCBs, A Toxic Legacy
    - A Pipeline Runs Through It
    - Anchors Away
    - Bomb Trains on the Hudson
    - The Long Shadow of Indian Point
    - A Bridge Over Troubled Waters
    - High Voltage / Dark Shadow
  - Hope on the Hudson, 2016–2018
    - Seeds of Hope
    - City on the Water
    - Restoring the Clearwater
    - Growing with the Grain
    - Source to Sea
    - Undamming the Hudson
    - Keeping Carbon
    - Farmscape Ecology
    - The Wonder of the Bobolink
- Sink or Swim, 2015
- Dear President Obama, 2014
- Paradise is There, 2014
- Dear Governor Brown, 2014
- After the Spill, 2014
- Antarctica 3D: On the Edge, 2014
- Dear Governor Cuomo, 2012
- SoLA: A Louisiana Water Story, 2010
- TERRA ANTARCTICA, 2009
- What Would Darwin Think? Man Versus Nature, 2008
- Sea Kayaking Adventures, National Geographic Channel, 2004–2007
  - Birthplace of the Winds: Sea Kayaking Alaska, 2006
  - The Lost Coast of Gabon: Sea Kayaking West Africa, 2006
  - Around Tasmania: Sea Kayaking Australia, 2006
  - Into the Altiplano Part 1: Sea Kayaking Argentina, Bolivia & Chile, 2006
  - Into the Altiplano Part 2: Sea Kayaking Argentina, Bolivia & Chile, 2006
  - Borderland: Sea Kayaking Croatia, 2006
  - A Slow Boat to Somewhere: Exploring French Polynesia, 2004
  - The Dangerous Archipelago: Sea Kayaking French Polynesia, 2004
- Descending the Dragon, National Geographic Explorer, 2002

== Lectures ==
- National Geographic Live!, Washington D.C. (2000, 2003, 2005, 2007, 2009, 2010, 2014, 2016, 2017)
- National Geographic Society "Quest for Adventure" Lecture (2008, 2004, 2002, 2001), Washington, D.C.
- Royal Geographical Society, London
- Harvard Traveler's Club
- Princeton University
- Yale University
- The Explorer's Club, New York City (2001, 2003, 2007, 2010, 2014, 2016, 2017, 2019)
- Commonwealth Club, San Francisco
- TEDxAlbany
- TEDxSchenectady
- Aspen Institute, Aspen, CO
- Channel Thirteen/WNET's Celebration of Teaching and Learning, New York
- American Museum of Natural History "Polar Weekend," New York
- Golden Gate Institute, San Francisco
- Adventures in Travel Expo (Seattle, Washington D.C., New York, Chicago)
- Wild & Scenic Environmental Film Festival, CA
- Santa Barbara Ocean Film Festival ("Best Television Series" award), Santa Barbara, CA
- Macy's, New York
- REI, Seattle, WA
- Norwegian Tourism Board
- Croatia Tourism Board
- Cigna Insurance Annual Meeting, New York
- Banff Mountain Film and Book Festival, Banff, Canada
- Telluride Mountain Film Festival, Telluride, CO
- San Francisco Ocean Film Festival, San Francisco
