= Soviet–Canadian 1988 Polar Bridge Expedition =

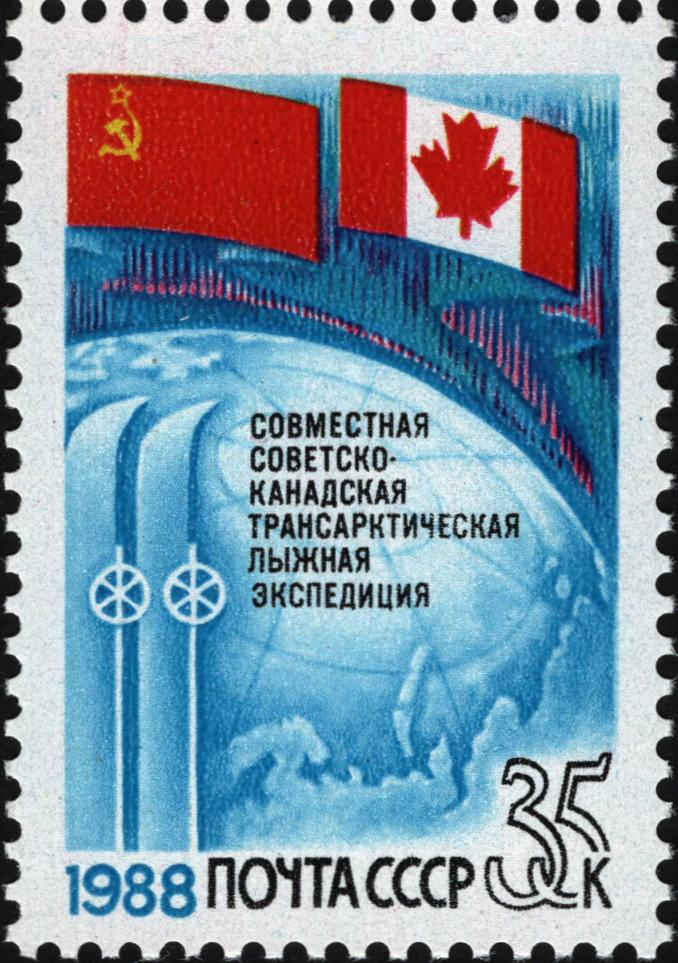
The Soviet Union stamp 1988

The Soviet–Canadian 1988 Polar Bridge Expedition (also known as Skitrek) began on March 3, 1988, when a group of thirteen Russian and Canadian skiers set out from Siberia, in an attempt to ski to Canada over the North Pole. The nine Russians and four Canadians reached the pole on 25 April and concluded their trek on Wednesday, June 1, 1988, when they reached Ward Hunt Island, Ellesmere, Northern Canada. At the North Pole, they were welcomed by a group of dignitaries from the Soviet Union and Canada, members of the international press, and radio amateurs involved in support and communications.

The daily progress of the skiers was followed by many thousands of school children and radio amateurs around the world. They listened to the voice synthesizer on board the UoSAT-OSCAR-11 satellite, which transmitted the latest known position of the expedition in FM on the two-meter VHF amateur radio band, using digitised voice; and to progress reports, produced regularly by AMSAT-NA, which were distributed worldwide through amateur packet radio and orbiting amateur radio satellites.

== Background ==
In the autumn of 1986, a group of Soviet scientists and radio amateurs made plans to ski to the South Pole, starting at the Antarctic coast. They intended to use amateur shortwave radio for all their communication with the outside world, especially the support stations in Moscow. However, it is not a good idea to rely on radio propagation conditions to the other side of the world, even with a support station on the Antarctic continent itself; so, in November, 1986, the University of Surrey (UoS) UoSAT centre was contacted to investigate the feasibility of using the UoSAT-OSCAR-11 satellite to relay information to the skiers.

Since UoSAT-2 (a.k.a. UO-11 or UoSAT-Oscar-11) is a Sun-synchronous polar orbiting satellite in a low Earth orbit, it passes over the poles every 98 minutes and a small handheld receiver with a simple whip aerial is sufficient to get a few minutes of excellent reception on each pass. By the end of 1987, while preparations were under way in the USSR, it was decided that the expedition would not take place at the South Pole, but instead at the North Pole; and the team would consist not only of Soviets, but a few experienced Canadian skiers as well. This time they would not only ski to the pole but continue their trek to Canada. The objective thus became to ski across the Arctic Ocean from the Siberian coast, via the North Pole, to the Canadian coast. The expedition started on March 3, 1988, and finished on June 1, when the skiers reached the small Ward Hunt Island just off Cape Columbia at Ellesmere Island, Northern Canada. The expedition was privately organized by 'Komsomolskaya Pravda', (the Soviet Youth Newspaper). Sponsors were the Soviet Youth Travel Agency 'Sputnik', and McDonald's restaurants of Canada. Canadian Project Manager was the Polar Bridge Company, a group organized by the Canadian skiers.

== Communications ==
All the necessary equipment for the 1,750 kilometres (1,090 mi) route was carried in rucksacks. No sledges, dogs or other transport vehicles were used, other than six airdrops of new supplies, carried out by Russian and Canadian planes. The Canadian and Russian skiers trained in both Canada and Siberia during the months prior to the expedition and also tried to learn to speak and understand each other's language. The main obstacles during the 95–100 days were open water, pressure ridges, thin ice, blizzards and very low temperatures, (-50 °C). They were medically examined before and after the expedition.

The Russian group consisted of: expedition leader and Arctic explorer Dmitry Shparo; photographer Alexander (Sasha) Belyayev, also in charge of meals; artist Fyodor Konyukhev; cameraman Vladimir Ledenev; physician Mikhail (Misha) Malakhov; radio operators Anatoli Melnikov and Vasili Shishkaryov; Anatoly Fedyakov who was responsible for equipment; and researcher Yuri Hmelevsky. The four Canadians were: navigator Richard Weber; radio operator Laurie Dexter; doctor Max Buxton; and scientist Chris Holloway. (See List of firsts in the Geographic North Pole).

Communications were handled via HF (shortwave) amateur radio between the skiers and support stations on and near the Arctic Ocean, and headquarters in Moscow and Ottawa. Special amateur radio call signs, CI8UA and EXOVE, were allocated for the expedition; and prefixes, CI8 and EX, for the support stations. The University of Surrey's orbiting space satellite UoSAT-OSCAR-11 was used to relay the position of the group, using the on-board Digitalker, (a computer speech synthesizer). At this time, before the advent of GPS, the position of the group was obtained by celestial measurements made by skiers themselves, and by using a beacon or Emergency Locator Transmitter (ELT) to send signals to be picked up by one of the COSPAS and SARSAT 'Search and Rescue' satellites when it flies overhead. Like the UoSAT satellite, they are in Low Earth Orbit (LEO), flying over the poles every 95–98 minutes. The position is calculated by command and tracking stations in Moscow and Canada, using the on-board stored date and time of the signal, and the measured Doppler effect, (a shift in frequency due to the relative velocity between the beacon and the satellite). The skiers could not do the translation to degrees longitude and latitude, because this would require special receivers and computers. Once processed, the data was sent directly to the skiers via shortwave amateur radio, (radio propagation conditions permitting), and by telex or shortwave radio (digital packet radio or voice) to the UoSAT command station at the University of Surrey in Guildford, Surrey, UK. There the information was subsequently loaded into the UoSAT-OSCAR-11 Digitalker. To listen to the satellite, the skiers carried ICOM u2AT handhelds, which were donated by ICOM and tested at very low temperatures, (-50 °C).

The shortwave radio equipment used by the expedition was a Soviet-made solid state 10 watt transceiver. It weighed 1.2 kilograms without batteries and had six fixed, crystal controlled frequencies for single-sideband (SSB) operation on the 80, 40 and 20 meter amateur radio bands. The 2 kg lithium battery provided the 2.2 amps at 12 V required to operate the transceiver for about a month, one hour per day, at low temperatures. The antenna for the system was an inverted-V with the mast made of five skis fitted together. The limited lifetime of the batteries was one of the reasons that there was generally no contact between radio 'Hams' and the skiers, other than with the support stations.

Uploads from the control station at the University of Surrey to the polar orbiting UoSAT satellite were delayed six to seven hours because the satellite only comes in range during two daily 'windows': two or three passes in the morning and two or three passes in the evening. The satellite flies over the North Pole every 98 minutes.

Each day around 1100 GMT the skiers rested for about eight hours and switched on their ELTs for about two hours. During this period the COSPAS/SARSAT satellites passed at least once. When the satellites came in range of their ground stations in Moscow or Ottawa, the information was downloaded and processed. The resulting position in degrees longitude and latitude was then passed on to the Ski-Trek amateur radio support stations.

The skiers got this information via the support stations in the USSR and Canada on their shortwave radio and by listening to the UoSAT-2 satellite. The support stations were manned and set up by amateur radio volunteers in remote areas, close to or on the Arctic Ocean at:

- Resolute Bay on Ellesmere Island, NWT, Canada (CI8C)
- Sredniy Island, a small Island in the Arctic Ocean near Severnaya Zemlia, Siberia (EX0KP)
- Soviet drifting ice island North-Pole 28, near the North-Pole (4K0DC and 4K0DX)
- Dikson Island, North Siberia, USSR (4K0DR)
- the University of Surrey 'Electronics And Radio Society' (ears) radio station in the UK () and UoSAT Control Station for UoSAT-OSCAR-11 communications

== Digitalker ==
One of the problems was composing, from a limited vocabulary, a proper DIGITALKER message for the expedition. The speech chips on board the satellite had about 500 words, some with an American accent, others with an English accent. The manufacturers actually used human voices which were digitised, not unlike the Compact Disc technique, but with fewer samples per second. Words such as NORTH, WEST, EAST, POSITION, LATITUDE, and LONGITUDE were not available, and new words could not be added. Fortunately, they did have DEGREE, TIME, and DATE.

The following message format was chosen, (with sample values):

 <Two warning tones>
 NUMBER 0
 PRIORITY 0 0 0
 DATE FIRST OF MARCH
 TIME 12 HOURS AND 0 MINUTES GMT
 YOU ARE AT 80 DEGREES 12 POINT 3 MINUTES N
 AND 90 DEGREES 87.6 MINUTES E
 73 FROM UOSAT

see here for an audio recording.

The number would increase for every new position report, (typically once per day). The priority was an emergency code, for when all communication with the skiers failed. Assuming they could still listen to UoSAT, it gave the possibility to acknowledge the last received message and indicate the action taken, like sending a plane or helicopter, if necessary. This feature was not needed. '73' is amateur radio speak, (originating from Morse code), for 'Greetings and Good Bye'.

This unprecedented hybrid link, involving ELTs, SARSAT/COSPAS, voice or telex and UoSAT-OSCAR-11 was known as NORDSKI COMM. It was the co-primary navigation tool for the skiers; celestial navigation was the other, more traditional, method.

== The Expedition ==
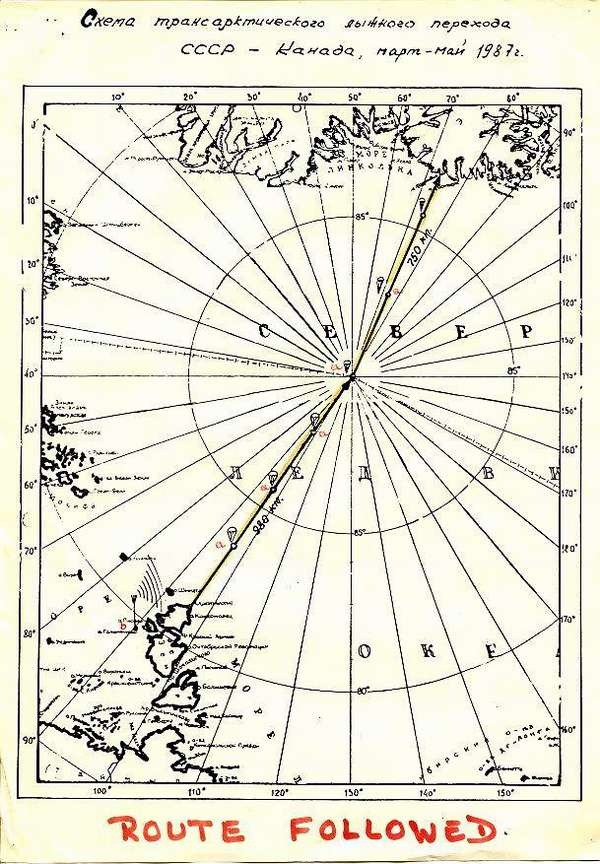
Route Followed

The start was delayed two days by bad weather preventing the airplane taking off for Sredniy. As the skiers set out, temperatures were around -47 °C with occasional blizzards. It was still polar night which would end at the start of spring, 23 May. Unexpectedly for those not familiar with Arctic regions, the skiers reported many leads of open water. They didn't use their single man boats, opting to try to go around the lead, or wait until the gap narrowed. The main cause of this open water phenomenon is the Transpolar Drift Stream, a major force in the ocean, which makes the ice break up and drift away, helped by the ever blowing wind. Even when the skiers rested for a few days, their position changed by several kilometres a day, usually in a northerly direction. The daily routine consisted of a steady 10- to 12-hour trek, followed by setting up their single twelve-man tent, switching on their ELT, having a meal of dried food, and spending a few minutes on the shortwave radio (80 m). A few hours later they again had a short contact on 80m to get the SARSAT/COSPAS information. When shortwave propagation failed, they had to wait until the UoSAT satellite was overhead and listen to the Digitalker. The morning routine included a quick breakfast and tent break-down. The skiers reported building igloos to dry clothing. Damp clothing froze as soon as they took it off. The main tent had the damp problem as well, but the temperature inside a properly built igloo can rise above 0 °C.

The first of 6 airdrops of supplies took place on March 14. Eleven parachute assisted drops were made in two passes over the skiers with an Antonov AN-74 Soviet plane, specially designed for this type of expedition work. Later, after they passed the North Pole, the Canadian side took over responsibility for the airdrops. Supplies included food and batteries, and, on one occasion, replacement skis.

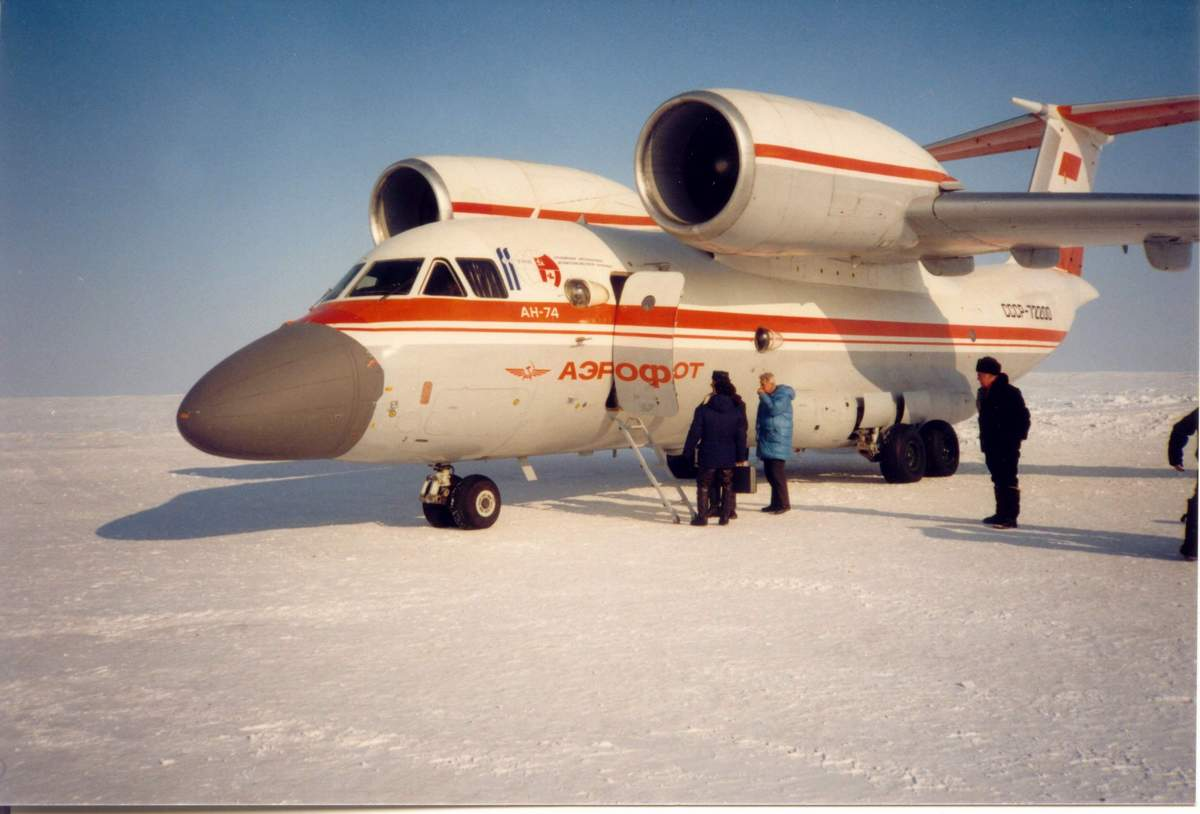
Antonov AN-74 parked at NP-28 drifting ice station

== The North Pole ==
The skiers reached the North Pole on April 26, and were welcomed by a group of journalists, officials (including energy minister Izraeli from the USSR and mining minister M. Masse from Canada), and radio amateurs involved in support and communications. All were flown in by helicopter from NP-28, the Soviet drifting ice station about 30 km from the North Pole, which contained an airstrip suitable for the Antonov AN-74, and Canadian Twin Otter and Hawker Siddeley HS748 airplanes. One airdrop, this time containing champagne and caviar, was made in front of the whole party.

(Part of) Speech by Canadian skier Laurie Dexter at the North Pole

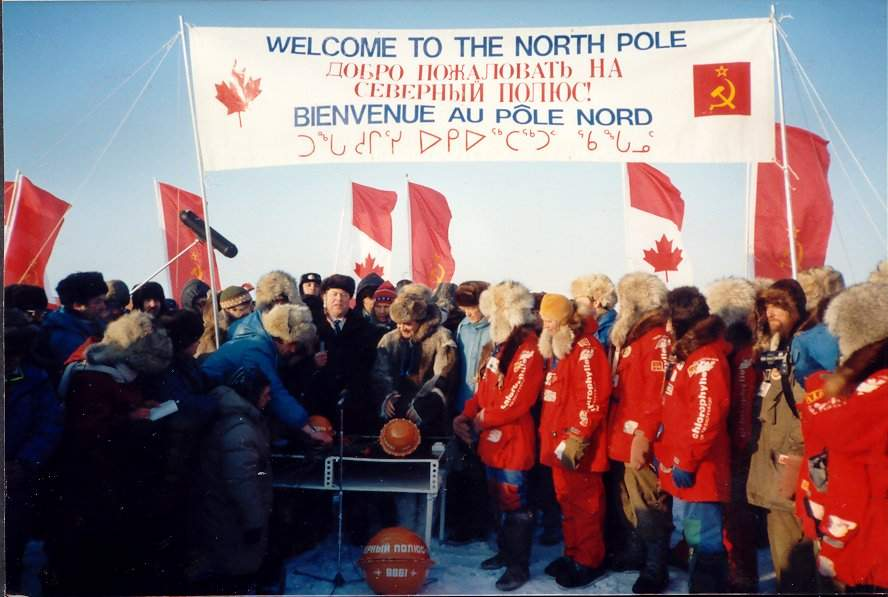
Welcome to the North Pole!

As the visitors were hurrying back home, the skiers started their 750 km trip to Ellesmere Island. Two more air drops were carried out, and they remained in good health and spirits.

The Transpolar Skitrek Expedition came to a successful conclusion on Wednesday, June 1, 1988, at 14:35 UTC as the 13 skiers stepped ashore on Ward Hunt Island just off the coast of Cape Columbia, Ellesmere Island.

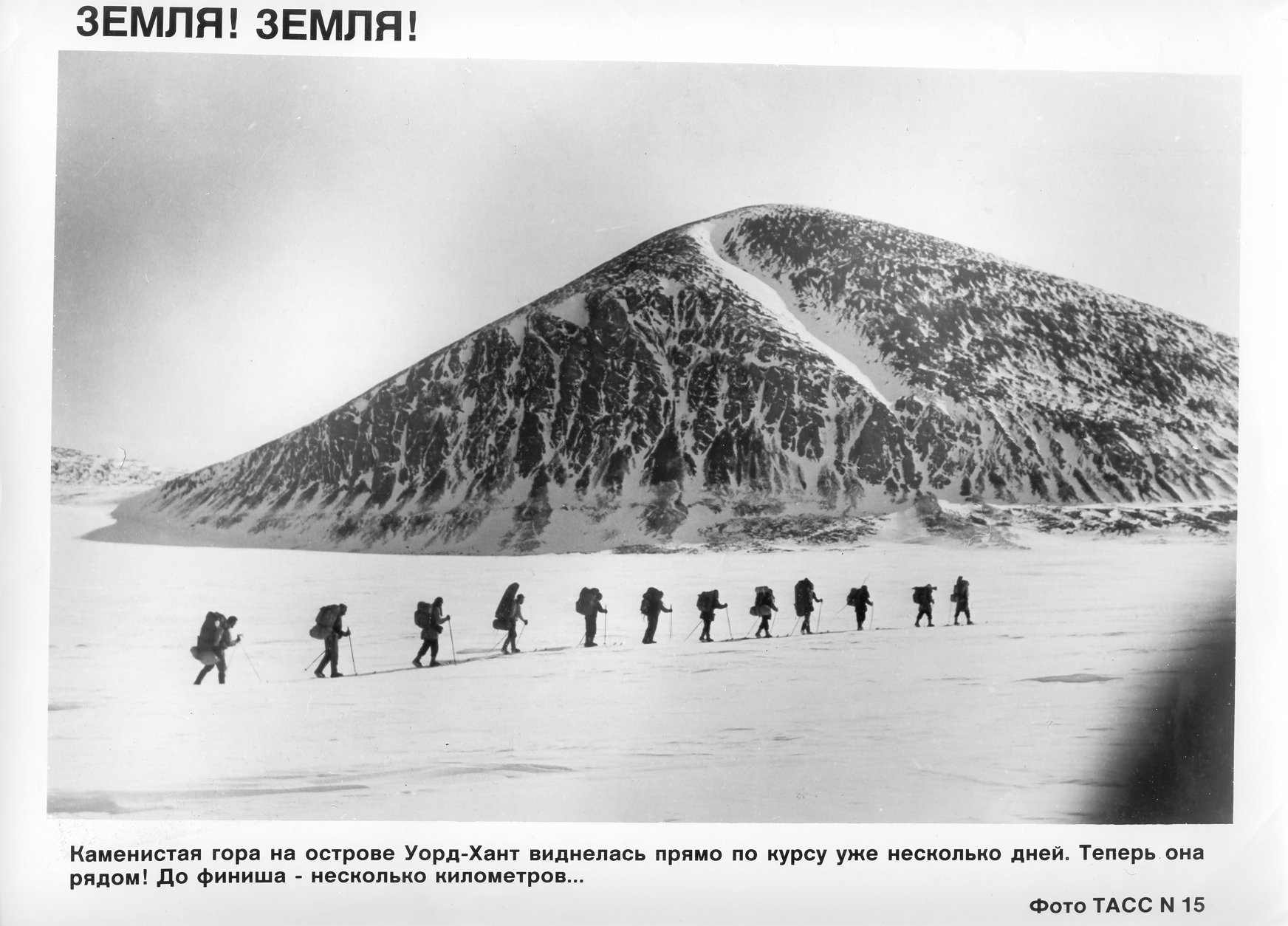
Land! land!

== Messages from the 'moving group' ==
(all sent by short wave amateur radio and digital packet-radio)

=== message 1, March 9, after one week "on the ice" ===
Frost bite scaring most faces. Toes and fingers permanently numb
and painful even when warm. A skier has blisters on his feet and
is taking medication for them. We have been making good distance
with only one lead blocking us for 1/2-day. Moisture is a big
problem in tent, clothing and boots. No chance of drying clothes
that are not being worn as they freeze instantly when taken off.
Richard (Weber) and Christopher (Holloway) have slept outside
every night to avoid condensation from the tent with the
success of perfect igloo building skills. Three pairs of
Russian skis broken and we will replace them with Canadian.
We have received telegrams from (Secretary) Gorbachev and
(Prime Minister) Mulroney wishing success. With our 90km
behind us we press on with good steerage and look forward to
longer days and warmer weather.

=== message 2, April 17, from Maxwell Buxton ===
"We have been on the ice 45 days now and are ready to begin our final
assault on the Pole. The journey has been divided into two week
stages Every stage has had its unique problems and solutions, but
as we progress I think we all feel that things are getting better. The
weather has warmed from a bone chilling -48 degrees Celsius to the
present balmy -25 degrees. Many of our initial injuries attributable
to cold and inexperience are resolving and we are learning to live and
work together more efficiently as a travelling group. For example, in
our first thirteen day stage, we covered 215 km. Stage two saw 236 km
passed and our recent thirteen days of skiing reduced the distance by
313 km. On the map our efficiency improved. In our tents and in our
minds the mood has shifted from apprehension, somber eternalization
and concern with survival to optimization, conviviality and a sense of
accomplishment. Almost 1000 km remain before our goal is realized, but
with the Pole just over 200 km away we are feeling spunkier than at
any point to date. The upcoming ceremonies at the Pole, which will
bring us in direct contact with the outside world for the first time
since our departure, present an exciting focus for our attention. This
is the largest expedition ever to reach the Pole and the one hundred
days required for the complete crossing is a long time to spend on the
ice. In every respect, these startling adventures represent the tip of
the iceberg. The magnitude of the project is considerable and its
success and completion depends on the work of many people on both
sides of the Arctic Sea. For the Canadian members of the trip now
presents (an opportunity for thoughts) of home, our families and
friends. For all of us we have, in fact, reaffirmed our love for them
and for the homeland."

=== A message from all four Canadian skiers ===
"We have found peanut butter to be one of the Arctic's best travelling
foods. We receive it in frozen lumps of 100 grams. The plan was
originally for 50 grams per man per day but it is so popular we are
increasing it to 100 grams daily. The Soviets were unfamiliar with
peanut butter and, at first, somewhat suspicious, but have taken to it
with vigour. Peanut butter supplies a good balance of carbohydrates
and fats, supplying both quick and long term energy. It is also a
tasty treat, something to look forward to during our ten hour skiing
day. P.S. At -40 degrees Celsius peanut butter does not stick to the
roof of your mouth."

== Progress reports ==
Daily reports were made by the team to communications support stations on Sredniy Island, USSR, Russian ice station North Pole 28 and Resolute Bay, Canada via amateur radio. These reports were relayed south at 1500z in the 20m amateur radio band on 14.121mHz USB. Reports were automatically taped and reduced to daily information notes for continuing logs.

DAY/TIM UTC   LATITUDE   LONGITUDE    REMARKS                             PROGRESS        
========   ===
===  ==========   ==================================  ========
03Mar 07:31   81d15.0mN   95d50.0mE   Starting point on Cape Arktichesky  
03Mar 11:24   81d21.2mN   96d12.8mE                                            7km 
04Mar 11:13   81d32.3mN   97d 0.0mE   -28dC                                   20km
05Mar 12:44   81d35.8mN   96d52.4mE   -21dC Snow wind 33meters/sec            14km
06Mar    No significant progress - Open water – Very windy - camped early      0km
07Mar 12:23   81d56.6mN   97d15.1mE                                           17km
08Mar  No position report                                                     20km
09Mar 12:30   82d09.3mN   97d47.0mE   -30dC                                   12km
10MAR 11:58   82d16.9mN   97d24.6mE   -45dC                                   20km
11Mar 11:36   82d28.8mN   97d13.0mE                                 
12Mar  No position report                                                     25km
13Mar 11:16   82d52.2mN   97d19.8mE   -42dC wind 3-4meters/sec                24km
14Mar                                <1st air drop successful on 14MAR >
15Mar 13:00   82d58.7mN   97d28.9mE   <Team built igloo and stayed till >  
16Mar                                <17Mar for R&R and experiment >          
17Mar 13:00   83d11.7mN   97d26.6mE   -35dC SE wind 3-5meters/sec             24km
18Mar 13:00   83d37.9mN   97d21.7mE   -31dC no wind or open water good cond   22km
20Mar 11:40   83d51.8mN   97d27.4mE   -36dC wind 1-2mps good ice & spirits    26km
21Mar 13:00   84d03.5mN   97d40.4mE   -39dC ice excellent few leads&hummocks  21km
22Mar 13:02   84d19.0mN   97d02.9mE   Everything good ice, temp, progress     28km
23Mar 13:00   84d28.9mN   96d12.4mE   -33dC Strong head winds 20-40km/hr      15km
24Mar 13:00   84d25.6mN   95d58.2mE   -37dC wind 40km/hr snowstorm             0km
25Mar  No position report    
26Mar 12:15   84d43.1mN   95d50.5mE   -42dC Clear wind NW 2-3mps 2days prog 32.4km
27Mar 10:48   85d00.1mN   95d31.5mE   -45dC clear wind light good ice         31km
28Mar 10:26   85d07.1mN   95d17.4mE   -38dC Open water a problem              12km
29Mar 11:38   85d18.9mN   94d55.3mE   -35dC 2nd air drop a success - stopped  24km
30Mar No change                      <Stopped at drop point for R&R >  
31Mar No change                      <and experiments> 
01Apr 11:12   85d23.2mN   93d40.0mE   -37dC Slept in before starting           8km
02Apr  No position report  
03Apr 11:49   85d48.8mN   92d20.5mE   -36dC Everybody ok      
04Apr 10:39   86d00.7mN   91d44.5mE   -37dC                                   22km 
05Apr 11:01   86d12.4mN   92d07.2mE         421km to go to the pole           22km
06Apr 10:57   86d26.3mN   93d18.3mE   -40dC Lots of ice  everybody ok         27km
07Apr 10:08   86d40.6mN   92d38.6mE   -28dC 600km total  369km to the pole    26km
08Apr 11:55   87d00.2mN   91d03.5mE   -28dC Best single day progress          37km
09Apr 10:38   87d14.2mN   91d48.4mE    
10Apr 11:37   87d32.6mN   93d29.5mE   -30dC 272km to the pole  everything ok  34km
11Apr 12:06   87d42.4mN   94d55.7mE   -30dC Estimating pole April 24-26       18km
12Apr 10:49   88d02.7mN   95d34.9mE   -30dC 235km to pole                     37km
13Apr 10:42   88d10.4mN   96d45.2mE         Start of trek before air drop     15km
13Apr         88d11.4mN   97d07.0mE         Air drop coordinates             
14Apr 11:45   88d11.4mN   95d09.9mE         Movement due only to ice drift 
15Apr 10:35   88d10.7mN   91d48.2mE         Movement due only to ice drift
16Apr 10:30   88d08.9mN   90d44.6mE         Movement due only to ice drift
17Apr 11:00   88d20.3mN   91d28.9mE   -32dC 185km to pole                     25km
18Apr 11:10   88d33.9mN   91d47.9mE   -30dC                                   27km
19Apr 11:58   88d45.8mN   94d31.6mE   -35dC 140km to pole                     27km
20Apr 11:05   89d00.0mN   95d42.8mE   -30dC Now estimating pole on 25Apr      25km
21Apr 11:33   89d11.9mN   89d20.6mE   -22dC Wind NE 43kts bad conditions      20km
22Apr 12:39   89d21.2mN   80d26.2mE   -20dC 64km to pole                      21km
23Apr         89d30.9mN   87d54.9mE   -20dC 46km to pole  ETA 25Apr           18km
24Apr 11:13   89d46.4mN  107d25.7mE   -25dC 24km to the pole                  28km
25Apr 10:12   89d56.6mN  147d18.8mE         6km to pole                       22km
26Apr 16:00   90d00.0mN                    The North Pole  
27Apr         90d00.0mN                    Official Canadian/Russian meeting  
28Apr 11:21   89d51.1mN  109d53.9mW  
29Apr 10:30   89d48.2mN  106d55.0mW  
30Apr 10:32   89d37.9mN   94d29.8mW   
01May 11:49   89d18.6mN   90d17.4mW   -10dC wind 25km/h vis 4km light snow    36km
02May 11:29   89d05.6mN   86d03.0mW   
03May 11:58   88d46.6mN   81d41.8mW   
04May 10:15   88d31.7mN   81d07.3mW   -5dC  Open water could become a prob    28km
05May 11:41   88d14.4mN   81d13.6mW   
06May  No position report                          
07May 11:54   87d43.5mN   81d31.5mW   
08May 10:48   87d25.4mN   81d13.9mW   
09May    No report available  
10May 11:36   86d56.6mN   79d20.3mW  
11May 10:28   86d44.7mN   77d32.1mW        Approximately 358km from pole      22km
12May 12:12   86d39.7mN   75d38.6mW        Approximately 400km from finish    10km
13May  No movement   stopped for resupply aircraft - 1st attempt failed  
14May 11:47   86d37.5mN   75d19.9mW   Resupply successful - Drift movement only   
15May 10:37   86d36.0mN   75d39.2mW   Drift movement only   
16May 11:02   86d37.3mN   75d48.4mW   Drift movement only  
17May 11:00   86d21.3mN   76d29  mW   Trek now underway again  
18May 10:17   86d06.4mN   77d25.1mW     
19May 11:37   85d56.1mN   77d06.4mW   -11dC 300km remaining                   20km
20May 10:44   85d41.7mN   76d54.8mW   -9dC  273km remaining to go             27km
21May 11:42   85d28.2mN   77d09.5mW   -10dC                                   24km
22May 10:22   85d15.8mN   77d04.9mW   -8dC  Rough ice-problem with lead       24km
23May 10:12   84d59.4mN   77d19.2mW   -7dC  Lots of water on ice 197km to go  28km
24May 13:48   84d40.2mN   75d47.4mW         Wind north 30km/h  good ice       35km
25May 11:50   84d28.2mN   75d31.5mW   -7dC  Planning for big lead near land   22km
26May 11:20   84d16.3mN   75d17.2mW   -6dC  Rough ice but a little sun        22km
27May 11:09   84d00.4mN   74d35.2mW   -6dC  Rough ice and foggy 99.9km to go  22km
28May 11:34   83d47.8mN   74d40.2mW   -6dC  Very rough ice                    23km 
29May 10:48   83d33.6mN   74d27.3mW   -6dC  Good ice  light wind              26km
30May 10:58   83d24.7mN   74d39.0mW   -14dC Very rough going  very windy      10km 
31May 10:25   83d12.9mN   74d18.8mW   -10dC Skiers still moving  21km to go   21km
01Jun 11:39   83d06.8mN   74d39.2mW   Moving after 1-hour rest                18km 
01Jun 14:35    The TREK is complete at Ward Hunt Island
