= Børge Ousland =

Norwegian polar explorer, photographer and writer

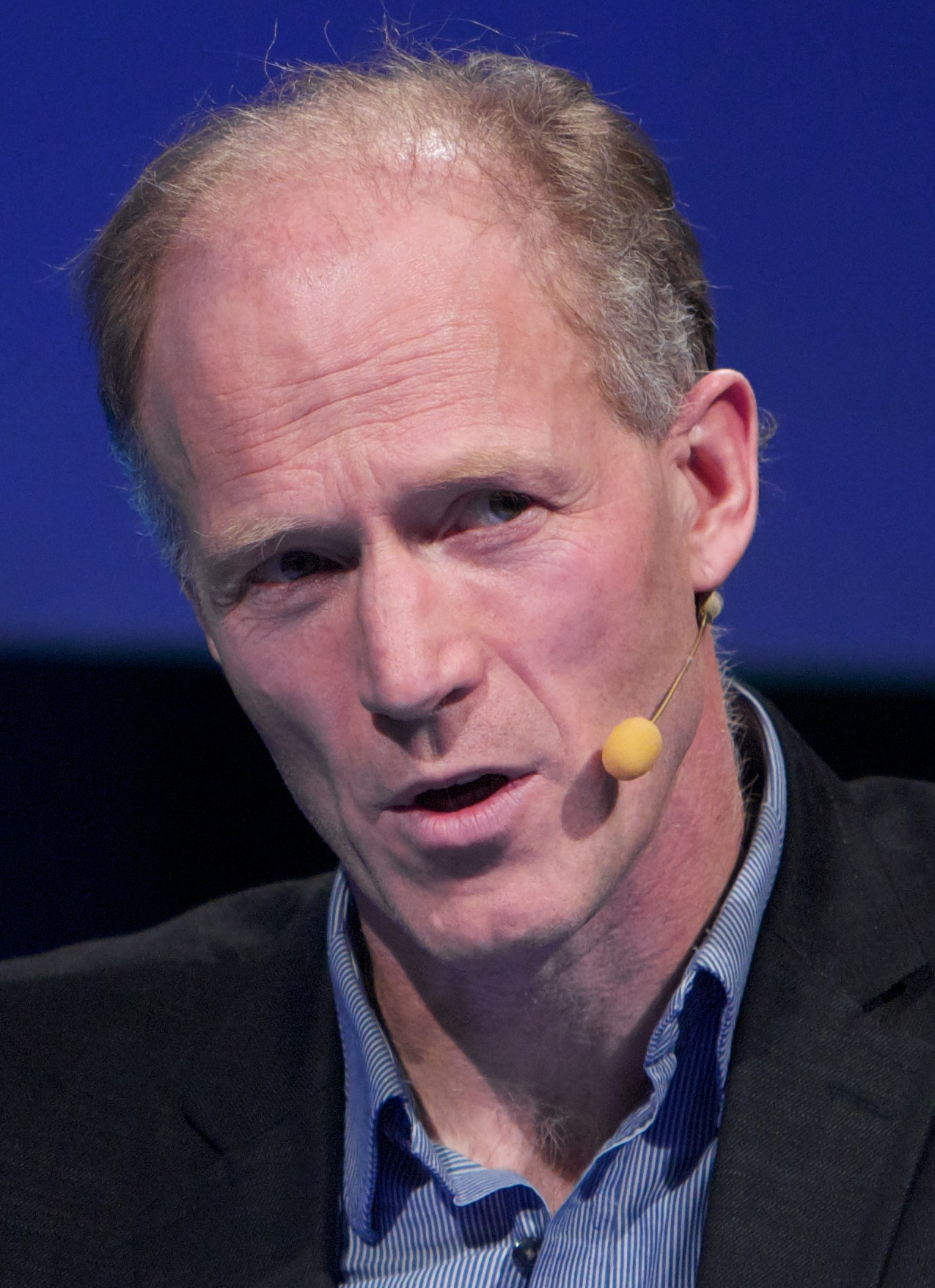

Personal information
- Nationality: Norwegian
- Born: Børge Michael Jangaard Ousland; 31 May 1962 (age 64) Oslo, Norway
- Occupations: Explorer, marinejeger (former), saturation diver
- Years active: 1986–present

Børge Ousland (born 31 May 1962) is a Norwegian polar explorer. He was the first person to cross Antarctica solo.

He started his career as a Norwegian Navy Special Forces Officer with Marinejegerkommandoen, and he also spent several years working as a deep sea diver for the oil industry in the North Sea.

On 4 May 1990 Ousland and Erling Kagge became the first explorers ever to reach the North Pole unsupported, after a 58-day ski trek from Ellesmere Island in Canada, a distance of 800 km.

In 1994, he made the first solo and unsupported journey to the North Pole from Arctic Cape in Russia.

Between 15 November 1996 and 17 January 1997, he became the first in the world to do an unsupported solo crossing of the Antarctic: 1,864 miles from the edge of the Ronne Ice Shelf to the edge of the Ross Ice Shelf. The ski journey was made with kite assistance, and also holds the record for the fastest unsupported journey to the South Pole, taking just 34 days.

On 22 January 2006, together with Mike Horn he began a journey to the North Pole in full Arctic night, successfully concluded on 23 March.

In September 2010, Ousland's team aboard the trimaran sailboat The Northern Passage completed the circumnavigation of the North Pole. A Russian team aboard the Peter I achieved the same feat in that season. These were the first recorded instances of the circumnavigation of the North Pole without an icebreaker. In December 2011 he traversed Antarctica to the South Pole for the centennial celebration of the first expedition to reach the Pole.

Ousland married at the North Pole in 2012 having been flown in by helicopter with "20 or 30 people".
