= Josée Auclair =

Canadian explorer

Josée Auclair (born May 20, 1962 in Sherbrooke, Quebec) is a Canadian explorer.

She lives with her husband Richard Weber and their two sons, Tessum and Nansen, in the Outaouais region of Quebec, Canada. Josée started cross-country skiing at the age of ten and began competing at fourteen. She was a member of Canada's National Cross Country Ski Team and represented Canada at international championships, mostly in Sweden and Germany. Between 1979 and 1982, she won four national titles in 5 km and 7.5 km competitions and, during her years at the University of Vermont, was a member of the relay team which won many honours.

On five occasions between 1999 and 2004, Josée skied to the North Pole as part of the "last degree expeditions" organised by Canadian Arctic Holidays, the Arctic expeditions and adventure company she operates with her husband. She acted as the assistant-guide on four of these expeditions but in April 2001 she became expedition leader of the very first all-women team to ski to the North Pole from a Russian base. In 2006, Josée was back in the expedition leader role for a group of 9 people heading from the North Pole to Ward Hunt Island at the northern tip of Ellesmere Island, Nunavut Canada. On April 27, the group managed to reach latitude 88 50′. However, bad ice conditions endangered their safety and they had to be evacuated and brought back to the Borneo drifting station. In January 2007, Josée set foot in Antarctica for the very first time as a team of four women called upon her to be their expedition leader for a last degree expedition to the South Pole. She is therefore the first Canadian woman to have guided expeditions at both poles.

Josée has traveled extensively in the Arctic since 1988 and has assisted her husband Richard and his partner Mikhail (Misha) Malakhov on several of their expeditions. She has actively participated in preparing and outfitting four major expeditions to the North Pole. Richard and Josée have over 20 years of experience and more than 45 Arctic expeditions to their credit (13+ of them to the North Pole). They are very well known across the Canadian Arctic, particularly in Nunavut. They are leaders in tourism and specialists in North Pole and northern logistics.

The Weber-Auclair family also operates Arctic Watch, Canada's most northerly lodge located in Cunningham Inlet on Somerset Island in Nunavut.

== Degrees ==
- Bachelor's degree in botany from the University of Vermont
- Teaching certificate from the Université du Québec

== North Pole expeditions ==
Year	Description
1999	Commercial "last degree" North Pole expedition from Russia. Assistant guide with Richard Weber.
2000	Commercial "last degree" North Pole expedition from Russia. Assistant guide with Richard Weber.
2001	Commercial "last degree" North Pole expedition from Russia. Guided a team of 10 women to the Pole. Most women had no previous Arctic experience.
2003	Commercial "last degree" North Pole expedition from Svalbard. Assistant guide with Richard Weber.
2004	Commercial "last degree" North Pole expedition from Svalbard. Assistant guide with Richard Weber.
2006	Guided a group of 6 clients with an assistant guide, from the North Pole to 88° 50’.

== South Pole expedition ==
Year	Description
2007	Expedition leader for a group of four women who skied from latitude 89°32′S to 90 S from January 20 to January 25, 2007.

== Other Arctic expeditions ==
Location	Year	Description
Baffin Island	1987	Dog sled and ski expedition from Broughton Island to Clyde River - 400 km (250 mi)
	1988	Pioneered a new route from Okoa Bay to Glacier Lake across the Penny Ice Cap, Auyuittuq National Park - 150 km (93 mi)
	1989	Sea kayaking and film making in the Pond Inlet region
	1990	Hiking south east of the community of Pond Inlet
	1996	Camping, hiking in the region of Milne Inlet, north Baffin Island. Sea kayaking in the Gold Cove area.
	1997	Spent two months with an Inuit family at an outpost camp in Gold Cove.
	1998	Established a tourist camp in Jackman Sound for hiking, kayaking, wildlife viewing and a kayak expedition around southern tip of Frobisher Bay
Ellesmere Island	1997	Ski expedition from Lake Hazen to Ward Hunt Island -250 km (160 mi). Climbed Arrowhead Mountain, 1,860 m (6,100 ft) (first summited by Dr. JR Weber in 1956)
	1998	Ski expedition from Ellesmere Island across the Kane Basin to Siorapaluk, Greenland - 300 km (190 mi)

== Awards ==
Year	Description
1983	Was awarded a "sportive distinction certificate" from the Université de Sherbrooke for her participation in cross-country skiing at the Canada Games.
1986	Was awarded a varsity letter from the University of Vermont for her participation and excellence in cross-country skiing.
1986	Was awarded the All East Ski Team Award by the Eastern Intercollegiate Ski Association for her outstanding performances in cross-country skiing.

== See also ==
- List of female sportspeople
- List of polar explorers
