= Liv Arnesen =

Norwegian cross-country skier

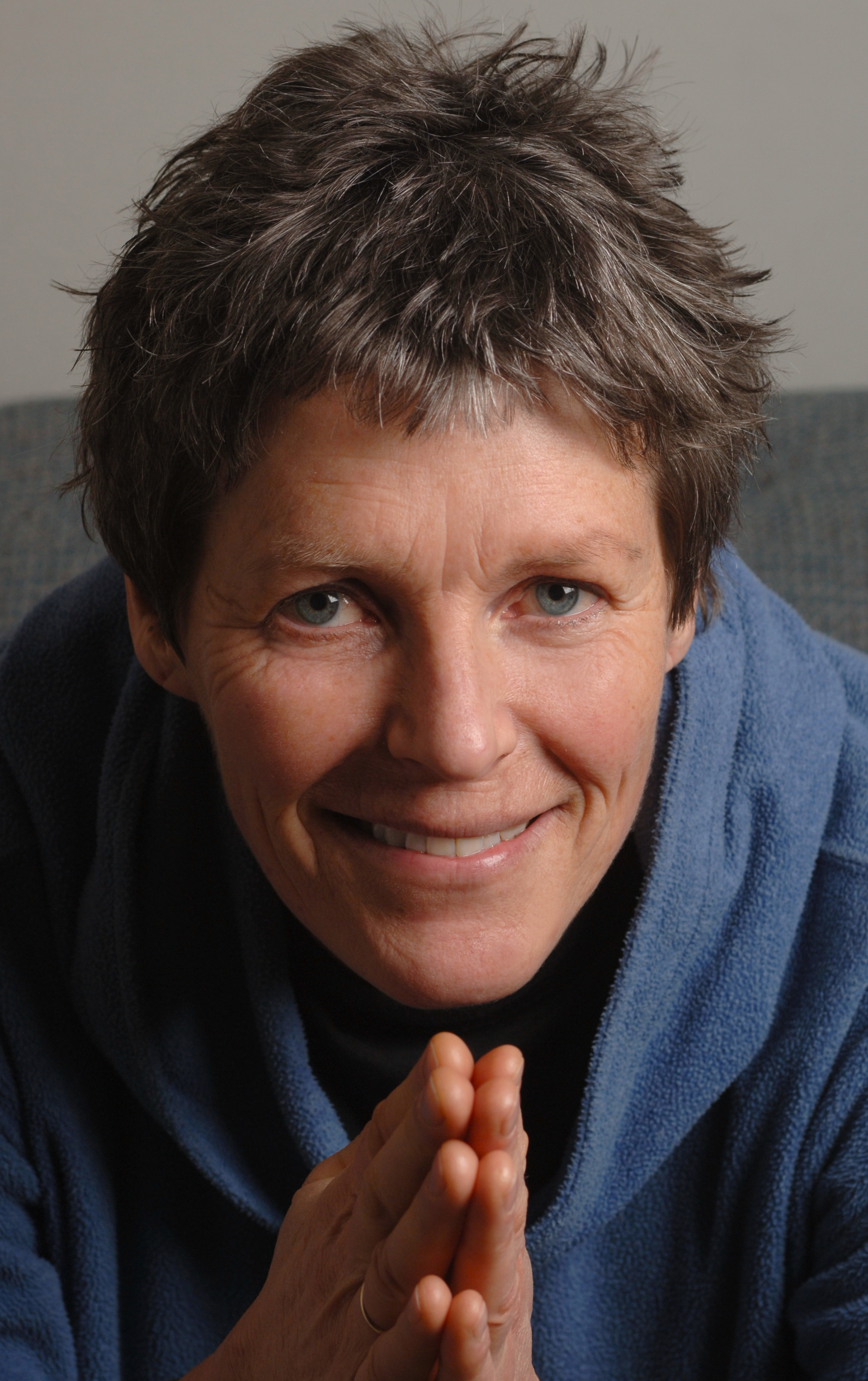
- Born: Liv Ragnheim Arnesen; June 1, 1953 (age 71); Bærum, Akershus, Norway
- Occupations: Educator; explorer; lecturer
- Known for: First female to ski solo and unassisted to the South Pole (1994)
- Website: www.livarnesen.com

Liv Ragnheim Arnesen (born June 1, 1953) is a Norwegian educator, cross-country skier, adventurer, guide, and motivational speaker. Arnesen led the first unsupported women’s crossing of the Greenland Ice Cap in 1992. In 1994, she made international headlines becoming the first woman in the world to ski solo and unsupported to the South Pole. – a 50-day expedition of 745 miles (1,200 km).

== Early life ==
Arnesen grew up in Bærum, Norway on the outskirts of Oslo where at an early age, her parents immersed her in their passions: cross-country skiing and polar history. At an early age, Arnesen acquired her taste for the great wide open spaces while spending winters and Easter holidays in the Norwegian mountains. Her love of athletics and the outdoors eventually led Arnesen to compete in orienteering and cross-country skiing, as well as to coach high school students in advanced-level cross-country skiing. At the age of 9, Liv read about Roald Amundsen’s expedition to the South Pole.

== Expeditions ==
=== Greenland 1992 ===
In 1992, Liv took part in a team which became the first all-woman team to make an unsupported crossing of the Greenland icecap.

=== South Pole 1994 ===
In her book Good Girls do not Ski to the South Pole, Liv details her first solo-encounter with the Antarctic. Without support, Liv skied 745 miles and reached the South Pole in 50 days.

=== Mount Everest, North Ridge 1996 ===
In 1996, Arnesen attempted to reach the top of Mount Everest but had to retreat as she developed incipient high altitude cerebral edema.

=== Antarctica 2001 ===
Arnesen and American polar explorer Ann Bancroft become the first women in history to sail and ski across Antarctica’s landmass — completing a 94-day, 1,717-mile (2,747 km) trek.

=== Arctic Ocean 2005 ===
In 2005, following 2 years of preparation, Arnesen and Bancroft embarked on an attempt to make history as the first women to ski across the Arctic Ocean. Due to bureaucracy, all Arctic expeditions of 2005 were forced to evacuate the Arctic Ocean and forgo their efforts.

=== Arctic Ocean 2007 ===
On March 12, the BAE team was forced to abandon Arctic Ocean 2007, a 530-mile (853-kilometer) unsupported trek to the North Pole. Bancroft and Arnesen hoped to use their expedition to teach children around the world about climate change, but spring temperatures stymied the effort.

=== Proposed South Pole expedition ===
In 2010, Arnesen and Bancroft were planning an international expedition of women to the South Pole. One of the goals of the expedition was to reach the global audience of millions of schoolchildren, already following their exploits thanks to past expeditions, with insight and awareness about the freshwater crisis.

== Motivational speaker ==
Arnesen is a motivational speaker for corporations, schools, and non-profit organizations.

== Awards ==
- Women of Discovery Courage Award - 2008 - WINGS
- “Women of the Year”, 2001 by Glamour (magazine)
- “Trailblazer”, 2001 by Scandinavian-American Hall of Fame
- “Achievement Award”, 2001 by the Norwegian-American Chamber of Commerce
- "Diploma of Honor", 1999 by The Russian Geographic Society
- In 2004, Arnesen signed the American Geographical Society's Flier's and Explorer's Globe.

== Other information ==
- Liv Arnesen co-owns an exploration company, with Ann Bancroft.
- Arnesen is an atheist.
- Liv is a former ambassador to the Norwegian Refugee Council.
