= Mike Horn =

South African-Swiss explorer

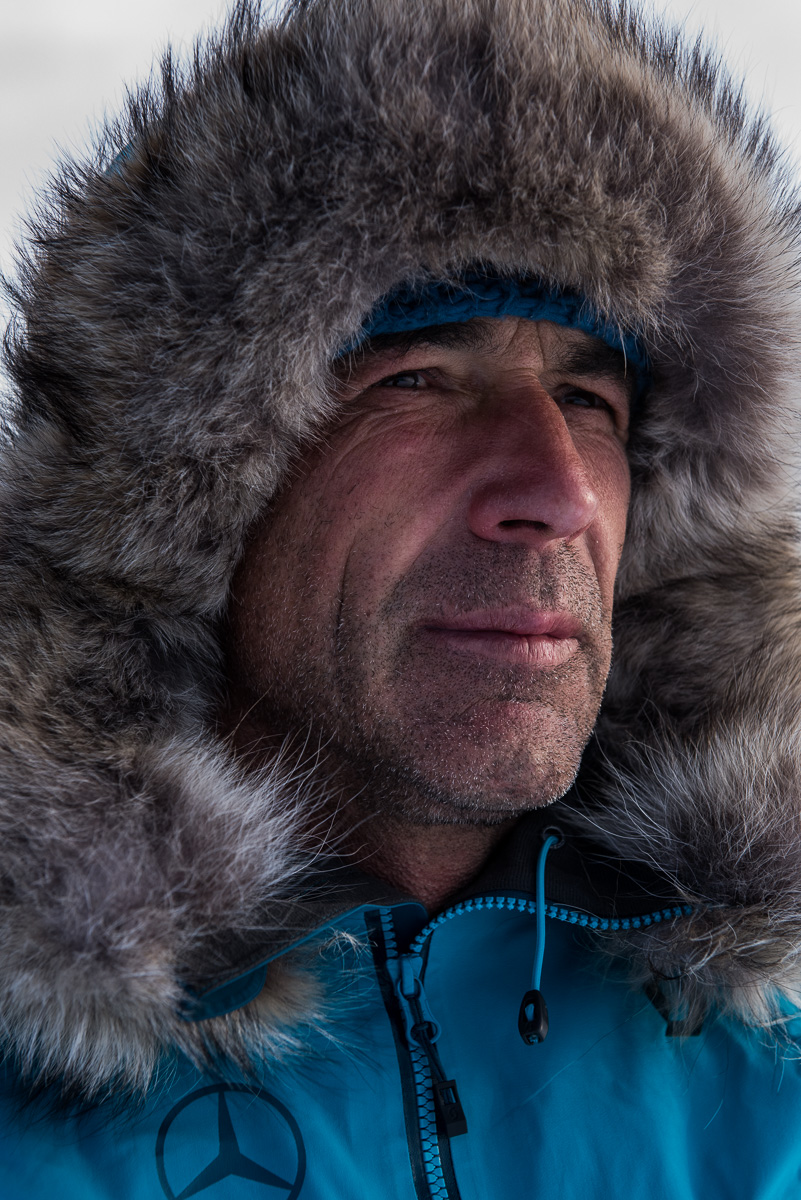
- 2016
- Born: 16 July 1966 (age 60); Johannesburg, South Africa
- Occupations: explorer, motivational speaker
- Known for: Completing a solo journey around the equator without motorised transport
- Website: mikehorn.com

Michael Horn (born 16 July 1966) is a South African–born Swiss professional explorer and adventurer. Born in Johannesburg, South Africa, he currently resides in Château d'Œx, Switzerland. He studied Human Movement Science at Stellenbosch University in Western Cape, South Africa.

Mike Horn became famous in 2001 after completing a one-year, 6-month solo journey around the equator without any motorised transport. In 2004 he completed a two-year, 3-month solo circumnavigation of the Arctic Circle, and in 2006, along with the Norwegian explorer Børge Ousland, became the first men to travel without a dog or motorised transport to the North Pole during winter, in permanent darkness.

== Biography ==
Mike was born in Johannesburg, South Africa. He spent most of his childhood outdoors climbing trees, cycling for miles and fishing with his three brothers and sisters. Both his parents were university teachers, and his father was also a successful amateur rugby player.

Mike said that he learned to challenge himself from a young age, but it was the army that taught him about survival. "I hate war but I think it prepared me for what I do today," he said, remembering his days in the military service when he was sent to Angola and first witnessed death. "I was only an 18-year-old kid when I discovered one will do anything to stay alive".

He studied Human Movement Science at the University of Stellenbosch in Western Cape, South Africa.

Mike says he first felt the call of the wild at 24 years old. He quit his comfortable sports science job, gave everything away and moved to Switzerland. From there, he embarked on a series of adventures, including descending by delta plane from a 22,000-foot mountain and riverboarding the world's deepest canyon.

Mike was married to Cathy Horn. She died in February 2015 due to breast cancer. He has two daughters, Jessica and Annika who work for him.

== Motivational coaching ==
Horn uses his experiences to motivate sportsmen and other people involved in challenging work such as deep-sea drilling. During 2010 and 2011, he conducted motivational sessions for the Indian Cricket Team at the request of its coach, Gary Kirsten. The team went on to win the 2011 Cricket World Cup for the second time after 28 years. Members of the Indian Cricket Team acknowledged Horn's motivational work.

Horn then accompanied Kirsten and the South African cricket team, whom Kirsten then coached, on an expedition to the Alps in 2012, as a team-bonding exercise and part of their preparation for their Test series against the then No. 1 ranked team England. They dominated England in the first test (of a 3-test series), a feat which England and world cricket had not seen in a decade. Eventually, South Africa went on and won the series 2–0 with one test drawn. With this victory, South Africa took the No. 1 test ranking from England, and currently holds the mace. He was also hired by Kolkata Knight Riders team for IPL-7 and KKR won the first match with 41 Runs against Mumbai Indians and went on a 9 match unbeaten run eventually winning the IPL-7 Title. The latest in line to benefit from Horn's expertise was the German football team. The entire squad went on a sailing trip with Horn in June during their preparations for the World Cup and came out a rejuvenated side. German captain Philipp Lahm was impressed, saying it was "incredible what the human body can achieve." "We must be well prepared, and have to respect the opponent," said Lahm when asked what they had learned after Horn's presentation.

== Expeditions ==
=== Amazon (1997) ===
In April 1997, Mike launched his first big expedition: the six-month solo traverse of the South American continent. He left on foot from the Pacific Ocean and climbed to the source of the Amazon River high in the Peruvian Andes. From here he descended the 7,000 km of the Amazon River on a hydrospeed, until he reached the Atlantic Ocean. It took him six months, solo and without assistance.

Mike hunted, fished and survived off his environment. His finish point was the Atlantic Ocean where he finally tasted saltwater.

=== Latitude Zero (1999-2000) ===
In 1999, Mike set off on an 17-month voyage to circle the equator on foot and by sailing.

He left Gabon and crossed the Atlantic to Brazil on a Corsair F-28 trimaran. He then crossed Brazil and Ecuador on bike, canoe and on foot. After that he crossed the Pacific Ocean reaching Indonesia via the Galápagos Islands and crossed Borneo and Sumatra on foot, before crossing the Indian Ocean. To finish the expedition, he crossed the African continent on foot through the Congo and Gabon.

This was the first solo circumnavigation of the world around the Equator – unaided and with no engine-driven support.

=== Arktos (2002-2004) ===
In 2002–04, Mike went around the world on the Arctic Circle solo in an expedition dubbed "Arktos". It was a solitary voyage of two years and three months without motorised transport (boat, kayak, ski kite and on foot) on a 20,000 kilometres (12,000 mi) odyssey. Mike left North Cape in Norway and went through Greenland, Canada, Alaska, Bering Strait and Russian Siberia before he reached North Cape.

Mike spent time with the local people who had courageously adapted to the unforgiving environment.

In 2005 Mike published his account of this expedition in Conquérant de l'impossible (published in English in 2007 as Conquering the Impossible by St Martin's Press).

=== North Pole by Night (2006) ===
In a world first, Mike set off on a 60-day voyage on skis without dogs or motorised transportation during the Arctic night with Norwegian explorer Børge Ousland in 2006. From February to March, they dragged pulkas from Cape Artichesky in Russia to the North Pole. For two months the pair walked in total darkness, and often on paper-thin ice.

=== Pangaea (2008-2012) ===
In 2008, Mike and his team launched the Young Explorers Program. This program consisted of recruiting and then inviting young adults between the ages of 15 and 20 years old, from all over the world – to explore the Earth's continents and travel across the planet's oceans with the PANGAEA expedition-sailing vessel. Close to 100 Young Explorers accompanied him to 12 hot spots around the world where they implemented ecological and social projects – following the motto "explore – learn – act". Although this project ended in 2012, the Young Explorers – now young world ambassadors – continue to set in motion different types of projects around the globe.

=== Driven To Explore (2015) ===
In May 2015, Mike Horn set off on the "Driven To Explore" expedition, sponsored by Mercedes-Benz. Leaving from Switzerland, Horn drove through 13 countries, reaching Pakistan where he attempted to summit K2 (8611 m) in the Karakoram mountain range.

=== Pole2Pole (2016-2019) ===
In 2016, Horn set off on his latest expedition "Pole2Pole", a two-year circumnavigation of the globe via the South and North Poles. On 8 May 2016, Mike left from his point of departure, The Yacht Club of Monaco with the support of H.S.H Prince Albert of Monaco II. Sponsored by Mercedes-Benz and Panerai Mike's Pole2Pole adventure took him across land and sea. Equipped with his exploration sailing vessel, Pangaea, Mike circumnavigated the globe from Africa to Antarctica, Oceania, Asia, the Arctic, and back to Europe. The Pole2Pole expedition ended in December 2019 following the completion of Mike's Arctic crossing which brought him back to Europe, his starting point over three years after leaving the Yacht Club of Monaco in May 2016.

=== Antarctica Crossing (2016-2017) ===
On 7 February 2017, at 22:50 UT, Mike Horn completed the longest ever solo, unsupported north-to-south traverse of Antarctica from the Princess Astrid Coast (lat -70.1015 lon 9.8249) to the Dumont D'urville Station (lat -66.6833 lon 139.9167) via the South Pole. He arrived at the pole on 9 January 2017. A total distance of 5100 km was covered by utilising kites and skis in 57 days.

=== Arctic Crossing (2019) ===
On 7 December 2019, just before midnight, Mike Horn and Børge Ousland completed the first ever full crossing of the Arctic Ocean via the North Pole. The pair left from Nome, Alaska on 28 August 2019, on Mike Horn's exploration sailing vessel Pangaea captained by famous Swiss sailor Bernard Stamm and a small crew.

The goal was to sail as far north as possible towards the North Pole until solid ice prevented them from navigating any further. This position was reached on 11 September and would be Mike and Børge's departure point for their #NorthPoleCrossing expedition. (Coincidentally, Pangaea ended up being the furthest north a sailing vessel has ever ventured to.) The two explorers disembarked Pangaea and began their trek across the frozen Arctic Ocean on 12 September 2019, pulling two sledges each weighing over 180 kg.

Their journey lasted 87 days, 57 of which were spent in total darkness due to the winter season. The main difficulties faced during this adventure were the fragility of the ice due to the seasonal climate and strong negative drifts pushing the duo away from their goal. Due to these challenges and the significant delays they caused, Mike and Børge had to finish their expedition differently than originally anticipated. The initial plan was to be picked up by Mike's boat Pangaea on the Norwegian side, where the solid ice broke into the open water. However, due to food shortage, a larger boat capable of making its way further north into the ice was sent to pick up the two adventurers instead.

== Mountaineering ==
=== Gasherbrum 1 (8035 m) and Gasherbrum 2 (8068 m) ===
In 2007, Mike, Jean Troillet, Fred Roux and Olivier Roduit reached the summit of Gasherbrum 1 (8035 m) and Gasherbrum 2 (8068 m) without oxygen. The original plan was to climb four Himalayan summits of 8000 metres, but their luck turned with weather which made them turn back.

=== Broad Peak (8047 m) ===
In 2010, Mike and Swiss mountain guide/alpinist Köbi Reichen reach the summit of Broad Peak (8047 m) without the use of additional oxygen in the Karakoram mountain range in Pakistan.

=== Makalu (8463 m) ===
In 2014, Mike and Fred Roux summited the majestic peak of Makalu (8,463 m) in alpine style, without high altitude porters or the use of additional oxygen.

=== K2 (8611 m) ===
In May 2015, Mike Horn set off on the "Driven To Explore" expedition with the support of his main sponsor Mercedes-Benz. Leaving from Switzerland, Horn drove through 13 countries at the wheels of two Mercedes-Benz G-Class SUVs to finally reach Pakistan where he attempted to summit K2 (8611 m) in the Karakoram mountain range. Accompanied by his climbing partners, Fred Roux and Köbi Reichen, the team did not reach the summit due to unfavourable weather.

== Television shows ==
=== The Island: seuls au monde ===
Since 2015, Horn has been participating in M6's French television show "The Island: Seuls au monde" season 1, 2 and 3 as the show's survival expert, where he shares his deep knowledge of survival with the show's participants in order for them to survive on a tropical island without food or assistance over the period of one month.

=== À L'État Sauvage ===
Between 2016 and 2018, Horn participated in M6's French version of the American television show: Running Wild with Bear Grylls, named: À L'État Sauvage. In each episode, Horn brings a different celebrity along on his adventures. The following six French celebrities embarked on an adventure with Horn: Michael Youn, Matt Pokora, Laure Manaudou, Christophe Dechavanne, Shy'm and Adriana Karembeu. Each episode took place in different countries around the world: Namibia, Sri Lanka, Botswana, Venezuela and Nepal.

=== Cap Horn ===
After 6 episodes of "À L'État Sauvage", Horn starts his own format of the show: "Cap Horn". So far, two episodes of this new show have aired in 2018, featuring celebrities Arnaud Ducret and Bernard de La Villardière, whom he embarked on adventures with in the Philippines.

== Publications ==
Horn has published the following books with his publishing house XO Éditions:

- 2001 : Latitude zero
- 2005 : Conquering the Impossible
- 2005 : (in French) À l'école du Grand Nord
- 2007 : (in French) Objectif : Pôle Nord de nuit
- 2015 : (in French) Vouloir toucher les étoiles
- 2016 : (in French) Aventurier de l'Extrême (co-published with les Éditions du Chêne)
- 2017 : (in French) Libre! (co-published with les Éditions du Chêne)
- 2018 : (in French) Antarctique, Le rêve d'une vie
- 2021 : (in French) Survivant des glaces
