= Richard Weber (explorer) =

Canadian cross-country skier

Richard Weber, CM (born June 9, 1959, in Edmonton, Alberta) is a Canadian Arctic and polar adventurer. From 1978 to 2006, he organized and led more than 45 Arctic expeditions. Richard is the only person to have completed six full North Pole expeditions.

== Biography ==
Richard comes from a family of dedicated cross country skiers. He started skiing at the age of two and competing at six. He became a member of Canada's National Cross-Country Ski Team in 1977 and represented Canada in World Championships in 1977, 1979, 1982 and 1985. He retired from cross-country skiing in 1985 (with twenty national titles) and has since been dedicated to Polar and Arctic expeditions. Through the years, Richard has collected several firsts:

- In 1986, in the Will Steger International Polar Expedition, with teammates Paul Schurke, Geoff Carroll, Will Steger and Ann Bancroft and Brent Boddy. Along with this latter, he became the first Canadian to reach the North Pole on foot.
- In 1988, became the first person to reach the North Pole from both sides of the Arctic Ocean.
- In 1989, in the Soviet-Canadian Polar Bridge expedition, 1988, from Northern Siberia to Ellesmere Island National Park Reserve in Canada, he became the first person to accurately stand at the Geographic North Pole (first GPS to register "90" north).
- In 1992, in the Weber-Malakhov expedition, with companion Dr. Misha Malakhov, became the first attempt to reach the North Pole with no outside help.
- In 1995, Richard and Misha's expedition became the first unsupported expedition to reach the North Pole and return to land. The achievement has not yet been repeated.
- In 2006, in the 2006 North Pole Classic, with Conrad Dickinson, became the first to trek to the North Pole using snowshoes exclusively.
- In 2009, he completed an on-foot trek from Hercules Inlet on the Ronne Ice Shelf to the South Pole in a record time of 33 days, 23 hours and 30 minutes. He was accompanied by fellow Canadians Ray Zahab and Kevin Vallely.
- In 2010, he organized and completed an on-foot trek from northern Canada to the North Pole with his son Tessum Weber, and fellow adventurers David Pierce Jones and Howard Fairbank, they went on to set the fastest time to the North Pole (42 days, 18 hours 52 minutes for the 900 km trek).

Together with his wife, Josée Auclair, and their two sons, Tessum and Nansen, Richard operates Arctic Watch, Canada's most northerly lodge located in Cunningham Inlet on Somerset Island in Nunavut. Through their company, Canadian Arctic Holidays, they also outfit, organize, and lead Arctic expeditions and adventure trips, some of them to the Poles.

== Degrees ==
- Bachelor's degree in mechanical engineering from the University of Vermont

== Major North Pole expeditions ==
Year	Expedition Name	Description
1986	Will Steger International Polar Expedition	The first confirmed expedition to reach the North Pole without resupply. Team members who reached the Pole were: Will Steger, Paul Schurke, Brent Boddy, Geoff Carroll, Ann Bancroft and a team of 21 dogs. During this expedition, Richard, along with teammate Brent Boddy, became the first Canadians to reach the North Pole on foot while Ann Bancroft became the first woman to trek to the Pole.
1988	Soviet-Canadian Polar Bridge Expedition	The first surface crossing of the Arctic Ocean on skis. This 91-day expedition crossed 1800 kilometres of Arctic Ocean from Cap Arkticheskiy in Northern Siberia to Cape Columbia on Ellesmere Island (Canada), via the North Pole. The 13 members (nine Soviets and four Canadians) departed on March 3, reached the Pole on Day 54 (April 25) and arrived in Canada on June 1. Richard became the first person to reach the Pole from both sides of the Arctic Ocean: Canada and Russia.
1992	Weber Malakhov Expedition	Richard, with companion Misha Malakhov became the first to attempt to journey to the North Pole and return using only human resources. They departed from Ward Hunt on March 13. Eighty-five days later, on June 14, they reached 89 degrees 39. With only 39 kilometers short of the Pole, they had to make the decision to turn back if they wanted to have any hope of returning to Ward Hunt. On June 21, due to the lack of ice, they were picked up by an airplane and brought back to safety.
1995	Weber Malakhov Expedition	Richard and Misha's second attempt to journey from Ward Hunt (Canada) to the North Pole and return using only human resources was a success. Their expedition became the first (and is still the only) unsupported expedition to reach the North Pole and return to land. They departed Ward Hunt on February 14 and reached the Pole eighty one days later, on May 12. On June 15, they were back at Ward Hunt establishing a record of 108 days for the longest unsupported polar journey.
2006	North Pole Classic	Richard guided Conrad Dickinson to the North Pole with no re-supplies. This was the first expedition to reach the North Pole using snowshoes exclusively.
2007	North Pole Expedition 2007	Richard guided Adrian Hayes (from Dubai) and Iain Morpeth (from the United Kingdom) to the North Pole. They left Ward Hunt on March 7 and reached the Pole on April 25, on Day 50 of the expedition.

== "Last Degree" North Pole expeditions ==
In April 1993, Richard and Dr. Mikhail (Misha) Malakhov pioneered the first commercial North Pole expedition allowing people to ski the final 100 kilometres (i.e. from the 89th parallel) to the North Pole. From Longyearbyen (in the Svalbard archipelago), the clients are flown to Borneo, the Russian drifting station, the starting point of the expedition.

Between 1993 and 2005, Richard and Misha have conducted eight of these North Pole Dash expeditions.

In 1999, Jack MacKenzie, a North Pole Dash participant originating from Canada, became the oldest person ever to ski to the North Pole at age 77 years, ten months and 13 days.

On April 23, 2003 Jill and Pete Etheridge, and Alison Sheldrick, three of the North Pole Dash participants, became the first persons to reach the North Pole wearing snowshoes.

== Other arctic expeditions ==
Location	Year	Description
Alaska	1985	Dog sled and ski expedition - Inuvik to Point Barrow - training expedition for Will Steger International Polar Expedition - 850 km
Axel Heiberg Island, Nunavut	1999	Ski expedition from Expedition Fiord, across the island to mummified forest, and Muller Ice Cap -200 km
Arctic Ocean	2003	Training Search and Rescue Technicians (SARTechs) on the Arctic Ocean-based out of the Canadian military base in Alert, Ellesmere Island, Nunavut
Baffin Island	1987	Dog sled and ski expedition from Broughton Island to Clyde River - 400 km
	1988	Pioneered a new route from Okoa Bay to Glacier Lake across the Penny Ice Cap, Auyuittuq National Park - 150 km
	1991	Ski expedition Igloolik to Clyde River across Fox basin - 650 km
	1997	First commercial trip from Okoa Bay to Glacier Lake across the Penny Ice Cap, Auyuittuq National Park - 150 km
	1998	Established a tourist camp in Jackman Sound for hiking, kayaking, wildlife viewing + Kayak expedition around southern tip of Frobisher Bay
	1998 and 1999	Crossing of Penny Ice Cap, Auyuittuq National Park from Coronation Fiord to Glacier lake - 120 km
	2002	Ski expedition from Sam Ford Fiord, Clyde River to Pond Inlet - 550 km
	2003	Ski traverse of Bylot Island, north Baffin Island - 200 km
Ellesmere Island, Nunavut	1997	Ski expedition from Lake Hazen to Ward Hunt Island -250 km. Climbed Mount Arrowhead (first summited by Dr. JR Weber in 1956)
	1998	Ski expedition from Ellesmere Island across Kane Basin to Siorapaluk, Greenland - 300 km
	2001	Ski expedition from Isabella Bay, through Sverdrup Pass to Alexandra Fjord and around Pim Island - 200 km
	2005	Ski expedition on southern Ellesmere Island – 250 km
Greenland	2004	Ski expedition from Rensselaer Bay to Qaanaaq through Etah and across the Greenland Ice Sheet - 230 km
Northern Quebec	1999	Ski expedition down the Korac River in the Torngat Mountains - 150 km
Svalbard, Norway	2002	Ski traverse of Spitsbergen Island - 100 km

== Awards ==
Year	Award	Presented by
1989	International Fairplay Award	UNESCO for participation in the Polar Bridge Expedition
1989	Order of Friendship of Nations	Government of the Soviet Union
1992	Confederation Medal	Government of Canada, presented by then Speaker of the House of Commons of Canada, the Honourable John Allen Fraser P.C., Q.C.
1993	Russian Medal for Personal Courage	Government of Russia following a declaration signed by President Boris Yeltsin
1994	Meritorious Service Medal	Governor General of Canada
1996	Meritorious Service Medal	Governor General of Canada. Richard is the only person to be twice awarded this medal.
1996	Order of Friendship of Nations	Government of Russia
2015	Order of Canada	Government of Canada
2016	Ondaatje Medal	Royal Canadian Geographical Society

== Honors ==
Year	Honour
1997	Inducted into the Canadian Ski Museum's Hall of Fame

== What has been said about Weber ==
- "To my mind Richard Weber and Misha Malakhov are the greatest of all Arctic travellers. Their 1995 North Pole return journey was the most difficult polar challenge ever achieved." (Sir Ranulph Fiennes)
- "The Arctic is a very challenging terrain and in order to face it you need to be with the right people. There are no two better people in the world to be with than Mikhail Malakhov and Richard Weber. They are the best." (Robert Swan)
- "When I first heard that Weber and Malakhov were attempting this trip, I said, 'It's possible. They can do it; everyone one can do it.'" (Will Steger)
- "Above all, Richard got us there and was the best leader we could have possibly had - and the most skilled person on the ice in the world." (Adrian Hayes, 2007 North Pole expedition)

== Books ==
Year	Title	Publisher
1990	Polar Bridge, The Soviet Canadian Trans-Arctic Expedition	Key Porter Books
1996	Polar Attack, From Canada to the North Pole and Back	McCelland and Stewart
