= Transpolar Drift =

Current in the Arctic Ocean

The transpolar drift (purple arrows) is a dominant circulation feature in the Arctic Ocean that carries freshwater runoff (red arrows) from rivers in Russia across the North Pole and south towards Greenland. Under changing atmospheric conditions, emergent circulation patterns (blue arrows) drive freshwater runoff east towards Canada, resulting in freshening of Arctic water in the Canada Basin.

The Transpolar Drift stream is a major ocean current of the Arctic Ocean, transporting surface waters and sea ice from the Laptev Sea and the East Siberian Sea towards Fram Strait. Drift experiments with ships such as the Fram or the Tara expedition showed that the drift takes between two and four years. Recent satellite data and the most recent drift experiment, MOSAiC, shows that the current has accelerated and ice drifts much faster than earlier, in less than two years across the Arctic Ocean.

In 1937, Pyotr Shirshov at the Soviet drift ice station North Pole-1 described this drift. The stream conveys water in roughly two major routes to the northern Atlantic Ocean at a rate of about 1.5 miles (2.4 km) per day. Primarily wind-driven, it flows roughly from the northern coast of Russia and Alaska, sometimes curving toward the Beaufort Sea before exiting to the Atlantic Ocean. It has been cited as a major factor in the North Atlantic oscillation and Arctic oscillation atmospheric changes. The drift typically takes one of two paths before exiting into the northern Atlantic Ocean through the Fram Strait.

On decadal and longer timescales, the North Atlantic oscillation (NAO) and the Arctic oscillation (AO) indices affect the flow pattern of the transpolar drift stream. During times of positive NAO (NAO+) and positive AO (AO+), there is a weak Arctic high and the associated surface winds produce a cyclonic (anti-clockwise) ice drift motion in eastern Arctic Ocean. In this case, the drift flows from the Laptev Sea towards the Beaufort Sea before exiting the Arctic Ocean through the Fram Strait. Conversely, during periods of NAO- and AO-, there is a strong Arctic high and ice motion flows in an anticyclonic (clockwise) motion in the Eurasian Basin. In this phase, the drift flows directly from the Laptev Sea through the Fram Strait.

== See also ==
- Atlantic meridional overturning circulation
- Beaufort Gyre
