= Arctic Cape =

Headland in Severnaya Zemlya, Russia

Arctic Cape Мыс Арктический (Russian)
- Headland
- Location of Arctic Cape

- Coordinates: 81°16′15.8″N 95°47′4.7″E
- Location: Krasnoyarsk Krai, Russia
- Offshore water bodies: Arctic Ocean

Area
  - Total: Russian Far North

The Arctic Cape (Russian: Мыс Арктический, Mys Arkticheskiy) is a headland in Severnaya Zemlya, Russia.

With a distance of 990.8 km to the North Pole, the Arctic Cape is sometimes used as starting point for expeditions to the North Pole.

== Geography ==
Stretching out towards the Arctic Ocean by the Molotov Glacier, it is the northernmost point of Komsomolets Island, which in turn is the northernmost island of the archipelago. Under Joseph Stalin the cape was known as Cape Molotov.

The Arctic Cape is not the northernmost point of Russia. That distinction goes to Cape Fligely (Мыс Флигели, Mys Fligeli) on Rudolf Island (Остров Рудолфа, Ostrov Rudolfa), an island in the Franz Josef Land archipelago. The northernmost point of mainland Asia is Cape Chelyuskin.

This cape also marks the Kara Sea's northeastern limit, which is the eastern end of a line running from Cape Kohlsaat in Franz Josef Land to the Arctic Cape.

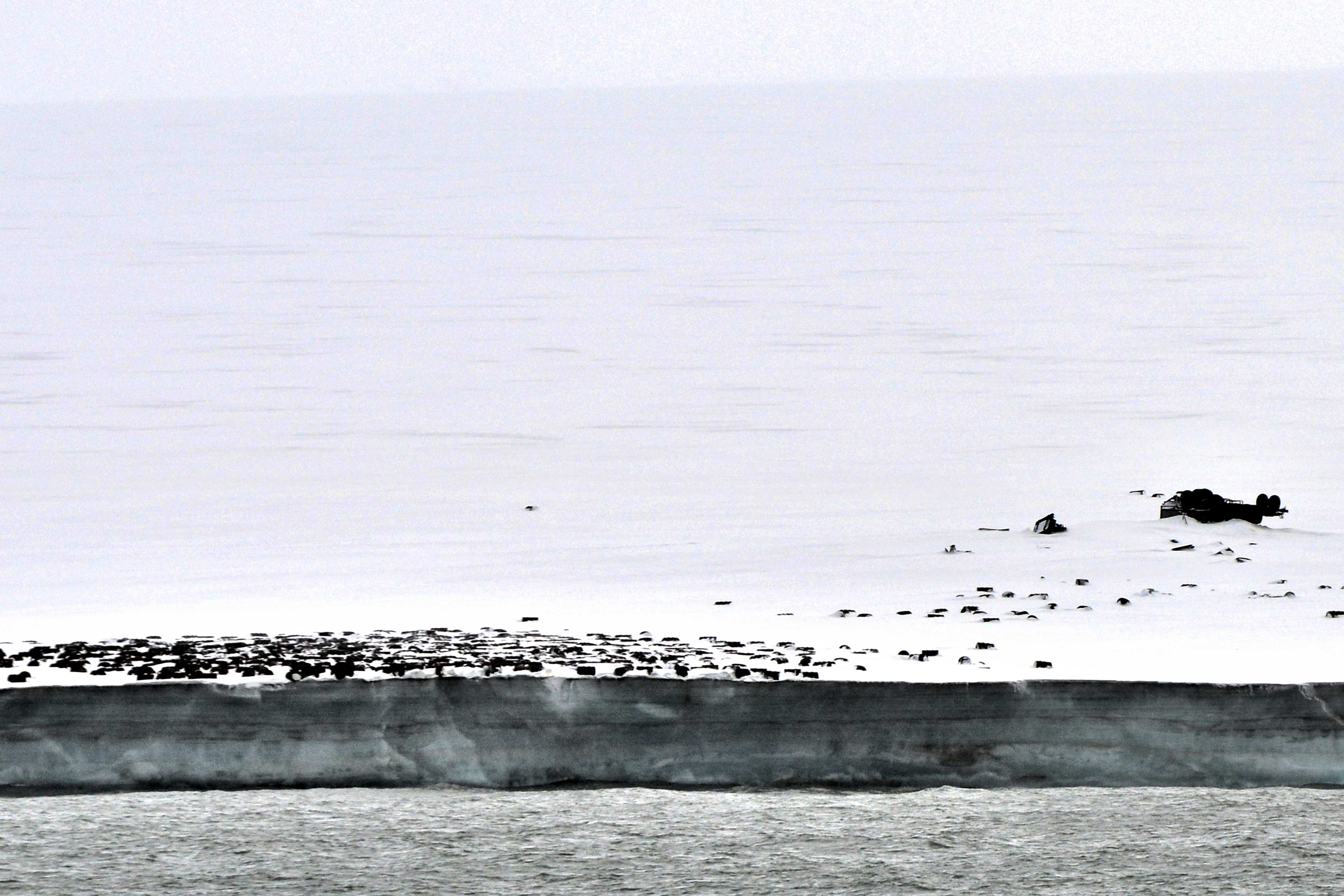
Empty oil drums at Arctic Cape
