= Will Steger =

American environmentalist (born 1944)

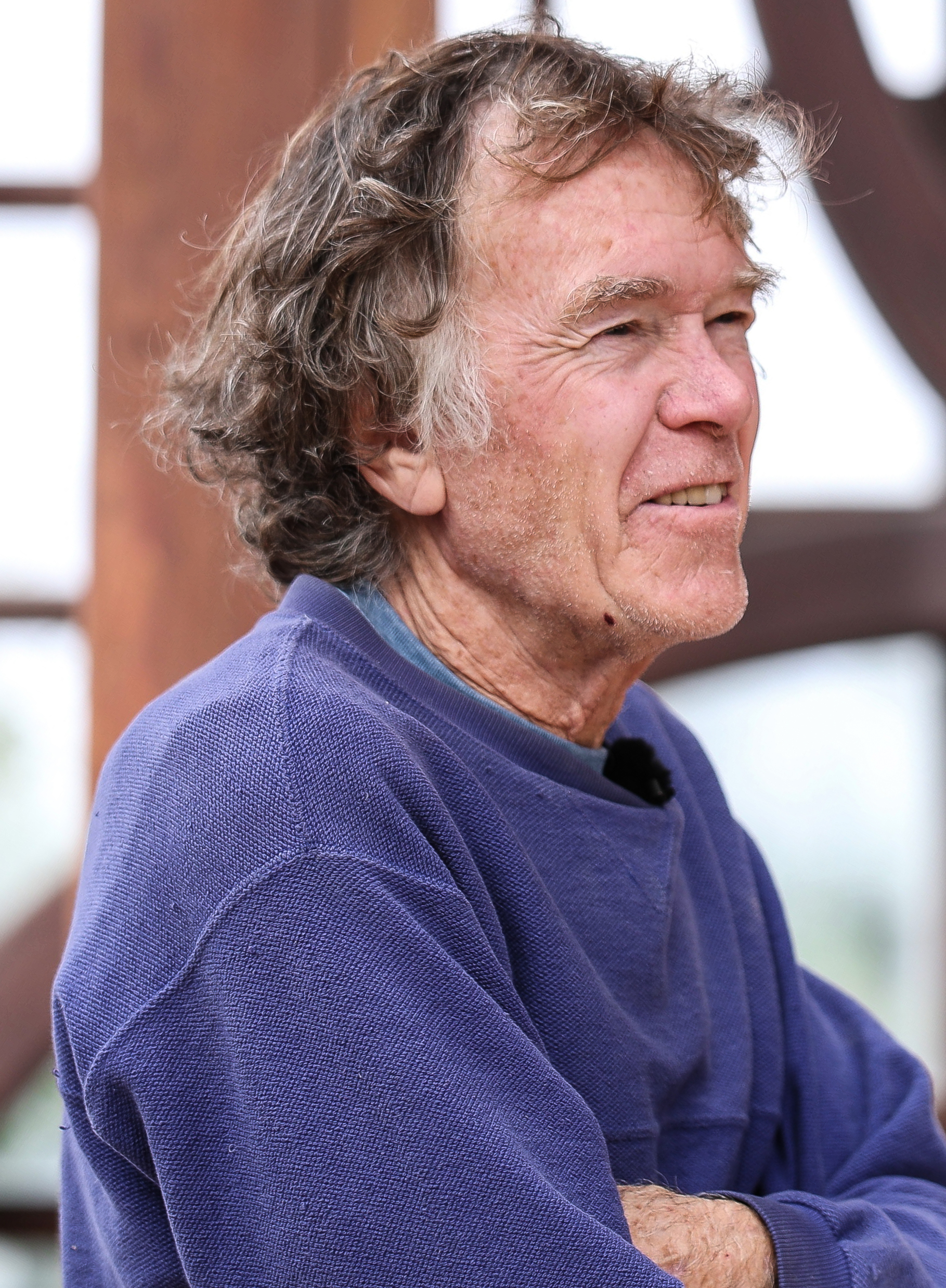
Image of Will Steger

Will Steger (born August 27, 1944, in Richfield, Minnesota) is a prominent spokesperson for the understanding and preservation of the Arctic and has led some of the most significant feats in the field of dogsled expeditions; such as the first confirmed dogsled journey to the North Pole (without re-supply) in 1986, the 1,600-mile south–north traverse of Greenland - the longest unsupported dogsled expedition in history at that time in 1988, the historic 3,741-mile International Trans-Antarctic Expedition - the first dogsled traverse of Antarctica (1989–90), and the International Arctic Project - the first and only dogsled traverse of the Arctic Ocean from Russia to Ellesmere Island in Canada during 1995.

Steger has been invited to testify before Congress on polar and environmental issues based on his first-hand experience in the Polar Regions and environmental expertise.

Steger co-founded the Center for Global Environmental Education (CGEE) at Hamline University in 1991 following the successful International Trans-Antarctic Expedition which reached 15 million students worldwide. In 1993, he founded the World School for Adventure Learning at the University of St. Thomas (Minnesota). In 2006, due to his growing concern about climate change, he established the Will Steger Foundation (now Climate Generation) to educate and empower people to engage in solutions to climate change. In 2014, he launched the Steger Wilderness Center, his final phase of his larger mission to keep the planet sustainable for future generations.

== Awards and accomplishments ==
Steger was a state champion wrestler at Benilde-St. Margaret's School, from which he graduated in 1962. He holds a Bachelor of Science in geology, Master of Arts in education and Honorary Doctorate from University of St. Thomas (Minnesota), in addition to Honorary Doctorates from Westminster College (Utah), Northland College (Wisconsin) and Franklin Pierce University.

In 1995 Steger joined Amelia Earhart, Robert Peary, Roald Amundsen and Jacques-Yves Cousteau in receiving the National Geographic Society's rarely-bestowed John Oliver La Gorce Medal for "accomplishments in geographic exploration, in the sciences, and for public service to advance international understanding". It was the first time the society presented this award in all three categories. The award has not been given since 1995.

Steger received recognition and numerous honors for record setting explorations and interactive educational initiatives: Explorers Club Finne Ronne Memorial Award 1997, National Geographic Society's First Explorer-in-Residence 1996, For his climate change efforts, he has been recognized with the Lindbergh Foundation's Lindbergh Award 2006, Governor Tim Pawlenty's Minnesota Climate Change Advisory Group 2006, Explorers Club Lowell Thomas Award 2007, and the National Geographic Adventure Lifetime Achievement Award 2007.

Steger's highly acclaimed articles and photographic images are appreciated worldwide, including in National Geographic. He authored four books and his publications, photographs and interviews are distributed globally: Over the Top of the World, Crossing Antarctica, North to the Pole, and Saving the Earth.

Each year, Steger gives more than 100 invited presentations on his eyewitness perspective. Between 2006 and 2008 Steger spoke to more than 640,000 people at public and private events, primarily through the activities of the Will Steger Foundation. Steger especially loves speaking to business leaders and to policymakers. His recent audiences around the country have included Goldman Sachs, the U.S. Environmental Protection Agency, SUPERVALU (United States), Target Corporation, UnitedHealth Group, Toro, Great River Energy, and Xcel Energy.

== Explorer-in-Residence Emeritus ==
Will Steger holds many titles: educator, author, photographer, and lecturer. Polar explorer is perhaps his best known and hardest-won. Steger first reached the North Pole in 1986, leading a team of six (Paul Schurke, Brent Boddy, Richard Weber, Geoff Carroll and Ann Bancroft) by dogsled. He returned again in 1995, while crossing the Arctic Ocean from Russia to Ellesmere Island, Canada, with a team of five by dogsled and specially adapted canoes.

Steger has also kayaked thousands of miles of northern rivers, including the Peace, Mackenzie, and Yukon.
