= Ann Bancroft =

American author, teacher, adventurer, and public speaker (born 1955)

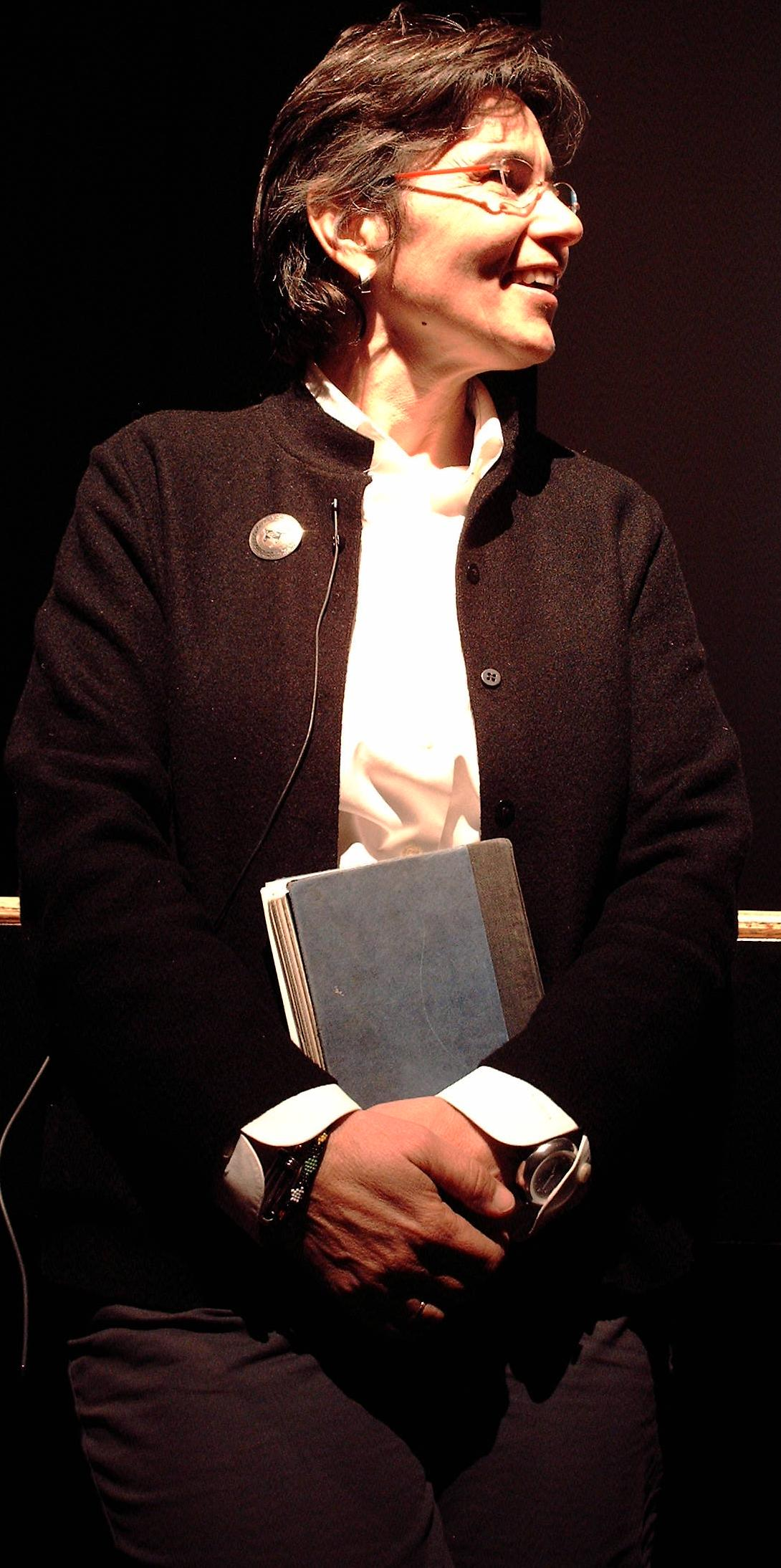
- Bancroft in 2006
- Born: September 29, 1955 (age 71); Mendota Heights, Minnesota, U.S.
- Education: University of Oregon
- Occupations: Explorer, teacher, author, public speaker
- Known for: First woman to trek to the North Pole
- Website: annbancroftfoundation.org

Ann Bancroft (born September 29, 1955) is an American author, teacher, adventurer, and public speaker. She was the first woman to finish a number of expeditions to the Arctic and Antarctic. She was inducted into the National Women's Hall of Fame in 1995.

== Biography ==
Bancroft was born in Mendota Heights, Minnesota, and grew up in St. Paul, Minnesota. Bancroft spent two years in Kenya in her fifth and sixth grades. Bancroft began leading wilderness expeditions when she was 8 years old when she convinced her cousins to join her on backyard expeditions. She described her family as one of risk takers. Bancroft struggled with dyslexia from an early age, but she nevertheless graduated from high school and was accepted at the University of Oregon where she graduated with a Physical Education Degree in 1981. Bancroft was a camper and staff member at YMCA Camp Widjiwagan in Ely, MN. Bancroft also taught Physical Education and Special Education in St. Paul and Minneapolis, Minnesota. Bancroft became a wilderness instructor and a gym teacher in Minneapolis (at Clara Barton Open School) and St. Paul.

Bancroft founded the Ann Bancroft Foundation in 1991 "to support the educational mission of the historic all-women's Antarctic polar expedition in 1993" The Ann Bancroft foundation supports the Wilderness Inquiry group and Bancroft currently teaches at Wilderness Inquiry. The Wilderness Inquiry group allows individuals and families to go on outdoor adventures, and the adventures are open to people of all ability levels. Bancroft currently co-owns an exploration company, Bancroft Arnesen Explore, with Liv Arnesen. Bancroft has been on expeditions on the Ganges River in India, crossed Greenland, traveled to the North Pole, and crossed the South Pole.

== Expeditions ==
Bancroft gave up her physical education and special education teaching posts in 1986 in order to participate with the "Will Steger International North Pole Expedition". She arrived at the North Pole together with five other team members after 56 days using dogsleds. This made Bancroft the first woman to reach the North Pole on foot and by sled.

She was also the first woman to cross both polar ice caps to reach the North and South Poles. In 1992–1993, Bancroft led a four-woman expedition to the South Pole on skis; this expedition was the first all-female expedition to cross the ice to the South Pole.

In 2001, Bancroft and Norwegian adventurer Liv Arnesen became the first women to ski across Antarctica.

In March 2007, Bancroft and Liv Arnesen took part in a trek across the Arctic Ocean to draw attention to the problem of global warming. The two explorers were followed by millions of school children. However, according to The Washington Post, the expedition was called off "after Liv Arnesen suffered frostbite in three of her toes, and extreme cold temperatures drained the batteries in some of their electronic equipment."

Between October and December 2015, Bancroft and Liv Arnesen led the first Access Water expedition, travelling the length of the Ganges from Gomukh in the Himalayas to Kolkata near the Bay of Bengal. The team of eight women covered 1,569 miles in 60 days, with the aim of raising awareness of the need for clean and safe water and of the way waste travels downstream.

The Ganges journey in 2015 was part of Access Water, a programme that Bancroft Arnesen Explore describes as eight women, on seven continents, over twelve years, paddling a significant body of water on each continent to address water sustainability issues, supported by experiential education programmes for young people. Other parts of the programme have included a visit to the Yangtze in China in 2016 and an expedition in New Zealand under the name Access Water Aotearoa.

== Activist ==
Bancroft is openly a lesbian and in 2006, she publicly campaigned against a proposed amendment to the Minnesota Constitution to prohibit any legal recognition of marriages or civil unions between members of the same sex.

Bancroft also supports awareness of Access Water, Winter Warm-Up challenges, and global warming.

== Select achievements ==
- First woman to reach the North Pole in 1986.
- Named Woman of the Year by Ms. Magazine in 1987.
- Leader of the first east–west crossing of Greenland in 1992.
- Became the first woman to reach both poles in 1992.
- Leader of the first all-female expedition to the South Pole in 1992–1993.
- Included in Remarkable Women of the Twentieth Century in 1998.
- Second woman (after Liv Arnesen) to cross Antarctica on foot in 2001.
- Named Woman of the Year by Glamour Magazine in 2001.
- Inducted into the National Women's Hall of Fame in 1995.
- Attempted another expedition to the North Pole with Liv Arnesen, but frostbite stopped their trek in 2007
- Named one of history's greatest polar explorers in 2011.
- Finished the first Source to Sea Access Water expedition on the Ganges River with seven other women in 2015, covering 1,500 miles in 60 days.

== Books ==
- Bancroft, Ann; Nancy Loewen (2001). Four to the Pole! The American Women's Expedition to Antarctica, 1992–1993. Linnet Books.
- Arnesen, Liv; Ann Bancroft; with Cheryl Dahle (2003). No Horizon Is So Far: Two Women and Their Extraordinary Journey Across Antarctica. Da Capo Press. ISBN 0-7382-0794-2. The book describes Ann Bancroft's and Liv Arnesen's 1,700 mile trek across Antarctica in 2000–2001; it won an Amelia Bloomer award in 2005.
