= List of Antarctic expeditions =

Terra Australis
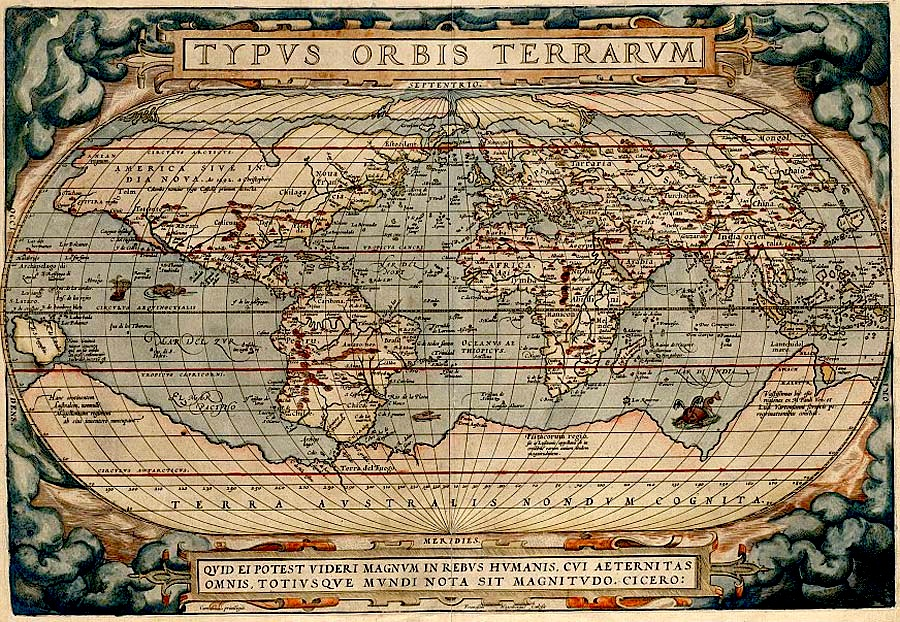
- Terra Australis is the large continent on the bottom of this 1570 map

This list of Antarctica expeditions is a chronological list of expeditions involving Antarctica. Although the existence of a southern continent had been hypothesized as early as the writings of Ptolemy in the 1st century AD, the South Pole was not reached until 1911.

== Pre-exploration theories ==
- 600 BC – 300 BC – Greek philosophers theorize Spherical Earth with North and South Polar regions.
- 150 AD – Ptolemy published Geographia, which notes Terra Australis Incognita.

== Pre-19th century ==
- 13th century – Polynesians settle Auckland Islands (50° S)
- 1501–1502 – Gonçalo Coelho and Amerigo Vespucci possibly sail to (52° S)
- 1522 – Juan Sebastián Elcano – first circumnavigation Fernando de Magallanes discovers Strait of Magellan (54° S)
- 1526 – Francisco de Hoces reportedly blown south from Strait of Magellan to (56° S). He discovers the Drake Passage or Mar de Hoces.
- 1578 – Francis Drake claims to have discovered an ocean south of South America and "Elizabeth Island" (57° S)
- 1599 – Dirk Gerritsz – potentially sails to (64° S)
- 1603 – Gabriel de Castilla – potentially sails to (64° S)
- 1615 – Jacob Le Maire and Willem Schouten first to sail around Cape Horn cross (56° S)
- 1619 – García de Nodal expedition – circumnavigate Tierra del Fuego and discover Diego Ramírez Islands (56°30′S 68°43′W)
- 1643 – Dutch expedition to Valdivia – northerly winds push the expedition as far south as 61°59 S where icebergs were abundant. The expedition disproves beliefs that Isla de los Estados was part of Terra Australis.
- 1675 – Anthony de la Roché discovers South Georgia (54°15′00″S 36°45′00″W), the first ever land discovered south of the Antarctic Convergence
- 1698–1699 – Edmond Halley sails to (52° S)
- 1720 – George Shelvocke – sails to (61° 30′ S)
- 1739 – Jean-Baptiste Charles Bouvet de Lozier – discovers Bouvet Island (54°26′S 3°24′E)
- 1771 – James Cook – HM Bark Endeavour expedition
- 1771–1772 – Yves-Joseph de Kerguelen-Trémarec discovers Kerguelen Islands (49°15′S 69°35′E)
- 1772–1775 – James Cook – sails HMS Resolution crossing Antarctic Circle in January 1773 and December 1773. On 30 January 1774 he reaches 71° 10′ S, his Farthest South, coming within about 120 kilometres (75 mi) of the Antarctic mainland without seeing it.

== 19th century ==
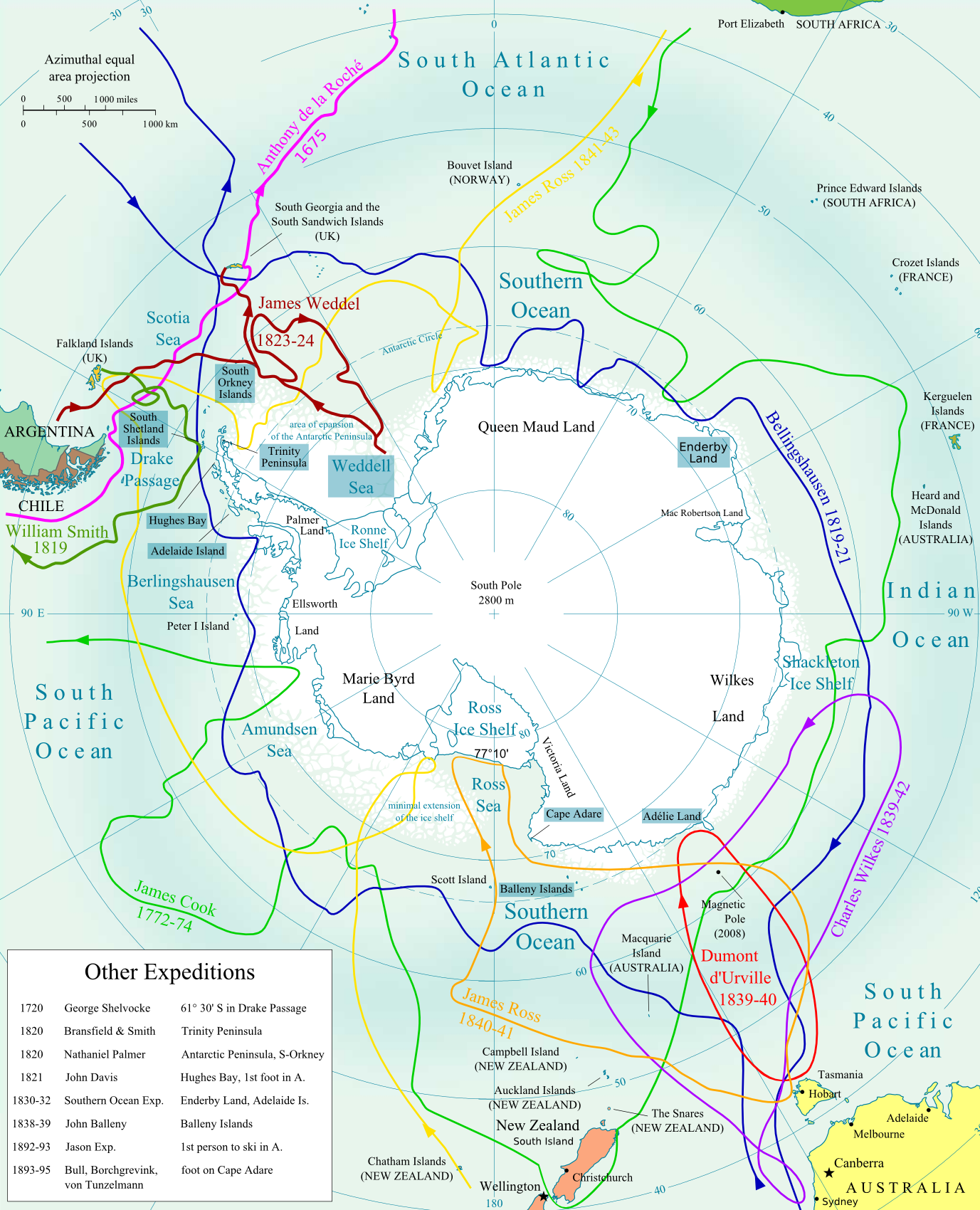
Expeditions in Antarctica before the Heroic Age of Antarctic Exploration, 1897

- 1780s to 1839 – American and British whalers and sealers make incidental discoveries.
- 1819 – William Smith discovers South Shetland Islands (62°00′S 58°00′W), the first land discovered south of 60° south latitude.
- 1819 – San Telmo is wrecked in the Drake Passage off Livingston Island.
- 1819–1821 – Fabian Gottlieb von Bellingshausen and Mikhail Lazarev, future Admirals of Russian Imperial Navy, during Russian circumnavigation expedition, on 27 January 1820 were stopped by impassable ice in 95 km (50 nmi) of Princess Martha Coast that later became known as the floating fragments of Fimbul Ice Shelf (69°21′S 2°15′W). Bellingshausen and Lazarev became the first explorers to see and officially discover Alexander Island and Peter I Island in Antarctica in 21–28 January 1821.
- 1820–1821 – Captain Andrew MacFarlane, commanding the Chilean-registered brig Dragón de Valparaíso, hunts seals in the South Shetland Islands from about October 1820. According to the British sealer Robert Fildes, MacFarlane told him that he had landed on the land south of Deception Island, on the western side of the Antarctic Peninsula. The historian Jorge Guzmán identifies this coast as the present-day Davis Coast (64°00′S 60°30′W). If accepted, this would possibly be the first recorded landing on the Antarctic continent, before that of John Davis on 7 February 1821.
- 1820 – Edward Bransfield with William Smith as his pilot – on 30 January 1820, sight Trinity Peninsula (63°37′S 58°20′W).
- 1820 – Nathaniel Palmer sights Antarctica on 17 November 1820
- 1821 – George Powell, a British sealer, and Nathaniel B. Palmer, an American sealer, discover the South Orkney Islands. Powell annexes them for the British.
- 1821 – John Davis – on 7 February 1821 disputed claim of setting foot on Antarctica at Hughes Bay (64°13′S 61°20′W)
- 1823–1824 – James Weddell discovers the Weddell Sea; – on 20 February 1823 his ship Jane (160 tons) reached a new Farthest South of 74° 15′ S (74°15′S 30°12′W)
- 1829-1831 - Palmer–Pendleton Expedition
- 1830–1833 – Southern Ocean Expedition led by John Biscoe, an English sealer; circumnavigates the continent, sets foot on Anvers Island, names and annexes Graham Land, discovers Biscoe Islands, Queen Adelaide Island (67°15′S 68°30′W) and sights Enderby Land (67°30′S 53°0′E)
- 1837–1840 – First French Antarctic Expedition – led by Jules Dumont d'Urville; discovers Adélie Land and sets foot on an islet of Géologie Archipelago (66°36′S 140°4′E) 4 km from the mainland to take mineral and animal samples (66° S)
- 1838–1839 – John Balleny discovers Balleny Islands (66°55′S 163°45′E)
- 1838–1842 – United States Exploring Expedition – led by Charles Wilkes to Antarctic Peninsula (69°30′S 65°00′W) and eastern Antarctica; discovers "Termination Barrier" ("Shackleton Ice Shelf")
- 1839–1843 – James Clark Ross's expedition of 1839 to 1843 discovered the Ross Ice Shelf, Ross Sea, Mount Erebus, Mount Terror and Victoria Land; extended his Farthest South to 78° 10′ S on 23 January 1842
- 1851–1853 – Mercator Cooper landed on what is now known as Oates Coast in what is probably the first adequately documented landing on the mainland of Antarctica.
- 1872–1872 – German Antarctic Expedition under Eduard Dallmann, aboard the Grönland.
- 1872–1876 – HMS Challenger under Capt. George S. Nares, becomes the first steamship to cross the Antarctic Circle; reopens the study of oceanography in the region after a 30-year gap.
- 1892–1893 – Carl Anton Larsen led the first Norwegian expedition to Antarctica aboard the ship Jason. Larsen became the first person to ski in Antarctica where the Larsen Ice Shelf was named after him.
- 1892–1893 – Dundee Whaling Expedition discover Dundee Island (63°30′S 55°55′W)
- 1893–1894 – Carl Anton Larsen led the second Norwegian expedition to Antarctica, commissioned and funded by the German shipping company Oceana
- 1893–1895 – Henryk Bull, Carstens Borchgrevink and Alexander von Tunzelmann – set foot on Antarctica at Cape Adare
- 1897–1899 – Belgian Antarctic Expedition – led by Adrien de Gerlache; first to winter South of the Antarctic Circle.
- 1898–1900 – Southern Cross Expedition, Carsten Borchgrevink – sails to Cape Adare, winters on Antarctica and takes Farthest South on 16 February 1900 at 78° 50′ S

== 20th century ==
- 1901–1904 – Discovery Expedition – led by Robert Falcon Scott, on 30 December 1903, reached (82° 17′S)
- 1902 - First balloon flight over Antarctica by Robert Falcon Scott
- 1901–1903 – Gauss expedition (or First German Antarctic Expedition) – led by Erich von Drygalski
- 1901–1903 – Swedish Antarctic Expedition – led by Otto Nordenskjöld with captain Carl Anton Larsen
- 1902–1904 – Scottish National Antarctic Expedition – led by William Speirs Bruce
- 1903–1905 – Second French Antarctic Expedition – led by Jean-Baptiste Charcot
- 1907–1909 – Nimrod Expedition – On 9 January 1909, Ernest Shackleton reached 88° 23 ′S (Farthest South), and on 16 January 1909, Professor Edgeworth David reached the South Magnetic Pole at (72°25′S 155°16′E) (mean position)
- 1908–1910 – Third French Antarctic Expedition – led by Jean-Baptiste Charcot
- 1910–1912 – Japanese Antarctic Expedition – led by Nobu Shirase
- 1910–1912 – Roald Amundsen's South Pole expedition – On 14 December 1911, reached the South Pole (90° S)
- 1910–1913 – Terra Nova Expedition – On 17 January 1912, Robert Falcon Scott, reached the South Pole (90° S)
- 1911–1913 – Second German Antarctic Expedition – led by Wilhelm Filchner
- 1911–1914 – Australasian Antarctic Expedition – led by Douglas Mawson
- 1914–1916 – Imperial Trans-Antarctic Expedition – led by Ernest Shackleton
- 1914–1917 – Ross Sea party – led by Aeneas Mackintosh
- 1920–1922 – British Graham Land Expedition – a British expedition to Graham Land led by John Lachlan Cope
- 1921–1922 – Shackleton–Rowett Expedition – led by Ernest Shackleton – the last expedition of the Heroic Age of Antarctic Exploration
- 1924–1951 – Discovery Investigations
- 1928 - First aeroplane flight over Antarctica by Hubert Wilkins and Carl Ben Eielson
- 1929–1931 – British Australian and New Zealand Antarctic Research Expedition (BANZARE) – led by Douglas Mawson
- 1928–1930 – Richard Evelyn Byrd – First expedition
- 1931 – H. Halvorsen – discovered Princess Astrid Coast
- 1931 – Hjalmar Riiser-Larsen – flew over Antarctica, discovered Kronprins Olav Kyst
- 1933–1935 – Richard Evelyn Byrd – Second expedition
- 1933–1939 – Lincoln Ellsworth – Aircraft expedition, first to fly across Antarctica
- 1934–1937 – British Graham Land Expedition (BGLE) – led by John Riddoch Rymill
- 1936 – Lars Christensen – dropped Norwegian flag over Prince Harald Coast
- 1938 -1939 – German Antarctic Expedition (1938–1939), – led by Capt. Alfred Ritscher
- 1939–1941 – United States Antarctic Service Expedition – led by Richard Evelyn Byrd (Byrd's third expedition)
- 1943–1945 – Operation Tabarin – led by Lieutenant James Marr
- 1946–1947 – Operation Highjump – led by Richard Evelyn Byrd (Byrd's fourth expedition)
- 1947 – First Chilean Antarctic Expedition
- 1947–1948 – Operation Windmill – led by Commander Gerald Ketchum
- 1947–1948 – Ronne Antarctic Research Expedition – led by Finn Ronne
- 1948–1949 – Fourth French Antarctic Expedition (ship Commandant Charcot) – led by André-Frank Liotard
- 1949–1951 – Fifth French Antarctic Expedition : Port Martin Station established in Adélie Land – led by André-Frank Liotard
- 1949–1952 – Norwegian–British–Swedish Antarctic Expedition – led by John Giaever
- 1950–1952 – Sixth French Antarctic Expedition – led by Michel Barré
- 1951-1953 – Seventh French Antarctic Expedition : Petrel Island Station established in Adélie Land – led by Mario Marret
- 1953 – Esperanza Base established
- 1954 – Mawson Station established
- 1955–1956 – Operation Deep Freeze – led by Richard Evelyn Byrd (Byrd's fifth expedition)
- 1955–1957 – Falkland Island Dependency Aerial Survey led by P G Mott
- 1955–1957 – 1st Soviet Antarctic Expedition – led by Mikhail Somov
- 1955–1958 – Commonwealth Trans-Antarctic Expedition – led by Vivian Fuchs (UK); New Zealand support led by Edmund Hillary
- 1956 – Dumont d'Urville Station established
- 1956 – Amundsen–Scott South Pole Station established
- 1956 - McMurdo Station established
- 1956–1958 – 2nd Soviet Antarctic Expedition – led by Aleksei Treshnikov
- 1957–1958 – International Geophysical Year
- 1957–1958 – New Zealand Geological Survey Antarctic Expedition
- 1957 – Scott Base established
- 1957–1958 – Luncke Expedition
- 1957–1959 – 3rd Soviet Antarctic Expedition – led by Yevgeny Tolstikov
- 1958–1959 – New Zealand Geological Survey Antarctic Expedition
- 1958–1960 – 4th Soviet Antarctic Expedition – led by Aleksandr Dralkin
- 1959– 1960 – New Zealand Alpine Club Antarctic Expedition - led by Robert Cawley (see NZAJ 1960 p. 253–)
- 1959–1961 – 5th Soviet Antarctic Expedition – led by Yevgeny Korotkevich
- 1960 – South African National Antarctic Expedition
- 1960–1962 – 6th Soviet Antarctic Expedition – led by V. Driatsky
- 1961–1963 – 7th Soviet Antarctic Expedition – led by Aleksandr Dralkin
- 1962–1962 – Vostok traverse – led by Australian National Antarctic Research Expeditions (ANARE)
- 1962–1963 – New Zealand Federated Mountain Clubs Antarctic Expedition – Led by John M. Millen
- 1962–1964 – 8th Soviet Antarctic Expedition – led by Mikhail Somov
- 1963–1965 – 9th Soviet Antarctic Expedition – led by Mikhail Somov and Pavel Senko
- 1964–1965 – South Pole—Queen Maud Land Traverse I
- 1964–1966 – 10th Soviet Antarctic Expedition – led by M. Ostrekin, I. Petrov
- 1965–1966 – South Pole—Queen Maud Land Traverse II
- 1965–1967 – 11th Soviet Antarctic Expedition – led by D. Maksutov, Leonid Dubrovin
- 1965–1965 – Operación 90 – Terrestrial Argentine Expedition to the South Pole Led by Coronel D. Jorge Leal.
- 1966–1968 – 12th Soviet Antarctic Expedition – led by Pavel Senko and Vladislav Gerbovich
- 1966–1967 – New Zealand Antarctic Research Programme Mariner Glacier Northern Party Expedition – led by John E S Lawrence
- 1967–1968 – South Pole—Queen Maud Land Traverse III
- 1967–1969 – 13th Soviet Antarctic Expedition – led by Aleksei Treshnikov
- 1968–1970 – 14th Soviet Antarctic Expedition – led by D. Maksutov, Ernst Krenkel
- 1969 – Base Presidente Eduardo Frei Montalva established
- 1969–1970 – New Zealand Geological Survey Antarctic Expedition
- 1969–1971 – 15th Soviet Antarctic Expedition – led by Pavel Senko and Vladislav Gerbovich
- 1970–1972 – 16th Soviet Antarctic Expedition – led by I. Petrov and Yury Tarbeyev
- 1971–1973 – 17th Soviet Antarctic Expedition – led by Yevgeny Korotkevich, V. Averyanov
- 1972–1974 – 18th Soviet Antarctic Expedition – led by Pavel Senko
- 1973–1975 – 19th Soviet Antarctic Expedition – led by D. Maksutov, V. Ignatov
- 1974–1976 – 20th Soviet Antarctic Expedition – led by V. Serdyukov, N. Kornilov
- 1975–1977 – 21st Soviet Antarctic Expedition – led by O. Sedov, G. Bardin
- 1976–1978 – 22nd Soviet Antarctic Expedition – led by N. Tyabin, Leonid Dubrovin
- 1977–1979 – 23rd Soviet Antarctic Expedition – led by V. Serdyukov, O. Sedov
- 1978 – Fortín Sargento Cabral established
- 1978–1980 – 24th Soviet Antarctic Expedition – led by A. Artemyev, O. Sedov
- 1979 – Air New Zealand Flight 901 – airplane crash
- 1979–1980 – 25th Soviet Antarctic Expedition – led by N. Kornilov, N. Tyabin
- 1980–1981 – Transglobe Expedition – led by Ranulph Fiennes
- 1980–1982 – 26th Soviet Antarctic Expedition – led by V. Serdyukov, V. Shamontyev
- 1981–1983 – 27th Soviet Antarctic Expedition – led by D. Maksutov, R. Galkin
- 1981–1982 – First Indian Expedition to Antarctica – led by Dr. Sayed Zahoor Qasim
- 1982 – Falkland Islands War
- 1982–1983 – First Brazilian Expedition to Antarctica –
- 1982–1983 – Second Indian Expedition to Antarctica – led by V. K. Raina
- 1982–1984 – 28th Soviet Antarctic Expedition – led by N. Kornilov, A. Artemyev
- 1984 – Villa Las Estrellas established
- 1983–1985 – 29th Soviet Antarctic Expedition – led by N. Tyabin, L. Bulatov
- 1983–1985 – Third Indian Expedition to Antarctica
- 1984–1987 – In the Footsteps of Scott – led by Robert Swan
- 1984–1985 – 1st Uruguayan Antarctic Expedition – Antarkos I Led by Lt. Col. Omar Porciúncula
- 1984–1986 – 30th Soviet Antarctic Expedition – led by D. Maksutov, R. Galkin
- 1985–1987 – 31st Soviet Antarctic Expedition – led by N. Tyabin, V. Dubovtsev
- 1986–1988 – 32nd Soviet Antarctic Expedition – led by V. Klokov, V. Vovk
- 1987 – Iceberg B-9 calves and carries away Little Americas I – III
- 1987–1989 – 33rd Soviet Antarctic Expedition – led by N.A. Kornilov, Yu.A. Khabarov
- 1987–1988 – First Bulgarian Antarctic Expedition – St. Kliment Ohridski Base established
- 1988–1990 – 34th Soviet Antarctic Expedition – led by S.M. Pryamikov, L.V. Bulatov
- 1988–1989 – South Pole Overland. Patriot Hills to South Pole. First commercial Ski expedition to South Pole. 1200 km, 50 days – led by Martyn Williams
- 1989–1990 – Antarctic crossing on foot by Reinhold Messner and Arved Fuchs. 2800 km. 92 days
- 1989–1990 – 1990 International Trans-Antarctica Expedition – led by American Will Steger and Frenchman Jean-Louis Étienne, first un-mechanized crossing – 6,021 km, 220-days
- 1989–1991 – 35th Soviet Antarctic Expedition – led by V.M. Piguzov
- 1990 – 1st North Korean Antarctic Expedition
- 1990 – Snotsicle Traverse Ski expedition – South Pole to Ross Sea inland edge via Scott Glacier. 9 611 km in 35 days– led by Martyn Williams
- 1990–1991 – 2nd North Korean Antarctic Expedition
- 1991 – Serap Z. Tilav, a US Antarctic Program field team member, became the first Turkish woman at the South Pole.
- 1991–1992 – 36th Soviet Antarctic Expedition – led by Lev Savatyugin
- 1992–1993 – American Women's Antarctic Expedition- AWE. First team of women to ski to the South Pole: Ann Bancroft, Sunniva Sorby, Anne DalVera, Sue Giller- 67 days
- 1992–1993 – British Polar Plod – led by Ranulph Fiennes with Mike Stroud (physician), first unassisted expedition crossing the continent by ski, (2,173 km in 95 days)
- 1992–1993 – Erling Kagge (Norway), first unassisted, and first solo expedition to the South Pole by ski, (1,310 km in 53 days)
- 1992–1993 – Antarctic Environmental Research Expedition – led by Kenji Yoshikawa
- 1994 – Liv Arnesen (Norway), first unassisted woman to the South Pole by ski, (1,200 km in 50 days)
- 1994 – Cato Zahl Pedersen (Norway) becomes the first person with no arms to ski to the South Pole (1400 km from Berkner Island), together with Lars Ebbesen and Odd Harald Hauge
- 1995 – "A Pole at the Poles" – Marek Kamiński solo expedition to the South Pole from Berkner Island (1,400 km in 53 days);
- 1995–1996 – Bernard Voyer and Thierry Pétry unassisted expedition to the South Pole by ski
- 1996 – Lake Vostok discovered
- 1996–1997 – "Solo TransAntarctica" – Marek Kamiński attempted solo crossing of Antarctica (1,450 km);
- 1996–1997 – Børge Ousland (Norway) first person to travel across Antarctica solo. The crossing went from coast to coast, from Berkner Island to the Ross Sea, and was unsupported (without resupplies). He used a kite as traction for parts of the expedition. 63 days, 3,000 km
- 1997–1998 – Peter Treseder, Keith Williams & Ian Brown become the first Australians to ski unsupported (no sail) to the South Geographic Pole, 1317 km in 59 days from Berkner Island, 2Nov-31Dec, flown out by ANI.
- 1998–1999 – Eric Philips, Jon Muir and Peter Hillary pioneer a new route from Ross Island to the South Pole through the Transantarctic Mountains via the Shackleton then Zaneveld glaciers. The expedition covers 1425 km in 84 days setting off 4 November 1998 and arriving 26 January 1999. The team were not able to complete their original objective of completing the first unassisted return journey to the South Pole.

== 21st century ==
- 2000–2001– Norwegian Liv Arnesen and the American Ann Bancroft crossed Antarctica on ski-sail from Blue 1 Runaway 13 November reaching after 94 days of expedition McMurdo Station, passing through the South Pole.
- 2001–2002 – First and longest sea kayak expedition by New Zealanders Graham Charles, Marcus Waters and Mark Jones paddle unsupported from Hope Bay to Adelaide Island in 35 days.
- 2004 – Scot100 First ever Scottish Expedition to South Pole began in October 2004 – a century after a historic expedition led by William Speirs Bruce, Edinburgh's "unknown" explorer, who Craig Mathieson views as "truly the greatest polar explorer of all time".
- 2004 – Together to the Pole – a Polish four-man expedition led by Marek Kamiński, with Jan Mela (a teenage double amputee, who in the same year reached also the North Pole)
- 2004–2005 – Chilean South Pole Expedition.
- 2004–2005 – Tangra 2004/05 created Camp Academia.
- 2005 – Ice Challenger Expedition travelled to the South Pole in a six-wheeled vehicle.
- 2005–2006 – Spanish Trans-Antarctic Expedition, led by Ramon Larramendi, reached the Southern Pole of Inaccessibility using kite-sleds.
- 2005-2006 – Construction of the South Pole Traverse completed
- 2006 – Hannah McKeand sets coast-to-pole solo/unsupported record of 39 days, 9 hours and 33 minutes
- 2006–2007 – Jenny and Ray Jardine 57-day ski trek to South Pole
- 2007 – Pat Falvey leads an Irish team to reach the South Pole, skiing 1140 km only weeks after completing an unsupported Ski traverse of the Greenland Ice Cap in August 2007 in honour of Irish Polar Explorers such as Ernest Shackleton and Tom Crean. Clare O'Leary becomes the first Irish female to reach the South Pole.
- 2007-2008 - First African unsupported and unassisted walk to the South Pole. South Africans Alex Harris and Sibusiso Vilane spent 65 days walking from Hercules Inlet.
- 2007–2008 – Norwegian-U.S. Scientific Traverse of East Antarctica.
- 2007–2008 – British Army Antarctic Expedition 2007–2008
- 2007–2008 – Verden Vakreste Skitur. Randi Skaug, Kristin Moe-Krohn and Anne-Mette Nørregaard skied unsupported from Patriot Hills across The Sentinel range to Vinson Massif to climb Mount Vinson
- 2008 – Todd Carmichael sets coast-to-pole solo/unsupported record of 39 days, 7 hours and 49 minutes
- 2008 – First Venezuelan Scientific Expedition to Antarctica.
- 2008–2009 – The Antarctica Challenge – Canada-US International Polar Year documentary film production expedition led by Mark Terry.
- 2008–2009 – Impossible 2 Possible (i2P) unsupported South Pole quest by Ray Zahab, Kevin Vallely and Richard Weber.
- 2009 – Azerbaijan Scientific Expedition, Huseyngulu Baghirov and Tarlan Ramazanov became the first Muslims and Turks to reach the South Pole on foot.
- 2009 – Kaspersky Commonwealth Antarctic Expedition, largest and most international group of women to ski to South Pole.
- 2009 – Second Venezuelan Scientific Expedition to Antarctica.
- 2009–2010 – Unsupported/Unassisted Antarctica Ski Traverse from Berkner Island to South Pole to Ross Sea by Cecilie Skog and Ryan Waters.
- 2010 – Moon Regan Transantarctic Crossing, first wheeled transantarctic crossing and first bio-fuelled vehicle to travel to the South Pole.
- 2010 – Third Venezuelan Scientific Expedition to Antarctica.
- 2011 – Fourth Venezuelan Scientific Expedition to Antarctica.
- 2011–2012 – From Novolazarevskaya to Pole of Inaccessibility to South Pole to Hercules inlet by Sebastian Copeland and Eric McNair Landry by kites and skis.
- 2011–2012 – Scott Amundsen Centenary Race – Henry Worsley and Louis Rudd ski 1,300 km (800 mi) unsupported along the original route of Amundsen from the Bay of Whales up the Axel Heiberg to the SP racing against Mark Langridge, Vic Vicary and Kev Johnson completing Capt Scott's original route.
- 2011–2012 – British Services Antarctic Expedition 2012
- 2011–2012 – Expedition by Ramon Hernando de Larramendi, by Inuit WindSled.
- 2012 – Felicity Aston becomes the first person to ski alone across Antarctica using only personal muscle power, as well as the first woman to cross Antarctica alone. Her journey began on 25 November 2011, at the Leverett Glacier, and continued for 59 days and a distance of 1,744 km (1,084 mi).
- 2012 – Fifth Venezuelan Scientific Expedition to Antarctica.
- 2012–2013 – Aaron Linsdau becomes the second American to ski solo from the Hercules Inlet to the South Pole. His original plan was to make a round trip but through a series of problems, like all other expeditions this year, was unable to make the return journey.
- 2012 – Eric Larsen attempts a bicycle ride from coast to South Pole. Completes a quarter of the distance.
- 2012 – Grant Korgan becomes the first person with a spinal cord injury to literally "push" himself to the geographic South Pole!
- 2012–2013 – Shackleton's centenary re-enactment expedition of the journey of the James Caird aboard the replica Alexandra Shackleton. Six British and Australian Explorers completed the "double journey" on 10 February 2013 after the 1,300-kilometre (800 mi) journey from Elephant Island to South Georgia and the mountain crossing.
- 2013 – Sixth Venezuelan Scientific Expedition to Antarctica.
- 2013–2014 – Ben Saunders and Tarka L'Herpiniere make the first ever completion of the Terra Nova Expedition first taken by Robert Falcon Scott in January 1912. Their 2,898-kilometre (1,801 mi), 105-day return journey to the South Pole is the longest ever polar journey on foot.
- 2013 – Parker Liautaud and Douglas Stoup attempt in December 2013 the Willis Resilience Expedition to set a "coast to Pole" speed record by reaching the geographical South Pole on skis in the fastest journey ever recorded from an interior of continent start while being followed by a support vehicle.
- 2013 – Antony Jinman will walk to the South Pole solo for the 2013 ETE Teachers South Pole Mission, during which he will be in daily contact with schoolchildren from across the United Kingdom and will make films using the world's first drone flights at the South Pole.
- 2013 – Maria Leijerstam becomes the first person to cycle from the Antarctic coast to South Pole. She also set the human powered speed record in 10 days, 14 hours and 56 minutes.
- 2013–2014 – Lewis Clarke (aged 16 years and 61 days) guided by Carl Alvey (aged 30) became the youngest person to trek from the Antarctic coast at Hercules Inlet to the South Pole. His expedition was in support of the Prince's Trust and his achievement is recognised by Guinness World Records.
- 2013–2014 – Married couple Christine (Chris) Fagan and Marty Fagan became the first American married couple (and second married couple in history) to complete a full unguided, unsupported, unassisted ski from the Antarctic coast to the South Pole. They join just over 100 people in history who have traveled to the South Pole in this manner. Their expedition took 48 days. Their achievement is recognized by Guinness World Records.
- 2013–2014 – Daniel P. Burton completes the first bicycle ride from coast to the South Pole.
- 2013–2014 – Chris Turney led an expedition, entitled "Spirit of Mawson", aimed at highlighting the decline in sea ice due to climate change. The expedition was abandoned when its Russian ship became stuck in unusually large amounts of sea ice.
- 2013–2014 – Geoff Wilson using a snow kite completed a solo unsupported crossing beginning near the Russian Novolazarevskaya Station and finishing at Hercules Inlet, breaking the record for the fastest coast to coast and fastest unsupported solo crossing (3428 km, 53 Days)
- 2013 – In December 2013 the Expeditions 7 Team led by Scott Brady made a successful east-to-west crossing in four-wheel drive vehicles from Novolazarevskaya to the Ross Ice Shelf via the Scott-Amundsen South Pole Station. Expeditions 7's logistic plan included providing assistance to the Walking With The Wounded expedition, which was required at latitude 88°S. From the Ross Ice Shelf the Expeditions 7 team returned to Novolazarevskaya via the same route.
- 2014 – Turkish scientist Yakup Çelik became the first citizen representing Turkey to reach the South Pole.
- 2015–2016 – Luke Robertson (UK) becomes the first Scot – and the first person with an artificial pacemaker – to ski solo, unsupported (no resupply) and unassisted (no kiting) from the coast of Antarctica (Hercules Inlet) to the South Pole.
- 2015–2016 – Henry Worsley died while attempting to complete the first solo and unaided crossing of the Antarctic.
- 2016 – First Homeward Bound expedition, then the largest all-women expedition to Antarctica.
- 2016–2017 – Malgorzata Wojtaczka – 52 years old Polish, after 69 days completes solo-unaided-unsupported expedition from Hercules Inlet to the South Pole.
- 2016–2017 – Spear17, a six-man team from the British Army Reserves successfully completed a full traverse of Antarctica. They set off on 16 November from Hercules Inlet, arrived at the South Pole on Christmas Day, and completed a full traverse reaching Ross Ice Shelf on 20 January 2017. The aim of the expedition was to raise the profile of the army reservists, and to honour the memory of fellow explorer Henry Worsley. The team was led by Captain Louis Rudd, MBE
- 2016–2017 – Eric Philips (guide), Keith Tuffley and Rob Smith ski a new route to the South Pole from the Ross Ice Shelf through the Transantarctic Mountains following the Reedy Glacier. The expedition covers 605 km in 33 days setting off 8 December 2017 and arriving 10 January 2017.
- 2016–2017 – On 7 February Mike Horn completes first ever solo, unsupported north-to-south traverse of Antarctica from the Princess Astrid Coast (lat −70.1015 lon 9.8249) to the Dumont D'urville Station (lat −66.6833 lon 139.9167) via the South Pole. He arrived at the pole on 7 February 2017. A total distance of 5100 km was covered utilizing kites and skis in 57 days.
- 2016–2017 – Eric Philips (guide), Heath Jamieson (guide), Jade Hameister, Paul Hameister and Ming D'Arcy ski a new route to the South Pole from the Ross Ice Shelf through the Transantarctic Mountains following the Reedy Glacier then Kansas Glacier. The expedition covers 605 km in 33 days, setting off 6 December 2017 and arriving 11 January 2018.
- 2017–2018 – Astrid Forhold (Norway), supported by Jan Sverre Sivertsen, skies the longest part of the original Roald Amundsen route from Bay of Whales to the South Pole.
- 2018 – Colin O'Brady (USA) completed an unsupported (no resupplies or supply drops) solo crossing of Antarctica (not including the ice shelves). He started inland at the end of the Ronne Ice Shelf on 3 November 2018, passed through the South Pole and arrived inland at the start of the Ross Ice Shelf on 26 December 2018. Louis Rudd (UK), who started on the same day as Brady and took a similar route, completed his unsupported solo trek two days later, arriving at Ross Ice Shelf on 28 December 2018
- 2018–2019 – On 13 January, Matthieu Tordeur (France) becomes the first French and youngest in the world (27 years and 40 days) to ski solo, unsupported (no resupply) and unassisted (no kiting) from the coast of Antarctica (Hercules Inlet) to the South Pole.
- 2019 – SD 1020, an unmanned surface vehicle (USV) designed by British engineer Richard Jenkins of Saildrone, Inc. in Alameda, CA, completed the first autonomous circumnavigation of Antarctica, sailing 22,000 km (12,000 nmi) through the Southern Ocean in 196 days, from 19 January 2019 to 3 August 2019. The vehicle was deployed and retrieved from Bluff, New Zealand.
- 2019 – The first human-powered transit (by rowing) across the Drake Passage was accomplished on 25 December 2019, by captain Fiann Paul (Iceland), first mate Colin O'Brady (US), Andrew Towne (US), Cameron Bellamy (South Africa), Jamie Douglas-Hamilton (UK) and John Petersen (US).
- 2019–2020 – Anja Blacha completes the longest solo, unsupported, unassisted polar expedition by a woman, skiing from Berkner Island to the South Pole
- 2019-2020 Wendy Searle becomes the seventh woman to ski solo unsupported from the Hercules Inlet to the pole
- 2019–2020 – Mollie Hughes skied from Hercules Inlet to the pole, travelling 1,130 km (702 mi).
- 2019-2020 - Geoff Wilson using skiis and a snowkite completed a loop of 5,306 km from Thor's Hammer near Novolazarevskaya and returned to Novolazarevskaya being the first person to summit Dome Argus, the highest point on the Antarctic Plateau, solo and unsupported (Dome A, 80.3667oS, 77.3500E) (2019), becoming the first Australian to reach the Pole of Inaccessibility in Antarctica (2019) and setting the record for the longest solo unsupported crossing of Antarctica.
- 2021–2022 – Preet Chandi, a British Sikh army officer, became the first woman of colour to reach the south pole unassisted.

== Agreements ==
- 1959 – Antarctic Treaty System
- 1964 – Agreed Measures for the Conservation of Antarctic Fauna and Flora
- 1978 – Convention for the Conservation of Antarctic Seals
- 1982 – Convention for the Conservation of Antarctic Marine Living Resources
- 1988 – Convention on the Regulation of Antarctic Mineral Resource Activities
- 1998 – Protocol on Environmental Protection to the Antarctic Treaty

== See also ==
- European and American voyages of scientific exploration
- Farthest South
- Heroic Age of Antarctic Exploration
  - List of Antarctic exploration ships from the Heroic Age, 1897–1922
- History of Antarctica
- History of research ships
- List of Arctic expeditions
- List of polar explorers
- List of Russian explorers
- Research stations in Antarctica
