= List of Soviet Antarctic expeditions =

List of Antarctic expeditions by the Soviet Union is a list of expeditions from the Soviet Union to Antarctica.

== Expeditions ordered by date ==
Date	Expedition	Leader
1955–57	1st Soviet Antarctic Expedition	Mikhail Somov
1956–58	2nd Soviet Antarctic Expedition	Aleksei Treshnikov
1957–59	3rd Soviet Antarctic Expedition	Yevgeny Tolstikov
1958–60	4th Soviet Antarctic Expedition	Aleksandr Dralkin
1959–61	5th Soviet Antarctic Expedition	Yevgeny Korotkevich
1960–62	6th Soviet Antarctic Expedition	Valentin Driatsky
1961–63	7th Soviet Antarctic Expedition	Aleksandr Dralkin
1962–64	8th Soviet Antarctic Expedition	Mikhail Somov
1963–65	9th Soviet Antarctic Expedition	Mikhail Somov
1964–66	10th Soviet Antarctic Expedition	Mikhail Ostrekin, I.G.Petrov
1965–67	11th Soviet Antarctic Expedition	Dmitri Maksutov, Leonid Dubrovin
1966–68	12th Soviet Antarctic Expedition	Pavel Senko and Vladislav Gerbovich
1967–69	13th Soviet Antarctic Expedition	Aleksei Treshnikov
1968–70	14th Soviet Antarctic Expedition	D.D.Maksutov, Ernst Krenkel
1969–71	15th Soviet Antarctic Expedition	Pavel Senko and Vladislav Gerbovich
1970–72	16th Soviet Antarctic Expedition	I.G.Petrov and Yury Tarbeyev
1971–73	17th Soviet Antarctic Expedition	Yevgeny Korotkevich, V.G.Averyanov
1972–74	18th Soviet Antarctic Expedition	Pavel Senko
1973–75	19th Soviet Antarctic Expedition	D.D.Maksutov, V.S.Ignatov
1974–76	20th Soviet Antarctic Expedition	V.I.Serdyukov, N.A.Kornilov
1975–77	21st Soviet Antarctic Expedition	O.K.Sedov, G.I.Bardin
1976–78	22nd Soviet Antarctic Expedition	Nikolai Tyabin, Leonid Dubrovin
1977–79	23rd Soviet Antarctic Expedition	V.I.Serdyukov, O.K.Sedov
1978–80	24th Soviet Antarctic Expedition	A.N.Artemyev, O.K.Sedov
1979–80	25th Soviet Antarctic Expedition	N.A.Kornilov, N.I.Tyabin
1980–82	26th Soviet Antarctic Expedition	V.I.Serdyukov, V.A.Shamontyev
1981–83	27th Soviet Antarctic Expedition	D.D.Maksutov, R.M.Galkin
1982–84	28th Soviet Antarctic Expedition	N.A.Kornilov, A.N.Artemyev
1983–85	29th Soviet Antarctic Expedition	N.I.Tyabin, L.V.Bulatov
1984–86	30th Soviet Antarctic Expedition	D.D.Maksutov, R.M.Galkin
1985–87	31st Soviet Antarctic Expedition	N.I.Tyabin, V.F.Dubovtsev
1986–88	32nd Soviet Antarctic Expedition	V.D.Klokov, V.Ya.Vovk
1987–89	33rd Soviet Antarctic Expedition	N.A.Kornilov, Yu.A.Khabarov
1988–90	34th Soviet Antarctic Expedition	S.M.Pryamikov, L.V.Bulatov
1989–91	35th Soviet Antarctic Expedition	V.M.Piguzov
1991–92	36th Soviet Antarctic Expedition	Lev Savatyugin

== See also ==
- Soviet Antarctic Expedition
- List of Antarctic expeditions
- List of Russian explorers
