= Soviet Plateau =

Plateau in Antarctica

Soviet Plateau (highlighted in green).

The Soviet Plateau (Russian: Советское плато) is the highest part of the glacial cover of East Antarctica, located within 75–84° south latitude and 25–105° east longitude. According to the Atlas of the Antarctic (1966, p. XX), the central point of the Soviet plateau has coordinates 80°0′S 85°00′E.

The plateau has a length of 2,000 km, and a width of roughly 450 km. The height on the outskirts is approximately 3,500 m, increasing to around 4,004 m in the central region where the Gamburtsev Subglacial Mountains are located. The ice cover has a thickness of 750 to 3,800 m. The average annual air temperature is below -56 °C; On July 21, 1983, -89.2 °C (-128.56 °F) was recorded at Vostok Station, making it the lowest temperature on Earth ever recorded. At the same time, the temperature on the glacier bed is around 0 °C and the lakes are formed under the ice. The largest of these known lakes was found in the area of the Vostok station (Lake Vostok). Soviet expeditions conducted pioneer plateau research in the years 1957–1959.
