= Paragliding in Azerbaijan =

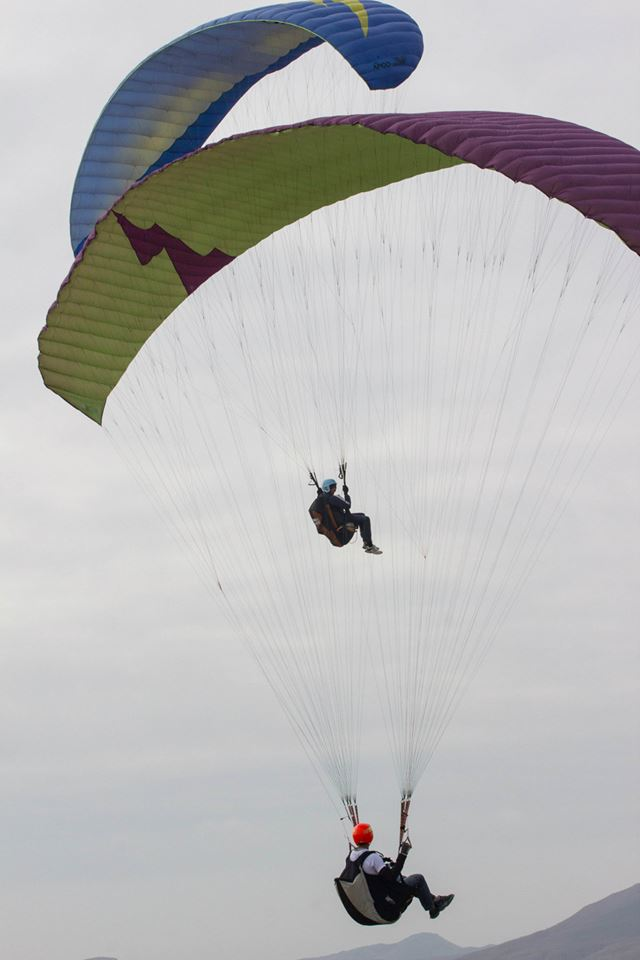
- Stephen Charlton and Ziya Qasimov soaring over the hills.
- Highest governing body: Fédération Aéronautique Internationale
- First played: RockStone club
- Registered players: Azerbaijan

Characteristics
- Contact: No
- Mixed-sex: Yes, separate competitions
- Type: Individual sport, Air sport, Paragliding
- Venue: Outdoor

Presence
- Olympic: Never included. Was nominated as discipline in the Islamic Solidarity Games

Paragliding in Azerbaijan is quite young and even though Azerbaijan has a rich sporting heritage, little was known about the sport of paragliding and air sport, generally, at the beginning of the century. Early in the sports development some ex-parachute jumpers and short-term foreign visitors were trying to develop the sport, but with no real success. As of 2015, the community consisted of about 20 pilots, they were members of the sporting clubs RockStone, Gilavar, Climb Club, and CanFly. Pilots are required to follow Fédération Aéronautique Internationale main safety requirements and ethics.

== History ==
One of Azerbaijan's first paragliding pilots was Huseyngulu Baghirov. Baghirov imported all the necessary equipment into the country, mostly powered paragliding, and found an experienced trainer from abroad.

Baghirov then founded the Air and Extreme Sports Federation (FAIREX) to develop mountaineering and air sports in the country. In July 2013, with FAIREX support, Azerbaijan became the home country to the first International Paragliding Festival in the Caucasus. The participants in the festival, apart from Azerbaijani pilots, were guests from the Netherlands, Georgia, South Africa and Belgium.
