= Norwegian Antarctic Expedition =

There have been several Norwegian Antarctic expeditions:

- Jason Expeditions (1892–1894), led by Carl Anton Larsen
- Antarctic Expedition (1894–1895), led by Henrik Johan Bull
- Amundsen's South Pole expedition (1910–1912)
- Norvegia Expeditions (1927–1931), sponsored by Lars Christensen
- Thorshavn Expeditions, 1931–1937, sponsored by Lars Christensen
- Brategg Expedition (1948); see Peter I Island
- Norwegian–British–Swedish Antarctic Expedition, 1949–1952
- Sixth Norwegian Antarctic Expedition (1956–1960) (NAX)
- Norwegian-U.S. Scientific Traverse of East Antarctica, 2007–2008
