= Vetrov =

Vetrov (Russian: Ветров, from ветер meaning wind) is a Russian masculine surname, its feminine counterpart is Vetrova. It may refer to

- Gennady Vetrov (born 1958), Soviet and Russian satirist and humorist
- Vera Ulyakina-Vetrova (born 1986) is a Russian volleyball player
- Vladimir Vetrov (1932–1985), Soviet KGB spy
- Vladislav Vetrov (born 1964), Soviet and Russian theater and film actor

== See also ==
- Vetrov Hill, hill in Antarctica
