= Lena Passage =

Marine passage between Haswell Islands and Vetrov Hill

Lena Passage (66°34′S 92°58′E) is a passage 0.5 nautical miles (1 km) wide between the southwestern part of the Haswell Islands and Vetrov Hill on the coast of Antarctica. It was mapped by the 2nd Soviet Antarctic Expedition in 1956, who named it for the ship Lena.
