= Treshnikov =

Treshnikov may refer to:

- 3339 Treshnikov, a minor planet
- Alexey Tryoshnikov (1914–1991), cited as A. F. Treshnikov, Russian oceanologist and polar explorer, after whom the planet was named
