= Leonid Kolotilo =

- Леонид Колотило
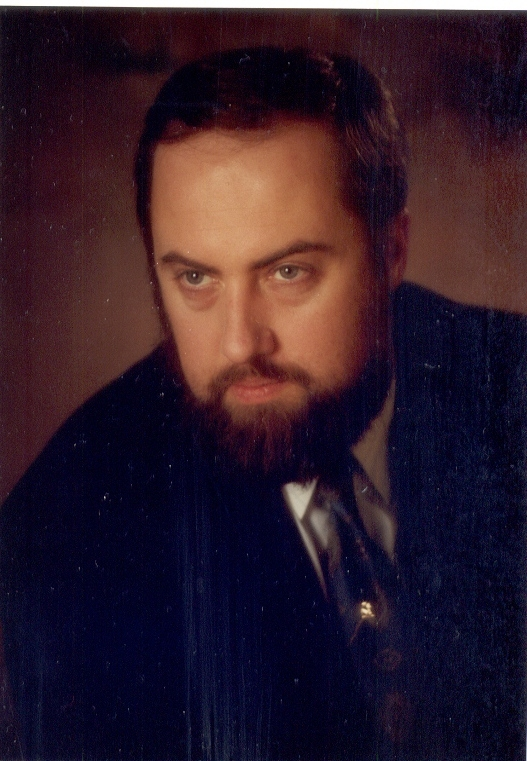
- Born: 16 December 1958 (age 67); Leningrad, Soviet Union
- Education: Moscow State University
- Scientific career
- Fields: Geography, Geophysics, Hydrography, Cartography
- Workplaces: Russian Geographical Society
- Academic advisors: Yuri Tarasyuk; Kirill Kondratyev

Leonid Grigorievich Kolotilo (Russian: Леони́д Григо́рьевич Колоти́ло; born December 16, 1958, Leningrad) is a Soviet and Russian geographer, researcher of Lake Baikal, a full member of Academic Senate Russian Geographical Society, Captain 3rd Rank (1989).

Author of over 100 scientific publications.

== D-SELF ==
Author of the theory of self-organization and self-regulation of natural systems D-SELF along with the other authors

In 1987, an initiative group of scientists engaged in interdisciplinary research of open dynamical systems. At first, the group consisted of four people: G.M. Degtyarev, A.G. Ivanov-Rostovtsev, L.G. Kolotilo and O.A. Lyubchenko. Several dozen specialists from various fields of natural sciences and humanities joined the work in different periods. The SELF model with applications was published in a series of articles of DAN, presented by academicians of the Russian Academy of Sciences: A.F. Treshnikov, V.I. Ilyichev, K.Ya. Kondratiev, N.S. Solomenko, E.I. Shemyakin, S.L. Solovyov and others. Corresponding members of the Russian Academy of Sciences S.P. Kurdyumov, L.N. Rykunov and other scientists also participated in the D–SELF project. Expanded versions of the DAN articles have been published in various academic and applied publications. Some of these works have been translated into English and published abroad.

D-SELF is a scientific field of interdisciplinary research of systems of various nature in self-organization and self–regulation. D-SELF is the initial abbreviation for a Double (dual) general process combining SELF-organization and SELF-regulation.

The name D-SELF was proposed by A.G. Ivanov-Rostovtsev and L.G. Kolotilo in 1989 and first appeared in the collection of scientific articles of the Pulkovo Observatory (Saint-Petersburg). The name D-SELF is an abbreviation of the first letter of the word Double (dual), which refers to two processes whose names begin with the word SELF: SELF-organization and SELF-regulation.

== Awards ==
- Jubilee Medal "300 Years of the Russian Navy"
- Medal "In Commemoration of the 300th Anniversary of Saint Petersburg"
- Jubilee Medal "70 Years of the Armed Forces of the USSR"
- Medal "For Impeccable Service"
