= Kharkovchanka =

Antarctic off-road vehicle

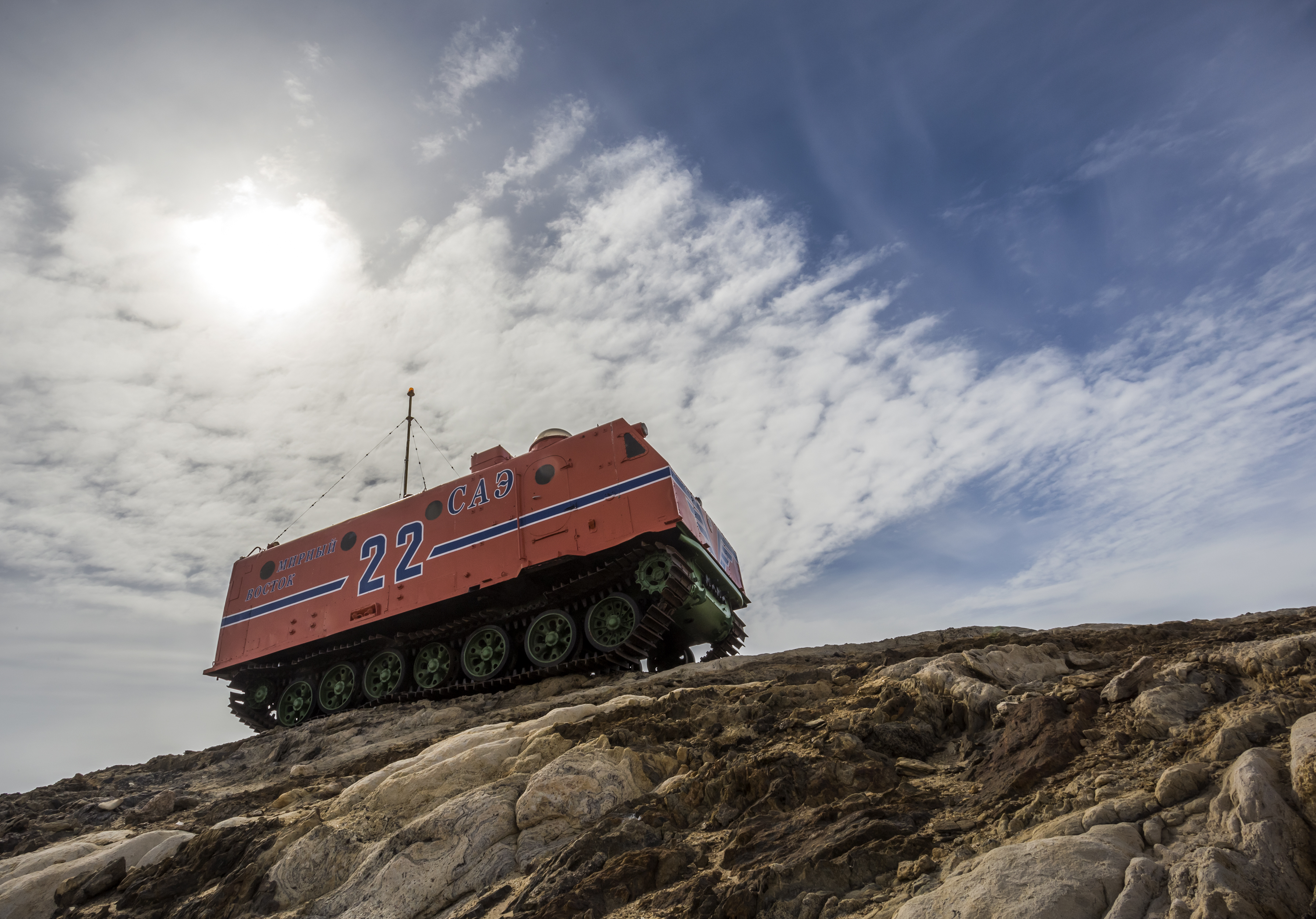
Kharkovchanka close to the Zhongshan Station in Antarctica (2014)

Kharkovchanka (Russian: Харьковчанка) or Kharkivyanka (Ukrainian: Харків'янка, "Woman of Kharkiv"), code name: Manufacture 404S, is a model of Antarctic off-road vehicle made circa 1957–1958 in the Soviet Union, designed and built by the Kharkov Transport Engineering Plant, Ukraine and later manufactured in Kharkiv by the Malyshev Factory. Based on the AT-T tractor platform (itself based on the T-54 tank). In December 1959 two of them ("21" and "23") were delivered to Antarctica and reached the South Pole. The massive off-road snow vehicle had a small galley, toilet, oven, and a total of eight beds.

By the 39th Russian Antarctic expedition, Vityaz DT-30Ps replaced the Kharkovchankas. Those were themselves later replaced by PistenBully 300 Polar vehicles.

== History ==
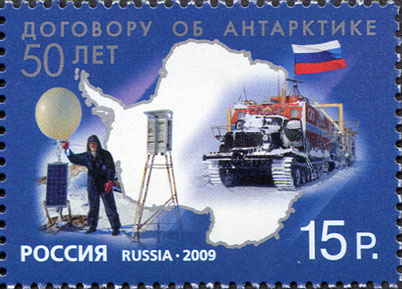
The second generation of Kharkovchanka.

Three Kharkovchankas were built in 1958, and shipped to Antarctica. They traversed from the ocean coast to the existing Soviet Vostok Station in February 1959. Two of these, and a third AT-T tractor, left Vostok station for the geographic South Pole in early December 1959, arriving at the pole on 26 December 1959, and surprising the US crew that had been airlifted into the Amundsen–Scott Station the previous summer. Dozens of more exploratory missions into Antarctica were made with Kharkovchankas in subsequent years.

In 1974–1975, a second generation Kharkovchanka was designed and built for Antarctic service. The largest design difference was the movement of the cab and engine back out in front of the main massive rectangular body structure, as well as the addition of auxiliary power generation for electricity and heat when the main engine was not operating. Three second generation Kharkovchankas came off the production line in the fall of 1975.

A potential third generation based on the MT-T tractor was considered in the 1980s, but was put on permanent hold for budgetary reasons, and following the Dissolution of the Soviet Union, left the Kharkovchankas as the main transportation system for Antarctic cargo into the early 2010s as part of the Russian Antarctic operation.

== Description ==
=== First generation ===
Like the Antarctic Snow Cruiser, the engine was inside the 20 m^{2} (220 sq ft) living space to allow maintenance without being exposed to the elements. However, this meant that the noise of the engine prevented any sleep and that everything was covered by soot from the exhaust fumes.

== Technical characteristics ==
=== First generation ===
- Assembly: Kharkiv (Kharkov Transport Engineering Plant), Ukrainian SSR
- Manufacturer: Malyshev Factory
- Length: 8.5 m (27 ft 11 in)
- Width: 3.5 m (11 ft 6 in)
- Height: 4 m (13 ft 1 in)
- Wheels: 7 each side with drive sprocket and idler
- Track width: 1 m (3 ft 3 in)
- Suspension: Torsion bar
- Engine: 995 hp (742 kW) V-12 diesel
- Cruise speed: 30 km/h (19 mph)
- Max. speed: 56 km/h (35 mph)
- Max. grade: 30 degrees slope
- Weight: 35,000 kg (34 long tons)
- Tow load: 60 tonnes

== See also ==
- Antarctic Snow Cruiser, US vehicle, circa 1940, unsuccessful.
