= Luncke expedition =

1957–1958 Norwegian Antarctic expedition

Luncke expedition (1957–1958) was an Antarctica expedition with a team led by the Norwegian Bernhard Luncke and based at Norway Station. The team conducted observations in meteorology, atmospheric science and glaciology. Extensive aerial photography was carried out and the resulting maps were published by the Norwegian Polar Institute. These findings are still used in some maps.

== See also ==
- List of Antarctic expeditions
