= Akademik Tryoshnikov =

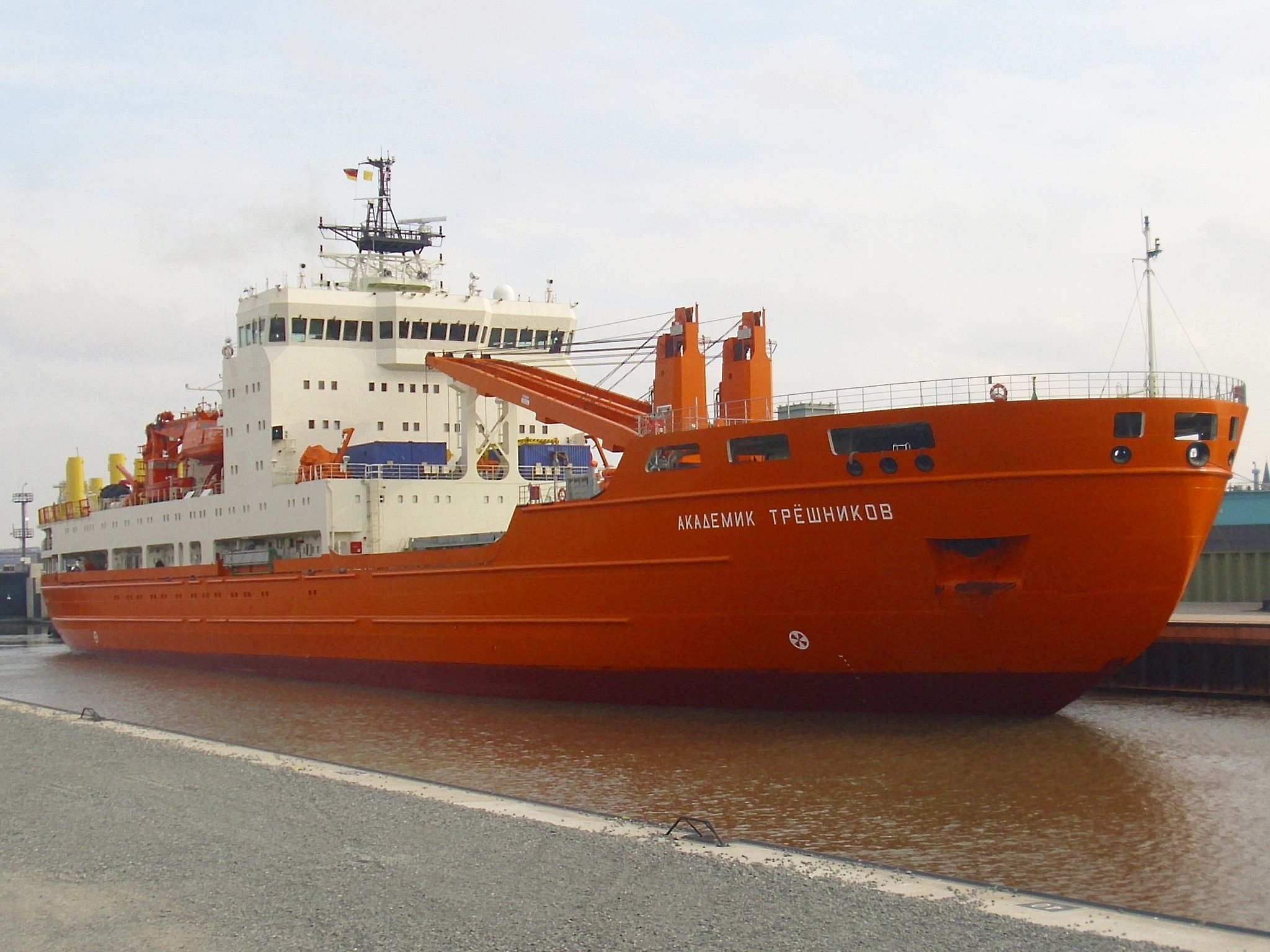
- Akademik Tryoshnikov in Bremerhaven, Germany

History

Russia
- Name: Akademik Tryoshnikov
- Namesake: Alexey Tryoshnikov
- Owner: Arctic and Antarctic Research Institute
- Port of registry: Saint Petersburg, Russia
- Ordered: January 2008
- Builder: Admiralty Shipyard (Saint Petersburg, Russia)
- Yard number: 02440
- Laid down: 30 July 2009
- Launched: 29 March 2011
- Sponsored by: Tatyana Nesterenko
- Completed: 15 December 2012
- Identification: IMO number: 9548536; Call sign: UBXH3; MMSI number: 273359440
- Status: In service

General characteristics
- Class & type: Research ship
- Tonnage: 12,711 GT; 12,000 DWT
- Displacement: 16,539 t (16,278 long tons)
- Length: 133.53 m (438 ft 1 in)
- Beam: 23.25 m (76 ft 3 in)
- Draught: 8.50 m (27 ft 11 in)
- Ice class: RS Arc7
- Installed power: 2 × Wärtsilä 9L38B (2 × 6,525 kW); 1 × Wärtsilä 6L38B (1 × 6,350 kW)
- Propulsion: Diesel-electric; two shafts (2 × 7,000 kW)
- Speed: 16 knots (30 km/h; 18 mph); 2 knots (3.7 km/h; 2.3 mph) in 1.1 m (3.6 ft) ice
- Range: 15,000 nautical miles (28,000 km; 17,000 mi)
- Endurance: 45 days
- Capacity: 80 special personnel
- Crew: 60
- Aircraft carried: Two Ka -32 helicopters

Akademik Tryoshnikov (Russian: Академик Трёшников) is a Russian scientific diesel-electric research vessel, the flagship of the Russian polar research fleet.

== History ==
The vessel was constructed under state order. The project was developed by Krylov Shipbuilding Research Institute with Baltsudoproekt Bureau. The chief designer of the project was Yevgueny S. Bylinovich, deputy chief designer was Mikhail Rudenko.

The creation of the vessel became an event for the Russian Polar science since the previous research vessel had been put into operation 25 years ago.

The ship is named in honor of Alexey Tryoshnikov, the president of the Geographical Society of the USSR since 1977.

In October 2016, the ship was used to test towing icebergs in the Kara Sea.

Between December 2016 and March 2017, the Akademik Tryoshnikov was used for the Antarctic Circumnavigation Expedition (ACE) during the Southern Hemisphere summer.

In 2019-2020, the Akademik Tryoshnikov was supporting the MOSAiC Expedition.

== Gallery ==
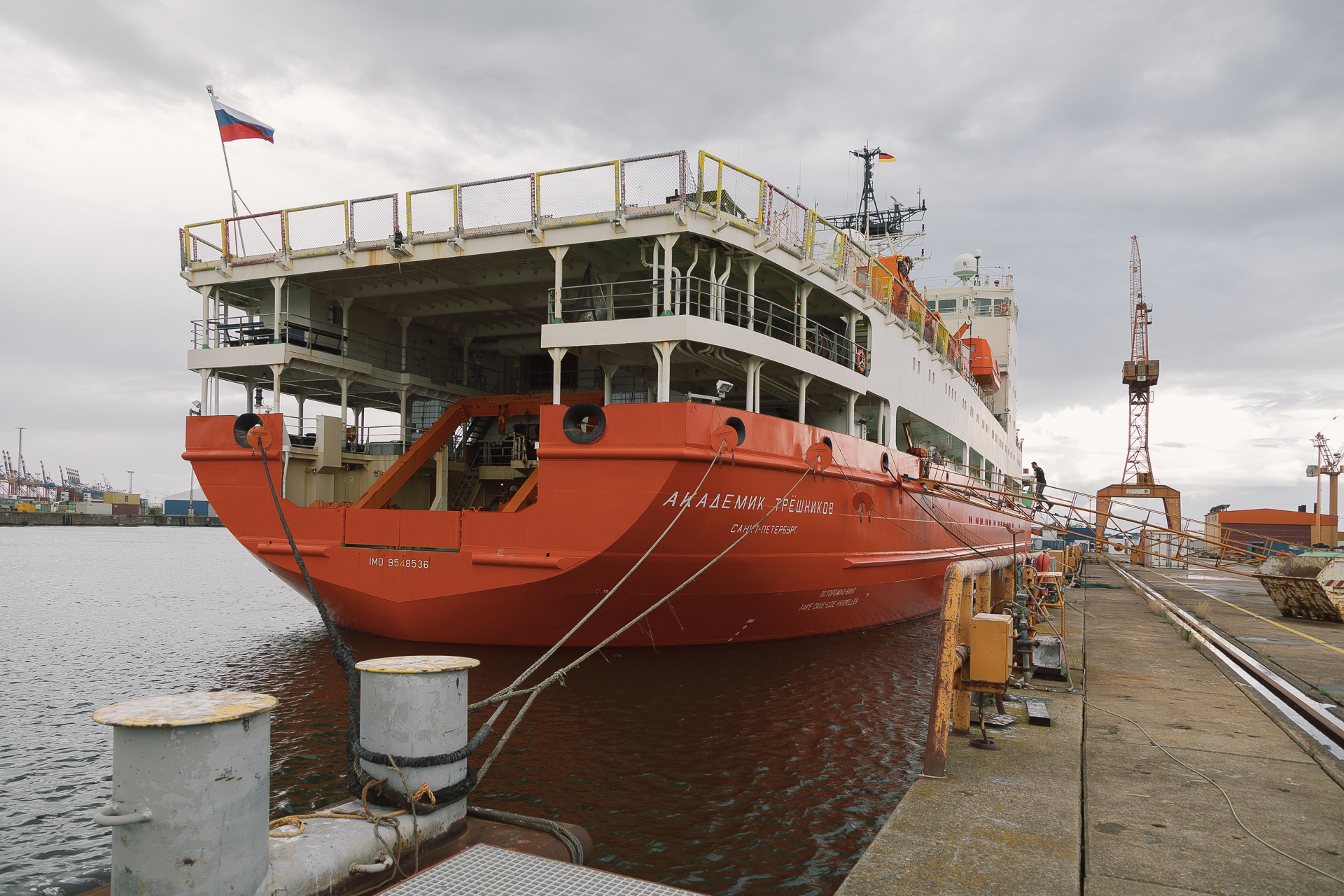
Akademik Tryoshnikov in the port of Bremerhaven during MOSAiC expedition
