= Australian National Antarctic Research Expeditions =

Research expedition

The Australian National Antarctic Research Expeditions (ANARE /ænˈɑːri/ ann-AR-ee) is the historical name for the Australian Antarctic Program (AAP) administered for Australia by the Australian Antarctic Division (AAD).

== History ==
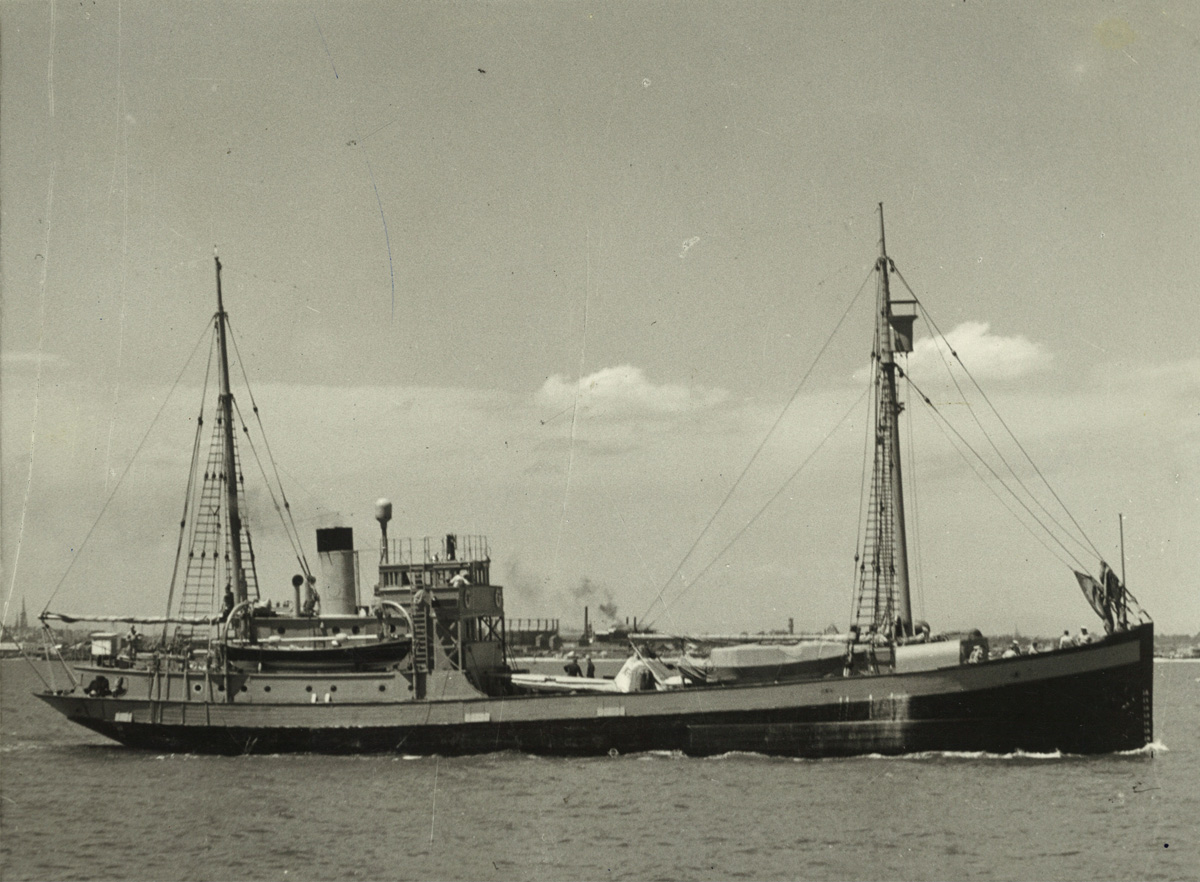
HMAS Wyatt Earp leaving Williamstown, Victoria, 19 December 1947. This voyage would be the first to operate under the banner of the Australian National Antarctic Research Expedition (ANARE).

Australia has had a long involvement in south polar regions since as early as Douglas Mawson's Australasian Antarctic Expedition in 1911. Further Australian exploration of the Antarctic continent was conducted during the British Australian and New Zealand Antarctic Research Expedition (BANZARE), which was conducted over the years 1929–1931.

The Australian National Antarctic Research Expeditions were established in 1947 with expeditions to Macquarie Island and Heard Island. In 1948 the Australian Antarctic Division (AAD) was established to administer the expedition program.

== ANARE Name ==
The name ANARE fell out of official use in the early 2000s. However current and former Australian Antarctic expeditioners continue to use the term informally as a means of identification with the long and continuous history of Australian expeditions to Antarctica.

== ANARE Symbols ==
Pennant of the Australian National Antarctic Research Expeditions using the historic leopard seal logo.

Soon after being appointed Antarctic Division director in 1949, Dr. Phillip Law saw the need for a recognisable symbol for the fledgling ANARE. His wife, Nel, was an artist and produced the distinctive and enduring circular emblem that Dr Law described as "...a circular badge whose centre is the Antarctic Continent with the Australian sector shaded. Surrounding this is an annular set of designs depicting flora and fauna of Antarctica and the Sub-Antarctic Islands".

The main ANARE emblem was, in Dr Law's words, "too complex to reproduce as a lapel badge or as a logo on aircraft, vehicles or flags." Dr Law saw potential in the leopard seal as a simplified ANARE symbol. "I was struck with the possibility of formalising a sketch of the creature to produce a geometrical pattern of straight lines....I drew it in the national colours of gold and green." That symbol served until 1985, when a new 'globe' logo based on the Australian and Antarctic continents was developed by the AAD.

At the same time the term ANARE fell out of official use the 'globe' logo was also discarded in favour of the Australian coat of arms to bring the livery of the AAD in line with the rest of the Australian Public Service. However like the ANARE name the logo continues to be used on an informal basis by expeditioners each year in the production of Antarctic Station badges, T-shirts and other memorabilia.

== ANARE Club ==
The ANARE Club is a membership organisation established in 1951 for current and previous members of Australian Antarctic expeditions. Its headquarters are in Melbourne, Australia, with branches in most Australian capital cities. Full Membership is open to anyone who has travelled to Antarctic or subantarctic regions with the Australian Antarctic Program, and subscriber membership is open to anyone who has an interest in Antarctica. Its emblem is the emperor penguin on a map of Antarctica.

A similar organisation is the Antarctic Family and Friends Association, originally established in 1965 by Nel Law as the Antarctic Wives' Association of Australia.

== References to ANARE ==
Anare Street in the Aurora Village in Greenwith, South Australia is named after the expeditions. Nearby streets also share similarly themed names.

== See also ==
- List of Antarctic expeditions
- Vostok traverse
