= Adams Island (Antarctica) =

Island in Queen Mary Land, Antarctica

- Location within Antarctica

Geography
- Location: Antarctica
- Coordinates: 66°33′S 092°35′E

Administration
- Administered under the Antarctic Treaty System

Demographics
- Population: Uninhabited

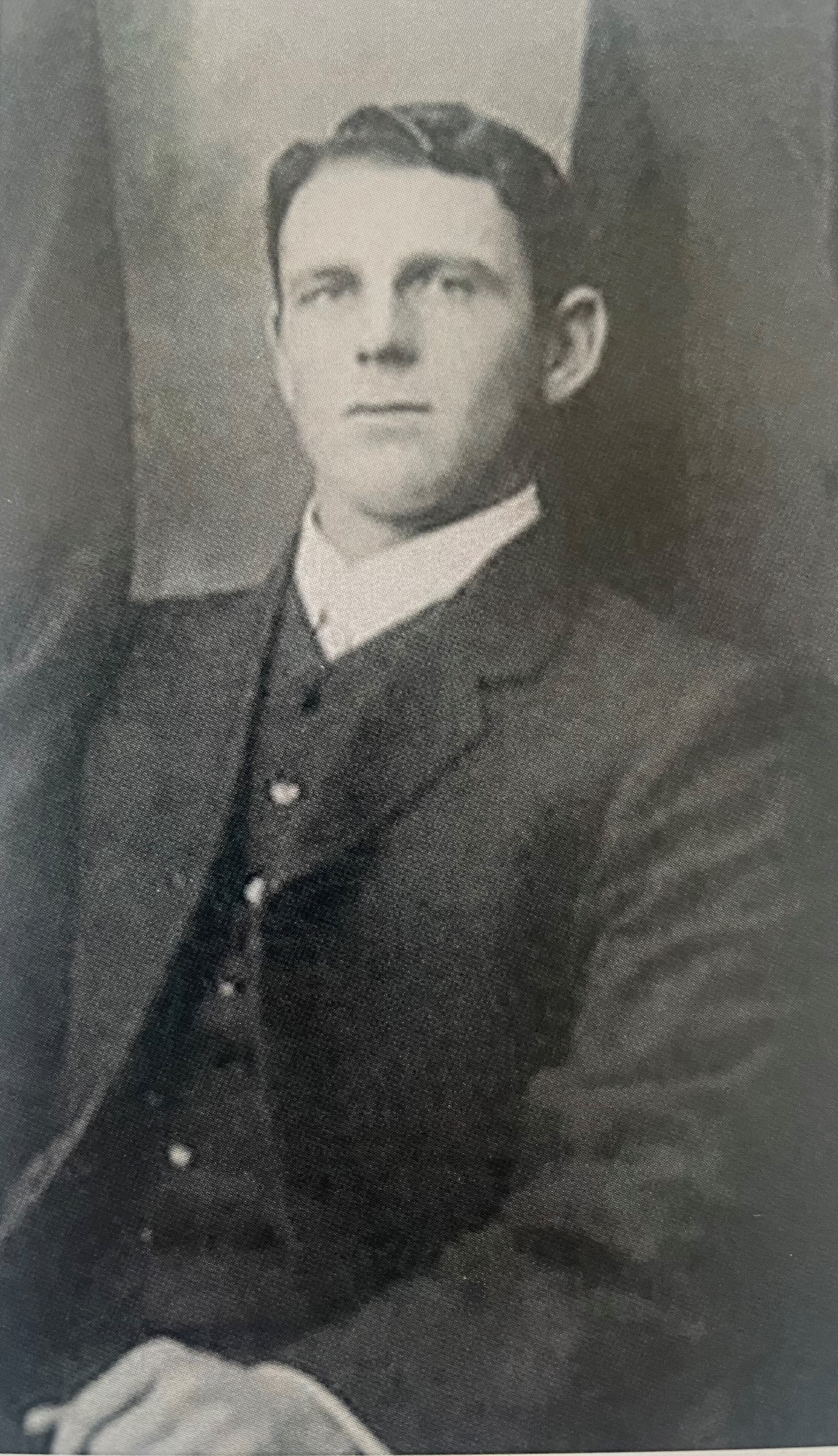
Edgar Lucas Adams

Adams Island is a small rocky coastal antarctic island embedded in thick bay ice most of the year, lying at the western side of McDonald Bay, about 20.4 km (11 nmi) west of Mabus Point. Adams Island was named after Edgar Lucas Adams (1883 - 1928), the boatswain of the expedition ship, Aurora. The island was discovered by the Western Base Party of the Australian Antarctic Expedition, 1911–1914, under Douglas Mawson, and named by him for the boatswain of the expedition ship Aurora.

== See also ==
- Composite Antarctic Gazetteer
- List of Antarctic and subantarctic islands
- SCAR
- Territorial claims in Antarctica
