= Azerbaijan Scientific Expedition =

Azerbaijan Scientific Expedition was a two-man expedition to Antarctica organized by the Azerbaijani government to reach the top of Vinson Massif and the South Pole by skiing and walking.

Huseyngulu Baghirov, Ecology and Natural Resources Minister, and Tarlan Ramazanov set off from home on 24 December 2008, reaching Mount Vinson on 11 January 2009 and the South Pole on 26 January 2009. They planted the flag of Azerbaijan and left behind a bronze plate in each spot. They became the first Muslims and Turks to reach the South Pole on foot.

The team collected samples for geological research by the Azerbaijan National Academy of Sciences and made numerous observations of meteorological patterns.
