= Kirill Kondratyev =

Russian atmospheric physicist

Kirill Yakovlevich Kondratyev (Russian: Кирилл Яковлевич Кондратьев; 14 June 1920 – 1 May 2006) was a Soviet and Russian atmospheric physicist.

== Early life and education ==
Kirill Yakovlevich Kondratyev was born on 14 June 1920 in Rybinsk.

He went to school in Leningrad and in 1938 entered the University of Leningrad to study physics, mathematics, and chemistry.

In 1941, he joined the Russian army and fought in the siege of Leningrad. He graduated in atmospheric physics in 1946.

== Career ==
After graduating, Kondratyev was made an assistant professor in the Faculty of Physics.

He later held the posts of lecturer, research scientist, professor of atmospheric physics, chief of the Department of Atmospheric Physics, University Vice-Rector and Rector. From 1958-61 he was Head of the Department of Radiation Studies at the Main Geophysical Observatory.

He was a staff member of the Institute for Lake Research and the Research Centre for Ecological Safety, and also helped to create the Nansen International Environmental and Remote Sensing Centre.

=== Research ===
During 1970-75, Kondratyev was a leading researcher in the Complex Atmospheric Energetic Experiment (CAENEX) project, the object of which was to study the transport of all categories of energy and all types of flux heat divergence in the atmosphere. Along with determining the shortwave(IR) absorption of atmospheric aerosols.

Kondratyev served as a member of the International Programme Committee for the World Conference on Climate Change, held in Moscow in 2003, where he presented a paper entitled "Uncertainties of Global Climate Change Observations and Simulation Modeling." He expressed skepticism about global warming.

=== D-SELF ===
Kondratyev supported a new scientific direction — the theory of self-organization and self-regulation of natural systems D-SELF

In 1987, an initiative group of scientists engaged in interdisciplinary research of open dynamical systems. At first, the group consisted of four people: G.M. Degtyarev, A.G. Ivanov-Rostovtsev, L.G. Kolotilo and O.A. Lyubchenko. Several dozen specialists from various fields of natural sciences and humanities joined the work in different periods. The SELF model with applications was published in a series of articles of DAN, presented by academicians of the Russian Academy of Sciences: A.F. Treshnikov, V.I. Ilyichev, K.Ya. Kondratiev, N.S. Solomenko, E.I. Shemyakin, S.L. Solovyov and others. Corresponding members of the Russian Academy of Sciences S.P. Kurdyumov, L.N. Rykunov and other scientists also participated in the D–SELF project. Expanded versions of the DAN articles have been published in various academic and applied publications. Some of these works have been translated into English and published abroad.

D-SELF is a scientific field of interdisciplinary research of systems of various nature in self-organization and self–regulation. D-SELF is the initial abbreviation for a Double (dual) general process combining SELF-organization and SELF-regulation.

The name D-SELF was proposed by A.G. Ivanov-Rostovtsev and L.G. Kolotilo in 1989 and first appeared in the collection of scientific articles of the Pulkovo Observatory (Saint-Petersburg). The name D-SELF is an abbreviation of the first letter of the word Double (dual), which refers to two processes whose names begin with the word SELF: SELF-organization and SELF-regulation.

== Other activities ==
Kondratyev was editorial advisor to Proceedings of the Russian Geographic Society (Russia), Idojaras (Hungary), Meteorology and Atmospheric Physics (Austria), Atmosfera (Mexico), Il Nuovo Cimento C (Italy), and Sustainable Development (USA).

== Recognition and awards ==
Kondratyev was a member of the Academy of Sciences of the Soviet Union and Russian Academy of Sciences, the International Academy of Astronautics, the German National Academy of Sciences Leopoldina (1970), the American Meteorological Society and the Royal Meteorological Society.

He received honorary doctorates from the Universities of Lille (France), Athens (Greece) and Budapest (Hungary).

His prizes include the USSR State Prize and the twelfth International Meteorological Organization Prize.

== Death and legacy ==
Kondratyev died on 1 May 2006.
