= 5th Soviet Antarctic Expedition =

The Fifth Soviet Antarctic Expedition (1959–1961) was an expedition in Antarctica led by Yevgeny Sergeyevich Korotkevich.

The ship RV Ob arrived on 19 December 1959, bringing in both the Lazarev group of ten people under L. Dubrovin and the 50 members of the Fifth Soviet Antarctic Expedition with their leader, Korotkevich, for work in Queen Maud Land. Günter Skeib, one of the member of this expedition, has written a book about his exploration titled Hurricanes over the Antarctic, in which he wrote that "for 13 months [they] were the prisoners of the Antarctic."

Preceded by Fourth	Soviet Antarctic expeditions	Succeeded by Sixth
