= Ministry of Transport Machine-Building Industry =

Government ministry of the Soviet Union

The Ministry of Transport Machine-Building Industry (Russian: Министерство транспортного машиностроения СССР) was one of the government ministries of the Soviet Union. Before 1946 it was known as the People's Commissariat of the Tank Industry of the USSR (Народный комиссариат танковой промышленности СССР).

The seat was located in Moscow at Ryazanskaya St. (Рязанская ул.) 8а, then evacuated to Chelyabinsk.

== History ==
The People's Commissariat of the Tank Industry was created 11 September 1941 on the basis of People's Commissariat of Middle Engineering Industry in conjunction with those of large losses of tanks in World War II. Similar commissariats existed at that time in other areas of the defense industry, such as aviation and NKTP was organized similarly.

NKTP became one of the largest industrial ministries of the USSR. It consisted of a series of industrial giants, employing over 10,000 people each. In total, during the war in his factories employed thousands 200,000 – 250,000 people.

At the end of 1941, NKTP forming process has been completed.

In the first stage the main task was the sharp rise NKTP production of tanks.

During 1942 a significant reduction in the complexity of the production T-34. In this way, Works No. 183, it declined by 22%, while Works No. 112 – 40%.

Great importance for the development of the production of tanks were also changes in their structure. However, to simplify design and production process led to a decrease in reliability, so in the summer of 1942, major efforts were directed NKTP designers to simplify the production technology to improve the reliability of the tanks.

Activities NKTP in the initial period of war (1941–1942) can be described as a success story of Soviet production of tanks, which in quantitative terms, grew much faster than the production of tanks in Germany and occupied countries. Thus, in the Soviet Union in 1942 produced 24,504 tanks and self-propelled guns in Germany — only 6,189 in 1943 – 24,006 (10,700 in Germany.) In 1944 – 28,983 (18,300 in Germany), in the first half of 1945 – 15,422 (Germany only 4,400).

October 14, 1945 the People's Commissariat of the Tank Industry of the USSR was renamed the People's Commissariat of Transport Machine-Building Industry of the USSR (Народный комиссариат транспортного машиностроения СССР). From 1946 – Ministry of Transport Machine-Building Industry of the USSR.

== Factories under the ministry ==
The company incorporated NKTP with experience in the production of tanks since 1930:

- Kharkov – Works No. 183 → V.A. Malyshev Kharkov Institute of Transport Machine-Building Industry (Харьковский завод транспортного машиностроения имени В. А. Малышева), producing medium tanks T-34. This facility was also sometimes called the Kharkov Transport Engineering Plant, and was one of two plants building the Kharkovchanka Antarctic Cruisers after the mid-1950s.
- Stalingrad – Works No. 75 → Barrikady Works (завод Баррикады), which produces diesel engines for tanks
- Leningrad – Kirov Works, heavy tanks and plant No. 174 → K. E. Voroshilov Leningrad State Works No. 174 (Ленинградский государственный завод № 174 имени К. Е. Ворошилова), light tanks T-26
- Moscow – the plant is 37, a light flying T-40 tanks
- Mariupol – Ilyich Mariupol Works (Мариупольский завод им. Ильича), housings for the T-34
- Podolsk – Ordzhonikidze Podolsk Works (Подольский завод им. Орджоникидзе), armored hulls for tanks T-40

Since the beginning of September 1941 the majority of plants being taken over by the Germans, while the composition of NKTP includes businesses located in the eastern regions of the USSR. They evacuated facilities, such as

- Kirov Works took Chelyabinsk Tractor Plant (Челябинский тракторный завод),
- Works No. 183 – Ural Car Building Works (Уральский вагоностроительный завод) in Nizhny Tagil,
- Department of the Kirov Engine Works – Ural Turbine Works (Уральский турбинный завод) in Sverdlovsk,
- Izhorsk Works (Ижорский завод) – Ural Works of Heavy Engineering Industry (Уральский завод тяжёлого машиностроения) in Sverdlovsk,
- Works No. 75 – Yurginsk Works of Machine Industry (Юргинский машиностроительный завод).

Moreover, the composition became NKTP

- Works No. 264 → Stalingrad Shipyard (Сталинградская судоверфь) in Stalingrad, organizing the production of armored hulls for STZ,
- Works No. 112 → Shipyard (Красное Сормово) in Nizhny Novgorod, which focuses on the production of T-34.

== List of ministers ==
- Vyacheslav Malyshev (1.9.1941 - 29.12.1947)
- Ivan Nosenko (29.12.1947 - 10.1.1950)
- Yuri Maksarev (10.1.1950 - 6.3.1953)
- Sergei Stepanov (19.4.1954 - 10.5.1957)
