= Lednikov Bay =

Body of water in Queen Mary Land, Antarctica

- Coordinates: 66°34′S 92°22′E

Lednikov Bay is a small bay just west of McDonald Bay on the coast of Antarctica. The bay was mapped in 1955 from aerial photos taken by U.S. Navy Operation Highjump, 1946–47. It was remapped by the 2nd Soviet Antarctic Expedition in 1956 and named "Bukhta Lednikovaya" (glacier bay), probably because of its location at the terminus of a small glacier.
