= Antarctic Snow Cruiser =

Vehicle intended to facilitate transport in Antarctica

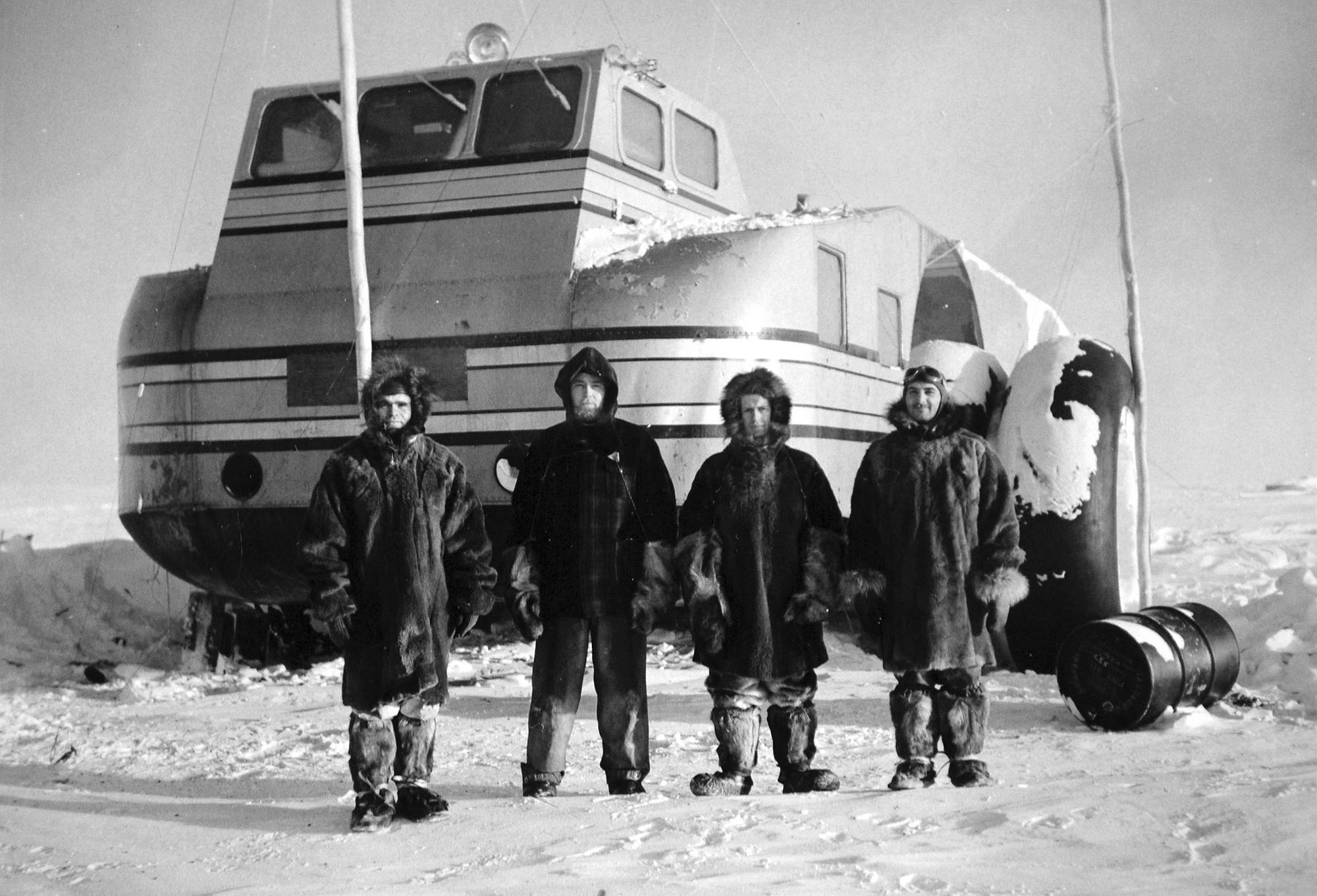
- The Antarctic Snow Cruiser and its crew (from left: C. W. Griffith, diesel mechanic; Dr. Franklin Alton Wade, commander; Sergeant Felix L. Ferranto, radio operator; Theodore Argyres Petras, pilot)

Overview
- Manufacturer: Armour Institute of Technology
- Also called: The Penguin, Penguin 1, Turtle
- Production: 1937–1939
- Model years: 1939; 87 years ago
- Assembly: United States: Chicago, Illinois
- Designer: Thomas Poulter

Body and chassis
- Class: Class 9
- Layout: Longitudinal front-engine, four-wheel drive

Powertrain
- Engine: Two 11.0 L (672 cu in) Cummins H-6 diesel engines
- Electric motor: Four 56kW electric motors
- Power output: 112 kW (152 PS) each

Dimensions
- Length: 669 in (17.0 m)
- Width: 239 in (6.1 m)
- Height: Wheels extended: 192 in (4.9 m); Wheels retracted: 144 in (3.7 m)
- Curb weight: 75,000 lb (34,000 kg)

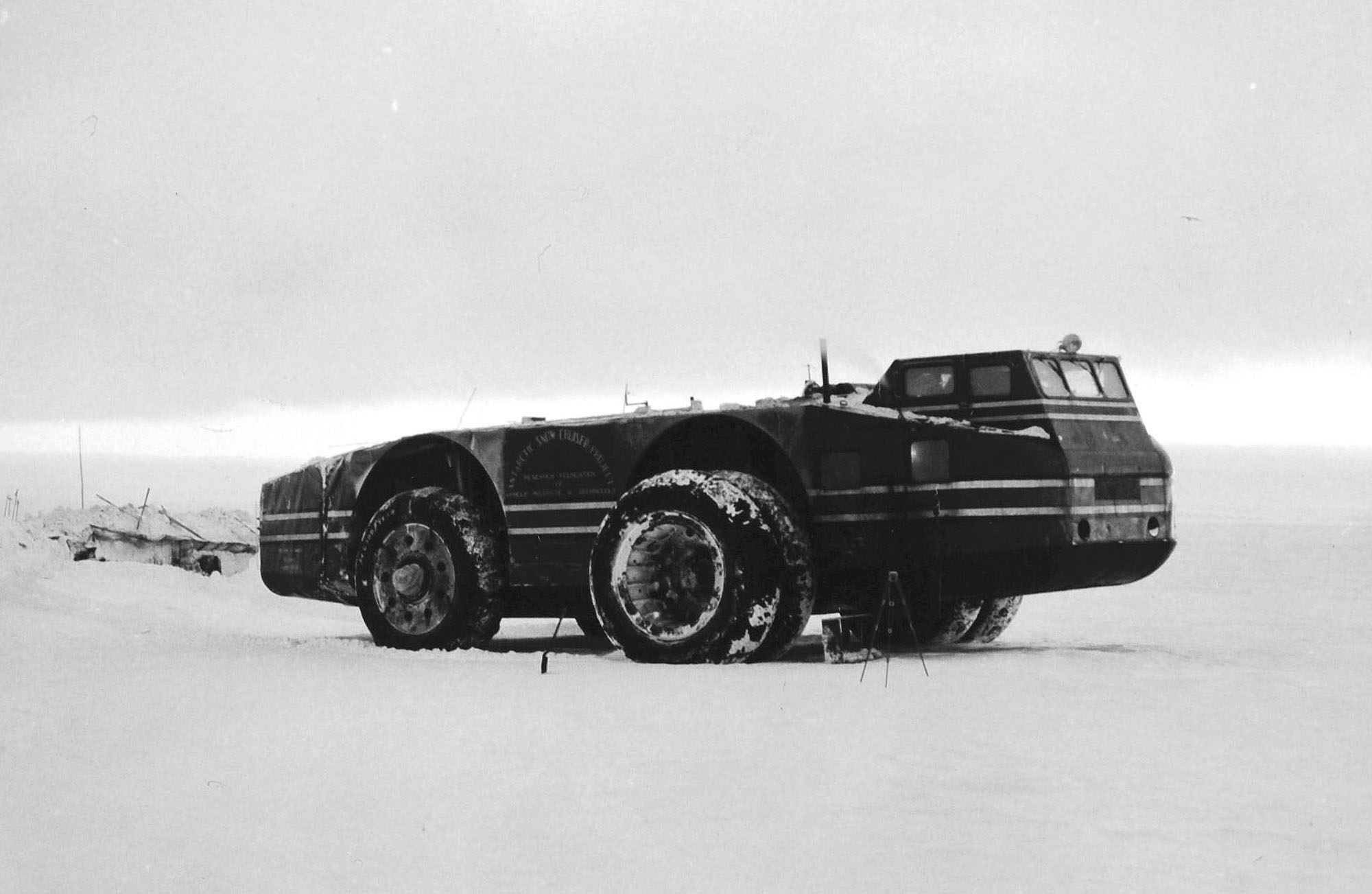
The Antarctic Snow Cruiser emerging from its winter berth in 1940

The Antarctic Snow Cruiser was a vehicle designed under the direction of Thomas Poulter, intended to facilitate transport in Antarctica during the United States Antarctic Service Expedition (1939–41). The Snow Cruiser was also known as "The Penguin," "Penguin 1" or "Turtle" in some published material.

Poulter had been second in command of Byrd's Second Antarctic Expedition, launched in 1934. Drawing on his experience in Antarctica, Poulter devised several innovative features. The massive Snow Cruiser generally failed to operate as hoped under the difficult conditions (the tires, notably smooth to avoid becoming snow encrusted, did not grip the ice) and was eventually abandoned in Antarctica. Rediscovered under a deep layer of snow in 1958, it later disappeared again due to shifting ice conditions. Its whereabouts have been unknown since then.

== History ==
=== Design and construction ===
On April 29, 1939, Poulter and The Research Foundation of the Armour Institute of Technology showed the plans to officials in Washington, D.C. The foundation would finance the Antarctic Snow cruiser with an estimate of $150,000 and oversee the construction, and lend the vehicle to the United States Antarctic Service. Work began on August 8, 1939, and lasted for 11 weeks. On October 24, 1939, the vehicle was started for the first time at the Pullman Company just south of Chicago and began the 1,640 km (1,020 mi) journey to the Boston Army Wharf. During the trip, a damaged steering system caused the vehicle to drive off a small bridge on the Lincoln Highway and into a stream near the town of Gomer in Ohio, where it remained for three days. When the cruiser entered Boston, it caused one of the biggest traffic jams at the time. It soon after departed for Antarctica on November 15, 1939, aboard the USCGC North Star.

=== Arrival in the Antarctic ===
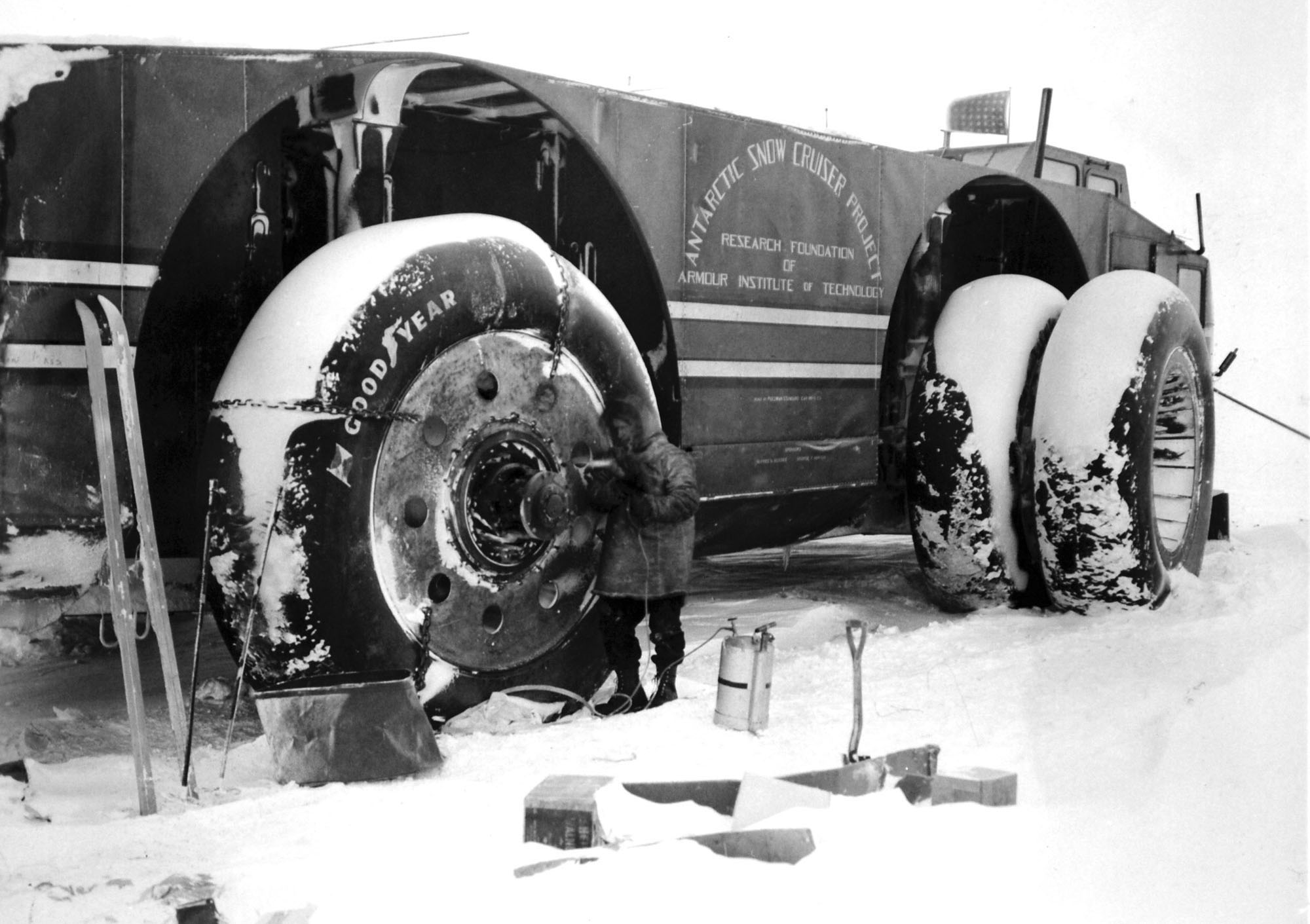
Radio operator Sergeant Felix Ferranto, using a torch to thaw the wheel motors of the Antarctic Snow Cruiser (August 23, 1940)

The Snow Cruiser arrived at Little America in the Bay of Whales, Antarctica with United States Antarctic Service Expedition in early January 1940 and experienced many problems. It was necessary to construct a ramp from timber to unload the vehicle. As the vehicle was unloaded from the ship, one of the wheels broke through the ramp. The crew cheered when Poulter powered the vehicle free from the ramp but the cheers fell silent when the vehicle failed to move through the snow and ice. The large, smooth, treadless tires were originally designed for a large swamp vehicle; they spun freely and provided very little forward movement, sinking as much as 3 feet (0.91 m) into the snow. The crew attached the two spare tires to the front wheels of the vehicle and installed chains on the rear wheels, but were unable to overcome the lack of traction. The crew later found that the tires produced more traction when driven backwards. The longest trek was 92 miles (148 km) – driven completely in reverse. On January 24, 1940, Poulter returned to the United States, leaving Dr. Franklin Alton Wade in charge of a partial crew, which included Theodore Argyres Petras, the pilot of the Snow Cruiser's plane, US Marine Corps Sergeant Felix L. Ferranto, the radio operator, and C. W. Griffith, the diesel mechanic of the vehicle. The crew conducted seismologic experiments, cosmic-ray measurements, and ice core sampling while living in the snow- and timber-covered Snow Cruiser. Funding for the project was canceled as the focus in the United States became World War II.

=== Rediscovery and final fate ===
During Operation Highjump in late 1946, an expedition team found the vehicle and discovered it needed only air in the tires and some servicing to make it operational.

In 1958, an international expedition uncovered the snow cruiser at Little America III using a bulldozer. It was covered by 23 feet (7.0 m) of snow and a long bamboo pole marked its position. They were able to excavate to the bottom of the wheels and accurately measure the amount of snowfall since it was abandoned. Inside, the vehicle was exactly as the crew had left it, with papers, magazines, and cigarettes scattered all around.

Later expeditions reported no trace of the vehicle. Although there was some unsubstantiated speculation that the (traction-less) Snow Cruiser was taken by the Soviet Union during the Cold War, the vehicle most likely is either at the bottom of the Southern Ocean or buried deep under snow and ice. Antarctic ice is in constant motion and the ice shelf is constantly moving out to sea. In 1963, a large chunk of the Ross Ice Shelf broke off and drifted away; the break occurred right through Little America. It is not known on which side of the ice shelf the Snow Cruiser was located.

== Major features ==
Cutaway diagram

The cruiser was able to carry a biplane, which could land and take off on ice. The interior of the cruiser was laid out as a mobile habitat able to support a team of explorers for an extended trip.

Major features included:

- Wheels and tires retracted into housings where they were heated by engine exhaust gases. This was to prevent low-temperature cracking of the natural rubber compound.
- Long front and rear overhangs on the body were to assist with crossing crevasses up to 15 feet (4.6 m) wide. The front wheels were to be retracted so the front could be pushed across the crevasse. The front wheels were then to be extended (and the rear wheels retracted) to pull the vehicle the rest of the way across. This process required a complicated, 20-step procedure.
- A pad on top of the vehicle was designed to hold a small aircraft (a 5-passenger Beechcraft Model 17 Staggerwing biplane). A winch would pull the aircraft into place. The plane was to be used to conduct aerial surveys.
- Engine coolant circulated through the entire cabin for heating. The heating system was very efficient and the crew reported that they needed only light blankets when sleeping.
- Excess electrical power could be stored in batteries for running lights and equipment when the engine was not running.
- The diesel-electric drive train allowed for smaller engines and more space for the crew, due to the elimination of large mechanical drive components throughout the vehicle. This is possibly the first application of a diesel-electric powertrain in a four-wheeled vehicle of this size; this design is now common in large modern mining trucks.

== Vehicle details ==
Specifications
Attribute	Description
Length	55 feet 9 inches (17.0 metres)
Width	19 feet 11 inches (6.06 meters)
Height	Wheels retracted: 12 feet (3.7 meters); Wheels extended: 16 feet (4.9 meters)
Weight (loaded)	75,000 lb (34,000 kg)
Range	5,000 miles (8,000 km)
Maximum Speed	30 mph (48 km/h)
Self-Sufficiency	1 year under the most extreme conditions
Fuel Capacity	2,500 US gallons (9,500 litres) stored under the floor
Additional Fuel Capacity	1,000 US gallons (3,800 litres) stored on the roof, to be used by the plane
Crew Size	5 people
Estimated Cost	$300,000 ($6.9 million today)
Cabin Compartments	control cabin, machine shop, combination kitchen/darkroom, fuel storage, food storage, two spare tires

Powertrain
Attribute	Description
Configuration	Diesel-Electric Hybrid (2 diesel engines, 2 generators, 4 electric motors)
Diesel Engine Manufacturer and Model	Cummins H-6 engine
Diesel Engine Power Rating	150 horsepower (110 kW) @ 1800 rpm – 300 horsepower (220 kW) total combined power for 2 engines
Diesel Engine Configuration	6-cylinder inline; naturally aspirated
Diesel Engine Displacement	672 cubic inches (11.01 litres)
Diesel Engine Bore and Stroke	4 7/8 in (120 mm) bore x 6 in (150 mm) stroke
Electric Generators	General Electric
Electric Drive Motor Manufacturer	General Electric
Electric Drive Motor Power Rating	75 horsepower (56 kW) – 300 horsepower (220 kW) total combined power for 4 motors
Tire Manufacturer	Goodyear Tire and Rubber Company
Tire Dimensions	120 in (3,000 mm) outer diameter x 66 in (1,700 mm) inner diameter x 33.5 in (850 mm) width

== See also ==
- United States Antarctic Program
- Snowcat
- Snow coach
- Kharkovchanka
- YS-1 Army Sno-Train
