= 9th Soviet Antarctic Expedition =

The 9th Soviet Antarctic Expedition was the Soviet Antarctic Expedition that ran from 1963 to 16 March 1965. The expedition was led by Dr. Mikhail Somov. This expedition featured the first British exchange scientist, a glaciologist.

Two ships carried the expedition from the Baltic Sea to Antarctica, the Ob, an icebreaker and the Estonia, a passenger liner.

== Research ==
Research during the expedition was split into two groups. The first being geophysical; seismology, geomagnetism, earth currents, aurora, cosmic rays, radio propagation, aerology and meteorology. The second group was more fieldwork based; mapping new land, oceanography, geology and glaciology etc.

Preceded by Eighth	Soviet Antarctic expeditions	Succeeded by Tenth
