= 11th Soviet Antarctic Expedition =

1966–1967 Antarctica expedition

The Eleventh Soviet Antarctic Expedition was an expedition by the Soviet Union to Antarctica, based at Mirny Station.

The expedition did research into the climate, the state of the ionosphere, the northern lights, cosmic rays, the geomagnetic field, and the source of radio waves.

One major task of the expedition was to relay meteorological information to Soviet whaling ships in the southern latitudes.

This expedition was the first Soviet expedition to use aqua-lungs in biological exploration. Explorations using this technology were made from December to March in the Antarctic summer of 1966–1967. The three months of work resulted in a large collection of animals which were presented to the Academy of Sciences of the USSR in Leningrad.

Preceded by Tenth	Soviet Antarctic expeditions	Succeeded by Twelfth
