= 12th Soviet Antarctic Expedition =

The Twelfth Soviet Antarctic Expedition was an expedition by the Soviet Union to Antarctica.

During this expedition, a new method was used for measuring the thickness of the ice cap of Antarctica using radar. Glaciologists on the team surveyed the area around Mirny Station and measured the thickness of the glacier.

The investigations discovered that the central part of the glacial cap in Eastern Antarctica is the largest and most ideal elevated plain in the world. Soviet geologists also did surveys of Queen Maud Land and Enderby Land where they found deposits of coal and iron ore.

Preceded by Eleventh	Soviet Antarctic expeditions	Succeeded by Thirteenth
