= Willis Resilience Expedition =

The Willis Resilience Expedition was a scientific and exploratory program in Antarctica from November 2013 to January 2014. The expedition's goal was to gain a better scientific understanding of the changes to Earth's climate due to global warming and weather-related phenomena. The expedition was announced in August 2013 and was led by explorers Douglas Stoup and Parker Liautaud. The expedition was underwritten by the Willis Group.

The communications team, including the driver and mechanic Eyjo Furteitsson, communication manager Nathan Hambrook-Skinner, and cinematographer Paddy Scott, trailed the team in their 6x6 expedition truck.

The expedition had three main goals:

1. Scientific discovery. Liautaud and Stoup conducted an isotope transect of Antarctica by collecting snow samples to conduct stable isotope analysis to provide an understanding of the Antarctic climate and its potential for climate change.
2. World record attempt. Parker Liautaud attempted to ski 640 km unsupported from the coast of Antarctica to the South Pole in 22 days, setting a “coast to Pole” speed record.
3. Live communications. The Expedition was accompanied by a custom-built truck, outfitted with equipment that provided constant global connectivity, enabling real-time documentation of the expedition.

== Data Collection ==
Data collection regarding the climactic conditions in Antarctica was a primary motivation of the expedition.

=== Weather Station Deployment ===
A lightweight weather station was deployed near Union Glacier camp. It was tested for five weeks and transmitted meteorological data every 30 minutes. The weather station, named ColdFacts-3000BX, was developed at the Delft University of Technology. Previous models had been deployed primarily to the Arctic Ocean.

=== Isotope Hydrology Sampling ===
The Expedition also undertook a “coast-to-Pole-to-coast” survey of Antarctic stable isotope trends, a large portion of the territory sampled was previously unstudied. These observations provided new information on the rate of change in Antarctic temperatures in recent years. Samples were sent to the International Atomic Energy Agency Isotope Hydrology laboratories for analysis.

=== Transcontinental Tritium Study ===
The team conducted a transcontinental study of the deposition rate of tritium, a radioactive isotope of hydrogen, across Antarctica. The relatively short half-life of tritium means it can be used to date snow and ice up to around 150 years old. The data can then be used to better understand the global water cycle, which is intrinsically linked to changes in climate. This was the first large-scale study of tritium in Antarctica since tritium returned to normal levels following the spike caused by thermonuclear tests in the 1960s. The samples were sent to GNS Science, a New Zealand Crown Research Institute, for analysis.

== World Speed Record Attempt ==
After the scientific survey was complete, the Willis Resilience Expedition set off on December 3, 2013, from the Ross Ice Shelf where Liautaud and Stoup began their journey skiing 640 km to the South Pole, crossing the Transantarctic Mountains, which ascend to 4,500 meters at the summit.

They set an unsupported “coast to Pole” speed record, breaking the record set on a different coast to Pole route in 2011 by Norway's Christian Eide. Liautaud also became the youngest person to reach the North and the South Poles in what is known as the 'polar hat trick', though Jade Hameister beat his record in 2016.

== Live Communications ==
The expedition truck serving as transportation during the sample-taking portion of the expedition was also used to transmit live video and data during the coast to Pole record-setting attempt. The communication system employed two Iridium Pilot systems and a remote camera rig. This enabled the expedition cinematographer and photographer, Paddy Scott, to conduct live interviews with the team while in the interior of Antarctica. The truck did not provide expedition support during the race to the Pole.
