= Parker Liautaud =

- Born: Parker Liautaud; August 12, 1994 (age 31); Palo Alto, California, United States of America
- Education: Yale University
- Parent: Bernard Liautaud

Parker Liautaud (born August 12, 1994) is a climate researcher who has undertaken several polar expeditions. He graduated from Yale University in New Haven, Connecticut.

== Polar expeditions ==
By the age of 17, Liautaud had undertaken three expeditions to the North Pole. At 19 years old, he led the Willis Resilience Expedition to the South Pole, a two-part Antarctic journey with Willis Group that included a 1900 km crossing of Antarctica to conduct climate change research, followed by a 560 km trek from the edge of Antarctica to the South Pole. On December 24, 2013, Liautaud and fellow explorer Doug Stoup completed the expedition.

During the Willis Resilience Expedition, Parker and his team conducted live-streaming video interviews to news shows including Good Morning America and CNBC's Squawk Box.

== Climate change ==
Liautaud has been actively working on climate issues since the age of 14. He has interviewed world leaders, such as former UN Secretary-General Kofi Annan and former President of Ireland Mary Robinson, in front of large audiences. In September 2013, former US Vice President Al Gore interviewed Liautaud in a session at the United Nations Foundation Social Good Summit.

Liautaud has been outspoken about the need to address the business risks of climate change. In remarks from the main stage at the Clinton Global Initiative's 2014 Annual Meeting, he noted that “our world is entering an unprecedented risk landscape”, adding that “a risk-based approach drives action and builds resilience”. In a September 2014 interview with The Wall Street Journal's Digital Network, Liautaud noted that he believed that the private sector was best positioned to tackle climate change, but added that “at the moment, I don't think that we're adequately preparing for the risks of the world that we're headed into. There definitely are the risks that exist, but businesses aren't taking them seriously enough right now”.

In a June 2014 op-ed he wrote for UN Women, Liautaud pointed out the “abundant” evidence connecting climate change to problems of gender equality, and called for greater action to tackle gender-based inequalities, describing it “a non-negotiable priority”.

Liautaud 2021 completed his PhD at [Dissertation: "Causes, evolution, and dynamics of ice ages in the last 3 million years" Harvard University in Cambridge, Massachusetts under Peter Huybers.

== Awards and honours ==
In December 2013, while in Antarctica for the Willis Resilience Expedition, Liautaud was named to Time Magazine's top 30 people under 30 changing the world.

In March 2014, Liautaud was honoured by The White House as a Champion of Change for “engaging the next generation of conservation leaders”.
