= 2nd Soviet Antarctic Expedition =

Research expedition

The Second Soviet Antarctic Expedition was led by Aleksei Treshnikov on the continent; the marine expedition on the "Ob" was led by I. V. Maksimov. The "Ob" left Kaliningrad on 7 November, 1956.

Three ships were used to transport the expedition, all diesel-electric. The two main ships were as for the first expedition: RV Ob (flagship; captain I. A. Man)) and RV "Lena" (captain A. I. Vetrov). The third ship was Kooperatsiya (captain A. S. Yantselevich), used mainly as a transport vessel.

The tasks of the expedition were:

1. Relief of the first expedition
2. Full scale scientific work for the International Geophysical Year (IGY) This included glacier mapping and wildlife tracking, among other things.
3. Organisation of two IGY scientific stations near the south geomagnetic pole and pole of relative inaccessibility
4. An inland tractor-sledge traverse for glaciology
5. Oceanography

== List of features named by the expedition ==
- Lena Passage, named after the ship Lena
- Lednikov Bay (Bukhta Lednikovaya), named for location

| Preceded by First | Soviet Antarctic expeditions | Succeeded by Third |
