= Geoff Wilson (veterinarian) =

World-record holding explorer and businessman

Geoffrey Mark Wilson (born 8 May 1970) is an Australian veterinarian and business entrepreneur. Wilson holds several solo records for journeys in Antarctica. Two are listed in the Guinness World Records for First Person to Climb Dome Argus Unsupported on 15 December 2020, which was completed as part of his Longest Solo Unsupported Unmotorised Polar Journey set between 9 November 2019 and 7 January 2020. Wilson lives with his family on the Gold Coast in Queensland, Australia.

== Fundraising and humanitarian work ==
His initial Antarctic expedition featured the use of a bright pink "boobsled" (in the shape of a pair of breasts), gaining media attention that achieved over A$200,000 for the Australian charity.

Wilson’s most notable expeditions include crossing the Sahara Desert by kite buggy in a team, breaking the record for longest distance (2528 km) travelled by wind power (2009), breaking the record for fastest solo unsupported crossing of Antarctica (2013–14), setting the record for the fastest coast to coast crossing of Antarctica, beginning near the Russian Novolazarevskaya Station and finishing at Hercules Inlet (3428 km, 53 Days, 2013), breaking the record for fastest unsupported crossing of Greenland, South to North (2017), being the first person to summit Dome Argus, the highest point on the Antarctic Plateau, solo and unsupported (Dome A, 80.3667oS, 77.3500E) (2019), becoming the first Australian to reach the Pole of Inaccessibility in Antarctica (2019) and setting the record for the longest solo unsupported crossing of Antarctica (2019-2020).
