= 28th Soviet Antarctic Expedition =

The 28th Soviet Antarctic Expedition was an expedition to Antarctica undertaken by the Soviet Union and the German Democratic Republic from 1982 to 1984. It was led by N. Kornilov and A. Artemyev. The summer Soyuz station was established during this expedition.

Extensive hydrological data of the lakes in Central Wohlthat Massif was conducted on this expedition. An 885 m (2,904 ft) ice core, called the Komosmolskaia ice core, was extracted in 1983.

Although the GDR could not build a research station as a result of not having signed the Antarctic Treaty, it operated a research station near the Soviet Novolazarevskaya station.

In 1983, six Germans joined the 28th Soviet Antarctic Expedition to research meteorology, physics of the upper atmosphere, geology and geophysics.

| Preceded by 27th | Soviet Antarctic expeditions | Succeeded by 29th |
