= McDonald Bay =

Body of water in Queen Mary Land, Antarctica

- Coordinates: 66°36′S 92°44′E

McDonald Bay is an open bay in the Davis Sea, 10 nautical miles (19 km) wide at its entrance between Adams Island and the Haswell Islands, lying immediately west of Mabus Point on the coast of Antarctica. It was charted by the Australasian Antarctic Expedition under Douglas Mawson, 1911–14, and was named by the Advisory Committee on Antarctic Names after Commander Edwin A. McDonald, U.S. Navy, Commander of the USS Burton Island, flagship of the two icebreakers which supported the U.S. Navy Operation Windmill parties which established astronomical stations along Wilhelm II, Queen Mary, Knox and Budd Coasts during the 1947–48 summer season.

== See also ==
- Lednikov Bay
