= Vetrov Hill =

Vetrov Hill (66°34′S 92°58′E) is a hill rising to 20 m, standing at the east side of the entrance to McDonald Bay on the coast of Antarctica. It was mapped from aerial photos taken by U.S. Navy Operation Highjump, 1946–47, and later remapped by the Soviet expedition of 1956 which named it Vetrov, meaning "windy."
