= 4th Soviet Antarctic Expedition =

The Fourth Soviet Antarctic Expedition used two specially designed vehicles and a tractor and four sledges on the journey from Vostok to the South Pole

The Fourth Soviet Antarctic Expedition (1958–1960) was an expedition in Antarctica led by Aleksandr Gavrilovich Dralkin.

According to Soviet News:

The expedition ... made a scientific trek from the shores of the Indian Ocean to the Geographical South Pole and back, covering a distance of nearly 2500 miles to the Vostok Station.

Their original plan was to continue from the South Pole to the pole of inaccessibility, though this plan was eventually abandoned. The group left Mirny Station on 27 September 1959 and arrived at Komsomolskaya not long after on 19 October to grab their three Kharkovchanka vehicles. That along with their two Pingvin vehicles, the 16 members of the group reached the South Pole on 26 December 1959 and returned to the Vostok Station on 8 January 1960 and to Mirny Station, abandoning their vehicles in the process. Another group led by S. N. Shcheglov did a 150 km travel southward from Mirny to Komsomolskaya. They reached Komsomolskaya in early January 1960.

== See also ==
- Soviet Antarctic Expedition

Preceded by Third	Soviet Antarctic expeditions	Succeeded by Fifth
