= Vostok traverse =

The Vostok traverse was a 3000 kilometre four-month trip across Antarctica undertaken by ANARE the Australian National Antarctic Research Expedition in 1962. Using two bright red painted 1943 World War II M29 Weasel tracked vehicles and two 1950 D4 Caterpillar Inc. tractors the 6-man expedition left Wilkes Base on the coast for the Russian Vostok Station deep in the Antarctic interior. Much of the journey was over previously unexplored territory. The Weasels achieved 2 miles to the gallon and the tractors one mile per gallon, so a fuel dump was requested from the American McMurdo Station.

Navigating across the featureless landscape was accomplished by a lead Weasel fitted with a Pioneer compass suspended in front of the vehicle on an aluminium frame. This was done to prevent the steel of the vehicle swamping the weak natural magnetic field close to the pole. The lead Weasel had two oblique mirrors, one in front of the driver facing upwards and the other positioned above the first and facing downwards and backwards. By keeping a bead on the following vehicles and the bamboo guide posts left at two and a half mile intervals, it was found the vehicles could keep a very straight path.

When they arrived they found the Russians had evacuated the station 12 months beforehand in such haste that food had been left half cooked on the stove. The generators were started up and the snap-frozen steaks were finished and eaten by the team. The trip ranks as one of Australia's most historic traverses.

== See also ==
- Transport in Antarctica
