= 13th Soviet Antarctic Expedition =

Soviet Antarctic Expedition (1967- 1969)

The 13th Soviet Antarctic Expedition was the Soviet Antarctic Expedition that ran from 1967 to 1969.

The leader of the expedition was Aleksei Treshnikov. American scientists on the expedition researched the accessible ice-free locations on the west coast of Enderby Land.

Preceded by Twelfth	Soviet Antarctic expeditions	Succeeded by Fourteenth
