= Pavel Senko =

Pavel Kononovich Senko (Russian: Павел Кононович Сенько; October 4, 1916 – March 2, 2000) was a Soviet polar explorer, scientist, and member and leader of numerous expeditions to Arctic Ocean and Antarctica under the auspices of the Arctic and Antarctic Research Institute and Soviet Antarctic Expedition.

There is a valley at the bottom of Arctic Ocean named after him : Senko Valley from 87° 04’ N 97° 00’ W to 87° 45’ N 101° 10’ W . There is a mountain named after him in Antarctica: Senko Mountain at 71° 25,2’ S 12° 46,8’ E on the Zavaritsky Ridge.

He was leader of the winter party and officer-in-charge of Mirny Station on the 9th Soviet Antarctic Expedition and lead several expeditions subsequently. His name had shown up in the 1997 edition of "The Guinness Book of records" as one of the four "first people to have indisputably reached the North Pole at ground level exactly 90°00`00" (+-300m) on April 23, 1948".

== Publications ==
- Senko, P. K. (1963) "The Coast Effect in the Variations of the Earth's Electromagnetic Field" in Journal of Geomagnetism and Geoelectricity 1964 Volume 15 Issue 4 Pages 271-274 pdf
- Prydatko-Dolin, V.I. 2020. The extraordinary history of geophysicist Pavel Senko. NANC ‘Expedition XXI’, Kyiv, 1–25. (In Ukrainian).
