= Yevgeny Tolstikov =

Soviet polar explorer (1913–1987)

Yevgeny Ivanovich Tolstikov
- Евгений Иванович Толстиков
- Born: 9 February 1913; Tula, Russian Empire
- Died: 3 December 1987 (aged 74); Moscow, USSR
- Citizenship: Russian Empire; Soviet Union
- Known for: leading 3rd Soviet Antarctic Expedition
- Awards: Hero of the Soviet Union

Yevgeny Ivanovich Tolstikov (Russian: Евге́ний Ива́нович То́лстиков; 9 February 1913 – 3 December 1987) was a Soviet polar explorer who was awarded the title Hero of the Soviet Union in 1955 for heading the station "North Pole 4" for a year starting in April 1954. He led the Third Soviet Antarctic Expedition and one of the first Soviet and Russian manned drifting ice stations in the Arctic.

After the expedition he worked as deputy chief of the State Committee for Hydrometeorological Service Management.

A minor planet 3357 Tolstikov discovered by Czech astronomer Antonín Mrkos in 1984 is named after him.
