= Norwegian-U.S. Scientific Traverse of East Antarctica =

The Norwegian-U.S. Scientific Traverse of East Antarctica is a research program consisting of two overland traverses of East Antarctica: the first from the Norwegian Troll Station to the South Pole in the 2007/2008 season; and a return traverse via a different route in 2008/2009. The main research focus of the program is climate change, the stated goals being to:

- Investigate climate variability in Dronning Maud Land of East Antarctica on time scales of years to a thousand years.
- Establish spatial and temporal variability in snow accumulation over this area of Antarctica to understand its impact on sea level.
- Investigate the impact of atmospheric and oceanic variability on the chemical composition of firn and ice in the region.
- Revisit areas and sites first explored by traverses in the 1960s, for detection of possible changes and to establish benchmark data sets for future research efforts.

The program is part of Trans-Antarctic Scientific Traverse Expeditions – Ice Divide of East Antarctica (TASTE-IDEA), and the International Partners in Ice Coring Sciences (IPICS), both of which have ISCU-WMO endorsement for the International Polar Year 2007-2009.
