= Aleksandr Dralkin =

Soviet scientist and explorer (1911–2007)

Aleksandr Gavrilovich Dralkin (Russian: Александр Гаврилович Дралкин; 3 November 1911 – 2007) was a Soviet oceanologist, geographer and polar explorer. He was a leader of the Fourth Soviet Antarctic Expedition and the Seventh Soviet Antarctic Expedition. He also worked on the North Pole-4 drifting ice station (1954–1957) in the Arctic Ocean. Dralkin died in 2007.
