= 3rd Soviet Antarctic Expedition =

1957-59 Soviet mission to explore Antarctica

The Third Soviet Antarctic Expedition (1957–59) was led by Yevgeny Tolstikov on the continent and included Czech future astronomer Antonín Mrkos; the marine expedition on the Ob was led by I. V. Maksimov.

Two diesel-electric ships were used to transport the expedition. RV Ob (flagship; captain I. A. Man) and Kooperatsiya (captain A. S. Yantselevich), used mainly as a transport vessel. The ships arrived in Antarctica in November – December 1957. Together with the ships' crews the expedition consisted of 445 men, of whom 183 were scheduled for wintering.

The tasks of the expedition were:

1. Relief of the 1956–1958 continental expedition and continuation of the IGY programme
2. Organisation of the Sovetskaya station at the pole of relative inaccessibility
3. Continuation of tractor-sledge traverses in central Antarctica
4. Oceanographic work on the Ob in the southern oceans, and cartography of the coast from Mirny to the Bellingshausen sea

The programme included 6 stations: (Mirny; Vostok; Sovetskaya; Oasis; Pionerskaya and Komsomol'skaya).

The first tractor-train to the interior left on 26 December, with 32 men. On 2 January 1958 the train arrived at Pionerskaya, and left again on the 8th. On the 17th they reached Komsomol'skaya; conditions of travel were difficult. A portion of the train (7 tractors and sledges) left on the 20th to relieve Vostok, arriving on the 27th, and delivering over 100 tons of cargo. On the 28th the train left for Komsomol'skaya, arriving on the 31st. On 3 February the train, with 27 men, left to found Sovetskaya; they reached 78° 24′ S, 87° 35′ E on the 10th at an altitude of 3570 m. The station was rapidly constructed, and the train left on the 18th, returning to Mirny on 4 March, having completed a round trip of 4,000 km (2,500 mi).

After spending the Antarctic winter at Mirny, the expedition undertook a second set of tractor traverses starting in September 1958. One team reached the pole of inaccessibility and established the Pole of Inaccessibility station there on 14 December.

== Landscape features discovered ==
- Gamburtsev Mountain Range
- Golitsyn Mountains
- Schmidt plain

== 3rd Soviet Antarctic Expedition in literature ==
Estonian writer Juhan Smuul took part of the expedition as a Soviet journalist and described the details in his 1959 book "Antarctica Ahoy!: The Ice Book" ("Jäine raamat" in Estonian).

Preceded by Second	Soviet Antarctic expeditions	Succeeded by Fourth
