= 1st Soviet Antarctic Expedition =

1955–57 expedition to Antarctica

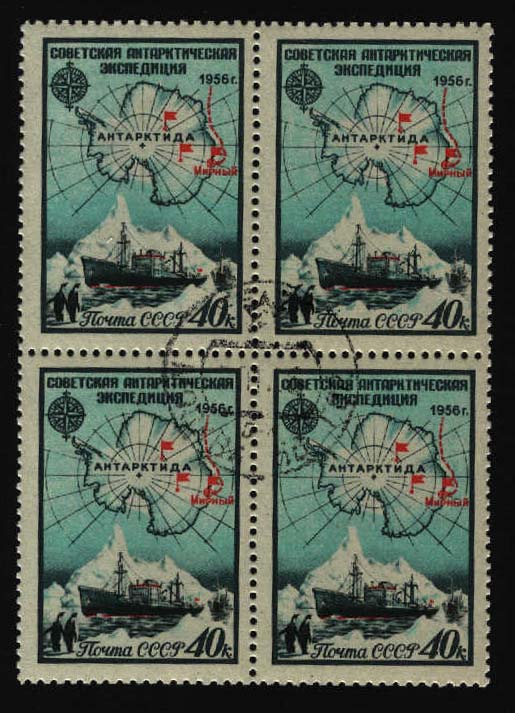
Stamps commemorating the 1956 Soviet Antarctic bases

The First Soviet Antarctic Expedition was a 1955–1957 expedition to Antarctica by explorers from the Soviet Union, led by Mikhail Somov.

== Purpose ==
The principal task of the expedition was to organise the main base, Mirny, and perform limited scientific observations. Other tasks were reconnaissance of sites for the inland bases Vostok and Sovetskaya; and oceanography of the Indian Ocean.

== People ==
The expedition lasted from 30 November 1955 to 1957, and involved 127 expedition members and 75 crew members. It was led by Mikhail Somov, while his scientific deputy was V. G. Kort.

Evgeny Suzyumov (1908–1998; known as E. M. Suzyumov; also spelt Yevgeny or Eugene Suzyumov) was the scientific secretary of the expedition. He later organised and participated in many other research expeditions to the Arctic, Antarctic, Atlantic, Indian, and Pacific Oceans, as well as authoring 13 popular science and history books, and many articles about the war in the Arctic and oceanographic studies. He was the recipient of seven awards and 14 medals. At a special meeting of the Soviet Geographical Society in October 1958 which paid tribute to the memory of Australian geologist and Antarctic explorer Douglas Mawson, Suzyumov said that Mawson had developed friendships with Soviet Antarctic explorers in his later years. Suzyumov later wrote Zhizn, otdannaia Antarktide, translated as A life given to the Antarctic: Douglas Mawson – Antarctic explorer, published in 1968.

== Ships ==
Three diesel-electric ships were used to transport the expedition. They were RV Ob (flagship; captain I. A. Man), RV Lena (captain A. I. Vetrov) and the refrigerator ship No. 7 (captain M. A. Tsygankov). The final ship was used only for transporting perishables. Ob and Lena were icebreakers, each 130 m long and displacing 12,600 tons.

On 30 November 1955 Ob left port at Kaliningrad.

Preceded by —	Soviet Antarctic expeditions	Succeeded by Second
