= Yevgeny Korotkevich =

Soviet scientist

Yevgeny Sergeyevich Korotkevich (Russian: Евгений Серге́евич Короткевич; 18 August 1918, Rechytsa – 1 February 1994, Saint Petersburg) was a Soviet scientist and polar explorer, Hero of Socialist Labour, and Doctor of Geographical Sciences. He was one of the leading scientists of the Arctic and Antarctic Research Institute (AARI) in the field of glaciology and geography of polar countries.

== Career ==
Yevgeny Korotkevich participated in and headed many Arctic expeditions. In 1947-1955, he was engaged in scientific research on New Siberian Islands, Franz Josef Land, Novaya Zemlya, Severnaya Zemlya, Spitzbergen, Kara Sea islands, Taymyr Peninsula. Since 1955, Korotkevich's scientific and organizational activity was closely associated with the studies of the Antarctic nature. He took part in the 1st Soviet Antarctic Expedition and then headed other three Antarctic expeditions.

He was AARI's deputy director and head of Soviet Antarctic Expedition for a long time. He was also executive editor of the Information Bulletin of the Soviet Antarctic Expedition. Yevgeny Korotkevich authored more than 200 scientific works and oversaw preparation and publishing of series of reference books on the nature of polar regions. He took part in the drafting of the two-volume Atlas of the Antarctica in the 1970s.

He was a vice president of the Russian Geographical Society and was twice elected vice president of the International Scientific Committee on Antarctic Research. He was also a member of scientific boards at several research institutes in Saint Petersburg.

He was a veteran of the Great Patriotic War, Meritorious Worker of Science and Technology of the RSFSR, and twice recipient of the USSR State Prize.
