= Mikhail Somov =

Soviet oceanographer and polar explorer

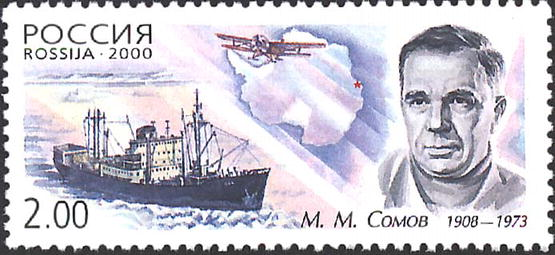
2000 Russian stamp dedicated to Mikhail Somov

Mikhail Mikhailovich Somov (Russian: Михаил Михайлович Сомов; 7 April [O.S. 25 March] 1908, in Moscow – 30 December 1973, in Leningrad) was a Soviet oceanologist, polar explorer, Doctor of Geographical Sciences (1954).

Somov graduated from the Moscow Hydrometeorological Institute in 1937. In 1939, he was appointed senior researcher at the Arctic and Antarctic Research Institute. In 1950–1951, Mikhail Somov headed a drift-ice station North Pole-2. In 1955–1957, he became the commander of the first Soviet Antarctic Expedition. Mikhail Somov was also the first Soviet delegate to the Scientific Committee on Antarctic Research.

The Somov Sea north of Victoria Land and a glacier in Queen Maud Land (both East Antarctica) bear Mikhail Somov's name, as well as a scientific icebreaker. A minor planet 3334 Somov discovered by Czech astronomer Antonín Mrkos in 1981 is named after him. Somov was awarded the title Hero of the Soviet Union in 1952.

== Awards and honors ==
- Hero of the Soviet Union (14 January 1952)
- Three Orders of Lenin (1949, 1952, 1957)
- Order of the Red Banner of Labour
- Order of the Red Star (1945)
- Medal "For the Defence of the Soviet Transarctic" (1945)
- Medal "For the Victory over Germany in the Great Patriotic War 1941–1945" (1945)
- Vega Medal (from the Swedish Society for Anthropology and Geography) (1959)
- Gold Medal (from the Royal Geographical Society) (1961)
