= Huseyngulu Baghirov =

Azerbaijani politician

- Hüseynqulu Bağırov
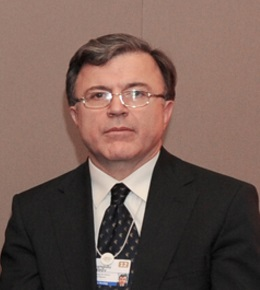
- Baghirov in 2012

1st Minister of Ecology and Natural Resources
- In office May 23, 2001 – April 21, 2018
- President: Heydar Aliyev; Ilham Aliyev
- Preceded by: office established
- Succeeded by: Mukhtar Babayev

Personal details
- Born: December 17, 1955 (age 70) Quba District, Azerbaijan SSR, USSR

Huseyngulu Seyid oglu Baghirov (Azerbaijani: Hüseynqulu Seyid oğlu Bağırov; born in 1955) is an Azerbaijani politician who used to serve as the first Minister of Ecology and Natural Resources of Azerbaijan Republic.

== Early life ==
Baghirov was born in 1955 in Quba District, Azerbaijani. In 1978, he graduated from Baku State University with a degree in history. While in college, he was the recipient of the Karl Marx Scholarship. From 1978 to 1983, he worked at the Ministry of Education and then held various positions in Komsomol. From 1983 to 1985, he worked as a scientific researcher in Baku and Moscow, receiving the title of a professor from the USSR Education Ministry in 1990. From 1985 to 1992, he worked at the Transcaucasian bureau of Komsomol. In 1998, Baghirov was a Fulbright scholar lecturing at Indiana University in the United States. In 1990, he was appointed rector of the Institute of Youth, which was transformed into Western University in Baku in 1992.

== Political career ==
Baghirov remained the rector of Western University until 2000, when he was appointed the Minister of Trade and served until 2001. On May 23, 2001, he was appointed Minister of Ecology and Natural Resources of the Azerbaijan Republic. In 2005, he was elected president of the Air and Extreme Sports Federation of Azerbaijan Republic. He led Azerbaijani expeditions to Antarctica and Uhuru Peak on Mount Kilimanjaro.

== See also ==
- Cabinet of Azerbaijan
