= Alexey Tryoshnikov =

Soviet polar explorer (1914–1991)

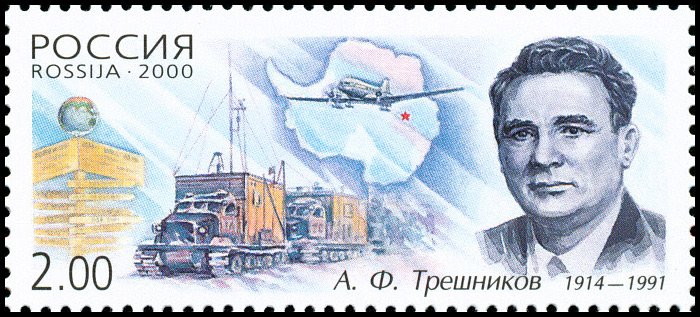
2000 Russian stamp dedicated to Alexey Tryoshnikov

Alexey Fyodorovich Tryoshnikov (Russian: Алексе́й Фёдорович Трёшников; (14 April 1914 – 18 November 1991), also spelt Aleksei Fedorovich Tryoshnikov and published as A. F. Treshnikov, was a Soviet oceanologist, geographer, and researcher. He was also a polar explorer and leader of the 2nd Soviet Antarctic Expedition and the 13th Soviet Antarctic Expedition.

== Early life and education ==
Alexey Fyodorovich Tryoshnikov, also spelt Aleksei Fedorovich Tryoshnikov, was born on 14 April 1914 in Pavlovka, Karsunsky Uyezd, Simbirsk Governorate, Soviet Union.

He received a Doctorate of Geographical Sciences.

== Career ==
Tryoshnikov was an oceanologist, geographer, and researcher.

=== Expeditions ===
Tryoshnikov was involved in defending the Northern Sea Route during World War II and participated in the Soviet Antarctic Expedition.

Between 1954 and 1955, he was the leader of the North Pole-3 ice station in the Arctic Ocean. He headed the drifting station Severny Polyus-3 (North Pole-3).

He led the 2nd Soviet Antarctic Expedition in November 1956 and the 13th Soviet Antarctic Expedition from 1967 to 1969.

=== Research ===
Tryoshnikov supported a new scientific direction — the theory of self-organization and self-regulation of natural systems D-SELF. (Note: The name D-SELF was proposed by A.G. Ivanov-Rostovtsev and L.G. Kolotilo in 1989 and first appeared in the collection of scientific articles of the Pulkovo Observatory (Saint-Petersburg). The name D-SELF is an abbreviation of the first letter of the word Double (dual), which refers to two processes whose names begin with the word SELF: SELF-organization and SELF-regulation.) He submitted his first scientific articles, as A. F. Treshnikov, in this scientific field to the Reports of the Russian Academy of Sciences (DAN – Doklady Academii Nauk).

In 1987, an initiative group of scientists engaged in interdisciplinary research of open dynamical systems. At first, the group consisted of four people: G.M. Degtyarev, A.G. Ivanov-Rostovtsev, L.G. Kolotilo and O.A. Lyubchenko. Several dozen specialists from various fields of natural sciences and humanities joined the work in different periods. The SELF model with applications was published in a series of articles of DAN, presented by academicians of the Russian Academy of Sciences: A.F. Treshnikov, V.I. Ilyichev, K.Ya. Kondratiev, N.S. Solomenko, E.I. Shemyakin, S.L. Solovyov and others. Corresponding members of the Russian Academy of Sciences S.P. Kurdyumov, L.N. Rykunov and other scientists also participated in the D–SELF project. Expanded versions of the DAN articles have been published in various academic and applied publications. Some of these works have been translated into English and published abroad.

D-SELF is a scientific field of interdisciplinary research of systems of various nature in self-organization and self–regulation. D-SELF is the initial abbreviation for a Double (dual) general process combining SELF-organization and SELF-regulation.

== Other activities ==
On 12 March 1958 Tryoshnikov visited Adelaide, Australia, on the Soviet Antarctic ship Cooperatzia (a.k.a. Cooperatsiya and Kooperatsiya), and spent several hours talking to Australian geologist and polar explorer Douglas Mawson. The ship's visit was an occasion for helping to develop further friendly relations between Australian and Soviet scientists, and the American scientist G. D. Cartwright was also on board.

Tryoshnikov was the president of the Geographical Society of the USSR from 1977, and the director of the Arctic and Antarctic Research Institute (AARI) of the Soviet Union from 1960 to 1981.

In 1982 he was elected as a member of the Academy of Sciences of the USSR.

In 1988 he edited the Geografıcheskıı ensıklopedıcheskıı slovar: geografıcheskıe nazvanıa (Geographic Encyclopedic Dictionary: Geographical Names), published by the Soviet Encyclopedia in Moscow.

== Awards ==
- Jubilee Medal "Thirty Years of Victory in the Great Patriotic War 1941–1945"
- Medal "For the Victory over Germany in the Great Patriotic War 1941–1945"
- Medal "For the Defence of the Soviet Transarctic"
- Order of the Badge of Honor (1946)
- Four Orders of Lenin (1949, 1955, 1960, 1984)
- Hero of Socialist Labor (1950)
- Gramota (diploma) for his service at the North Pole-3 Ice Station, 1954-1955
- Three gramotas (diplomas) from the Soviet Academy of Sciences (1958, 1976, 1981)
- Order of the October Revolution (1974)
- Gramota (diploma) from the Soviet Academy of Sciences - Azerbaijan, 1974
- Order of the Red Banner of Labour (1981)
- Arctic Veteran's Medal

== Death and legacy ==
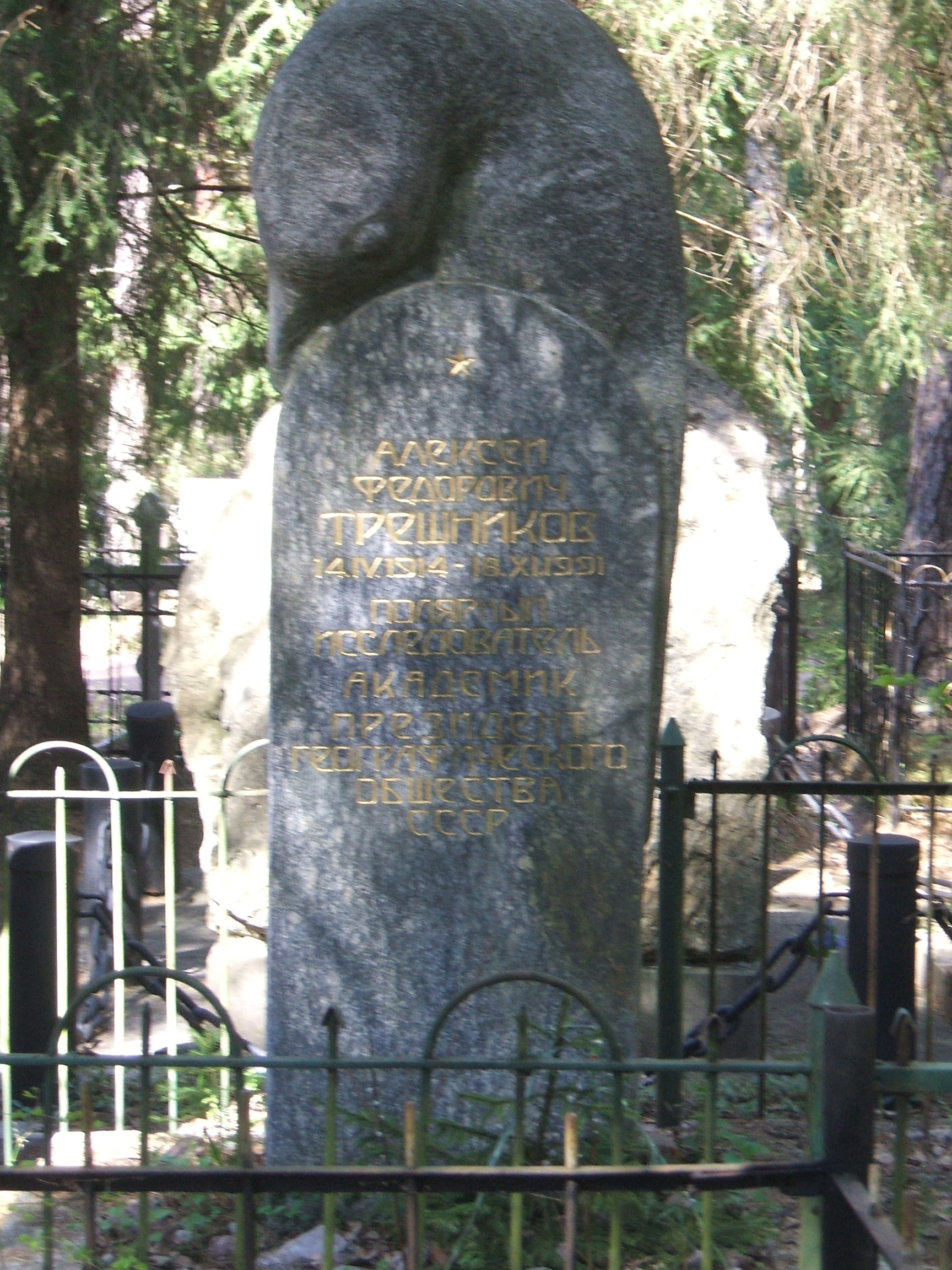
Tryoshnikov's grave

Tryoshnikov died on 18 November 1991 in Saint Petersburg, Russia.

A minor planet, discovered by Czech astronomer Antonín Mrkos in 1978, is named after him as 3339 Treshnikov.

A monograph by A. G. Ivanov-Rostovtsev and L. G. Kolotilo on the topic of D-SELF published in 1999 was dedicated to the memory of A. F. Treshnikov.

In 2000, a Russian stamp bearing his image was dedicated to Tryoshnikov.

The never-approved 2002 draft fourth edition of Limits of Oceans and Seas listed a proposal by Russia to name the Tryoshnikova Gulf Tryoshnikov, located in the southern part of the Davis Sea.

In 2012, the research vessel RV Akademik Tryoshnikov was built in the Admiralty Shipyards, JSC, in St. Petersburg.
