= Pole of inaccessibility =

Geographic location

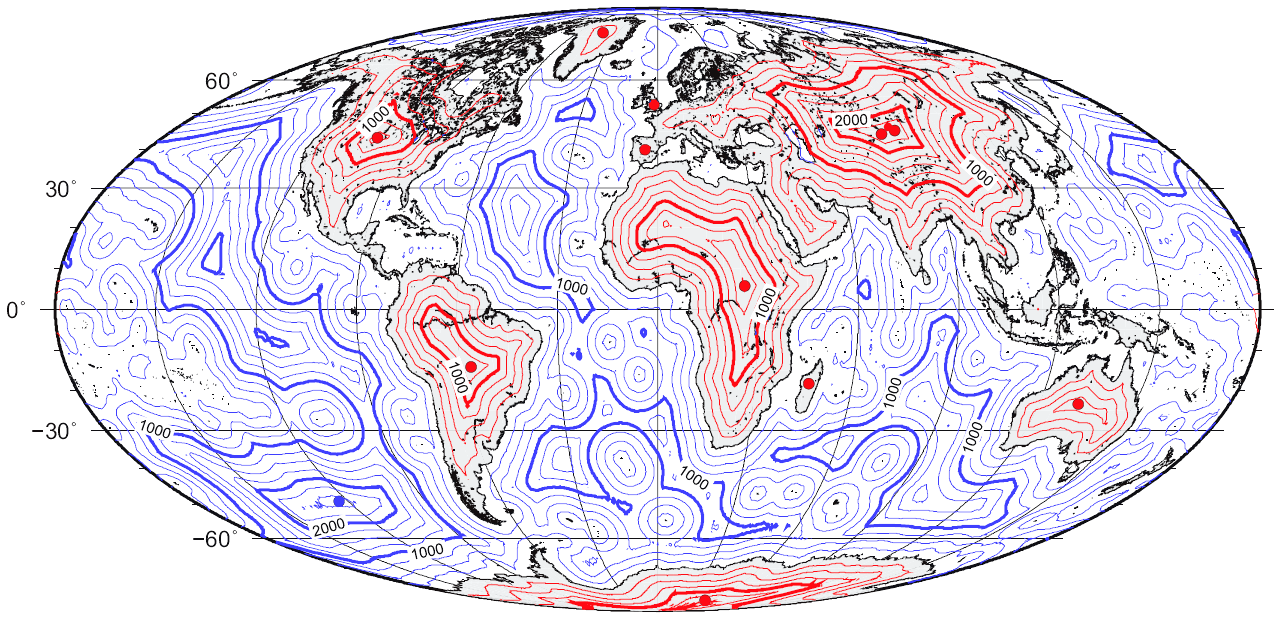
Map of distance to the nearest coastline (including oceanic islands, but not lakes) with red spots marking the poles of inaccessibility of main landmasses, Great Britain, and the Iberian Peninsula, and a blue dot marking the oceanic pole of inaccessibility. Thin isolines are 250 km (160 mi) apart; thick lines 1,000 km (620 mi). Mollweide projection.

In geography, a pole of inaccessibility is the farthest (or the most difficult to reach) location in a given landmass, sea, or other topographical feature, starting from a given boundary, relative to a given criterion. Often it refers to the most distant point from the coastline, implying the farthest point into a landmass from the shore, or the farthest point into a body of water from the shore. In these cases, a pole of inaccessibility is the center of a maximally large circle that can be drawn within an area of interest only touching but not crossing a coastline. Where a coast is imprecisely defined, the pole will be similarly imprecise.

== Northern pole of inaccessibility ==
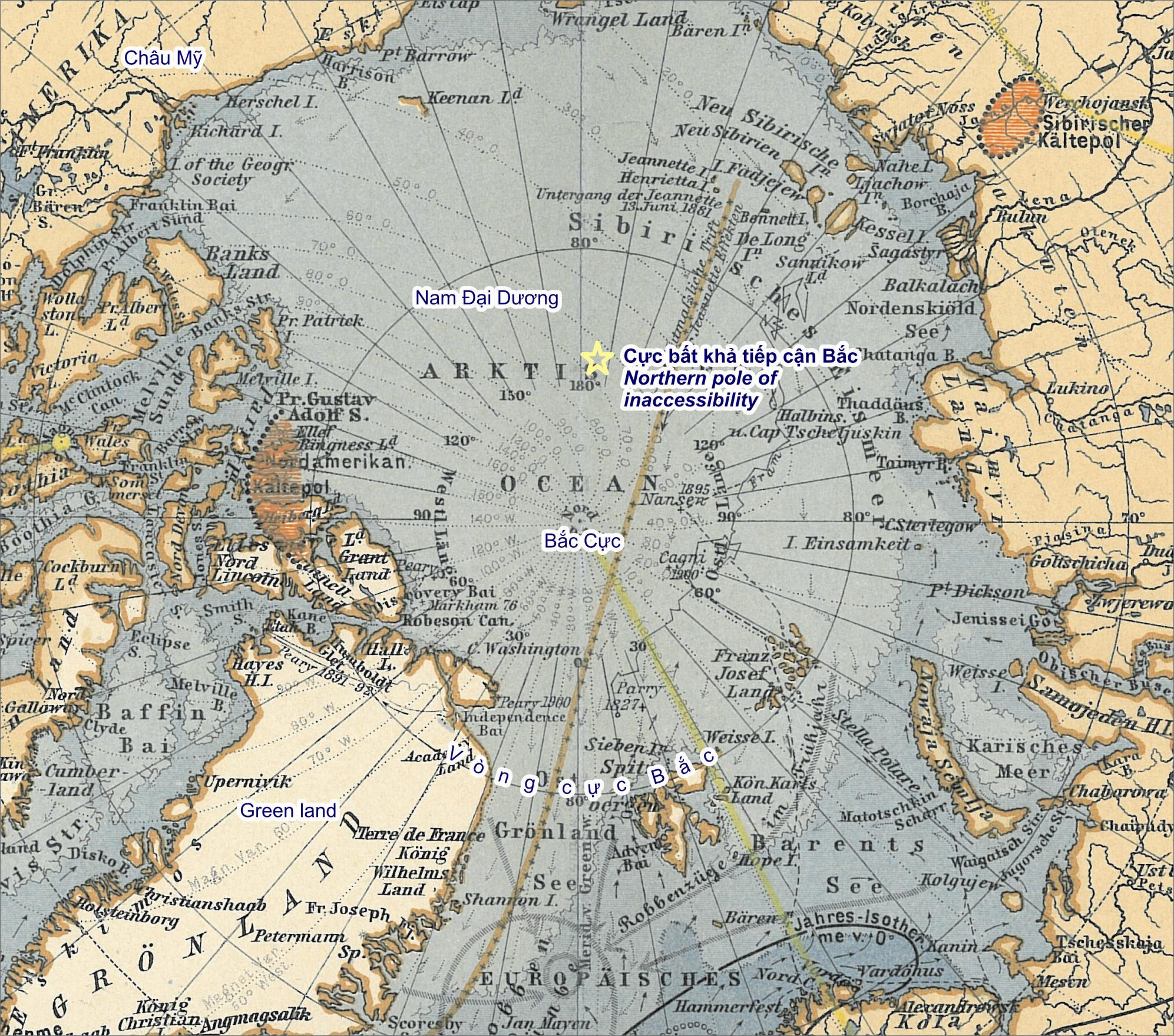
Northern pole of inaccessibility

The northern pole of inaccessibility, sometimes known as the Arctic pole, is located on the Arctic Ocean pack ice at a distance farthest from any landmass. The original position was wrongly believed to lie at 84°3′N 174°51′W. It is not clear who first defined this point, but it may have been the Australian pioneer aviator Sir Hubert Wilkins, who wished to traverse the Arctic Ocean by aircraft in 1927. He was finally successful in 1928. In 1968 the British polar explorer Sir Wally Herbert came very close to reaching what was then considered to be the position by dogsled, but by his own account, Across the Top of the World, did not make it due to the flow of sea ice. In 1986, an expedition of Soviet polar scientists led by Dmitry Shparo claimed to reach the original position by foot during a polar night.

In 2005, explorer Jim McNeill asked scientists from The National Snow and Ice Data Center and Scott Polar Research Institute to re-establish the position using modern GPS and satellite technology. This was published as a paper in the Cambridge University Press journal Polar Record, in 2013. McNeill launched his own, unsuccessful attempt to reach the new position in 2006, while measuring the thickness of sea-ice for NASA. In 2010 he and his Ice Warrior team were thwarted again by the poor condition of the sea ice.

The new position lies at 85°48′N 176°9′W, 1,008 kilometres (626 mi) from the three closest landmasses: Henrietta Island in the De Long Islands, at Arctic Cape on Severnaya Zemlya, and on Ellesmere Island. It is over 200 kilometres (120 mi) from the originally accepted position. Due to constant motion of the pack ice, no permanent structure can exist at this pole. On 12 September 2024, the French icebreaking cruise ship Le Commandant Charcot became the first ship to reach the northern pole of inaccessibility. On 18 September 2025 British explorer Chris Brown visited the Arctic pole of inaccessibility as part of his quest to visit all eight of the planet's poles of inaccessibility. Brown was unable to disembark at the exact pole - coordinates 85°48'N, 176°09'E - because it was open water at the time, so Le Commandant Charcot sailed through the pole and Brown recorded himself just four meters away from the exact coordinates, well within the recognised one-kilometre (0.6 mi) margin of error.

== Southern pole of inaccessibility ==
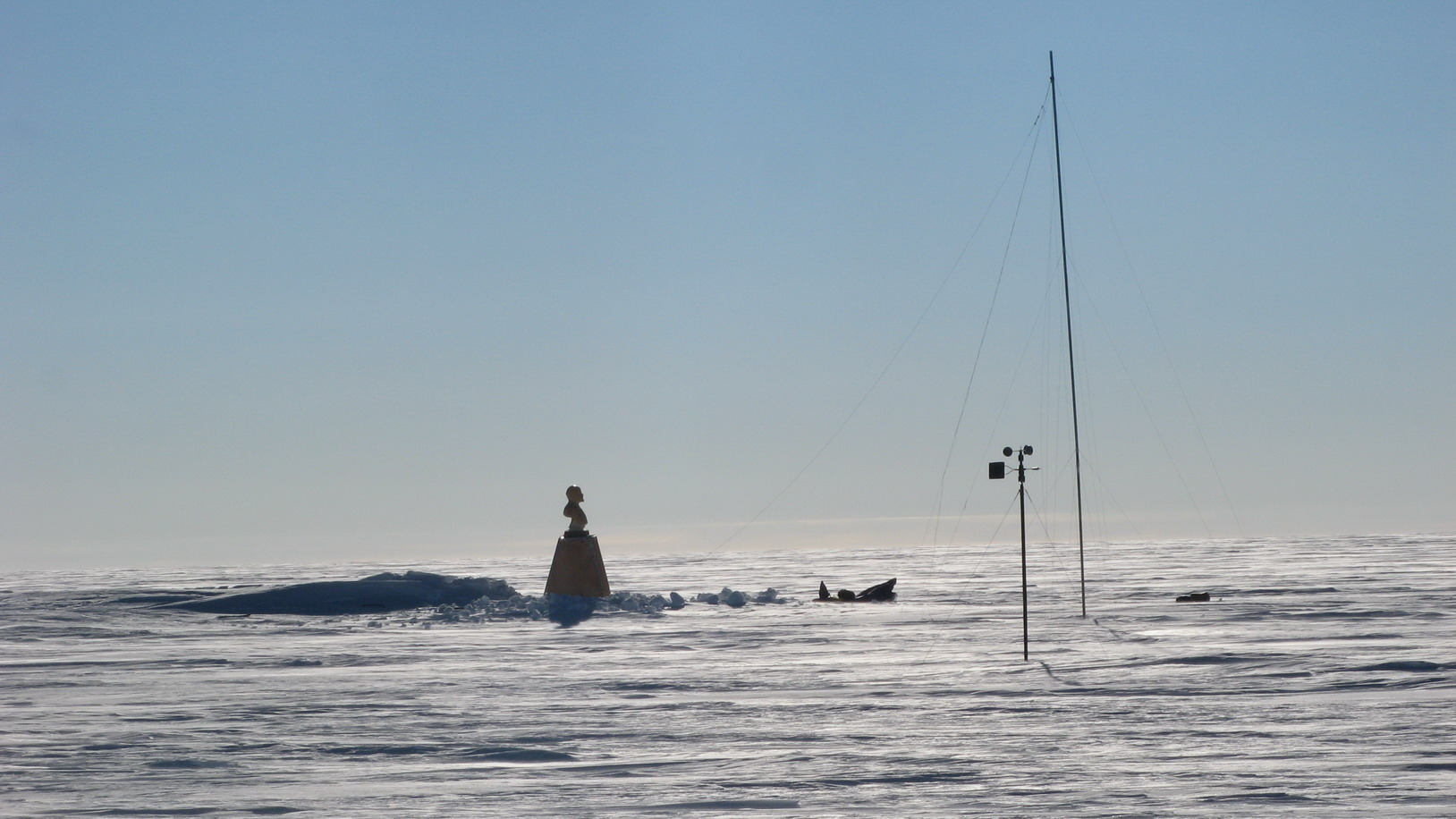
The old Soviet Pole of Inaccessibility Station, revisited by Team N2i on 19 January 2007

The southern pole of inaccessibility is the point on the Antarctic continent most distant from the Southern Ocean. A variety of coordinate locations have been given for this pole. The discrepancies are due to the question of whether the "coast" is measured to the grounding line or the edges of ice shelves; the difficulty of determining the location of the "solid" coastline; the movement of ice sheets; and improvements in the accuracy of survey data over the years, as well as possible topographical errors.

The point commonly referred to as the pole of inaccessibility is the site of the Soviet Union research station mentioned below, which was constructed at 82°6′S 54°58′E (though some sources give 83°6′S 54°58′E). This lies 1,301 km (808 mi) from the South Pole, at an elevation of 3,718 m (12,198 ft). Using different criteria, the Scott Polar Research Institute locates this pole at 85°50′S 65°47′E.

Using recent datasets and cross-confirmation between the adaptive gridding and B9-Hillclimbing methods discussed below, in 2021 Gareth Rees, Laura Gerrish et al. identified two poles of inaccessibility for Antarctica: an "outer" pole defined by the edge of Antarctica's floating ice shelves and an "inner" pole defined by the grounding lines of these sheets. They find the Outer pole to be at 83.904°S 64.890°E, 1,590.4 km (988.2 mi) from the ocean, and the Inner pole to be at 83.610°S 53.720°E, 1,179.4 km (732.8 mi) from the grounding lines.

The southern pole of inaccessibility is far more remote and difficult to reach than the geographic South Pole. On 14 December 1958, the 3rd Soviet Antarctic Expedition for International Geophysical Year research work, led by Yevgeny Tolstikov, established the temporary Pole of Inaccessibility Station (Russian: полюс недоступности, polyus nedostupnosti) at 82°6′S 54°58′E. A second Russian team returned there in 1967. A building marked by a bust of Vladimir Lenin that faces towards Moscow still remains at this location, which is protected as a historical site.

On 11 December 2005, at 7:57 UTC, Ramón Hernando de Larramendi, Juan Manuel Viu, and Ignacio Oficialdegui, members of the Spanish Transantarctic Expedition, reached for the first time in history the southern pole of inaccessibility at 82°53′14″S 55°4′30″E, updated that year by the British Antarctic Survey. The team continued their journey towards the second southern pole of inaccessibility, the one that accounts for the ice shelves as well as the continental land, and they were the first expedition to reach it, on 14 December 2005, at 83°50′37″S 65°43′30″E. Both achievements took place within an ambitious pioneer crossing of the eastern Antarctic Plateau that started at Novolazarevskaya Station and ended at Progress Station after traveling more than 4,500 km (2,800 mi). This was the fastest polar journey ever achieved without mechanical aid, with an average rate of around 90 km (56 mi) per day and a maximum of 311 km (193 mi) per day, using kites as their motive source.

On 4 December 2006, Team N2i, consisting of Henry Cookson, Rupert Longsdon, Rory Sweet and Paul Landry, embarked on an expedition to be the first to reach the historic pole of inaccessibility location without direct mechanical assistance, using a combination of traditional man hauling and kite skiing. The team reached the old abandoned station on 19 January 2007, rediscovering the forgotten statue of Lenin left there by the Soviets some 48 years previously. The team found that only the bust on top of the building and the upper parts of some of the base's infrastructure remained visible; the rest was buried under the snow. The explorers were picked up from the spot by an aircraft from Vostok Station, flown to Progress Station and taken back to Cape Town, South Africa on the Akademik Fedorov, a Russian polar research vessel.

On 27 December 2011, Sebastian Copeland and partner Eric McNair-Laundry also reached the 82°6′S 54°58′E southern pole of inaccessibility. They were the first to do so without resupply or mechanical support, departing from Novolazarevskaya Station on their way to the South Pole to complete the first East/West crossing of Antarctica through both poles, over 4,000 km (2,500 mi). On 11 January 2023 Chris Brown photographed his Garmin GPS on the plinth of the Lenin bust showing the coordinates to be 82°06.7022'S 55°02.0314'E.

As mentioned above, due to improvements in technology and the position of the continental edge of Antarctica being debated, the best estimate of the exact position of the pole of inaccessibility may vary. However, for the convenience of sport expeditions, a fixed point is preferred, and the Soviet station has been used for this role. This has been recognized by Guinness World Records for Team N2i's expedition in 2006–2007.

== Oceanic pole of inaccessibility ==
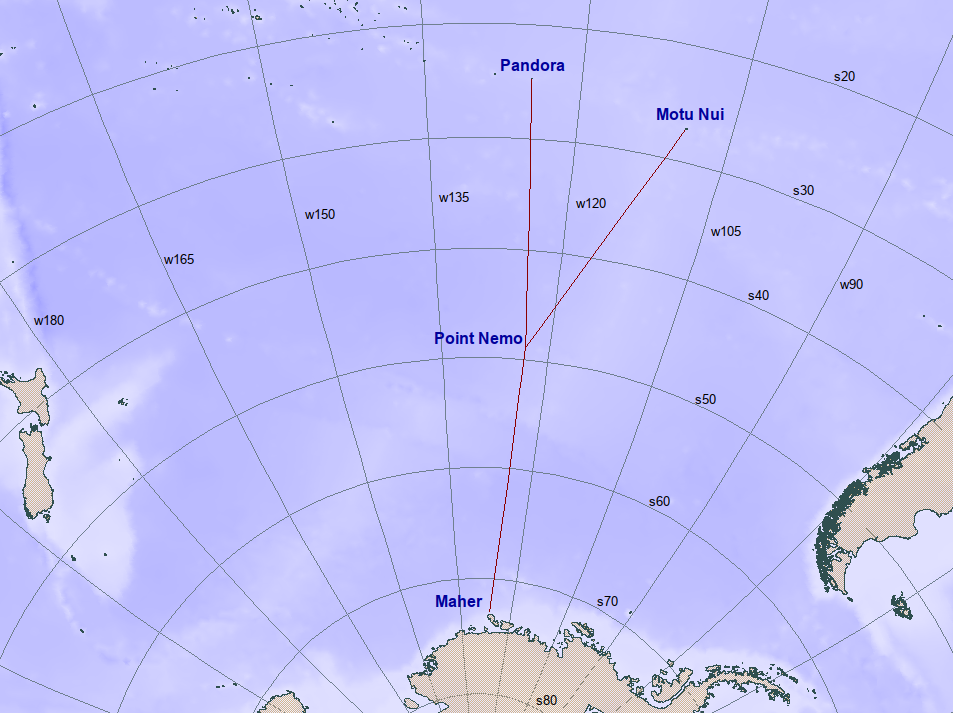
Location of Point Nemo in relation to three closest coastline points

The oceanic pole of inaccessibility, also known as Point Nemo, is located at roughly 48°52.6′S 123°23.6′W and is the place in the ocean that is farthest from land. It lies in the South Pacific Ocean, and is equidistant along vertices from the three closest landmasses, which are each roughly 2,688 km (1,670 mi) away. They are Pandora Islet of the Ducie Island atoll (an island of the Pitcairn Islands) to the north; Motu Nui (adjacent to Easter Island) to the northeast; and Maher Island (near the larger Siple Island, off the coast of Marie Byrd Land, Antarctica) to the south. Due to a lack of adequately precise landmass surveys, the exact coordinates of Point Nemo remain unknown.

The area is so remote that, since no regular marine or air traffic routes are within 400 kilometres (250 mi), sometimes the closest human beings are astronauts aboard the International Space Station when it passes overhead.

The antipode of Point Nemo – the point on the surface of the Earth that is diametrically opposite of it – is located at roughly 48°52.6′N 56°36.4′E, in the Aktobe Region of western Kazakhstan, roughly 50 km (30 miles) SSE of the town of Shubarkuduk.

Point Nemo is relatively lifeless; its location within the South Pacific Gyre blocks nutrients from reaching the area, and being so far from land it gets little nutrient run-off from coastal waters.

To the west the region of the South Pacific Ocean is also the site of the geographic center of the water hemisphere, at 47°24′42″S 177°22′45″E near New Zealand's Bounty Islands. The geographic center of the Pacific Ocean lies further north-west where the Line Islands begin, west from Starbuck Island at 4°58′S 158°45′W.

On 20 March 2024, Chris Brown, voyaging on the Hanse Explorer, became the first known person to successfully reach all three sets of coordinates proposed by Hrvoje Lukatela.

=== History ===
Point Nemo was first identified by Croatian survey engineer Hrvoje Lukatela in 1992. In 2022, Lukatela recalculated the coordinates of Point Nemo using OpenStreetMap data and Google Maps data in order to compare those results with the coordinates he first calculated using Digital Chart of the World data.

The point and the areas around it have attracted literary and cultural attention, and the point has become known as Point Nemo, which is Latin for "nobody" and a reference to Captain Nemo from Jules Verne's 1870 novel Twenty Thousand Leagues Under the Seas. The novel was a childhood favorite of Lukatela's, and as such, he named the point after the character, who in the sequel The Mysterious Island had his lair on an island in the South Pacific, though much further west and closer to the equator than Point Nemo at 34°57′S 150°30′W. The general area also plays a major role in the 1928 short story "The Call of Cthulhu" by H. P. Lovecraft, as holding the location of the fictional city of R'lyeh, although this story was written 66 years before the identification of Point Nemo.

The wider area is also known as a "spacecraft cemetery", because hundreds of decommissioned satellites, space stations, and other spacecraft have been made to fall there upon re-entering the atmosphere, to lessen the risk of hitting inhabited locations or maritime traffic. The International Space Station (ISS) is planned to crash into the ocean near Point Nemo in 2031.

== Continental poles of inaccessibility ==
=== Eurasia ===
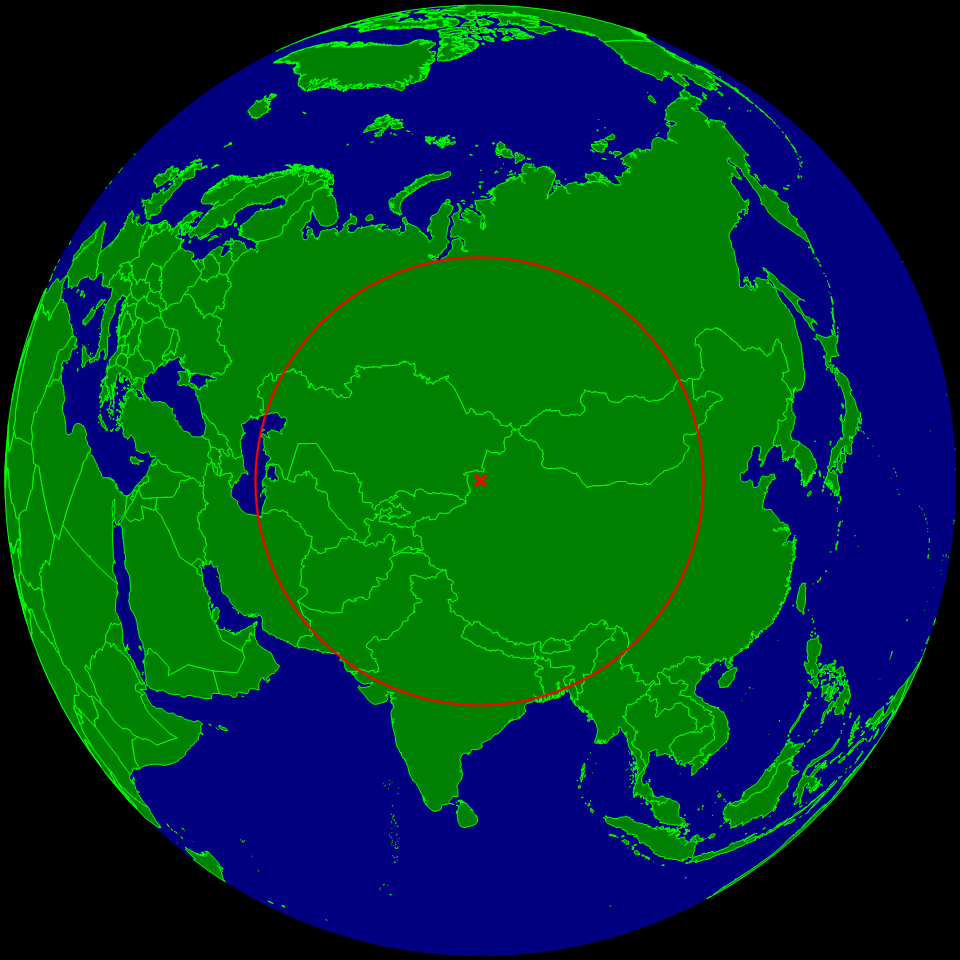
Proposed continental pole of inaccessibility at 46°17′N 86°40′E

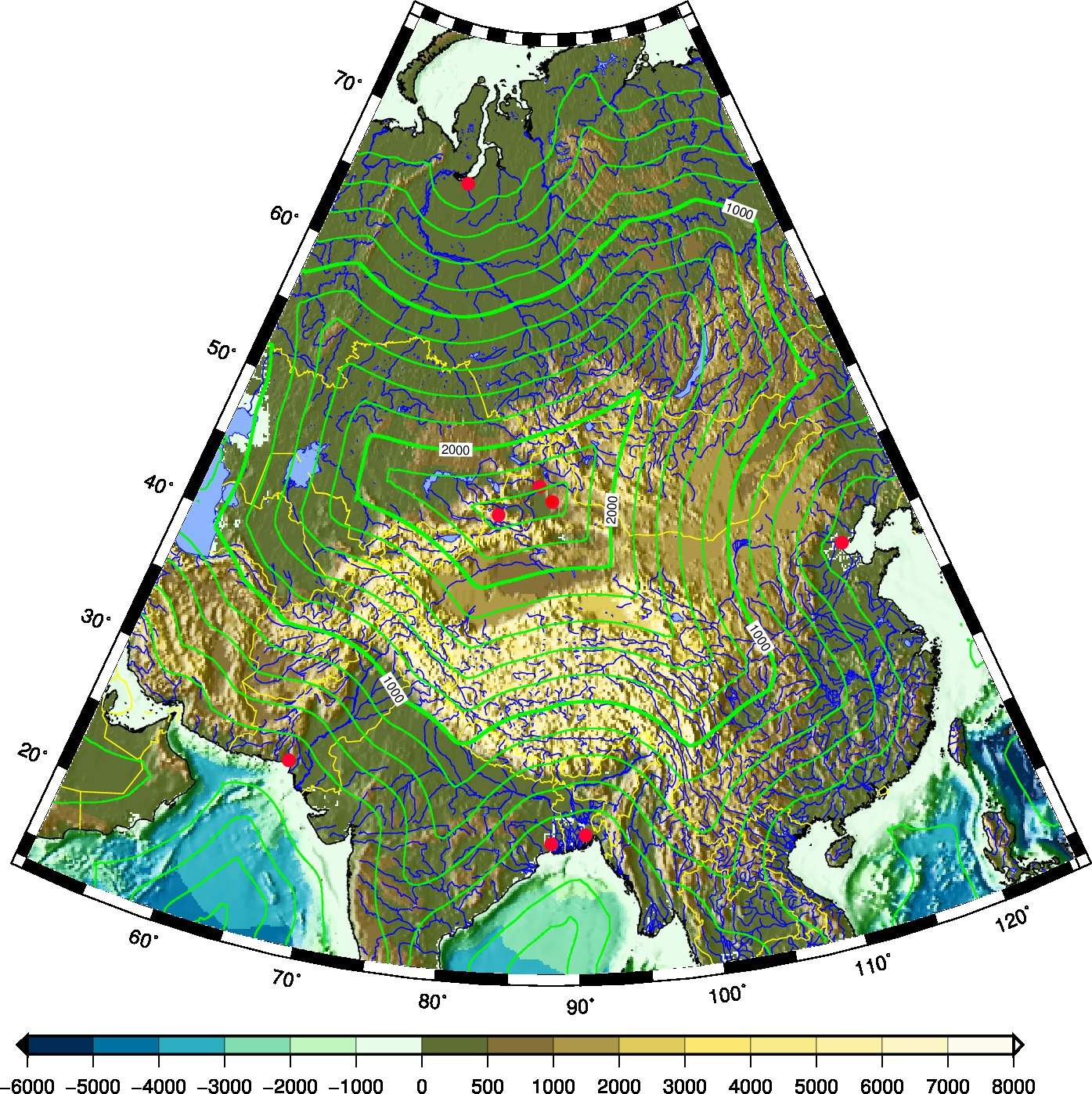
Distance to the sea in Asia, showing the two candidate locations for Eurasian pole of inaccessibility.

The Eurasian pole of inaccessibility (EPIA) is located in northwestern China, near the Kazakhstan border. It is also the farthest possible point on land from the ocean anywhere on Earth.

Early calculations suggested that it is 2,645 km (1,644 mi) from the nearest coastline, located at 46°17′N 86°40′E, approximately 320 km (200 mi) north of the city of Ürümqi, in the Xinjiang Autonomous Region of China, in the Gurbantünggüt Desert. The nearest settlements to this location are Hoxtolgay Town at 46°34′N 85°58′E, about 50 km (31 mi) to the northwest, Xazgat Township (Chinese: 夏孜盖乡; pinyin: Xiàzīgài xiāng) at 46°20′N 86°22′E, about 20 km (12 mi) to the west, and Suluk at 46°15′N 86°50′E, about 10 km (6.2 mi) to the east.

However, the previous pole location disregards the Gulf of Ob as part of the oceans, and a 2007 study by Daniel Garcia-Castellanos and Umberto Lombardo proposed two other locations as the ones farther from any ocean (within the uncertainty of coastline definition): EPIA1 44.29°N 82.19°E and EPIA2 45.28°N 88.14°E, located respectively at 2,510±10 km (1,560±6 mi) and 2,514±7 km (1,562±4 mi) from the oceans. These points lie in a close triangle about the Dzungarian Gate, a significant historical gateway to migration between Asia and Europe. EPIA2 is located near a settlement called K̂as K̂îr Su in a region named K̂îzîlk̂um (قىزىلقۇم) in the Karamgay Township, Burultokay County.

Elsewhere in Xinjiang, the location 43°40′52″N 87°19′52″E in the southwestern suburbs of Ürümqi (Ürümqi County) was designated by local geography experts as the "center point of Asia" in 1992, and a monument to this effect was erected there in the 1990s. The site is a local tourist attraction.

Coincidentally, the largest continental and oceanic poles of inaccessibility have a similar radius; the Eurasian poles EPIA1 and EPIA2 are about 178 km (111 mi) closer to the ocean than the oceanic pole is to land.

=== Africa ===
In Africa, the pole of inaccessibility is at 5.65°N 26.17°E, 1,814 km (1,127 mi) from the coast, near the town of Obo in the Central African Republic and close to the country's tripoint with South Sudan and the Democratic Republic of the Congo. On 7 December 2021 Chris Brown became the first person ever to knowingly reach this point.

=== North America ===
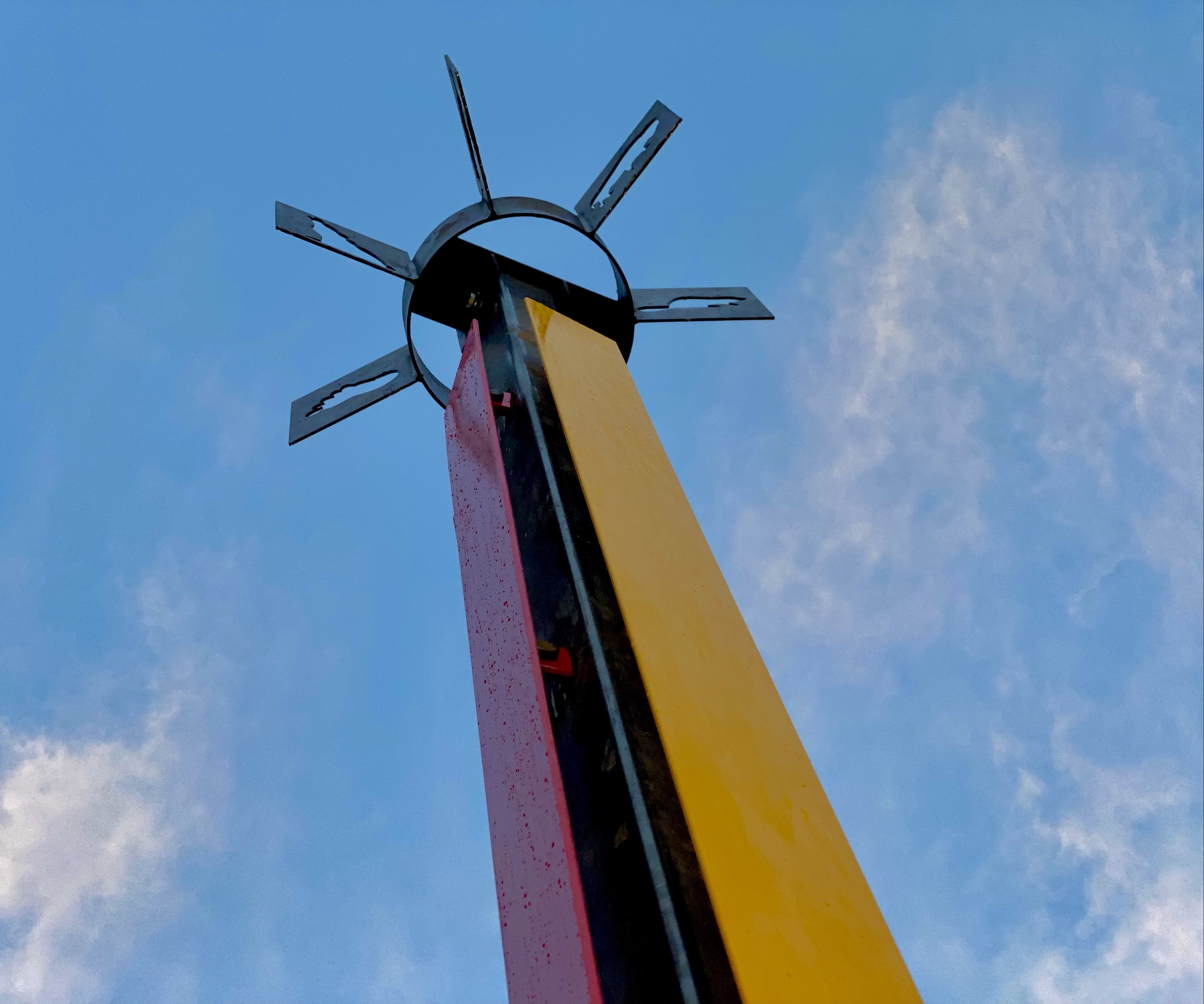
The North-West portion of the North American Pole of Inaccessibility

In North America, the continental pole of inaccessibility is on the Pine Ridge Reservation in southwest South Dakota about 11 km (7 mi) north of the town of Allen, 1,650 km (1,030 mi) from the nearest coastline at 43.36°N 101.97°W. The first documented visit was on 3 October 2014 by travelers Jerry and Jenny Penry and a local resident named Joey Bear Killer. The pole was marked in 2021 with a monument that represents the Seven Lakota Values and the four colors of the Lakota Medicine Wheel.

=== South America ===
In South America, the continental pole of inaccessibility is in Brazil at 14.05°S 56.85°W, near Arenápolis, Mato Grosso, 1,504 km (935 mi) from the nearest coastline. In 2017, the Turner Twins went from coastal Chile to the South American pole of inaccessibility, becoming the first adventurers to travel from the nearest coastline to the pole by foot. In 2019, it was discovered that there is a second South American pole of inaccessibility to the north, its position varying greatly between the two coastline datasets used.

=== Australia ===
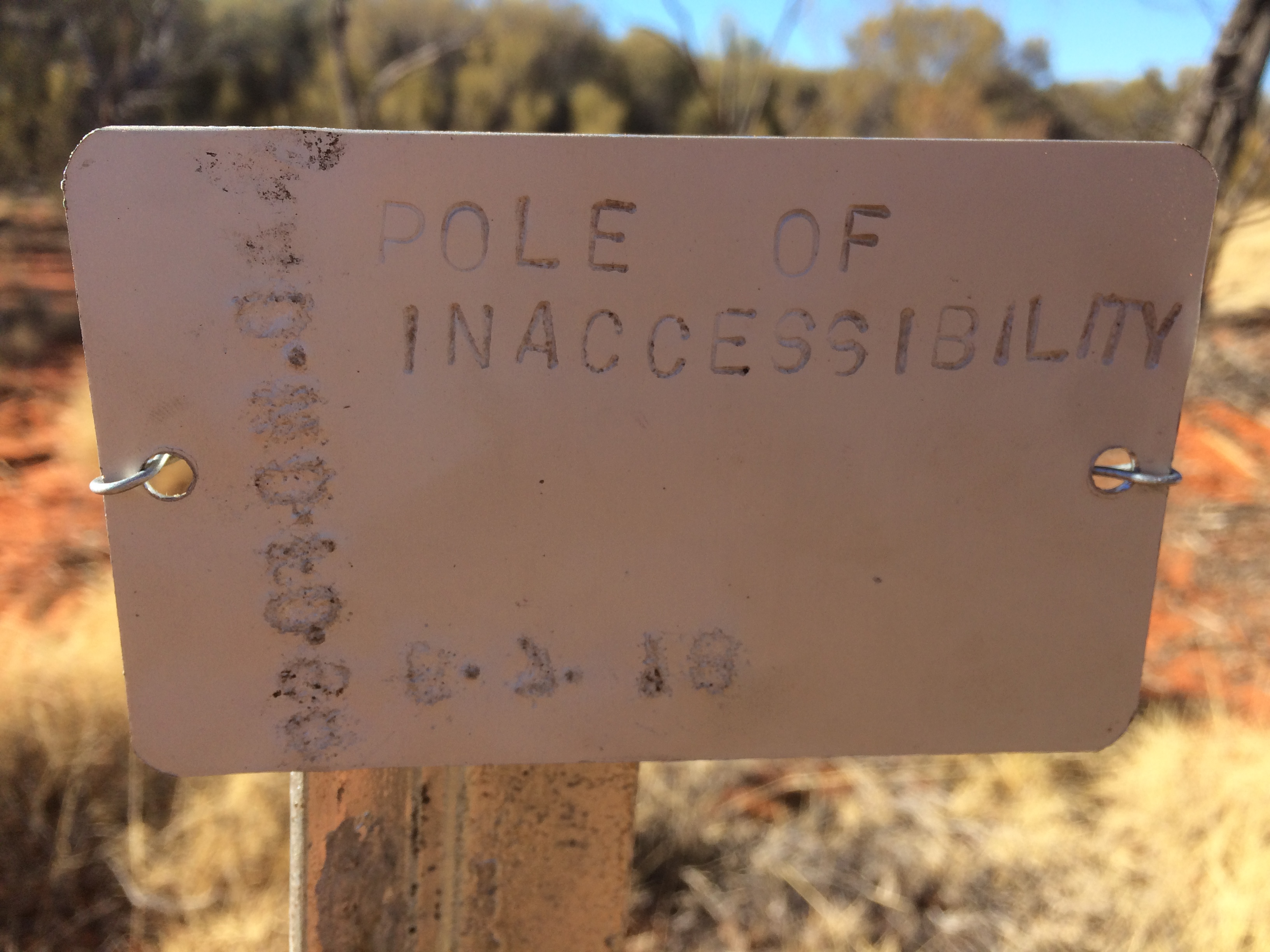
Australian Pole of Inaccessibility

In Australia, the continental pole of inaccessibility is located at 23.17°S 132.27°E 920 km (570 mi) from the nearest coastline, approximately 161 km (100 miles) west-northwest of Alice Springs. The nearest town is Papunya, Northern Territory, about 30 km (19 mi) west-southwest of the pole.

== Methods of calculation ==
As detailed below, several factors determine how a pole is calculated using computer modeling.

Poles are calculated with respect to a particular coastline dataset. Currently used datasets are the GSHHG (Global Self-consistent, Hierarchical, High-resolution Geography Database) as well as OpenStreetMap (OSM) planet dumps. The GSHHG claims 500-meter precision for 90% of identifiable coastal features, while the volunteer-built OSM gives no such guarantee but nevertheless has "characteristics suggesting accuracy".

Next, a distance function must be determined for calculating distances between coastlines and potential Poles. Some works tended to project data onto planes or perform spherical calculations; more recently, other works have used different algorithms and high-performance computing with ellipsoidal calculations.

Finally, an optimization algorithm must be developed. Several works use the 2007 adaptive grid method of Garcia-Castellanos and Lombardo. In this method, a rectangular grid of, e.g., 21×21 points is created. Each point's distance from the coastline is determined and the point farthest from the coast identified. The grid is then recentered on this point and shrunk by some factor. This process iterates until the grid becomes very small (e.g. at 100-meter precision). Some authors claim this method could sink into a local minimum. A more recent method from 2019, B9-Hillclimbing by Richard Barnes, uses a polyhedron in 3D space to find initial points evenly spaced by 100 kilometers. These points are then grouped; the more "unique" points are subject to numerical optimization (hill climbing, simulated annealing) for the farthest distance, accelerated by a 3D Cartesian point cloud. Rees, Gerrish et al. (2021) showed that the two methods produced results that agree with each other to within a few meters.

To date, there has been no meta-study of the various works and their algorithms and datasets. However, successive works have compared themselves with previous calculations and claimed improvement. For example, Garcia-Castellanos and Lombardo in 2007 were able to find hundred-kilometer errors in the "traditional" Eurasian PIA calculated by Crane and Crane in 1987. Gareth Rees, Robert Headland et al., using the same method in 2014, updated the arctic PIA by over 200 kilometers. Barnes's work in 2019, which improved upon the method and the dataset used, was able to improve the Garcia-Castellanos and Lombardo South American PIA by 50 kilometers, showing that bad coastline data caused an error of 57 kilometers in their reported PIA-to-coast distance.

== List of poles of inaccessibility ==
Poles of Inaccessibility, as determined by some authors, are listed in the table below. This list is incomplete and may not capture all works done to date.

Poles of inaccessibility as calculated by various authors
Pole	Location	Distance from coast (km)	Dataset	Projection	Method	Reference
Africa	5.65°N 26.17°E	1,814	GSHHS 1996	Sphere	Adaptive Grid	Garcia-Castellanos (2007)
Africa	5.6413°N 26.1533°E	1,814.5158	GSHHG v2.3.6 (L1)	WGS84	B9-Hillclimbing	Barnes (2019)
Africa	5.6589°N 26.1295°E	1,815.4150	OpenStreetMap	WGS84	B9-Hillclimbing	Barnes (2019)
Antarctica	82°06′S 54°58′E	1,301	? Traditional	?	?	Soviet site (1958)
Antarctica	77.3963°S 105.3855°E	1,136.2129	GSHHG v2.3.6 (L1+L6). Erroneous.	WGS84	B9-Hillclimbing	Barnes (2019)
Antarctica	78.2633°S 103.6340°E	1,273.2928	GSHHG v2.3.6 (L1+L5). Erroneous.	WGS84	B9-Hillclimbing	Barnes (2019)
Antarctica	83.904°S 64.890°E	1,590.36	ADDv7.2 "Outer"	WGS84	B9-Hillclimbing	Rees (2021)
Antarctica	83.610°S 53.720°E	1,179.40	ADDv7.2 "Inner"	WGS84	B9-Hillclimbing	Rees (2021)
Arctic Pole	85.802°N 176.149°E	1,008	GSHHG 2014	WGS84	Adaptive Grid	Rees (2014)
Arctic Pole	85.7911°N 176.2386°E	1,008.9112	OpenStreetMap	WGS84	B9-Hillclimbing	Barnes (2019)
Arctic Pole	85.8015°N 176.1423°E	1,007.6777	GSHHG v2.3.6 (L1)	WGS84	B9-Hillclimbing	Barnes (2019)
Atlantic Ocean	24.1851°N 43.3704°W	2,033.8849	OpenStreetMap	WGS84	B9-Hillclimbing	Barnes (2019)
Atlantic Ocean	24.1923°N 43.3728°W	2,033.5187	GSHHG v2.3.6 (L1)	WGS84	B9-Hillclimbing	Barnes (2019)
Australia	23.17°S 132.27°E	928 (Note: Claimed; actually 915.6601 in GSHHG v2.3.6.)	GSHHS 1996	Sphere	Adaptive Grid	Garcia-Castellanos (2007)
Australia	23°2′S 132°10′E	not claimed	SF53-13	?	Planar map	Geoscience Australia (2014)
Australia	23.1732°S 132.2759°E	925.4459	GSHHG v2.3.6 (L1)	WGS84	B9-Hillclimbing	Barnes (2019)
Australia	23.1948°S 132.1727°E	921.9290	OpenStreetMap	WGS84	B9-Hillclimbing	Barnes (2019)
Eurasia 1	45.28°N 88.14°E	2,514	GSHHS 1996	Sphere	Adaptive Grid	Garcia-Castellanos (2007)
Eurasia 1	45.3413°N 88.2483°E	2,513.9415	GSHHG v2.3.6 (L1)	WGS84	B9-Hillclimbing	Barnes (2019)
Eurasia 1	45.4435°N 88.3172°E	2,509.9536	OpenStreetMap	WGS84	B9-Hillclimbing	Barnes (2019)
Eurasia 2	44.29°N 82.19°E	2,510	GSHHS 1996	Sphere	Adaptive Grid	Garcia-Castellanos (2007)
Eurasia 2	44.3184°N 82.1144°E	2,509.9685	GSHHG v2.3.6 (L1)	WGS84	B9-Hillclimbing	Barnes (2019)
Eurasia 2	44.6740°N 83.9694°E	2,505.2134	OpenStreetMap	WGS84	B9-Hillclimbing	Barnes (2019)
Great Britain	52.65°N 1.56°W	108	GSHHS 1996	Sphere	Adaptive Grid	Garcia-Castellanos (2007)
Great Britain	52.0141°N 0.9640°W	114.4462	OpenStreetMap	WGS84	B9-Hillclimbing	Barnes (2019)
Great Britain	52.6552°N 1.5641°W	108.0925	GSHHG v2.3.6 (L1)	WGS84	B9-Hillclimbing	Barnes (2019)
Greenland	76.50°N 41.0°W	469	GSHHS 1996	Sphere	Adaptive Grid	Garcia-Castellanos (2007)
Greenland	75.9660°N 40.4239°W	471.9905	GSHHG v2.3.6 (L1)	WGS84	B9-Hillclimbing	Barnes (2019)
Greenland	76.0305°N 40.3902°W	474.2257	OpenStreetMap	WGS84	B9-Hillclimbing	Barnes (2019)
Indian Ocean	47.6319°S 99.9677°E	1,940.8913	OpenStreetMap	WGS84	B9-Hillclimbing	Barnes (2019)
Indian Ocean	47.7347°S 100.0547°E	1,943.3848	GSHHG L1	WGS84	B9-Hillclimbing	Barnes (2019)
Madagascar	18.33°S 46.67°E	260	GSHHS 1996	Sphere	Adaptive Grid	Garcia-Castellanos (2007)
Madagascar	18.3382°S 46.6663°E	259.5957	GSHHG v2.3.6 (L1)	WGS84	B9-Hillclimbing	Barnes (2019)
Madagascar	18.2645°S 46.7003°E	264.0657	OpenStreetMap	WGS84	B9-Hillclimbing	Barnes (2019)
North America	43.46°N 101.97°W	1,639 (Note: Claimed; actually 1629.7740 in GSHHG v2.3.6.)	GSHHS 1996	Sphere	Adaptive Grid	Garcia-Castellanos (2007)
North America	43.3764°N 102.0111°W	1,639.6549	GSHHG v2.3.6 (L1)	WGS84	B9-Hillclimbing	Barnes (2019)
North America	43.4370°N 102.0101°W	1,643.7562	OpenStreetMap	WGS84	B9-Hillclimbing	Barnes (2019)
Pacific Ocean (Point Nemo)	48.89°S 123.45°W	2,690	GSHHS 1996	Sphere	Adaptive Grid	Garcia-Castellanos (2007)
Pacific Ocean (Point Nemo)	49.0031°S 123.3920°W	2,701.1721	OpenStreetMap	WGS84	B9-Hillclimbing	Barnes (2019)
Pacific Ocean (Point Nemo)	49.0273°S 123.4345°W	2,704.7991	GSHHG v2.3.6 (L1)	WGS84	B9-Hillclimbing	Barnes (2019)
South America	14.05°S 56.85°W	1,517 (Note: Claimed; actually 1449.9471 in GSHHG v2.3.6.)	GSHHS 1996	Sphere	Adaptive Grid	Garcia-Castellanos (2007)
South America 1	14.3902°S 56.9922°W	1,490.5321	GSHHG v2.3.6 (L1)	WGS84	B9-Hillclimbing	Barnes (2019)
South America 1	6.3248°S 63.1885°W	1,511.6636	OpenStreetMap	WGS84	B9-Hillclimbing	Barnes (2019)
South America 2	10.7342°S 59.2126°W	1,467.2206	OpenStreetMap	WGS84	B9-Hillclimbing	Barnes (2019)
South America 2	5.0537°S 65.5487°W	1,476.4901	GSHHG v2.3.6 (L1)	WGS84	B9-Hillclimbing	Barnes (2019)

ArcGIS personnel posted a webpage showing poles of inaccessibility in 2015, with their calculations based on a flat Earth. The results are too inaccurate to be included here.

== See also ==
- Antipodes
- Extremes on Earth
- Geographical pole
- Geographical centre
- Land and water hemispheres
- List of mainland settlements that are inaccessible by road
- Pole of Inaccessibility research station
