= List of presidents of HUR =

The following is a list of presidents of HUR, the Russian handball governing body.

	Name	Nationality	Term
1.	Alexander Borisovich Kozhukhov	(Soviet Union) (Kazakh Soviet Socialist Republic) (Russia)	1992–2004
2.	Vladimir Maksimov	(Soviet Union) (Russian Soviet Federative Socialist Republic) (Russia)	2004-Present
