= Aleksandr Kozhukhov =

Russian handball player (1942–2008)

Personal information
- Full name: Aleksandr Borisovich Kozhukhov
- Born: 3 June 1942 Shubarkuduk, Aktobe Province, Kazakh SSR, USSR
- Died: 4 September 2008 (aged 66) Moscow, Russia
- Height: 1.96 m (6 ft 5 in)

Sport
- Sport: Handball
- Position: Playmaker

Senior clubs
- Years: Team
- 1957–1977: Avangard Lvov
- –: SKA Lvov
- –: Moscow Aviation Institute
National team
Years	Team	Apps	(Gls)
1967–1977	USSR	20	(30)

Teams managed
- 1977–1992: USSR

Aleksandr Borisovich Kozhukhov (Russian: Александр Борисович Кожухов; 3 June 1942 – 4 September 2008) was "The USSR Merited Master of Sports", "The Merited Coach of the USSR national handball team", and the "USSR Merited Figure of Physical Culture". He was a Russian, Soviet handball player, who became president of the USSR Handball Federation (1990–1992) and a president of the Handball Union of Russia (1992–2004) before being the Honorary President of the Handball Union of Russia (2004–2008).

== Life and career ==
Kozhukhov was born in Shubarkuduk village of Aktobe Province of modern Kazakhstan. He started his handball career in 1957 as an amateur player, then he was invited to join Avangard L'vov a second division handball team in the USSR Handball Championship.

Aleksandr stayed for eleven years in Lvov city of modern Ukraine playing for Avangard Lvov and SKA Lvov before he moved to MIA Moscow in 1968 where he started a career, winning the USSR Handball Championship for five times.

In 1967 Kozhukhov was called up to the national team when he made his first appearance during the Military Spartakiad of the Friendly Armies of the Socialist Countries and a third-place finish for the USSR. He also participated in the 1970 World Men's Handball Championship in France, finishing ninth, coming third in the group stage after Sweden and East Germany.

Kozhukhov retired in 1977 and became the head coach for the USSR handball national team.

Aleksandr remained as the USSR handball national team head coach until 1992 even after he was elected by the Congress of the Handball Union of the USSR to be the president of the Union until the dissolution of the USSR. In 1992 the second conference of the Handball Union of Russia was held in Volgograd, and Sasha was elected the first president of the Handball Union of the independat Russian Federation following Vladimir Maksimov the president of the Handball Union of RSFSR. In 1993 Sasha became a member of the Executive Committee of the Russian Olympic Committee, till he finally became the Honorary President of the Handball Union of Russia in 2004.

Kozhukhov died in 2008.

== Honours ==
=== MIA Moscow ===
- Champions of the USSR Handball Championship: 1968, 1970, 1972, 1974, 1975

=== USSR ===
- Champion of the Trade Unions Spartakiade in 1969
- Bronze medal of the Military Spartakiade of Friendly Armies of Socialist Countries in 1967

=== HUR President ===
- IHF Ring of Honour
- Silver Olympic Order
- Hans Baumann Trophy in 2002

=== Individual ===
- Medal "For Distinguished Labour" (Russian: За трудовое отличие)
- Medal "For Labour Valour" (Russian: За трудовую доблесть)
- Order of the Badge of Honor (Russian: Орден "Знак Почета")
- Order of Honour (Russian: Орден "Почета")
- Order For Merit to the Fatherland (4th Class) (Russian: Орден "За заслуги перед Отечеством" - 4 степени)
