= Paul Landry =

Canadian polar explorer (born 1955)

Paul Landry M.B. (born September 6, 1955) is a French-Canadian polar explorer, author, and adventurer who is the only paid man to ever reach three Geographical poles in a single year.

== Biography ==
A Franco-Ontarian from Smooth Rock Falls in the Northeastern part of the province, Paul Landry spent his boyhood summers canoeing the area's rivers and his winters snowshoeing and cross-country skiing. He received a diploma in Power Engineering from the Southern Alberta Institute of Technology and studied social sciences at the University of Western Ontario. Between the age of 20 and 22, Landry travelled and worked throughout Europe and the Middle East then functioned for a number of years as a Program Director for Canadian Outward Bound community projects during which time he co-authored their publications: Basic River Canoeing and the Wilderness Canoeing Handbook. He also was the editor of On Thin Ice, A Woman's Journey to the North Pole. He eventually married and had two children and settled in Baffin Island where he used to operate a polar guiding business and runs polar training courses for explorers. He used to be the owner of a professional dog sledging team.

As an explorer/adventurer, Paul Landry has paddled numerous rivers in North America and was a member of three separate mountaineering expeditions to Peru, Bolivia and Argentina. With seven, he holds the world record for North and South Pole expeditions.

In September 2003, Landry and friend Peter Gladden of Hudson, Ohio were decorated with the Medal of Bravery by the Governor General of Canada for risking their lives to rescue four hikers who were overcome by the current while crossing a fast-flowing river in Auyuittuq National Park on Baffin Island.

Landry was part of the ski team in the 2004/2005 Sir Ranulph Fiennes-backed "Invesco Perpetual Trans-Antarctica Challenge". He is participating in his fourth North Pole expedition with Adventure Ecology's "Top of the world" Mission 1 expedition. Part of a four-person team that included his 20-year-old daughter, Sarah McNair Landry, along with Britons David Mayer de Rothschild and Martin Hartley, he skied, walked, swam, dog sledded, and snow-kited 1800 km (1240 Miles) across the Arctic Ocean via the North from Cape Arctichesky in Russia to Ellesmere Island in Canada.

In January 2007, Landry as part of Team N2i was acknowledged in the Guinness World Records as being the first team to reach the Pole of Inaccessibility (Antarctic research station) by foot and kite skiing.

== Polar expedition record ==
- November 2006 - January 2007 : Team N2i (Rory Sweet, Henry Cookson, Rupert Longsdon) - Kite Ski Expedition to the Pole of Inaccessibility
- November 2004 – January 2005 : Antarctic Traverse via the South Pole
- June 2003 : Greenland Ice Cap Crossing
- South Pole:
  - November 2002 – January 2003
  - November 2001 – January 2002
- North Pole:
  - March 2002 – May 2002
  - March 2001 – May 2001
  - March 2000 – April 2000
  - April 1998 : Magnetic North Pole Expedition
- February 1990 – June 1990 : Baffin Island Expedition
