= Ice Warriors =

Ice Warriors may refer to:

- Ice Warrior, alien race in the BBC television series Doctor Who
- The Ice Warriors, Doctor Who story in which the alien race makes its debut
- Ice Warriors (game show), a TV game show on ITV
- Global Warrior Project, a long-term project founded by arctic explorer Jim McNeill
