= Jim McNeill =

British explorer (born 1960)

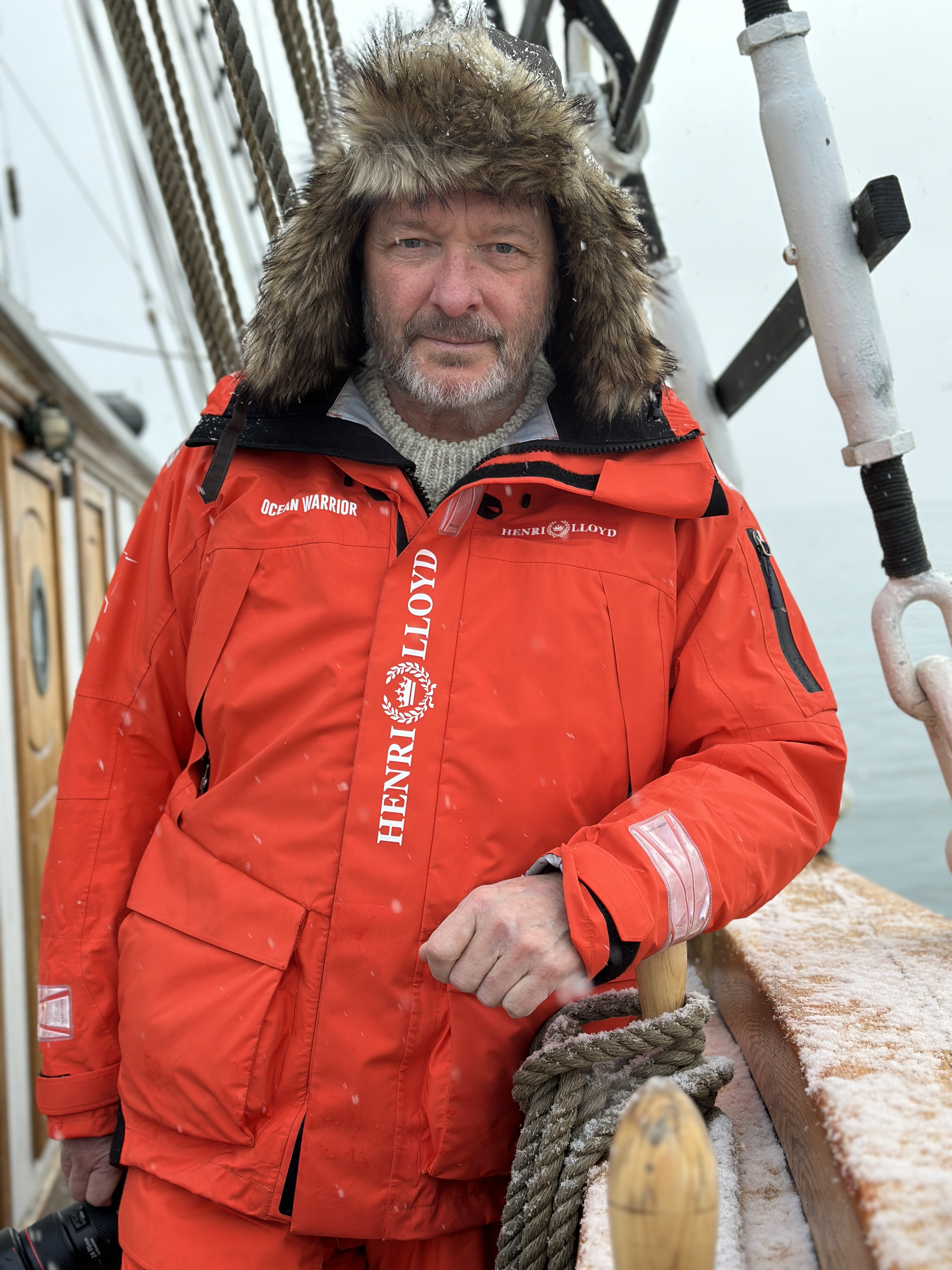
- Born: 18 December 1960 (age 65); Chipping Barnet
- Known for: Polar Exploration
- Scientific career
- Fields: Polar exploration; Desert exploration; Environmental research; Global warming; Citizen science
- Workplaces: Global Warrior Project; Sea Research Society

Jim McNeill is a British polar explorer, former scientist, presenter and keynote speaker, with nearly 40 years of exploration in the World's extreme environments.

In 2001 McNeill founded Ice Warrior Project, an organisation which gave "ordinary" people the opportunity to become modern-day polar explorers and achieve extraordinary feats of endurance and endeavour on purposeful, worthwhile expeditions of a citizen science nature. In October 2022 the Ice Warrior Project was expanded to become Global Warrior Project to include the other extreme environments Ocean, Desert, Mountain and Jungle.

The next domain was the ocean and the soft launch of Ocean Warrior in January 2023. Tasked with finding out what is happening to the oceans, the programme will consist of three vessels undertaking a total of 20,000 nautical miles of sailing expeditions starting in June 2025 and repeated every year for the next 10 years. These will be known as the #ResoluteExpeditions and will bring together a mix of scientists, students and citizen scientists to conduct ocean exploration. Core partners to date include: Plymouth Marine Laboratory, Marine Biological Association and the University of Plymouth.

== Early life and education ==
Born in 1960, in Chipping Barnet, North London, James Edward McNeill is the middle son of Irish immigrant, Richard McNeill and English nurse, Ann Elizabeth McNeill (née Bright). He describes his upbringing as “humble”, living for most of his formative years on a council estate in the Underhill region of Barnet.

McNeill attended Queen Elizabeth's Boys’ School in Barnet where he was not interested in matters academic and, instead, he concentrated on sporting prowess and disruptive practical jokes. Hoping to improve his academic performance, in 1977 his school sent him on a winter Outward Bound Course located in the heart of the Lake District, at Eskdale. Here, despite his youth (aged 16 years), he was put in charge of Young Patrol where he excelled in every aspect of outdoor pursuits, being described as a “bold and fearless climber, he proved to be very tenacious when faced with difficulties and persevered until they were overcome”. This early experience ignited Jim's passion for the outdoors and has led him to be an active rock climber and mountaineer ever since becoming a callout member of several mountain rescue teams in the military, Lake District and Scotland and also a mountaineering instructor for London Borough of Harrow and London Borough of Barnet, Youth and Communities instructing groups of underprivileged youths including their participation in the Duke of Edinburgh Award Scheme.

== Career ==
Despite scraping enough A levels to attend university he chose, instead, to write to 17 scientific establishments for a position in science. A week later he was employed by The Grassland Research Institute, Hurley, Berkshire where he worked in soil science identifying agricultural practices effecting ammonia volatilization from urea, groundwater pollution and ozone depletion over Antarctica as a result of ammonium nitrate fertilisers.

With a career spanning environmental science, the British Army, marketing communications and fire & rescue services (where he specialised in road traffic accidents and spent 10 years as a fire officer for the Royal Household) McNeill has selected, trained and led successful teams from corporations, through high risk polar expeditions, to critical lifesaving situations.

== Polar and Expedition Career ==
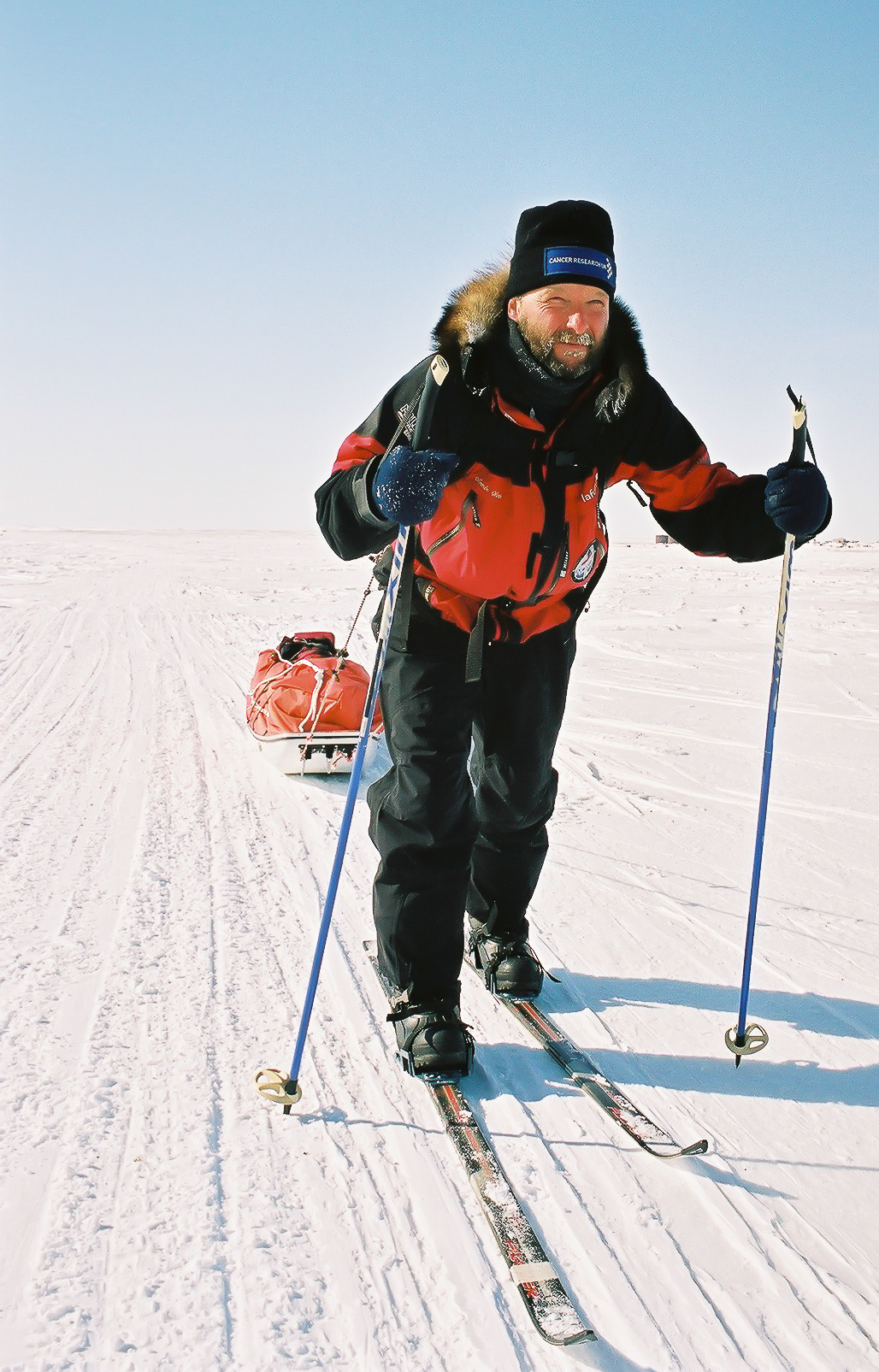
Jim McNeill ski-ing across the Arctic sea ice

He has trained and guided many groups to the Polar Regions, including BBC film crews. He has clocked up hundreds of days solo travel, travelling as a safety consultant for film crews and living and learning from the Inuit covering thousands of miles either on foot, skis, snowmobile, by yacht or by dog sled. His expeditions have taken him to the Antarctica via the Southern Ocean (South Orkney Islands), mainland Canada, mainland Norway, Svalbard, Baffin Island, Cornwallis Island, Bathurst Island, Ellesmere Island and the Arctic Ocean for his attempts to reach the North Pole of Inaccessibility.

He spent over 170 days during the course of three separate expeditions on Ellesmere Island; (i) to the Geomagnetic North Pole via Sverdrup Pass from Eureka up the eastern coast to the Darling Peninsula (ii) following a pack of eight wolves and (iii) following three adults and six cubs on both occasions with a BBC film crew.

From 2001 at his base in Resolute Bay and more recently since 2010 at his base in Longyearbyen, Svalbard Jim has trained ordinary people to become polar competent. To date he has trained over 450 people and led 7 flagship expeditions.

== Northern Pole of Inaccessibility ==
McNeill has attempted to reach the Northern Pole of Inaccessibility on two occasions. In 2003, he contracted a flesh-eating disease (Necrotising Fasciitis) in his left ankle and was unable to leave base camp in Resolute Bay, Canada. His second attempt in 2006 was thwarted by disintegrating sea ice, some 130 miles into the journey on Day 17.

== Safety, Logistics and Performance Training Consultancy ==
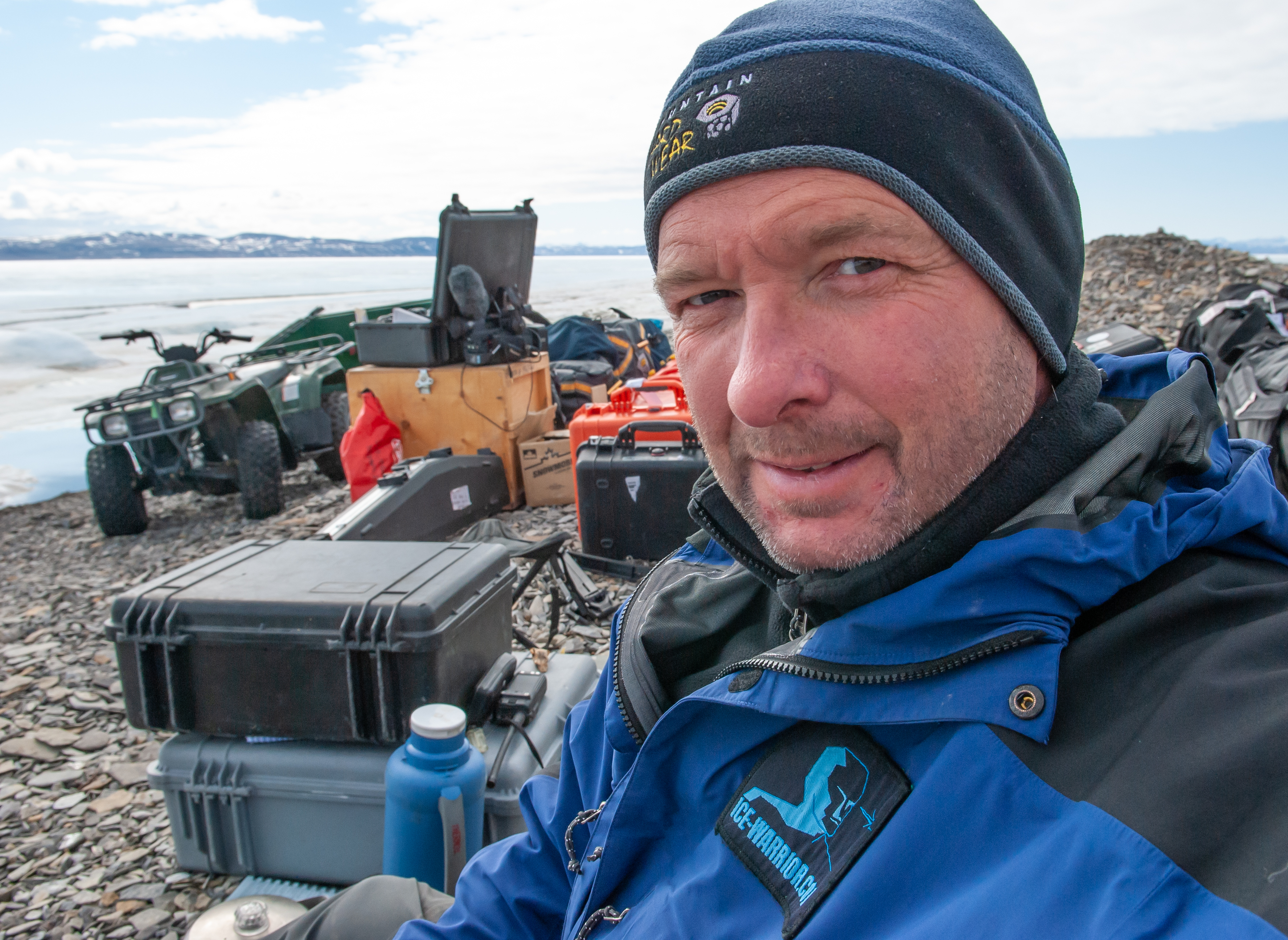
Jim McNeill as safety consultant, logistician and guide for the filming of BBC Frozen Planet

Jim has been credited for his roles as safety consultant adviser, trainer and expedition leader on numerous television and film productions including Frozen Planet, Human Planet, BBC Natural World, Channel 4 - Predators in Paradise and Marvel Entertainment - Captain America. He was the expedition leader for BBC Scotland - The Last Explorers series following in the footsteps of William Speirs Bruce which involved a crossing of the infamous Southern Ocean via Drake's Passage with Neil Oliver in a yacht called Pelagic skippered by Skip Novak.

== Citizen Science ==
McNeill expeditions give him regular opportunities to monitor polar bear populations for the Norwegian Polar Institute, as well as putting together a yearly scientific program for scientists to monitor the effects of climate change. He is Vice president - Arctic Expeditions for Sea Research Society.

He has presented to the former president of Bolivia, Evo Morales at the Bolivian Indigenous People's Climate Change Conference.

== Icons Interviewed ==
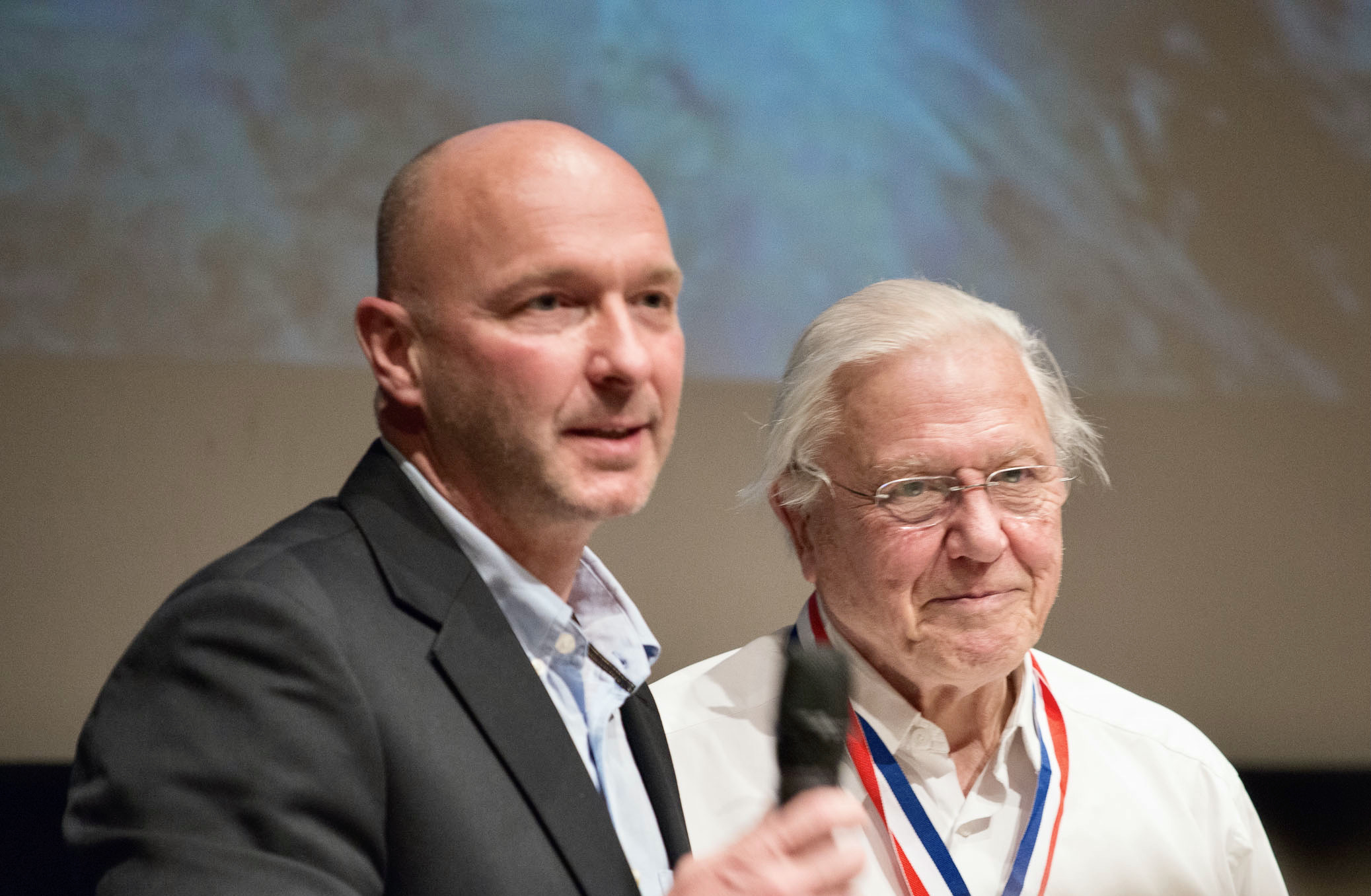
Jim McNeill interviewing Sir David Attenborough on stage

Jim is host of the Icons Interviewed series of intimate events featuring iconic people Jim has some connection with.

So far he has interviewed David Attenborough, Ranulph Fiennes, David Mearns, Pat Falvey, Chris Bonington, Felicity Aston, and Robin Knox-Johnston at venues such as The Natural History Museum, the Royal Geographical Society, the Royal Aeronautical Society, HQS Wellington and The Little Ship Club.

== Personal life ==
In 1980 he married Dr Ann McNeill (née Jukes) - they had two daughters, Kirsty and Helen, and two grandchildren, Lachlan and Louis. He later married Lorraine McNeill (née Moore) - they had a son, Mac. Jim now lives with his wife Sam McNeill in the Scottish Highlands where together they run the Global Warrior Project.

== Video ==
- Training in the Northwest Passage
- Solo Arctic Ocean
