= Dmitry Shparo =

Russian Arctic explorer, endurance skier, and author

- Dmitry Shparo during the Bering Strait crossing
- Born: August 23, 1941 (age 85); Moscow, Russia
- Known for: Arctic explorer; endurance skier

Dmitry Shparo (born August 23, 1941) is a Russian Arctic explorer and endurance skier. He is internationally known for twice reaching the North Pole on snow skis.

In 1979, Shparo led the first ski expedition from Eurasia to the North Pole. In 1988, he completed a full traverse across the Arctic Ocean from Russia to Canada via the North Pole. In 1998, Shparo and his son, Matvey, became the first people in modern times to ski across the Bering Strait, from Russia into North America.

== Early life ==
Dmitry Shparo was born in Moscow, Russia, in 1941, shortly after the Soviet Union was invaded by German troops. Shparo was the son of Igor and Nina (née Gimers) Shparo. His father was a journalist and a fiction writer, while his mother was a mathematician. Shparo's grandfather was declared an "enemy of the nation" in 1927 and sent to a labor camp in Siberia, never to be heard from again.

In 1953, following Joseph Stalin's death, Shparo's mother got a job at the Institute of Applied Mechanics, where she was involved in calculating the trajectories of both the first Soviet cruise missile and the first artificial satellite, Sputnik.

Educational background

In 1967, Shparo graduated from the Moscow State University, earning a PhD in Mathematics. Following graduation, he began teaching full-time at the Moscow Institute of Steel and Alloys (MISIS).

== Professional background ==
=== Arctic exploration ===
Training for Greenland

In 1970, Shparo traveled from Lake Taymyr, the largest freshwater body in Eurasia north of the Arctic Circle, to Cape Cheluskin (the northernmost point of Asia) via the islands of Komsomolskaya Pravda in the Laptev Sea. Following completion of this expedition, Shparo was recognized by the national press and news affiliates. Newspapers published his journals and announced their sponsorship of a new polar expedition, with Dmitry Shparo leading the way.

In 1973, Shparo developed an interest in Arctic exploration. At this time, explorers were viewed with a great deal of suspicion in the Soviet Union. Their routes had to be approved by the Communist Party committees and local KGB offices. Following Soviet approval, Shparo led several low-profile expeditions up the outskirts of Russia.

Soviet authorities were taking the Arctic Region seriously. The Polar Ocean was a place d'armes of the ongoing military competition with the US. The Kremlin wanted to see victories in this battlefield, not defeats. The stakes of the proposed ski-trip to the North Pole were such that the final decision rested with the Politburo. Its response was laconic: the expedition to the North Pole was "unsuitable and pointless". In March 1979, Shparo left to the North Pole on skis secretly, without the Politburo's permission.

In late April, when news of the flagrant disobedience finally reached the Politburo, its conformist majority was outraged. Kremlin leadership urged the Chief of the KGB, Yuri Andropov, and the Minister of Defense, Dmitriy Ustinov, to send out military helicopters in order to return the escapees and punish them accordingly. Shparo and his teammates were halfway there and Mihail Suslov, the Party's chief ideologist, suggested that chances of their successful arrival to the Pole were quite high. Shparo was allowed to finish his trip, and reached the North Pole on May 31, in 1979.

Soon after Shparo's name went into the Guinness World Records, he undertook a new trip, crossing the Arctic Ocean during the Arctic night in total darkness. He walked in the night for two months, from the drifting polar station "North Pole-26" to another drifting polar station "North Pole-27". His 700 km (430 mi) route lay through constantly drifting and crashing ice, and temperatures dropped as low as −70 °C (−94 °F). In February 15, 1986 he arrived at the pole of relative inaccessibility, becoming the first man to reach it on skis.

His projects include an expedition to Franz Josef Land where the winter home of Fridtjof Nansen was found; an expedition to the Commander Islands in Kamchatka, where the grave of Vitus Bering, a world-famous navigator, was discovered, and many others.

=== Goodwill ambassador ===
As a mathematician, Shparo insisted that the North Pole, as an ever-shifting spot, existed only as a mathematical concept. His trips also had a practical component: Shparo had become one of the earliest Soviet ambassadors of goodwill to the West, before glasnost and perestroika.

In 1988, Shparo co-led the Soviet-Canadian expedition, first to cross Arctic Ocean from Russia via the North Pole to Canada, lifting the Ice Curtain.

In 1989, Shparo and his American colleague, Paul Schurke, led the Bering Bridge Expedition from Siberia to Alaska in an attempt to reconnect Arctic cultures separated by the Cold War. Until World War II, the Inuit of Siberia and Alaska had traveled back and forth across the Bering Strait to hunt walrus and visit relatives. However, in 1948, the Stalin and the Truman governments locked down the border. Shparo and Schurke asked the Kremlin and the White House to open the border to a sled dog expedition.

Along with the preparation of dogs and sleds, Shparo and Schurke had drawn a protocol of intentions and talked the Governors of both Alaska and Chukotka into signing it on the ice on the Bering Strait. According to this protocol, native Chukotkans and Alaskans were allowed to travel, hunt and trade freely again. The protocol was signed at the end of April 1989, several months before the Berlin Wall collapsed. The border was reopened and presidents Bush and Gorbachev praised Shparo and Schurke for their achievement. Disintegration of the Ice Curtain did not receive the same high-profile treatment as the collapse of the Berlin Wall, yet the main goal of the expedition had been achieved: Inuit families across the border were reunited.

In 1996, Shparo attempted to cross the Bering Strait again – this time on skis and in the company of his two sons. The expedition failed when overnight the coastal ice had carried the sleeping adventurers 16 mi (26 km) away into the open Bering Sea. Shparo, conceding defeat, set off the rescue beacon, and awaited rescue. A United States Coast Guard (USCG) C-130 Hercules was dispatched from Kodiak to pin down the location. To the horror of the USCG they found approximately 20 polar bears, and the group was feared lost until they were finally spotted, and rescued by USCG helicopters from Nome. In 1997 a second attempt failed when Nikita, the oldest of Shparo's children, fell through the weak ice and sustained severe frostbite. In 1998, in the course of the third attempt, Dmitry and Matvey Shparo managed to successfully cross the Bering Strait, becoming the first people to do so by skis and thus securing another spot in the Guinness World Records and personal congratulations from presidents Clinton and Yeltsin.

In 2005, Prince Albert of Monaco chose Dmitry Shparo, along with son Matvey as partners and advisers in his April 2006 North Pole dog-sled expedition aimed to highlight global warming and to commemorate his great-great-grandfather, Prince Albert I, who made four Arctic trips a century ago.

== Disability advocacy ==
Influenced by Rick Hansen, a Canadian paraplegic athlete and activist for people with spinal cord injuries, Dmitry Shparo founded Adventure Club in 1989. It is a Moscow-based charity foundation, that in the past 23 years sponsored numerous adventures for disabled athletes and disadvantaged children worldwide. Under the personal leadership of Shparo, blind, deaf, amputee, and quadriplegic people have ascended mountain peaks and crossed deserts, including the ice ones.

=== Adventures for people with disabilities ===
- 1991 – a marathon in wheelchairs: Moscow – Kiev – Kryvyi Rih, 1,400 km (870 mi)
- 1992 – marathon in wheelchairs, Vladivostok – Saint Petersburg, 11,000 km (6,800 mi)
- 1993 – marathon in wheelchairs, St. Petersburg – Almaty, along 15 countries of Commonwealth of Independent States and Baltic states, 9,000 km (5,600 mi)
- 1995 – an ascent of the Mount Kazbek 5,047 m (16,558 ft), the third highest mountain in Georgia, by disabled sportsmen in wheelchairs
- 1996 – the ecological marathon in wheelchairs Semey – Chelyabinsk – Chernobyl, 10,000 km (6,200 mi)
- 1997 – an ascent of Mount Kilimanjaro, Tanzania, 5,895 m (19,341 ft), made by a team of disabled sportsmen
- 2000 – a ski crossing Greenland by a team including an athlete with spinal cord injury
- 2002 – an ascent of Mount McKinley, Alaska, at 6,194 m (20,322 ft) the highest peak in North America by disabled sportsmen in wheelchairs

=== Adventures for children ===
- 1990 – a scientific expedition to Chukotka for the observation of a total solar eclipse
- 1992 – kayak expeditions along rivers in the US and Canada
- 1997 – a scientific expedition to the Chita Oblast for the observation of a total solar eclipse
- 1998 – a youth ecological expedition to Mount Elbrus
- 1999 – a youth ecological expedition to Kamchatka
- 2000–12 – youth ecological camp in the Republic of Karelia

Dmitry Shparo also stood behind the parachute jumps on the North Pole, running races to the top of Europe – Mt. Elbrus, round-the world ZiL truck expedition, Moscow – Uelen – Seattle – Toronto – New York City – London – Kaliningrad – Moscow and circumnavigation in the yacht Apostol Andre. The Cruising Club of America's Bluewater Medal 2001 was awarded to the crew in New York. In 2005 Dmitry Shparo with the World Race Trust co-organized The Great Russian Race - a 15-week, 7,000 mi (11,000 km) charity ultra-marathon relay from Vladivostok – at the intersection of North Korea, Russia, and China, seven time zones east of Moscow – to St. Petersburg – near the border of Finland and Russia. $340,000 were raised for the benefit of abandoned, orphaned, and homeless children in Russia.

== Honors and awards ==
Matvey and Dmitry Shparo (L & R) with the American Ambassador to Russia

In recognition of his polar achievements, Dmitry Shparo has received several honors and awards: the Order of Lenin, the highest national decoration of the former Soviet Union, (other prizewinners include cosmonaut Yuri Gagarin, Fidel Castro, and Nikita Khrushchev), the Order of the Red Banner of Labour, the prestigious UNESCO award, Fair Play, and gold medals from several geographical societies.

== Published works ==
Shparo's career as an author has developed alongside that of explorer. Among his books are A Way to the North, To the Pole! and Three Mysteries of the Arctic. In 2006, Shparo completed a biography of Frederick Cook, defending Cook's achievements and reputation which had been strongly questioned by other historians and biographers.
