= Geologica Acta =

- Discipline: Geology
- Language: English, Spanish

Publication details
- Former name: Acta Geológica Hispánica
- History: 2003–present
- Publisher: University of Barcelona; Instituto de Ciencias de la Tierra Jaume Almera; Institut de Diagnosi Ambiental i Estudis de l'Aigua; Autonomous University of Barcelona (Spain)
- Frequency: Quarterly

Standard abbreviations
- ISO 4: Geol. Acta

Indexing
- ISSN: 1695-6133

Links
- Journal homepage

Geologica Acta is a peer-reviewed open-access scientific journal that covers research in the Earth sciences. It was established in 2003 as a successor to Acta Geológica Hispánica (1966–2002), a locally oriented journal published in Spanish. The journal is published by the University of Barcelona, the Instituto de Ciencias de la Tierra Jaume Almera (CSIC), the Institut de Diagnosi Ambiental i Estudis de l'Aigua (CSIC), and the Autonomous University of Barcelona.

== Abstracting and indexing ==
The journal is abstracted and indexed in:

- Science Citation Index Expanded
- GeoRef
- PASCAL
- BIOSIS Previews
- Latindex
- Scopus
- Geological Abstracts
- Chemical Abstracts
- Redalyc

According to the Journal Citation Reports, the journal has a 2017 impact factor of 0.692.
