= IHF Ring of Honour =

The Ring of Honour may be awarded on special occasions (personal anniversary, selection as the World Handball Player of the Year, etc.) to outstanding individuals for their exceptional contribution to the sport of handball.

The Ring of Honour is made of gold and is specially engraved.

The recipient is selected by the Council at the request of the Executive Committee, and the Ring of Honour is awarded by the IHF President, one of the Vice-Presidents or the Secretary General.

== List of Winners ==
Year	Recipient	Country
1998	Raymond Hahn	France
2000	Alexander Borisovich Kozhukhov	Soviet Union/Russia
2002	Sascha Janzen	Adidas
2002	Jérôme Valcke	Sportfive
2007	Jānis Grīnbergs	Lithuania
2009	Jürg Steib	Switzerland
