= Handball Federation of Russia =

Sports national governing body

Handball Federation of Russia Russian: Федерация гандбола России HFR
- IOC nation: Russian Federation (RUS)
- Sport: Handball
- Other sports: Beach handball
- Official website: rushandball.ru
- Preceding organisations: USSR Handball Federation
- Year of formation: 1989; 37 years ago
- International federation: International Handball Federation (IHF)
- IHF member since: 1992; 34 years ago
- Continental association: European Handball Federation
- National Olympic Committee: Russian Olympic Committee
- President: Sergey Nikolaevich Shishkarev (Russia) (Russia) (Russia)
- Address: Luzhnetskaya nab. 8, Moscow
- Country: Russian Federation
- Secretary General: Lev Voronin (Russia)
- Honorary President: Alexander Borisovich Kozhukhov (Kazakh Soviet Socialist Republic) (Russia) (Russia) (Russia)
- Sponsors: Delo Group; Kempa

The Handball Federation of Russia (Russian: Федерация гандбола России, romanized: Federatsiya gandbola Rossii) commonly known by its acronym, HFR, is the national governing body of handball in Russia. Is a public sports organization with its primary focus centered on the development and promotion of handball. RHF serves as the governing body responsible for organizing and overseeing handball competitions throughout Russia. Furthermore, it plays a crucial role in the management and coordination of the Russian national handball teams.

== History ==
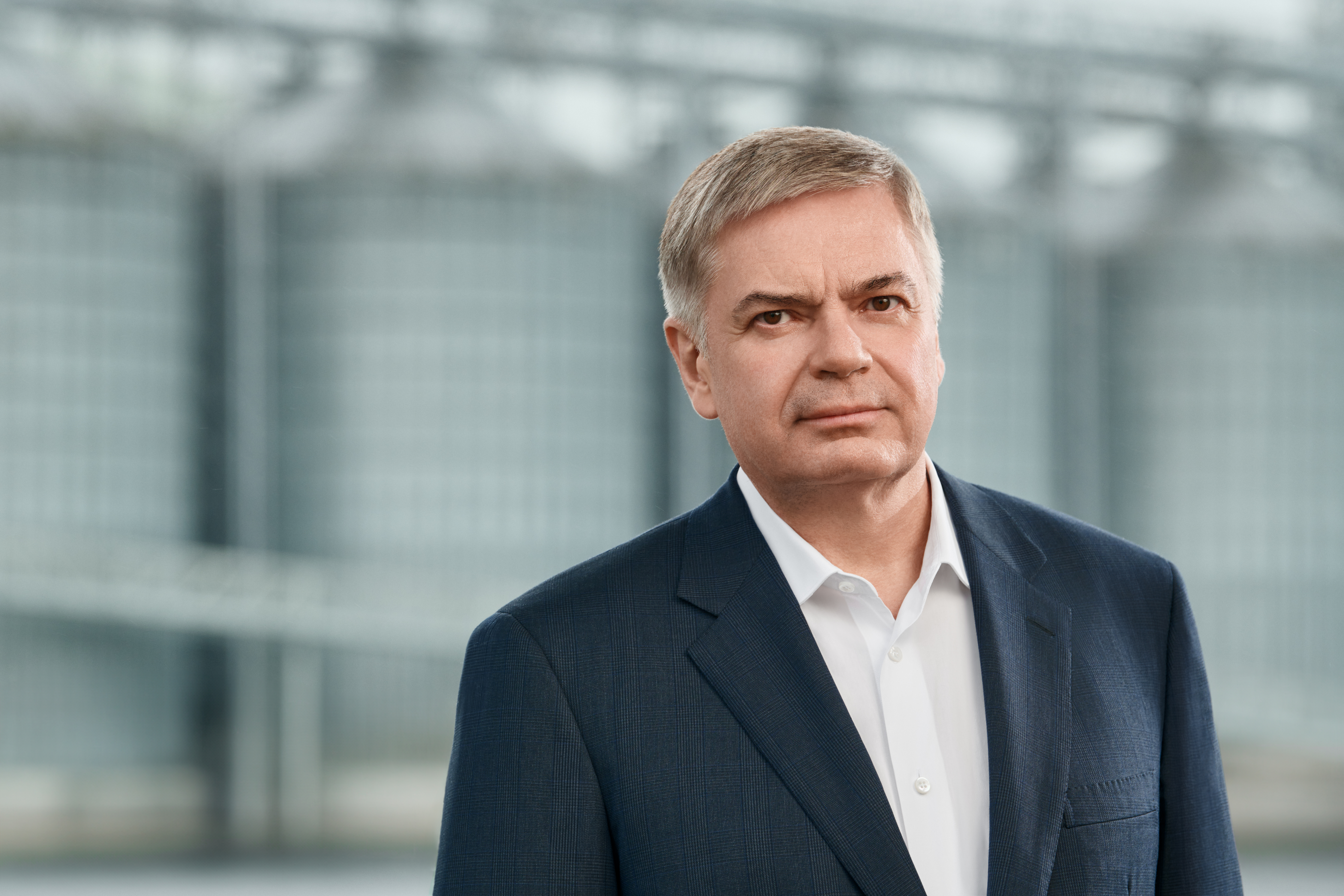
Sergey Shishkarev, Chairman of the Supreme Council of the Russian Handball Federation

In Russia, handball rose to prominence in the early 20th century. The pivotal moment can be traced back to May 2, 1924, when two prominent handball clubs from Moscow met at the Site of (Experimental Demonstration Site of Universal Education) as part of the First All-Union Physical Education Festival of the USSR's Games Day celebration.

The game gained widespread popularity in the post-war years, particularly in two variants: one with 11 players per team and another with 7 players per team. Following the adoption of rules in 1948, the 11x11 version was referred to as “hand-ball”, while the 7x7 version became known as “handball”. Interestingly, even though the rules transitioned to 7x7 in 1962, the term “hand-ball” lingered in the Russian language and remained the official name of the sport until 1990.

In 1955, a public organization was established to promote handball, retaining the name “All-Union Section (Federation) of Handball”. By 1958, the USSR Handball Federation joined the International Handball Federation, enabling sports clubs and national teams of the USSR to participate in international competitions. The Soviet Union men's national handball team was formed in 1960, making its debut at the World Championship in Czechoslovakia in 1964 while the women's national team was established in 1962, subsequently participating in the World Championship held in Romania.

A significant milestone occurred in 1989 with the founding conference of the Union of Handball Players of the RSFSR. Vladimir Maksimov, the 1976 Olympic champion and Honored Master of Sports of the USSR, as well as Honored Coach of the USSR and the RSFSR, was elected as the general director of the conference. Until 1992, the RSFSR Handball Union was part of the USSR Handball Federation, which unified sports federations across all union republics. Following the dissolution of the USSR, the All-Union Federation was dissolved, and on March 2, 1992, the Russian Handball Union (RHU) was established during a founding conference in Volgograd. Alexander Kozhukhov, Honored Master of Sports of the USSR and Honored Coach of the USSR, assumed the role of its first president. Vladimir Maksimov continued as the general director, with Yuri Reznikov, Honorary Master of Sports of the USSR, serving as vice-president, and Boris Makarov, an internationally certified referee, taking on the role of executive secretary. RHU became the legal successor of the All-Union Federation, securing its membership in the International Handball Federation and the European Handball Federation.

Alexander Kozhukhov led RHU from 1992 to 2004, while Vladimir Maksimov retained his position as general director throughout the reporting and election conferences from 1992 to 2008. In 2004, Kozhukhov assumed the role of president of the commission responsible for organizing and overseeing competitions for the International Handball Federation. Consequently, he stepped down from his leadership position in RHU but continued as an advisor to the president and held the honorary title of Union president. In December 2004, Vladimir Grigoriev, Deputy Head of the Federal Agency for Press and Mass Communications and a former youth handball player in Zaporizhzhia, emerged as the sole candidate during the reporting and election conference. He helmed the organization for a single Olympic cycle, serving until November 2008. In January 2009, Boris Aleshin, General Director of AvtoVAZ, assumed the role of RHU's new president. During the reporting and election conference in March 2013, the Perm Krai Handball Federation presented its candidate, Vladimir Nelyubin, the current deputy of the regional Legislative Assembly, who also serves as the head of the Committee for Physical Culture, Sports, and Tourism of the Perm Region and is the president of the city martial arts club “Perm Bears”. Nelyubin defeated Aleshin in the second round of elections. Upon taking office, he initiated a renaming of the organization, leading to the change from the Russian Handball Union to the Russian Handball Federation.

In 2014, at the behest of the Russian Handball Federation, Dmitry Rogozin, Deputy Chairman of the Government of the Russian Federation and a Handball Master of Sports, assumed the role of heading its board of trustees. Come April 2015, there was a change in the Federation's presidency, with Sergei Shishkarev, Deputy Chairman of the Maritime Collegium under the Government of the Russian Federation and a Doctor of Law, stepping into the position.

Fast forward to December 2022, Sergei Shishkarev was elected as vice-president of the Russian Olympic Committee. Then, on February 1, 2023, the primary governing body of RHF, the executive committee, underwent transformation into the Supreme Council, with Sergey Shishkarev taking on the role of chairman.

== Awards ==
The 1972 Summer Games in Munich marked the debut of Soviet handball players in the Olympics. At the 1976 Olympic Games in Montreal, both the men's and women's national teams clinched gold medals. In the history of Olympic handball tournaments, the men's national teams of the USSR and Russia, including the joint team, secured a total of six medals, with five of them being gold. The women's national teams secured 7 medals, including three gold ones.

Alexander Kozhukhov, who led the Russian Handball Union from 1993 to 2002, and Vladimir Maksimov were honored with prestigious awards from the International Olympic Committee – the Silver Olympic Orders – in recognition of their contributions to the development of the international Olympic movement. Additionally, in 1994, 1995, 1997, 1999, 2000, 2001, and 2002, the Russian Handball Union received recognition as the top handball federation in Europe according to the European Handball Federation. In 2015, RHF was bestowed with the highest accolade from the International Handball Federation – the Hans Baumann Trophy.

== Heads ==
- 1989—1992 — Vladimir Salmanovich Maksimov
- 1992—2004 — Alexander Borisovich Kozhukhov
- 2004—2009 — Vladimir Viktorovich Grigoriev
- 2009—2013 — Boris Sergeevich Aleshin
- 2013—2015 — Vladimir Aleksandrovich Nelyubin
- From 2015 to the present — Sergey Nikolaevich Shishkarev

== Best handballers of Russia in the 20th century ==
In 2001, the congress as well as the members of the executive committee of the Handball Union of Russia named the best Russian handballers of the 20th century. The voting results were:

Best Player (Men):	Andrey Lavrov
Best Player (Women):	Natalya Anisimova
Best Coach:	Vladimir Maksimov
Best Referee:	Yuri Taranukhin

== Achievements ==
USSR men's national team

Olympic Games

- Gold medal – Montreal 1976
- Gold medal – Seoul 1998
- Gold medal – Barcelona 1992 (Unified Team)
- Silver medal – Moscow 1980

World Championships

- Gold medal – Germany 1982
- Silver medal – Denmark 1978
- Silver medal – Czechoslovakia 1990

Russian men's national team

Olympic Games

- Gold medal – Sydney 2000
- Bronze medal – Athens 2004

World Championships

- Gold medal – Sweden 1993
- Gold medal – Japan 1997
- Silver medal – Egypt 1999

European Championships

- Gold medal – Spain 1996
- Silver medal – Portugal 1994
- Silver medal – Croatia 2000

USSR women's national team:

Olympic Games

- Gold medal – Montreal 1976
- Gold medal – Moscow 1980
- Bronze medal – Seoul 1988
- Bronze medal – Barcelona 1992 (Unified Team)

World Championships

- Gold medal – Hungary 1982
- Gold medal – Netherlands 1986
- Gold medal – South Korea 1990
- Silver medal – USSR 1975
- Silver medal – Czechoslovakia 1978
- Bronze medal – Yugoslavia 1973

Russian women's national team:

Olympic Games

- Gold medal – Rio de Janeiro 2016
- Silver medal – Beijing 2008
- Silver medal – Tokyo 2020

World Championships

- Gold medal – Italy 2001
- Gold medal – Russia 2005
- Gold medal – France 2007
- Gold medal – China 2009
- Bronze medal – Japan 2019

European Championships

- Silver medal – Sweden 2006
- Silver medal – France 2018
- Bronze medal – Romania 2000
- Bronze medal – Macedonia 2008
