= Daniel Garcia-Castellanos =

Spanish scientist (born 1968)

- Born: 1968 (age 57–58); Kuwait City
- Education: University of Barcelona
- Scientific career
- Fields: Geodynamics; Geomorphology
- Institutions: Institute of Earth Sciences Jaume Almera; Free University of Amsterdam
- Thesis: (1999)

Daniel Garcia-Castellanos (born 1968 in Kuwait) is a Spanish scientist at the Spanish National Research Council (CSIC) who investigates in the field of geophysics and is known for his theory about the catastrophic flooding of the Mediterranean Sea in the recent geological past, an event known as the Zanclean flood. Other scientific contributions deal with the evolution of the Earth's relief as a result of the deep geodynamic phenomena of the Earth’s interior interacting with the erosion and climate at the surface.

Some of his studies support the idea that, after being isolated from the world's oceans due to the collision between the tectonic plates of Africa and Eurasia, the Mediterranean Sea underwent a desiccation period known as the Messinian salinity crisis, and later a catastrophic reflooding through the Strait of Gibraltar, 5 million years ago, the Zanclean flood.

In 1998, he received the Garcia-Siñeriz Prize for his PhD thesis on forming sedimentary basins. He is currently teaching and leading Europe-funded research projects on Earth's relief and flooding processes at the Institute of Earth Sciences Jaume Almera, in Barcelona.
