= Shubarkuduk =

- Village
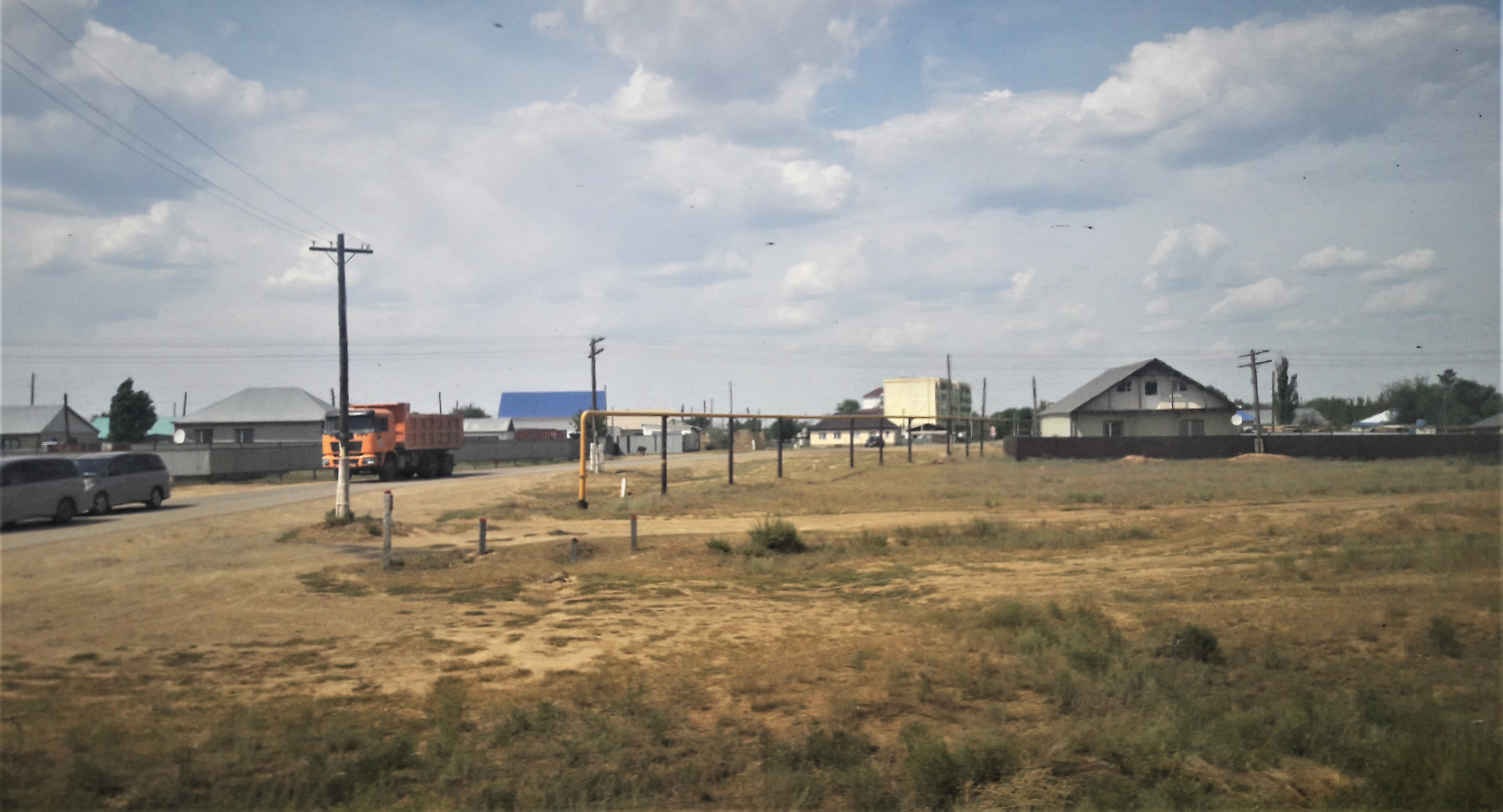

- Location within Kazakhstan
- Coordinates: 49°14′N 56°48′E
- Country: Kazakhstan
- Region: Aktobe
- District: Temir
- Population: 14,331

Shubarkuduk (Kazakh: Шұбарқұдық) is a village in the administrative center of the Temir District of the Aktobe Region of Kazakhstan.

There is a railway station on the Atyrau — Orsk line of the Ural-Caspian railway route, 179 km (111 mi) southwest of the regional centre of Aktobe.

The village is around 30 miles (50km) NNW from the antipode of the oceanic pole of inaccessibility, colloquially known as Point Nemo.

== Population ==
In 1999, the population of the village was 10,722 people (5,267 men and 5,455 women). According to the 2009 census, 11,199 people (5,497 men and 5,702 women) lived in the village.

On October 1, 2022, the population of the village was 14,331 people (7,188 men and 7,143 women).
