= Geosciences Barcelona (GEO3BCN) =

Spanish research institute

Geosciences Barcelona (acronym: GEO3BCN), formerly known as Institute of Earth Sciences Jaume Almera (or in Spanish Instituto de Ciencias de la Tierra Jaume Almera, ICTJA) is an earth science public research institute of the Consejo Superior de Investigaciones Científicas (CSIC). It was created in Barcelona (Spain) in 1965 (41.3847°N 2.1191°E) and it is considered among the top research institutes in Earth Sciences in Spain.

It is also known in Catalan as Institut de Ciències de la Terra Jaume Almera and was created as the Instituto de Geología de Barcelona. Its former name (before 2020) referred to the Spanish geologist Jaume Almera.

GEO3BCN hosts about 30 staff scientists, mounting to 70 when including contracted researchers, and to about 100 including the administration personnel (figures of 2012). Funding comes from the Spanish government, the European Union, and through project contracts with public and private companies.

Research is centered primarily on:

- Geodynamics and dynamics of the lithosphere
- Tectonophysics
- Seismology
- landscape evolution over geological time-scales.
- Geology and Geophysics
- Volcanism and volcanic risk
- Hydrology, transport, and erosion
- Earthquakes and seismic engineering
- Erosion and surface transport
- Limnology and climate change
- Paleoenvironement and geochemistry
- Optical properties of solids

Beyond research, the institute serves also as a main source of counsel in emergencies related to natural risks, and for R+D programmes such as geological CO_{2} storage

The institute hosts one of the largest public libraries for geoscience in Spain, and runs the main geoscientific journal in the country: Geologica Acta. A paleomagnetism lab, an isotopic geochemistry facility, and an X-ray diffractometer are among other public services hosted.
