= Henry Cookson =

British polar explorer and adventurer (born 1975)

Henry Cookson FRGS
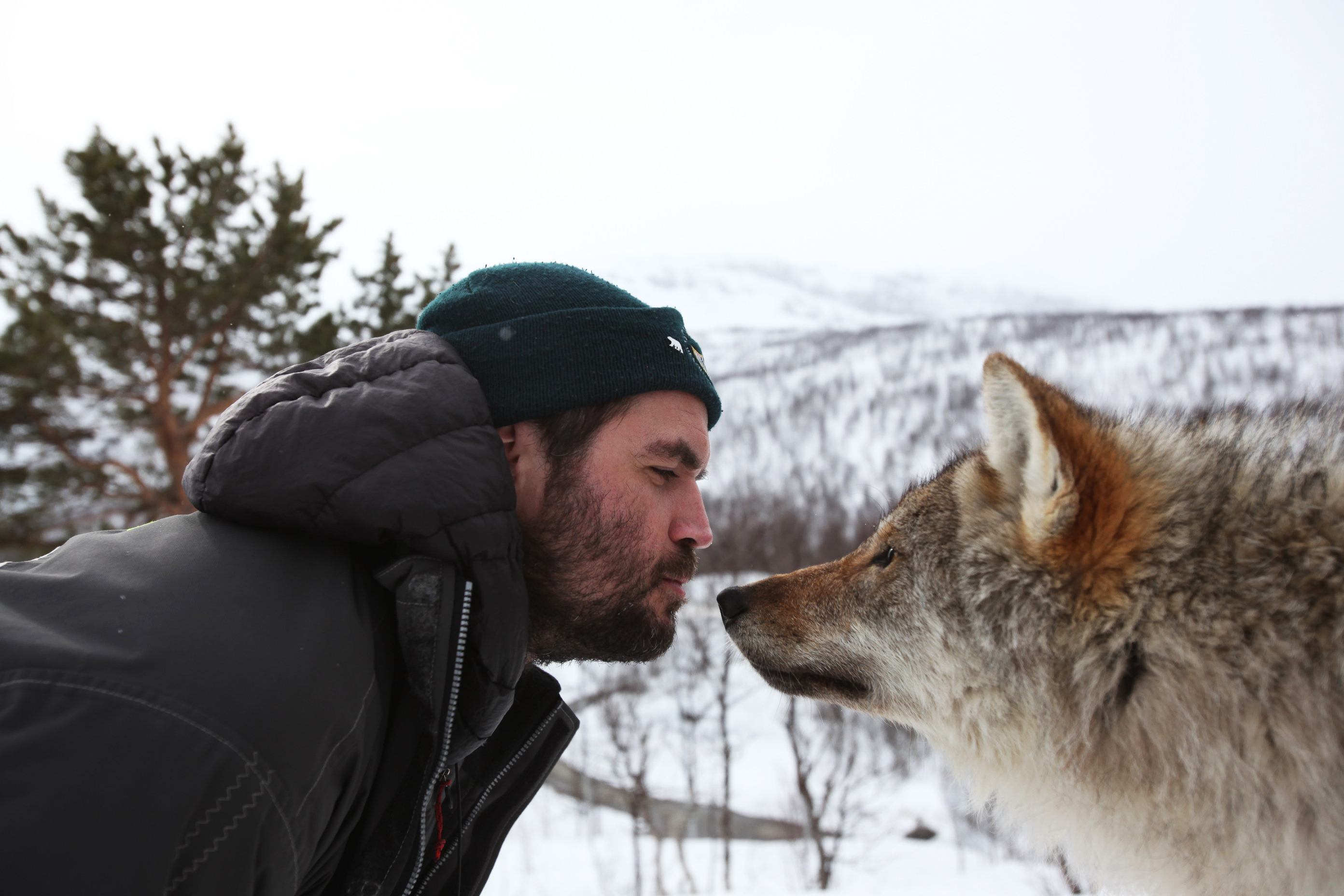
- Henry Cookson kissing a wolf in Norway
- Born: 16 September 1975 (age 50); Wimbledon, England
- Occupation: Explorer – expedition organiser
- Years active: 2005–present
- Known for: Holder of the World Record for reaching the exact centre of the Antarctic without mechanical means in 2006
- Website: http://www.henrycookson.com

Henry John Richard Cookson, FRGS (born 16 September 1975) is a British polar explorer and adventurer. On 19 January 2007 he, alongside fellow Britons Rory Sweet and Rupert Longsdon, and their Canadian polar guide Paul Landry, became the first team to reach the southern pole of Inaccessibility (POI) by foot, the last visitors being a research team using tracked vehicles & planes in 1965.

== Early life ==
Henry John Richard Cookson was born in Wimbledon and attended the Ecole de Roche, Harrow School, and the University of Newcastle upon Tyne. He briefly worked at investment bank Goldman Sachs.

== Career ==
=== Scott Dunn Polar Challenge ===
In 2005 he was persuaded to enter the Scott Dunn Polar Challenge as the third member of Team Hardware, alongside Rory Sweet and Rupert Longsdon. Despite all being novice polar explorers, they defied the odds and won the gruelling 360 mile race to the magnetic North Pole, breaking the course record in the process and finishing four hours ahead of the nearest competitors, a team of a Royal Marine and two Army Commandos.

=== Team N2i ===
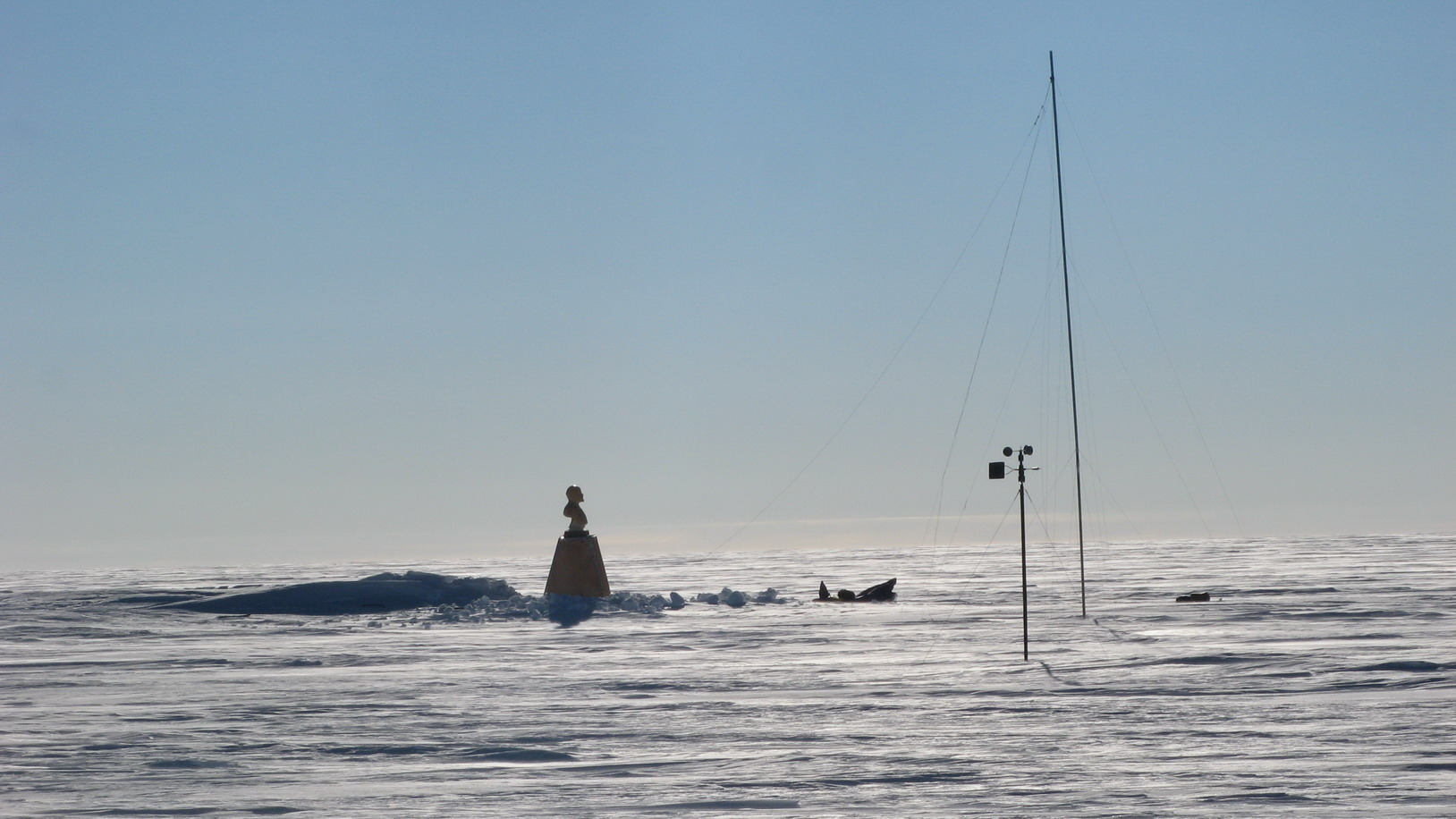
The Pole of Inaccessibility station in January 2007

Following the success of the Scott Dunn Polar Challenge, the trio decided to turn their sights on an expedition to the Antarctic Pole of Inaccessibility. Training began in 2006, and Canadian Paul Landry joined the effort. On 19 January 2007, 48 days after setting off from Novolazarevskaya Station, the four reached their goal, after kite skiing 1,100 miles to their destination. Upon arrival, they discovered the most visible remains left behind from the previous Soviet expedition in 1958, and the only indication that they had reached the POI - a bust of Lenin, which had been fixed to the chimney of a Russian built hut. The Guinness Book of Records lists them as the first people to reach the Pole of Inaccessibility without using motored craft.

=== Walking With The Wounded ===
It was announced in 2010 that Henry had been approached by Simon Daglish and Edward Parker to sign on as an expedition guide for Walking With The Wounded, a charitable expedition to the North Pole aimed at raising funds for injured servicemen and women. The expedition patron was Prince Harry, who stated his intention to join the expedition for its final days should his military commitments allow.
