= The Great Russian Race =

The Great Russian Race was a relay run starting in Vladivostok on 28 May 2005 and ending in St. Petersburg on 8 September 2005. As well as the running challenge, the event aimed to pioneer and develop the culture of charitable giving and sponsorship in an area of the world where the concept is relatively new. A number of international and Russian charities were selected by the World Race Trust trustees to administer a proportion of the funds raised, all of which were allocated to areas adjacent to the route of the Race.

About 250 British and 120 Russian runners participated. The route was about 11,000 kilometres (6,800 mi).
