= Global Warrior Project =

Polar exploration organization

- Founded: 2001
- Founder: Jim McNeill
- Website: https://www.global-warrior.com/

The Global Warrior Project (formerly Ice Warrior Project) is an organisation founded in 2001 by the explorer Jim McNeill. Its remit is to develop people from all walks of life and echelons of society into modern-day explorers; to discover change in the world’s most remote and extreme regions under the guidance of partner leading scientific authorities; and deliver these discoveries in an engaging, human manner to audiences around the globe.

The organisation provides raw, scientific data for others to go on and interpret in order to monitor these regions, which were described by Nobel peace prize nominee Sheila Watt-Cloutier as "clearly one of the most important regions when it comes to climate change."

The project's founder Jim McNeill maintains that without such knowledge humans cannot be true guardians of the planet and we cannot establish whether the actions we are taking to mitigate climate change are having any lasting impact.

As an organisation it has an altruistic project side which relies on corporate sponsorship and involves charitable work and also an underpinning commercial side.

Global Warrior Project is made up of 5 extreme environments - Ice, Ocean, Desert, Mountain and Jungle.

== See also ==
- Jim McNeill - the founder of the Global Warrior Project
