= Vladimir Maksimov (handballer) =

Soviet handball player (born 1945)

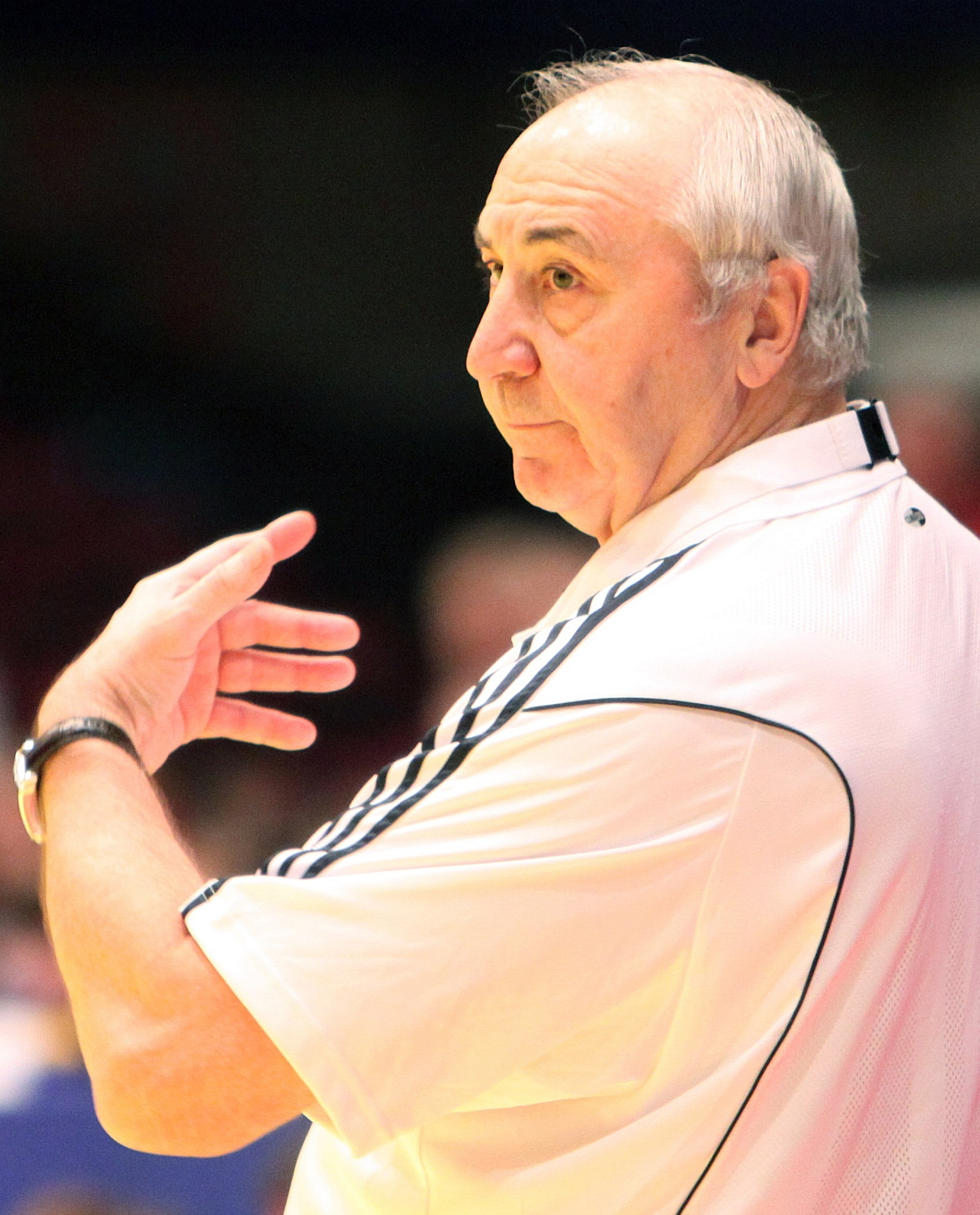
- Maksimov in 2010

Personal information
- Full name: Vladimir Salmanovich Maksimov
- Nationality: Russian
- Born: 14 October 1945 (age 81) Kant, Kirghiz Soviet Socialist Republic

Sport
- Sport: Handball
- Position: Centre back
- Current club: Retired

Senior clubs
- Years: Team
- –: Krasnodar University
- –: MAI Moscow
National team
Years	Team	Apps	(Gls)
–	Soviet Union	172	(690)

Teams managed
- 1992–2004: Russia men
- 2005–2008: Russia men
- 2010–2012: Russia men
- –: Chekhovskiye Medvedi
Medal record
Men's Handball
Gold medal – first place	1976 Montreal	Team
Gold medal – first place	2000 Sydnes	Coach
Bronze medal – third place	2004 Athens	Coach
World Championship
Silver medal – second place	1978 Denmark	Team
Gold medal – first place	1993 Sweden	Coach
Gold medal – first place	1997 Japan	Coach
Silver medal – second place	1999 Egypt	Coach
European Championship
Gold medal – first place	1996 Spain	Coach
Silver medal – second place	1994 Portugal	Coach
Silver medal – second place	2000 Croatia	Coach

Vladimir Salmanovich Maksimov (Russian: Владимир Салманович Максимов; born October 14, 1945, in Kant, Kirghiz SSR) is a Soviet and Russian handball player and coach. After his retirement as a player, he was a coach for the Russian national team, with which he won all three major titles in handball (European champion in 1996, world champion twice in 1993 and 1997 and Olympic champion in 2000).

As an active player, he was on the team who competed in the 1972 Summer Olympics (three matches played, fifth place) and in the 1976 Summer Olympics (gold medal). He played 172 goals for the Soviet Union men's national handball team, scoring 690 goals and was the captain of the team. His last game for the national team was 1978 World Men's Handball Championship final against West Germany, where the Soviet Union lost 19-20. At club level he played for Krasnodar University and MAI Moscow. He won Soviet Men's Handball Championship in 1972, 1974 and 1975 and the European Cup in 1973.

He has been the coach of the Russian national team on three occasions. He was fired in 2012 after Russia had failed to qualify for the 2011 World Championship and was knocked out in the preliminary round of the 2012 European Championship. He has also coached Chekhovskiye Medvedi, where he won the EHF Cup Winners' Cup in 2006 and the Russian Handball Super League 11 times in a row from 2002 to 2013

== Awards and titles ==
- Honoured Master of Sports of the USSR (1973)
- Honoured Coach of the USSR (1989)
- Honoured Coach of the RSFSR (1991)
- Order "For Merit to the Fatherland", 3rd class (April 19, 2001) – for his great contribution to the development of physical culture and sports, high sports achievements at the Games of the XXVII Olympiad in Sydney in 2000 '
- Order "For Merit to the Fatherland", 4th class (September 11, 1998) – for services to the state, many years of hard work and great contribution to strengthening friendship and cooperation between nations
- Order of the Red Banner of Labour (1976)
