= Vallot =

Vallot may refer to:

== People ==
- Vallot Vainula (born 1978), Estonian table tennis player
- Antoine Vallot, French doctor
- Gabrielle Vallot (1856–1933), French climber
- Jean Nicolas Vallot (1771–1860), French entomologist
- Joseph Vallot (1854–1925), French scientist
- Marc Vallot (1962–2001), Belgian judoka

== Other uses ==
- Vallot Glacier, glacier in Antarctica
- Vallot Hut, refuge in France
