= Gravier =

Gravier may refer to:

== Surname ==
- Bernard Gravier (1881–1923), French fencer
- Charles Gravier, comte de Vergennes (1717–1787), French statesman and diploma
- Charles Joseph Gravier (1865–1937), French zoologist
- Jacques Gravier (1651–1708), French Jesuit missionary in the New World
- Jean-François Gravier, French geographer famous for his 1947 work Paris and the French Desert
- Mike Gravier (born 1960), American football coach and former player
- Robert Gravier (1905–2005), French politician

== Places ==
- Gravier, New Orleans, neighborhood of the city of New Orleans, Louisiana, U.S.
- Gravier Peaks, prominent, ice-covered peaks, on the west coast of Graham Land, Antarctica

== See also ==
- Gravier v City of Liège (1985) Case 293/83, a landmark freedom of movement case in European law
- Graver (disambiguation)
- Graviera
- Gravir
- Ravier (disambiguation)
