= DD-Carboxypeptidase =

DD-Carboxypeptidase may refer to:

- Muramoylpentapeptide carboxypeptidase, an enzyme
- Zinc D-Ala-D-Ala carboxypeptidase, an enzyme
- DD-Transpeptidase, an enzyme
