= Vanni =

Vanni may refer to:

== People ==
=== Given name ===
- Vanni Corbellini (born 1955), Italian actor and director
- Vanni Marcoux (1877–1962), French opera singer
- Vanni Rodeghiero (born 1942), Italian javelin thrower
- Vanni Treves (1940–2019), Italian-British business executive

=== Surname ===
- Andrea Vanni (1332–1414), Italian painter
- Edo Vanni (1918-2007), American baseball player, coach and manager
- Francesco Vanni (1563–1610), Italian painter
- Giorgio Vanni (born 1963), Italian singer-songwriter
- Giovanni Battista Vanni (1599–1660), Italian painter and engraver
- Lippo Vanni (fl. 1344–1372), Italian painter
- Luca Vanni (born 1985), Italian tennis player
- Massimo Vanni (born 1946), Italian film and television actor
- Raffaello Vanni (1590–1657), Italian painter
- Raniero Vanni d'Archirafi (born 1931), former Italian diplomat
- Renata Vanni (1909–2004), Italian-American film actress
- Sam Vanni (1908–1992), Finnish painter
- Simone Vanni (born 1979), Italian Olympic fencer
- Tim Vanni (born 1961), American Olympic wrestler
- Turino Vanni (fl. 14th century), Italian painter
- Vanna Vanni (1920–1998), Italian film actress
- Ville Vänni (born 1979), Finnish musician

== Places ==
- Vanni (Sri Lanka), an area of northern Sri Lanka
  - Vanni Electoral District
- Vannimai or Vanni chieftaincies, feudal land divisions in northern Sri Lanka from the 12th century to 1803
- Vanni Peak, a mountain in Graham Land, Antarctica
- Vänni, village in Rõuge Parish, Võru County, Estonia

== Other uses ==
- Vani (custom) or vanni, a type of compensation marriage practice in Pakistan
- Vanni Fucci, a character in Inferno by Dante Alighieri
- Vanni (crab), freshwater crabs of family Gecarcinucidae
- V.A.N.N.I, a network that is used as a part of Five Nights At Freddy's: Security Breach's DLC, Ruin.

== See also ==
- Vani (disambiguation)
- Vany (disambiguation)
- Vanniyar, a caste of southern India
