= Charles Gravier =

Charles Gravier may refer to:

- Charles Gravier, comte de Vergennes (1717–1787), French statesman and diplomat
- Charles Joseph Gravier (1865–1937), French zoologist
