= Louis Rendu =

French Roman Catholic bishop of Annecy and a scientist

Most Reverend Louis Rendu
- Bishop
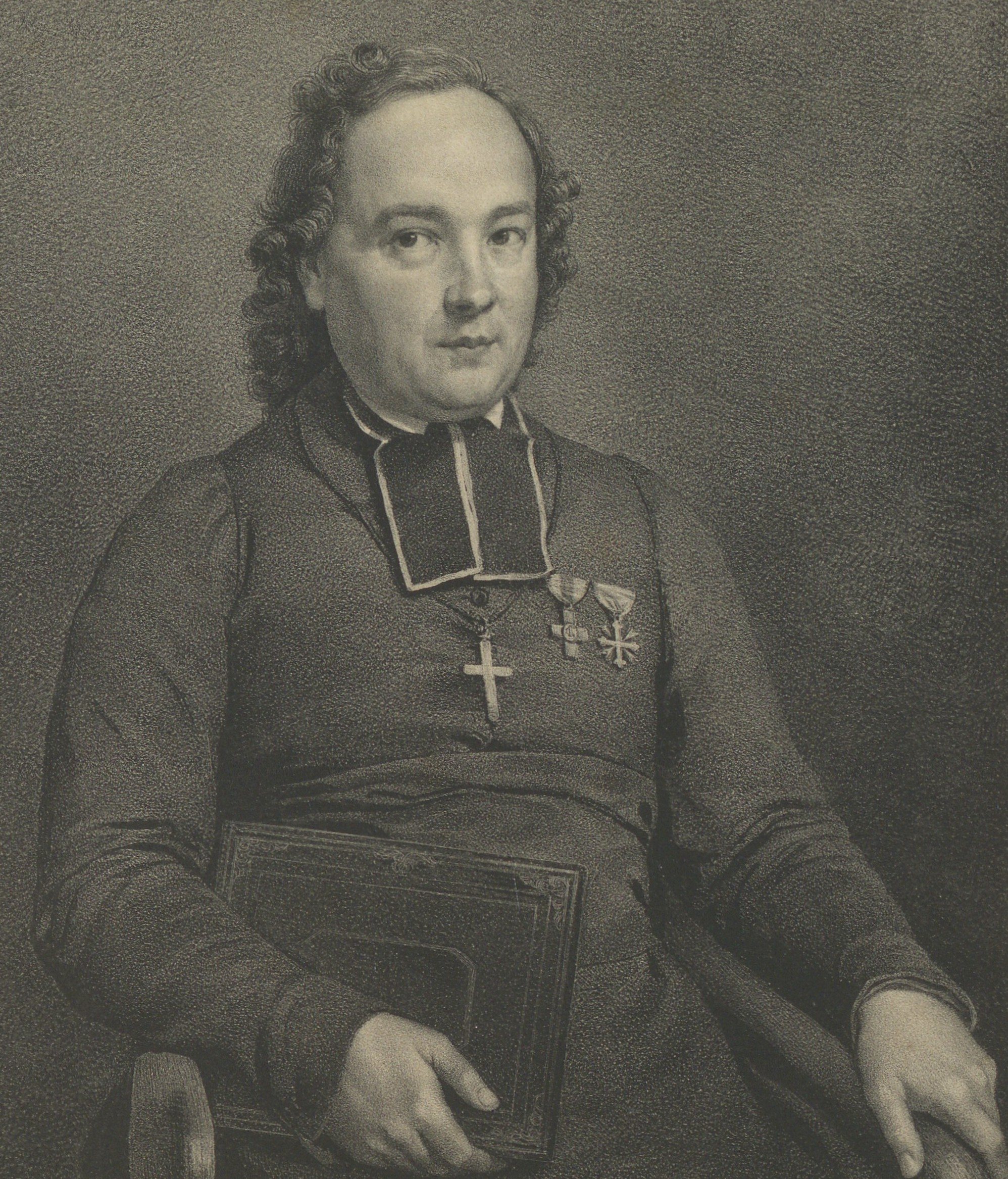
- Church: Catholic Church
- Diocese: Roman Catholic Diocese of Annecy
- In office: 1842-1859
- Predecessor: Pierre-Joseph Rey
- Successor: Charles-Marie Magnin

Orders
- Ordination: 19 June 1814
- Consecration: 29 April 1843 by Alexis Billiet

Personal details
- Born: 9 December 1789 Meyrin, Geneva
- Died: 21 August 1859 (aged 69) Annecy, Savoy

Louis Rendu (9 December 1789 in Meyrin – 20 August 1859) was a French Roman Catholic bishop of Annecy and a scientist.

== Life ==
Louis Rendu was born at Meyrin, a small town a mile northwest of Geneva, on 9 December 1789.

He received his priestly education at the Grand Séminaire de Chambéry. He was ordained a priest on 19 June 1814, and appointed a teacher of belles lettres at the Collège royale de Chambéry. From 1821 to 1829, he was a professor of Physics.

He was a founding member of the Académie des sciences, belles-lettres et arts de Savoie in 1819, along with Alexis Billiet, future archbishop of Chambéry, and the society's permanent secretary.

His first book, Traité de Physique, was published at Chambéry in 1825. In 1828, he published Théorie électrique de cristallisation, which was awarded a prize by the Institut de France. In 1829, the Collège de Chambéry was handed over to the Jesuits, and Rendu was named a canon of the cathedral Chapter of Chambéry.

He was nominated bishop of Annecy by King Charles Albert of Sardinia on 25 August 1842, and approved by Pope Gregory XVI on 27 January 1843. He was consecrated a bishop in the cathedral of Annecy on 29 April 1843, by Archbishop Alexis Billiet of Chambéry. As bishop, he chose to send his best priestly students to the University of Turin, to take degrees in Canon Law, under Giovanni Nepomuceno Nuytz, until Nuytz's views were condemned by Pope Pius IX in his apostolic brief of 22 August 1851.

In a diocese which contained around 300 parishes, he built and consecrated 102 new churches.

Bishop Rendu was a Chevalier de l'Ordre du Mérite civil de Savoie, and a Commandeur de l'Ordre des SS. Maurice et Lazare.

Bishop Rendu died on 20 August 1859. His almoner, François Marie Guillermin, who was present at the death-bed, says it was 21 August.

== Works ==
Rendu was the author of Theorie des glaciers de la Savoie, an important book on the mechanisms of glacial motion. The Rendu Glacier, Alaska, U.S. and Mount Rendu, Antarctica are named for him.

His ethnological and religious-themed works include:

- De l'influence des Moeurs sur les Lois, et de l'influence des Lois sur les Moeurs, 1833
- Moeurs et coutumes de la Savoie du Nord au XIXe siècle, 1845
- Lettre à S. M. le Roi de Prusse (sur la situation religieuse de l'Europe), 1848
- Des efforts du protestantisme, (in French) Paris: Louis Vives 1855.
- "Mandements et instructions pastorales." (in French). Collected in: Jacques-Paul Migne, Collection intégrale et universelle des orateurs sacrés du premier et du second ordre. Volume 85. Paris: A l'imprimerie Catholique du Petit-Montrouce, 1856. Pp. 103-395.

== See also ==
- List of Roman Catholic scientist-clerics

== Sources ==
- Baud, Henri; Binz, Louis (1985). Le Diocèse de Genève-Annecy. (in French). Annecy: Editions Beauchesne, 1985. Pp. 209-211.
- Guillermin, F.-M. (1867). Vie de Mgr Louis Rendu, évêque d'Annecy. (in French). Paris: C. Douniol, 1867. {reprint: Hachette 2016] [eulogistic, pietistic]
- Mermillod, Gaspard (1859). Mgr. Louis Rendu, évêque d'Annecy: esquisse biographique, (in French), Carouge: A. Jaquemot 1859.
- Ritzler, Remigius; Sefrin, Pirminus (1968). Hierarchia Catholica medii et recentioris aevi ... A pontificatu Pii PP. VII (1800) usque ad pontificatum Gregorii PP. XVI (1846) (in Latin). Vol. VII. Monasterii: Libr. Regensburgiana.

=== External links ===
- David M. Cheney, Catholic-Hierarchy.org., "Bishop Louis Rendu"
- Australian Antarctic Data Centre: Maps, charts, and geographic information, Mount Rendu. Retrieved: 30 July 2024.
