= Arrowsmith Peninsula =

Cape in Graham Land, Antarctica

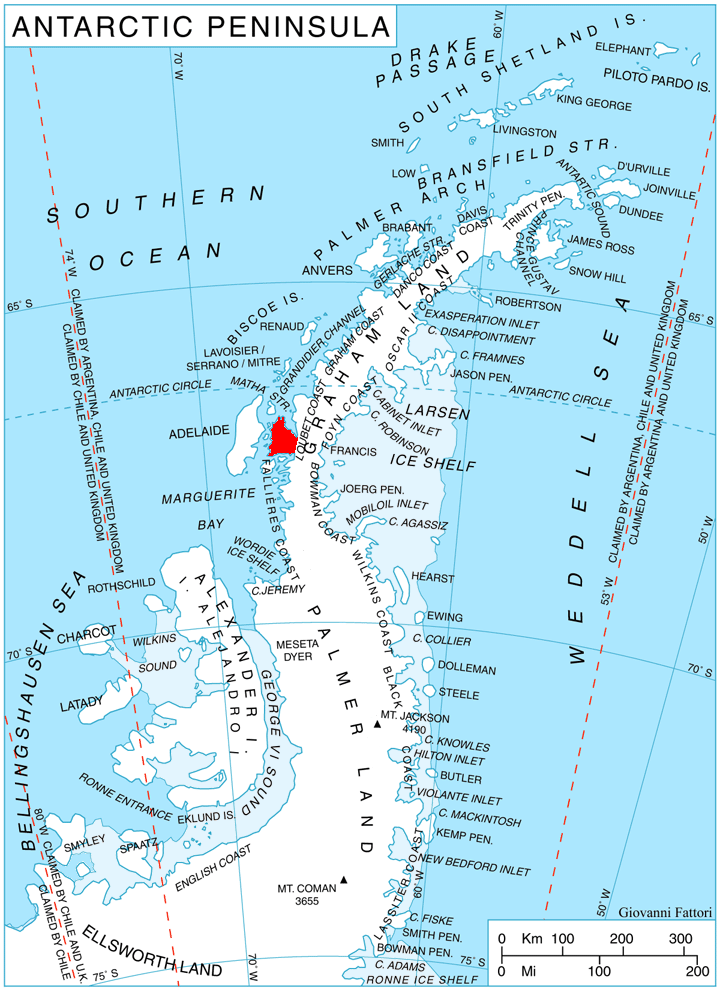
Location of Arrowsmith Peninsula on Graham Coast, Antarctic Peninsula.

Arrowsmith Peninsula (67°15′S 67°15′W) is a cape about 40 miles (64 km) long on the west coast of Graham Land, west of Forel Glacier, Sharp Glacier and Lallemand Fjord, and northwest of Bourgeois Fjord, with Hanusse Bay lying to the northwest. It was surveyed by the Falkland Islands Dependencies Survey (FIDS) in 1955-58 and named for Edwin Porter Arrowsmith, Governor of the Falkland Islands.

== Named features ==
Various features along the coast of Arrowsmith Peninsula have been charted and named. The peninsula and many of its features were first seen and roughly surveyed in 1909 by the French Antarctic Expedition (FAE) under Jean-Baptiste Charcot. Unless otherwise noted, all of the following features were named by the United Kingdom Antarctic Place-Names Committee (UK-APC).

=== Northern portion ===
Shmidt Point marks the north extremity of Arrowsmith Peninsula. It was sketched from the air in 1937 by the British Graham Land Expedition (BGLE) under John Riddoch Rymill and named in 1954 for Otto Schmidt, director of the Arctic Institute at Leningrad and leader of many Arctic expeditions.

Langmuir Cove indents the north end of the peninsula, just to the west of Shmidt Point. It was named for Irving Langmuir, an American physicist who studied the formation of snow. The northwest extremity of the peninsula is Thorne Point, which is west of the cove. It was mapped in 1960 from surveys made by FIDS personnel, and was named for John Thorne, FIDS meteorologist at Detaille Island. To the west of that is Shumskiy Cove. Photographed from the air by the Falkland Islands and Dependencies Aerial Survey Expedition (FIDASE) in 1957, it was mapped by FIDS from 1956 to 1959, and later named for Petr A. Shumskiy, Russian glaciologist.

=== West coast ===
Along the west coast, the headland Bagnold Point divides Shumskiy Cove from Gunnel Channel. It was named in 1960 for Ralph A. Bagnold, English explorer and geologist. Inland to the east lies Mount St. Louis, and farther inland, Meier Valley, named for Mark F. Meier, an American geologist who studied strain in glaciers.

Continuing south along the west coast, the next notable feature is Longridge Head, which forms the north side of Whistling Bay and marks the south end of a small coastal ridge which extends 3 nautical miles (6 km) northward along the peninsula. The descriptive name was applied by FIDS personnel who surveyed the headland in 1948. Whistling Bay is an open bay, 4 nautical miles (7 km) wide and indenting 2.5 nautical miles (4.6 km) between Longridge Head and Cape Saenz. It was first roughly surveyed in 1936 by BGLE personnel, then resurveyed in 1948 by FIDS, who named it for an unidentified whistling sound heard there at the time of the survey.

=== South coast ===
The southernmost extremity of the peninsula is Cape Saenz, which was named by Charcot for Roque Sáenz Peña, President of the Argentine Republic. The cape is between Laubeuf Fjord and Bigourdan Fjord. Inland of the cape, the Mercanton Heights stand between Bigourdan Fjord and Nye Glacier. The Heights were mapped by FIDS from 1948 to 1959, and were later named for Swiss glaciologist Paul-Louis Mercanton.

Farther east, just before Arrowsmith Peninsula joins the main coast, rocky Chertigrad Point marks the west side of the entrance to Blind Bay, the northeast extremity and head of Bourgeois Fjord. The point was named by the Bulgarian Antarctic Institute (BAI) after the western Bulgarian medieval fortress Chertigrad. Blind Bay was first surveyed in 1936 by the BGLE, and named by FIDS, following a 1949 survey, because the bay proved a blind alley to sledging parties.

=== Peaks and nunataks ===
- Bentley Crag
- Dorsey Mountains
  - Mount Lagally
  - Vanni Peak
- Gravier Peaks
- Haslam Heights
  - Mount Veynberg
  - Moyes Nunatak
  - Tanglefoot Peak
- Lewis Peaks
- Mount Rendu
- Mount St. Louis
- Organ Peak
- Seue Peaks
- Somers Nunatak
- Tyndall Mountains
  - Pryor Peak
  - Richardson Peak
- Vanni Peak

=== Glaciers ===
- Antevs Glacier
- Avsyuk Glacier
- Brückner Glacier
- Heim Glacier
- Nye Glacier
- Reid Glacier
- Saussure Glacier
- Somigliana Glacier
- Vallot Glacier

== See also ==
- Hinks Channel
