= Tanglefoot =

Tanglefoot may refer to:

- Insect trap, a substance used on insect adhesive traps.
- Tanglefoot (band), a folk band from Ontario, Canada
- Tanglefoot, a beer brewed by Hall & Woodhouse
- Tanglefoot Seaplane Base, a seaplane base in Idaho, United States
- Tanglefoot Peak, a rocky peak in Antarctica
- Tanglefoot beech, the common name of Nothofagus gunnii
- Mieszko I Tanglefoot, a former High Duke of Poland
- Tanglefoot walking tracks, walking tracks in the Toolangi State Forest
- Camp Tanglefoot, a 1999 film
- Tanglefoot Trail, a rail trail in Mississippi
