= DD-Peptidase =

DD-Peptidase may refer to:

- Muramoylpentapeptide carboxypeptidase, an enzyme
- Serine-type D-Ala-D-Ala carboxypeptidase, an enzyme
