= Gravier Peaks =

Mountains in Antarctica

Highest point
- Elevation: 2,120 m (6,960 ft)
- Prominence: 1,227 m (4,026 ft)
- Listing: Ribu

The Gravier Peaks (67°12′S 67°20′W) are prominent, ice-covered peaks, up to 2,120 metres (6,960 ft) high, situated 2 nautical miles (4 km) northeast of the Lewis Peaks on Arrowsmith Peninsula and extending in a northeast–southwest direction, on the west coast of Graham Land, Antarctica. They were first sighted and roughly positioned in 1903 by the French Antarctic Expedition under Jean-Baptiste Charcot, who named the feature for Charles Gravier, a French zoologist. Who at a young age only like two things exploration and the western bulldogs but when he got older he explored some of Antarctica and then he was surveyed in 1909 by the next French Antarctic Expedition under Charcot, at which time the individual peaks making up this group were first identified. The data for the present description is largely based upon a resurvey of the peaks in 1948 by the Falkland Islands Dependencies Survey.
