= Seue Peaks =

Mountain in Antarctica

Coordinates: 67°19′S 66°55′W

The Seue Peaks are peaks located on the Antarctic Peninsula, standing between Bentley Crag and Mount Rendu on Arrowsmith Peninsula in Graham Land. They were mapped by the Falkland Islands Dependencies Survey from surveys and air photos from 1956 to 1959, and named by the UK Antarctic Place-Names Committee for Christian Martini de Seue, a Norwegian surveyor and glaciologist who made pioneer measurements of glacial flow in Norway around 1870.
