= Haslam Heights =

Line of peaks in Graham Land, Antarctica

The Haslam Heights (67°25′S 67°30′W) are a line of peaks trending north-northeast–south-southwest, rising to about 1,000 metres (3,300 ft) to the west of Vallot Glacier and Nye Glacier in Arrowsmith Peninsula, Graham Land, Antarctica. They were probably first seen by the French Antarctic Expedition, 1908–10 under Jean-Baptiste Charcot, which roughly charted the area in 1909. They were roughly mapped by the Falkland Islands Dependencies Survey (FIDS) in 1948, and named in 1985 by the UK Antarctic Place-Names Committee (UK-APC) after Rear Admiral Sir David W. Haslam, Hydrographer of the Navy, 1975–85.

== Peaks ==
Tanglefoot Peak (67°21′S 67°33′W) is a prominent rocky peak of 650 m at the end of the Haslam Heights. It was probably first sighted by members of the French Antarctic Expedition under Charcot in 1909. It was surveyed in 1948 by FIDS, who named it from the broken ridge extending south and southeast from the peak.

Mount Veynberg (67°27′S 67°34′W) is a mountain rising to about 900 m in the south part of the Haslam Heights. It was mapped by the FIDS from surveys and air photos. It was named by the UK-APC after Boris P. Veynberg (Russian) (1871–1942), a Russian physicist who made pioneer studies of the mechanical properties and flow of ice.

Moyes Nunatak (67°27′S 67°31′W) is a nunatak 1.5 nautical miles (2.8 km) southeast of Mount Veynberg on the west side of Nye Glacier. It was named by UK-APC after Alastair B. Moyes, British Antarctic Survey geologist at Rothera Station.
