= Tyndall Mountains =

Mountain range in Graham Land, Antarctica

The Tyndall Mountains (67°15′S 67°10′W) are a group of mountains close south of Avsyuk Glacier in central Arrowsmith Peninsula, Graham Land. Photographed from the air by FIDASE, 1956–57. Mapped by Falkland Islands Dependencies Survey (FIDS) from surveys and air photos, 1948–59. Named by United Kingdom Antarctic Place-Names Committee (UK-APC) for John Tyndall (1820–93), Irish mountaineer and pioneer glaciologist, author of many works on glaciers and the physical properties of ice.

== Peaks ==
Pryor Peak sits on the west side of the range, on the edge of Giants Cirque, a large cirque which opens to the southwest to Vallot Glacier. The cirque was named by the UK Antarctic Place-Names Committee in 1983 following British Antarctic Survey geological work in the area. The peak was named by UK-APC after Commander John S. N. Pryor, Royal Navy.

Richardson Peak, rising to about 600 m, sits on the east side of Vallot Glacier. It was named by UK-APC after Hilda Richardson, Secretary General, International Glaciological Society.

Both peaks were photographed from the air by the Falkland Islands and Dependencies Aerial Survey Expedition (FIDASE) in 1957 and visited by British Antarctic Survey (BAS) geologists, 1980–81.
