= List of Légion d'honneur recipients by name (V) =

The French government gives out the Legion of Honour awards, to both French and foreign nationals, based on a recipient's exemplary services rendered to France, or to the causes supported by France. This award is divided into five distinct categories (in ascending order), i.e. three ranks: Knight, Officer, Commander, and two titles: Grand Officer and Grand Cross. Knight is the most common and is awarded for either at least 20 years of public service or acts of military or civil bravery. The rest of the categories have a quota for the number of years of service in the category below before they can be awarded. The Officer rank requires a minimum of eight years as a Knight, and the Commander, the highest civilian category for a non-French citizen, requires a minimum of five years as an Officer. The Grand Officer and the Grand Cross are awarded only to French citizens, and each requires three years' service in their respective immediately lower rank. The awards are traditionally published and promoted on 14 July.

The following is a non-exhaustive list of recipients of the Legion of Honour awards, since the first ceremony in May 1803. 2,550 individuals can be awarded the insignia every year. The total number of awards is close to 1 million (estimated at 900,000 in 2021, including over 3,000 Grand Cross recipients), with some 92,000 recipients alive today. Only until 2008 was gender parity achieved amongst the yearly list of recipients, with the total number of women recipients since the award's establishment being only 59 at the end of the second French empire and only 26,000 in 2021.

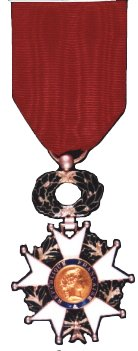

Recipient	Dates (birth – death)	General work & reason for the recognition	Award category (date)
Tony Vaccaro	1922 – 2022	U.S. war photographer. Known for his photos taken in Europe during 1944 and 1945, and in Germany immediately following World War II [Note: His award was given on the 50th anniversary of the D Day landing]	TBA (23 May 1994)
Rose Valland	1898 – 1980	France art historian, member of the French Resistance, captain in the French military, and one of the most decorated women in French history.	TBA
Alexander Vallaury	1850 – 1921	French-Ottoman architect. Known for founding architectural education and lectured in the School of Fine Arts in Constantinople, Ottoman Empire	Knight (1896)
Joseph Vallot	1854 – 1925	French scientist and mountaineer. Known for scientific research in the Mont Blanc massif and for constructing an observatory and a mountain refuge on Mont Blanc	TBA
Ninette de Valois	1898 – 2001	Irish-born United Kingdom dancer, teacher, choreographer, and director of classical ballet. Known for dancing professionally with Serge Diaghilev's Ballets Russes, and later established the Royal Ballet.	Knight (1 May 1950)
Albert van Dievoet	1886 – 1980	General Manager of the Compagnie Internationale des Wagons-Lits	Knight (TBA); Officer (TBA)
Édouard van Dievoet	1875 – 1961	doctor of law and political and administrative sciences, General Manager of the Compagnie Internationale des Wagons-Lits	Knight (TBA); Officer (TBA)
John T. van Rensalier		350 US Battalion Headquarters, World War I	TBA
Joost van Vollenhoven	1877 – 1918	Dutch-born French soldier and colonial administrator.	TBA
Hoyt Vandenberg	1899 – 1954	United States Air Force general	Knight (TBA); Officer (TBA); Commander (TBA); Grand Officer (TBA)
Cornelius Vanderbilt III	1873 – 1942	American military officer, inventor, engineer, and yachtsman	Knight (TBA); Officer (TBA); Commander (TBA)
Raphaël Varane	1993 – Present	French professional footballer (Spanish club Real Madrid / France national football team)	Knight (2018)
Tibor Varga	1921 – 2003	Violinist, conductor, pedagogue. Known for developing pedagogic methods for teaching string music.	TBA
George Vari	1923 – 2010	Canada real estate developer and philanthropist	TBA
John H. Vaughn		45th Division, 7th US Army, World War II Technician fourth grade	TBA
Jan G.F. Veldhuis	1938 – Present	Netherlands administrator/governor in the fields of science education and research, healthcare and culture (nationally and internationally)	Knight (1997)
Violette Verdy	1933 – 2016	French ballerina, choreographer, teacher, and writer. Known for working as a dance company director with the Paris Opera Ballet (France) and the Boston Ballet (United States).	Knight (presented: 2008)
Jules Verne	1828 – 1905	French novelist, poet, and playwright	Knight (9 April 1870); Officer (19 July 1892)
Ben Verwaayen	1952 – Present	Netherlands businessman and a general partner of Keen Venture Partners	Knight (TBA)
François de Vial	1904 – 1984	Diplomat and Plenipotentiary Minister of France	knight (TBA); Officer (TBA)
Philip Vian	1894 – 1968	Royal Navy officer who served in both World Wars.	
Jehan Georges Vibert	1840 – 1902	French academic painter	
Vincent-Marie Viénot, comte de Vaublanc	1756 – 1845	French royalist politician, writer and artist	
Louis Vierne	1870 – 1937	French organist and composer of Notre Dame de Paris	
Gilles Vigneault	1928 – Present	Québécois poet, publisher, singer-songwriter, and Quebec nationalist and sovereigntist.	
Jose Enrique Villa Rivera		Mexico General director of the National Polytechnic Institute	
Jean-Paul Villain		France Investment Director of Abu Dhabi Investment Authority	Knight (2007)
Víctor Manuel Villaseñor		Mexico General Director of the Constructora Nacional de Carros de Ferrocarril, now Bombardier Transportation México	TBA (1962)
Jacques-Pierre Orillard de Villemanzy	1751 – 1830	French military commissary general	
Alban de Villeneuve-Bargemon	1784 – 1850	Parliamentary leader of the French legitimists	
Jean-Félix-Albert-Marie Vilnet	1922 – 2013	Catholic Bishop and Council Father at Vatican II	
Nallam Vincatramaya			TBA (Nominated: 2007; Received: 2008)
Galina Vishnevskaya	1926 – 2012	Russian soprano opera singer and recitalist	

== See also ==
- Legion of Honour
- List of Legion of Honour recipients by name
- List of foreign recipients of Legion of Honour by name
- List of foreign recipients of the Legion of Honour by country
- List of British recipients of the Legion of Honour for the Crimean War
- Legion of Honour Museum
- Ribbons of the French military and civil awards
- War Cross (France)
