= Diocese of Annecy =

Catholic diocese in France

Coordinates: 45°53′37″N 6°07′41″E

Diocese of Annecy Dioecesis Anneciensis Diocèse d'Annecy

Catholic
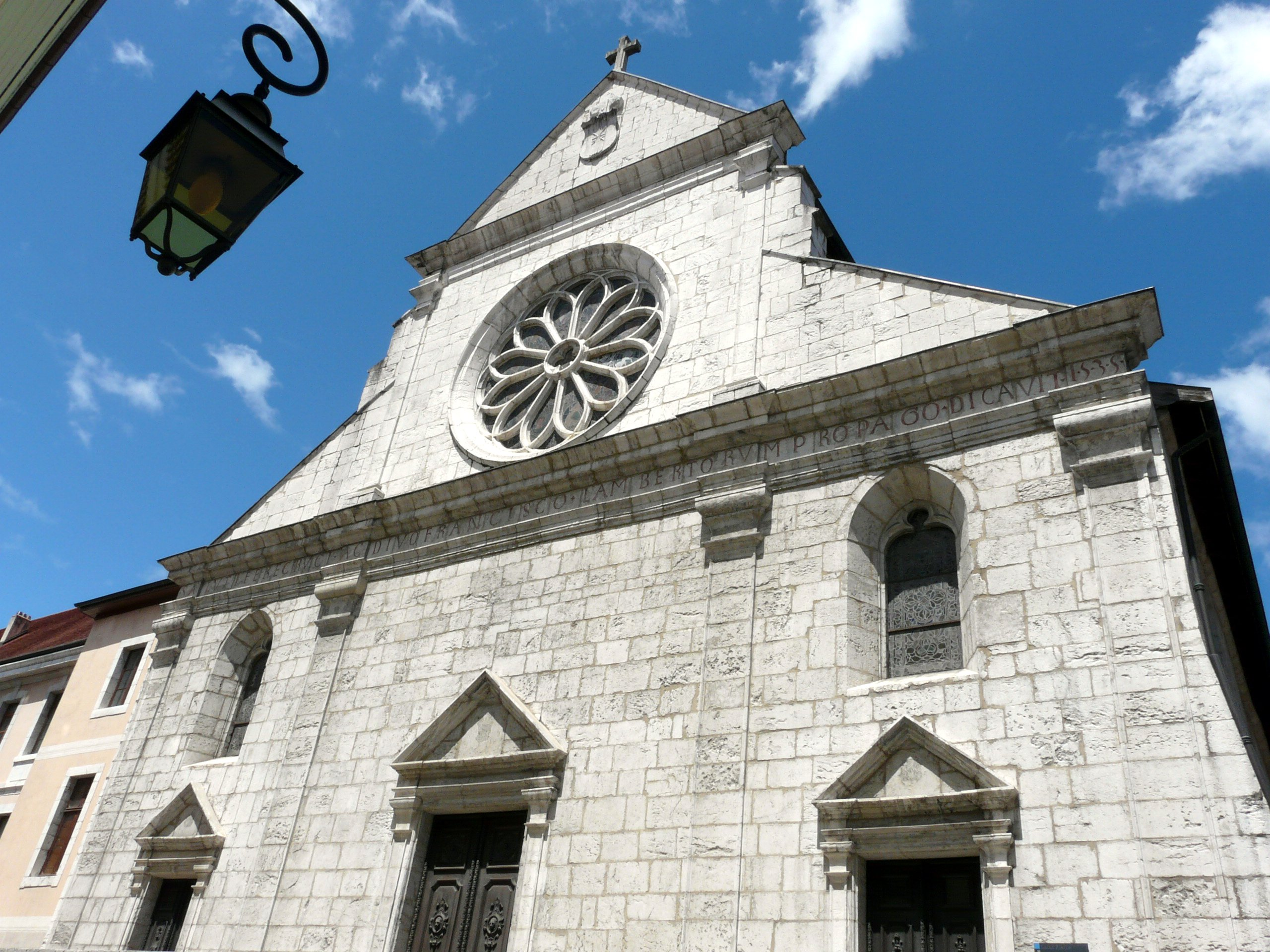
- Annecy Cathedral

Location
- Country: France
- Ecclesiastical province: Lyon
- Metropolitan: Archdiocese of Lyon

Statistics
- Area: 4,317 km^{2} (1,667 sq mi)
- Population: Total; Catholics: (as of 2022); 829,017 ▲; 528,000 (est.)
- Parishes: 38 'new parishes'

Information
- Denomination: Roman Catholic
- Sui iuris church: Latin Church
- Rite: Roman Rite
- Established: 15 February 1822
- Cathedral: Cathedral of St. Peter in Annecy
- Patron saint: St. Francis de Sales; St. Peter in Chains
- Secular priests: 80 (diocesan) ▼24 (Religious Orders) ▼26 Permanent Deacons ▲

Current leadership
- Pope: Leo XIV
- Bishop: Yves Le Saux
- Metropolitan Archbishop: Olivier de Germay
- Bishops emeritus: Yves Boivineau

Map

Website
- Website of the Diocese

The Diocese of Annecy (Latin: Dioecesis Anneciensis; French: Diocèse d'Annecy) is a Latin Church diocese of the Catholic Church in France, located 26 miles (42km) south of Geneva. Saint-Gingolph VS, a town in the Swiss canton of Valais, is also part of the diocese. Originally erected in 1822, after the Concordat as a suffragan (ecclesiastical subordinate) of the archdiocese of Chambéry, the diocese of Annecy is composed of the entirety of the department of Haute-Savoie in the Region of Rhône-Alpes.

On 8 December 2002, the archdiocese of Chambéry was demoted to the rank of simple diocese, and along with its suffragan dioceses was transferred to the metropolitan Archdiocese of Lyon.

The current bishop of Annecy is Yves Le Saux, appointed in 2022.

As of 2015 there was one priest for every 3,279 Catholics; as of 2022, there was one priest for every 5028 Catholics.

== History ==
From 1535 to 1801 the bishops of Geneva, exiled by the Reformation from Geneva, lived at Annecy. The canons of the cathedral Chapter of Geneva were also forced to migrate to Annecy, Francis de Sales was Bishop of Geneva, living in Annecy, from 1602 to 1622.

=== Seminary ===
Bishop Juste Guérin of Geneva (1639–1645) attempted to improve the quality of his clergy by instituting a seminar at Annecy for candidates for ordination lasting ten days. Bishop Jean d’Arenthon d’Alex (1661–1695) attempted to create a real seminary, construction of which began in 1681, and was completed in 1688; it was intended for persons who had already completed their basic training in philosophy and theology; its course was to last ten months. He also established quarterly retreats at the seminary, and made attendance a requirement for any priest to receive a license to hear confessions.

During his episcopate, Bishop de Thiollaz ordained 186 new priests; Rey ordained 258; Rendu ordained 675.

=== Thiollaz ===
Claude-François de Thiollaz had studied the humanities and theology in Annecy, at Saint-Sulpice in Paris, and at the Sorbonne, obtaining his licenciate from the Sorbonne. His doctorate in theology was granted on 26 May 1781. Bishop Jean-Pierre Biord of Geneva (1764−1785) named him to a vacant canonry in the Chapter of Geneva in 1778, and he was installed by proxy on 19 April 1779. Canon Thiollaz was appointed grand-vicar by Bishop Biord on 16 February 1780. Bishop Biord died on 17 February 1785, and the Chapter elected as vicar capitular during the sede vacante, which lasted over two years, all five of the bishop's vicars general, including Claude-François de Thiollaz. A successor to Bishop Biord, Canon Jpseph-Marie Paget, Provost of the cathedral Chapter, was nominated by Victor Amadeus III of Sardinia on 3 January 1787, and approved by Pope Pius VI on 23 April. On 13 June 1787, Canon de Thiollaz was installed as Provost of Geneva; he had been nominated by the new bishop, and was approved by Pope Pius VI, who held the right of appointment.

=== French occupation ===
In 1792, Savoy was invaded and occupied by forces of the French National Assembly. On 22 September 1792, French troops took Chambéry, and on 26 September Annecy. Bishop Paget of Geneva-Annecy was considered by the French administration to be a French bishop, because 107 of his parishes were in French territory. He was therefore ordered to swear the oath to the Civil Constitution of the Clergy or face deportation to French Guyana. Bishop Paget fled on 22 September 1792, naming Provost Thiollaz as his administrator. Commissioners were sent from Paris imposed a revolutionary government, and on 8 March 1793 issued an ecclesiastical decree which followed metropolitan French policy by reducing the number of dioceses from 5 to 1, to be centered in Annecy and called the diocese of Mont-Blanc. Four of the five bishops then in office went into exile, including Paget, the bishop of Geneva; the fifth was too aged. Paget fled to Swiss territory, then to Turin in Savoy, and finally took up residence in Pinerolo. When the French seized Savoy, in the Veneto, at Verona. Electors, who did not have to be Catholic or even Christian, were to meet and elect a bishop, who would be required to take the usual oaths to the French Constitution. Papal participation in any form was forbidden. These arrangements were uncanonical and schismatic.

On 26 October 1792, the "National Assembly of the Allobroges" ordered the confiscation of all ecclesiastical property, whether regular or secular. On 13 February 1793, the Provost of Geneva, Claude-François de Thiollaz, and all the canons of the cathedral Chapter, issued a manifesto, protesting each and every violation of civil and canon law on the part of the Commissioners of the French government. On 19 February, Thiollaz was arrested, sent to Chambéry for trial, convicted and sentenced to transportation to French Guyana. He was sent to Belley, then to Lyon, then to Marseille, then to Toulouse, and finally to the Fort de Hâ at Bordeaux. A few weeks later, thanks to a change in political attitude of Bordeaux to the National Assembly in Paris, Thiollaz was released, and he took ship for Dover and then Bruxelles; by way of the Rhine, he reached Mainz and finally Lausanne on 8 August 1793.

The 460 electors of the new Constitutional Church met in Annecy on 17 February 1793, but were unable to reach a majority for any candidate until 6 March 1793, when 241 electors chose a professor from the college of Annecy, François-Thérèse Panisset. He was consecrated in Lyon on 7 April by three constitutional bishops. He resigned his priesthood on 5 February 1794.

From March 1799 to July 1800, Provost de Thiollez was in Venice, evading French agents. On 21 March 1800, he participated along with Bishop Paget in the coronation of Pope Pius VII.

Under the rule of the First Consul Napoleon, the Canton of Geneva was annexed to France. Writing from exile in Turin on 21 November 1801, the bishop of Geneva, Joseph-Marie Paget, at the request of Pope Pius VII, submitted his resignation as bishop. The pope, then, in fulfilment of earlier agreements with the French government, suppressed the Diocese of Geneva, and annexed its territory to the new Diocese of Chambéry. The first bishop of Chambéry was René des Monstiers de Mérinville (1802–1805), who had been bishop of the suppressed diocese of Dijon; he appointed Thiollez as the Provost of the new cathedral Chapter of Chambéry.

On 18 and 19 November 1804, Chambéry was visited by Pope Pius VII, who was on his way to Paris for the coronation of Napoleon as Emperor of the French. Bishop de Mérinville took the opportunity to request the pope to allow him to resign his office of bishop of Chambéry, as a burden too heavy for his abilities. The request was granted, and implemented on 5 February 1805. The new bishop, Irénée-Yves de Solle (1805–1821), reappointed Thiollez and François Bigex (future bishop of Pinerolo (1817–1824), and archbishop of Chambéry, 1824–1827) his vicars-general, and Chambéry was honored by a visit of the new Emperor Napoleon in May, as he travelled to Milan for his coronation as King of Italy. The fall of Napoleon in 1815 brought to an end the French domination of the cities of Chambéry and Annecy.

The Bull "Beati Petri," signed by Pope Pius VII on 17 July 1817, made Chambéry, which had been assigned to the Kingdom of Sardinia (1720–1861) by the Congress of Vienna, the seat of an archdiocese, with the diocese of Aosta as a suffragan.

In 1819, Pope Pius VII united the City of Geneva and twenty of its parishes with the Diocese of Lausanne. In 1822, due to changes in international borders which had placed the territory of the diocese of Geneva and Annecy in several nations, the area belonging to the diocese of Geneva but beyond the borders of Switzerland became the Diocese of Annecy.

=== Establishment of the diocese ===
Annecy was made an episcopal see on 15 February 1822, at the request of the recently deceased King Victor Emmanuel I of Sardinia, by Pope Pius VII, in the papal bull Sollicita catholici gregis. The parish church of Saint Peter in Chains (San Pietro in vincoli) was raised to the status of a cathedral, and given a cathedral Chapter, consisting of three dignities (Provost, Archdeacon, and Cantor) and ten canons. The right to nominate the provost belonged to the pope, the archdeacon and cantor belonged to the King of Sardinia, and the ten canons to the king. In addition to the two city parishes of Annecy, Saint Peter in Chains and Saint Maurice, the diocese was assigned 282 other parishes. The new diocese of Annecy was made a suffragan of the archdiocese of Chambéry.

On 30 August 1824, Pope Leo XII authorized the transfer of the parish which had been located at the cathedral to the church of Nôtre-Dame.

The first bishop of Annecy, Claude-François de Thiollaz, was nominated by King Charles Felix of Sardinia on 21 April 1822. Thiollaz attempted to refuse the nomination, even writing to Pope Pius VII that he was old (70, in fact), and citing numerous examples of saintly persons and theologians who had successfully refused the episcopate. His case was referred to a committee of cardinals, who rejected his arguments, and he was required to accept the post.

The revolutions of 1848 had dramatic consequences for the Kingdom of Sardinia. In 1850, a law received the king's assent, which deprived the clergy of their privileges and immunities, including the right of clergy and religious orders to acquire property in Piedmont. The Society of Jesus (Jesuits) was expelled from the Kingdom of Sardinia and Piedmont in 1855. By a law passed on 28 May 1855, all the convents and monasteries in the country were suppressed. "In all, some 334 religious congregations, with about 5,500 members, were suppressed."

=== Annecy annexed to France ===
By the Treaty of Turin between the French Emperor, Napoleon III, and the King of Sardinia, Victor Emmanuel II, signed on 24 March 1860, Savoy and Nice were annexed by France. On 31 December 1860, Pope Pius IX sent an apostolic brief to the archbishop of Chambéry and the bishops of Annecy and of Nice, announcing that, inasmuch as they were now part of the French Empire, the terms of the apostolic letter of Pope Pius VII of 15 July 1801, and the bull "Ecclesia Christi" of 18 September 1801, now were held to apply to their dioceses as well.

A Commission for Physical Resources was created in 1966, and a new policy for management of property was set in place. It was determined that the Major Seminary building was being under-utilized, and it was therefore sold, and the proceeds used to construct a new "Centre diocesan de formation," to which the candidates for the priesthood were relocated.

=== Notables of the diocese ===
The memory of Bernard of Menthon (died 1081), founder of the hospice of the Grand St. Bernard, is still honoured in the Diocese of Annecy.

Bishop Francis de Sales of Geneva and Jane Frances de Chantal founded the Congregation of the Visitation at Annecy in 1610. The house in Annecy was closed by the French revolutionary government in 1792, and not restored until 1824. The remains of the founders are preserved in the Church of the Visitation at Annecy. Due to the increasing urbanization of Annecy after World War II, the house of the contemplative Visitation Order had to be moved from Annecy to Tournon.

The ancient Benedictine abbey of Talloires, whose church was consecrated in 1031, is near the Lac d'Annecy. In 1572, Prior Claude de Granier, who was later bishop of Geneva (1578–1602), attempted a reform of the monastery in accordance with the decrees of the Council of Trent, but was met with the opposition of 15 of his 20 monks. On 3 April 1794, the abbey was auctioned off on orders of the French commissioners.

== Bishops of Annecy ==
- Claude-François de Thiollaz (21 Apr 1822 Appointed – 14 Mar 1832 Died)
- Pierre-Joseph Rey (1832–1842)
- Louis Rendu (25 Aug 1842 Appointed – 28 Aug 1859 Died)
- Charles-Marie Magnin (1861–1879)
- Louis-Romain-Ernest Isoard (9 May 1879 Appointed – 3 Aug 1901 Died)
- Pierre-Lucien Campistron (1902–1921)
- Florent-Michel-Marie-Joseph du Bois de la Villerabel (21 Nov 1921 Appointed – 1940)
- Auguste-Léon-Alexis Cesbron (30 Sep 1940 Appointed – 13 Jul 1962 Died)
- Jean-Baptiste-Étienne Sauvage (28 Sep 1962 Appointed – 27 Sep 1983 Retired)
- Hubert Marie Pierre Dominique Barbier (19 May 1984 Appointed – 2000)
- Yves Boivineau (7 May 2001 Appointed – 27 Jun 2022 Retired)
- Yves Le Saux (27 Jun 2022 Appointed – present)

== See also ==
- Roman Catholic Diocese of Geneva (historical, with list of bishops)
- Roman Catholic Archdiocese of Chambéry–Saint-Jean-de-Maurienne–Tarentaise
- Catholic Church in France
- List of Catholic dioceses in France
- Abbey of Entremont
- Abbey of Sainte-Catherine-du-Mont in Annecy

== Bibliography ==
=== Reference works ===
- Gams, Pius Bonifatius (1873). Series episcoporum Ecclesiae catholicae: quotquot innotuerunt a beato Petro apostolo. Ratisbon: Typis et Sumptibus Georgii Josephi Manz. (Use with caution; obsolete)
- Ritzler, Remigius; Sefrin, Pirminus (1968). Hierarchia Catholica medii et recentioris aevi sive summorum pontificum, S. R. E. cardinalium, ecclesiarum antistitum series... A pontificatu Pii PP. VII (1800) usque ad pontificatum Gregorii PP. XVI (1846) (in Latin). Vol. VII. Monasterii: Libr. Regensburgiana.
- Ritzler, Remigius; Sefrin, Pirminus (1978). Hierarchia catholica Medii et recentioris aevi... A Pontificatu PII PP. IX (1846) usque ad Pontificatum Leonis PP. XIII (1903) (in Latin). Vol. VIII. Il Messaggero di S. Antonio.
- Pięta, Zenon (2002). Hierarchia catholica medii et recentioris aevi... A pontificatu Pii PP. X (1903) usque ad pontificatum Benedictii PP. XV (1922) (in Latin). Vol. IX. Padua: Messagero di San Antonio. ISBN 978-88-250-1000-8.

=== Studies ===
- Baud, Henri; Binz, Louis (1985). Le Diocèse de Genève-Annecy. (in French). Annecy: Editions Beauchesne, 1985.
- Burdet, Aimé (1884), Le palais de l'Isle à Annecy: récit historique des deux premières années de la Révolution française. (in French). Annecy: F Abry, 1804
- Mugnier, François (1888). Notes & documents inédits sur les évêques de Genève-Annecy (1535-1879). (in French and Latin). Paris: Champion, 1888 .
- Société bibliographique (France) (1907). L'épiscopat français depuis le Concordat jusqu'à la Séparation (1802-1905). Paris: Librairie des Saints-Pères.
