= Jan G.F. Veldhuis =

- Born: 4 October 1938 (age 87); Hengelo
- Education: Utrecht University
- Occupation: President
- Employer: Utrecht University (1986-2003)
- Children: 3
- Awards: Officier in de Orde van Oranje Nassau (Netherlands); Legion of Honour - Knight; Encomienda de Numero de la Orden de Isabel la Católica (Spain)

Johannes Gerardus Franciscus (Jan) Veldhuis (born 4 October 1938 in Hengelo) is a Dutch administrator/governor in the fields of scientific education and research, healthcare and culture, nationally and internationally. His last post was president of Utrecht University, from 1986 until 2003. He still holds various part-time governance positions.

== Education ==
Veldhuis got the gymnasium-A diploma at the gymnasium of the archbishop's seminary in Apeldoorn, 1951-1957. After two additional years philosophy study at the Philosophicum Dijnselburg in Huis ter Heide, he in 1959 started (modern) history, economics and constitutional and administrative law in Utrecht. He was active in the administration and governance of students and university organizations: praeses Collegii Studiosorum 'Veritas', then the largest students organization in the Netherlands, and vice-chairman of the first 'democratic' Students Council (Grondraad) of the university. This brought him into direct contact with the –in the eyes of many—outdated university governance structure. He also was member-secretary of Commission XII (Youth-Education) of the—internationally sensational—Dutch Pastoral Council of the Roman Catholic Church. For modern history he wrote a thesis about the Dutch 'Plan of Labor' of the 1930s, and for economics about 'The Economics of Education'. He graduated in July 1967, and got a Fulbright scholarship for a comparative study of the Dutch 'Plan of the Labor' and the American 'New Deal' at the University of Minnesota, this in the politically dramatic year 1967–1968.

== Career ==
Veldhuis began his career in Sept.1968 at the Ministry of Foreign Affairs, European Cooperation. He was involved in the European trade policy, esp. towards Central- and East-European countries, and in Benelux- and OECD-cooperation. He was among the 10 signatories of the manifesto of 1970, that led to 'the uprising of the young officials ' ('de opstand van de jonge referendarissen') and then to the integration of the ministry (binnendienst) and the diplomatic service (buitendienst).

When the 1970 Act Reforming the University Governance Structure (WUB / Law Veringa) took effect, Veldhuis turned back to his first functional love: he accepted at Leiden University a function, created to implement this WUB. Late 1972 he became head of the Governance and Law Office', and secretary of the newly formed (executive) board of the university.

In 1974 he was appointed deputy permanent secretary-general of the Ministry of Education and Science (O & W) to the permanent secretary-general Maarten Van Wolferen, and the Minister Jos van Kemenade (1973–1977), who in 1973 had started his constructive education policy (Contourennota). Veldhuis had secondary education as a special area (middenschool-debate). Also, he chaired the team of the planning for the McKinsey reorganization of the inspectorate of education. In November 1978 he led the O & W -team, that supported Minister Arie Pais (1977–1981) in the 'Aantjes- affair'.

In 1979 Veldhuis was appointed director-general services education and inspectorate (DGDI), also inspector-general of education (IGO). In these positions he was faced with difficult policy issues: as DG with Minister Pais especially the mergers of teacher training colleges, and with Minister Wim Deetman(1982–1989) the significant budget cuts of the Lubbers cabinet, including the lowering of teachers' salaries; and as IGO with the implementation of the new organization of the inspectorate, the setting up of an inspectorate for the universities, and with the pupils fraud, especially in primary schools, connected with the very rapid decrease of the birth rate, 28% in the years 1969–1977. Veldhuis was one of the first who —after 25 years emphasis on equal opportunities— asked attention again, despite political opposition, for also the quality of education. This got him in 1983 the participation in the U.S. International Visitor Leadership Program for research into the 'Quality of Education in the USA'. His reporting led to a notorious publication in the leading Dutch newspaper NRC, and to a separate chapter – of his hand - on the quality of education in the explanatory memorandum to the O & W 1985 budget. With the U.S. ambassador Paul Bremer III he, as representative of Minister Deetman, innovated the Dutch Fulbright program. In 1985 he became chairman of the board of the Fulbright Commission, a subsidiary function he performed the following 16 years. In this period he—together with Paul Bremer and Fulbright-director Marcel Oomen—connected Fulbright fellowships with the fellowships of the Netherland-America Foundation, NAF, in New York.

Starting 1986 Veldhuis was appointed by Minister Deetman, president (chairman of the board) of Utrecht University, as the ninth president in fourteen years. He there succeeded former cabinet minister Leendert Ginjaar.

In his first years he was confronted with much opposition inside the university. The provision with a university car—the same provision as his predecessor got— caused a lot of protests: questions in the Dutch parliament, disapproval of the item concerned in the university budget, formal appeal by his board to the Council of State and final approval after nearly two years. In the University Council and in the university newspaper the attitude towards him often was of a negative, sometimes hostile nature. He was considered as a 'man from outside', a "Hague bureaucrat" and/or "a satrap of Minister Deetman". But he withstood, and, with the loyal backing of his colleagues, he gradually got the necessary support and confidence to restore in the university the much needed governance balance and stability.

Within two years the budget was balanced again. And despite strong resistance —with a strike, an occupation of the main administrative building and a short cause in court in May 1988—the Board under his leadership carried through a major reorganization of the university: 'Bestuurlijke Vernieuwing/Governance Renewal 1987-1991'. Among others the size of the central university office was reduced from about 800 officials to about 250, by not filling vacancies anymore, dismissals, decentralization and (semi-)privatizations. This operation was deliberately combined with a strategic process of renewal and profiling of the primary processes, education and research: 'RUU 2001/Utrecht University towards 2001'. These two operations were repeated in the mid 90s for another period of ten years. In the view of many Veldhuis and rector Van Ginkel and later on rector Gispen were the major sources of inspiration and the main architects of the remarkable renaissance in the recent decades of this ancient university. They were supported by an administrative office of increasing quality (under the direction of Wim Kardux, Maarten Rook, Erwin Vermeulen, Joop Kessels). These strategic operations had many results, among which some remarkable ones, also nationwide:

- Education

Modernization of the educational process by requiring from students basic involvement, and for university teachers basic and senior qualifications (wp-flow; bko and sko): this 'Utrecht education model', sharpened with the introduction of the European Bachelor-Master-model, led to 20% higher outputs than the national average; foundation (initiative prof. Hans Adriaansens), and especially administrative and financial implementation of the University College Utrecht bèta-marketing: increasing the inflow of students into the science departments;

- scientific research: concentration and priorities areas(initiative rector Hans van Ginkel); strategic alliances with business; research companies; start of the Science Park Utrecht;
- Education and research

About 15 new programs, a.o. full-fledged Economics, Public Administration, and Physiotherapy Science; the formation of the UMC Utrecht (University Hospital) with insertion of the famous Eye Hospital, the Ooglijdersgasthuis, and the Wilhelmina Children's Hospital, WKZ (together with Gerlach Cerfontaine and Willem Hendrik Gispen); formation of the Academic Biomedical Cluster, ABC (initiative Willem Hendrik Gispen); and the establishment of TNO-NITG (with rector Harry Voorma); university professors Frits van Oostrom, Herman Philipse, Paul Schnabel and Peter van der Veer.

- Internationalisation

Utrecht Network in Europe (with Jeroen Torenbeek, Henk van Rinsum, Bettina Nelemans); special alliances with top universities in the US and Asia;

- A variety of special provisions for personnel and students, a.o. the renovation of the Academy Building (with Bas Nugteren) and the founding of the Faculty Club;
- A new alumni program, national and international (with Leneke Visser);
- A prominent long standing housing program with appealing architecture (Hans van Ginkel and Aryan Sikkema).

These and other informal activities contributed to community engagement among university personnel and students and supported new academic and institutional initiatives.

On behalf of the Association of Dutch Universities, VSNU, Veldhuis for many years chaired te Education Committee, StOA, in charge of among others the reduction of the number of academic courses (by 50%), the preparation of the replacement in the secondary school curriculum of the 270 different 'packages'(pakketten) by 4 'profiles'(profielen) and the renovation of the history curriculum in the secondary schools (restoration of chronology according to the proposals of the committee of Roel de Wit and that of Piet de Rooy)

Veldhuis in 1995 was conferred a doctorate h.c. by the University of Florida, USA, and in 1997, 1998 and 2001 he was decorated by respectively the governments of France, the Netherlands and Spain.

In the spring of 1997 his board briefly got into political trouble by a salary increase, after ten years of no change of about 20%. The problem was quickly and smoothly discarded. A few years later the salaries of the board members of all Dutch universities in a nationwide leveling up were increased by about 60%. The affair did not harm the position and authority of the board.

- In 1997 rector Hans van Ginkel was appointed rector of the United Nations University, headquarters Tokyo.
- In 1999 two Utrecht professors got the Nobel Prize for physics: Martinus Veltman and Gerard 't Hooft.
- In 2001 the king of Spain Juan Carlos was awarded an honorary doctorate of Utrecht University.
- In 2002 the Prince Claus Chair was established, with Princess/Queen Maxima as chair of the Board of Curators (initiative of rector Gispen and prof. Bas de Gaay Fortman)

The term of board membership being 4 years Veldhuis was reappointed four times. In 2003 he retired after 18 years of presidency. Utrecht University then not only had become the largest university of the Netherlands, but according to Elsevier Magazine also the best teaching university, and according to the international Shanghai- and CHE- rankings, and later on also the THESS-ranking, the best research university as well.

Veldhuis after his retirement performed and still performs many other functions. These included and include:

- Member of the supervisory board of the Netherlands Organisation for Applied Scientific Research, TNO, Delft (2003–2008);
- Chairman of the board of the Netherlands Society for International Affairs, NGIZ, department Utrecht (1995–2008);
- Chairman of the board of 'Quality Assurance Netherlands Universities', QANU, Utrecht (2004-..)
- Chairman of the supervisory board of the 'Netherlands Universities Foundation For International Education', NUFFIC, The Hague
- Chairman of the board of the 'Foundation Carmelcollege(s)', Hengelo
- Chairman of the board of the hospital 'Diakonessenhuis' Utrecht-Zeist-Doorn
- Member of the advisory board of the 'Dutch Institute for War Documentation', NIOD, Amsterdam
- Member of the supervisory board of the 'Roosevelt Study Center', Middelburg
- President of the Netherlands chapter of the Societé des Membres de la Légion d'Honneur (SMLH) The Hague-Paris (2012- )
- Evaluation Committees in the field of university education and research:
  - member: Australian National University (2004/5), Gent University (2008/9) and Dutch Open university Heerlen (2011);
  - chair: Erasmus University Rotterdam (2012), Tilburg University (2012)and University of Amsterdam (2012/2013).

In 2009 Veldhuis still belonged to the top 200 of the most influential Dutchmen.

Jan Veldhuis is married since 1968 to Monica M.H. Thier (1942), a physiotherapist. They have three sons, born in 1973, 1974 and 1977; and six grandchildren, born in 2004, 2005, 2007, 2010, 2012 and 2015.

== Awards and Prizes ==
- 1952 Excellency prize Gymnasium Apeldoorn
- 1983 Fellow, International Visitor Leadership Program, USA
- 1995 Doctor h.c. University of Florida at Gainesville, USA
- 1997 Knight in France's Legion of Honour
- 1998 Officer of the Order of Orange Nassau, Kingdom of the Netherlands
- 2001 Commander (Encomienda the Numero) of the Order of Isabel la Católica, Kingdom of Spain
- 2003 Gold Medal City of Utrecht
- 2003 Medal of the province of Utrecht
- 2003 Silver medal of Utrecht University
- 2003 Medal University Medical Center Utrecht, UMC Utrecht
- 2003 President's Medal University of Florida at Gainesville, Florida, USA
- 2003 International Medal University of Coimbra, Portugal
- 2003 600th Foundation Day Medal University of Cracow, Poland
- 2005 Ambassador K. Terry Dornbush Award from the Netherlands-America Foundation, NAF, Washington DC, USA
- 2005 Distinguished Leadership Award for Internationals, University of Minnesota, Minneapolis, USA.

== Publications ==
- Dies-lecture on the occasion of the 74th anniversary of the Collegium Studiosorum Veritas, about secularisation, Vox vertatis 25 May 1963
- "Het einde is zoek-en", contribution to the book 'Kerk en Universiteit', 1965, H. Nelissen, Bilthoven
- "Universiteit en democratisering (de vuurproef voor de WUB)", contribution to the book 'Bij het afscheid van de Leidse hofstee', Groen and Zoon, Leiden 1978, ISBN 90-238-0928-9
- "Beheerst adviseren", in: 'Adviesorganen: minder en beter, Den Haag, 5 March 1985
- "De School en de Hoofdzaken; De middelmatigheid van het Amerikaanse onderwijs", NRC-Handelsblad, 27 October 1983, pages 17 etc.
- "Ik ben niet voor het paradijs geboren", interview in het Utrechts Universiteitsblad, Oct.15, 1992, pages 11–13
- "(Ont)bindende krachten binnen de Universiteit", speech symposium Alumnibeleid Leiden, Nov.16, 1993
- Vermeulen Erwin, and van Kammen, Kathelijne: "Iets nieuws onder de zon? Invoering van Bachelor-Master aan de Universiteit Utrecht"; deel 1: 'Het onderwijsconcept', deel 2: 'Het onderwijsproces', in : THEMA 2002, nrs 3 and 4
- "The last word: an epilogue and a prologue", in: 'Academie in Verandering', Negen reflecties op universitair bestuur, onder eindredactie van Prof.dr. Adriaan Dorresteijn and Dr Joop Kessels, Universiteit Utrecht, 2003, ISBN 978-90-393-3569-7
- Many speeches, articles and interviews during his presidency of Utrecht University, among which addresses at the Opening Academic Years of Utrecht University 1986-2003 * "Vijf bestuursinstrumenten. Een terugblik op 18 jaar universitair bestuur", in: THEMA, 2–2005, pp. 4–9
- "Multidisciplinary Economics: the Birth of a new Economics Faculty in the Netherlands", Peter de Gijsel and Hans Schenk eds., introductory chapter by Jan G.F. Veldhuis, Kluwer 2005
- Leon van de Zande: "Investeren in onderwijs loont. Strategische keuze in het onderwijsbeleid van de Universiteit Utrecht", in: THEMA 2008, nr. 4.
- "Excellence and Egalitarianism and in Higher Education", contribution to the book 'Discovering the Dutch. On Culture and Society of the Netherlands', Emmeline Besamusca en Jaap Verheul, eds., Amsterdam University Press 2010, ISBN 978-90-8964-100-7; 688 NUR
- Armand Heijnen: "125 jaar Utrechts Universiteitsfonds", ed. by Utrechts Universiteitsfonds 2011
- Prof.dr.N.L. Dodde: "IGO's in beeld. De ontwikkeling van de Inspectie van het Onderwijs en de rol van inspecteurs-generaal vanaf 1955"; ed. by Inspectie van het Onderwijs 2011–23; ISBN 978-90-8503-256-4
- Hendrik Edelman: "The Netherland-America Foundation 1921-2011. A History"; The Netherland-America Foundation, Inc. 2012; ISBN 978-1-4675-2909-9
- Armand Heijnen : "Nobelprijzen in Utrecht. Utrechtse natuurkundigen van wereldniveau", in : Oud-Utrecht, # 5, oktober 2019, pp. 162–165.

== See also ==
- Legion of Honour
- List of Legion of Honour recipients by name (V)
- List of foreign recipients of the Legion of Honour by country
- Legion of Honour Museum
