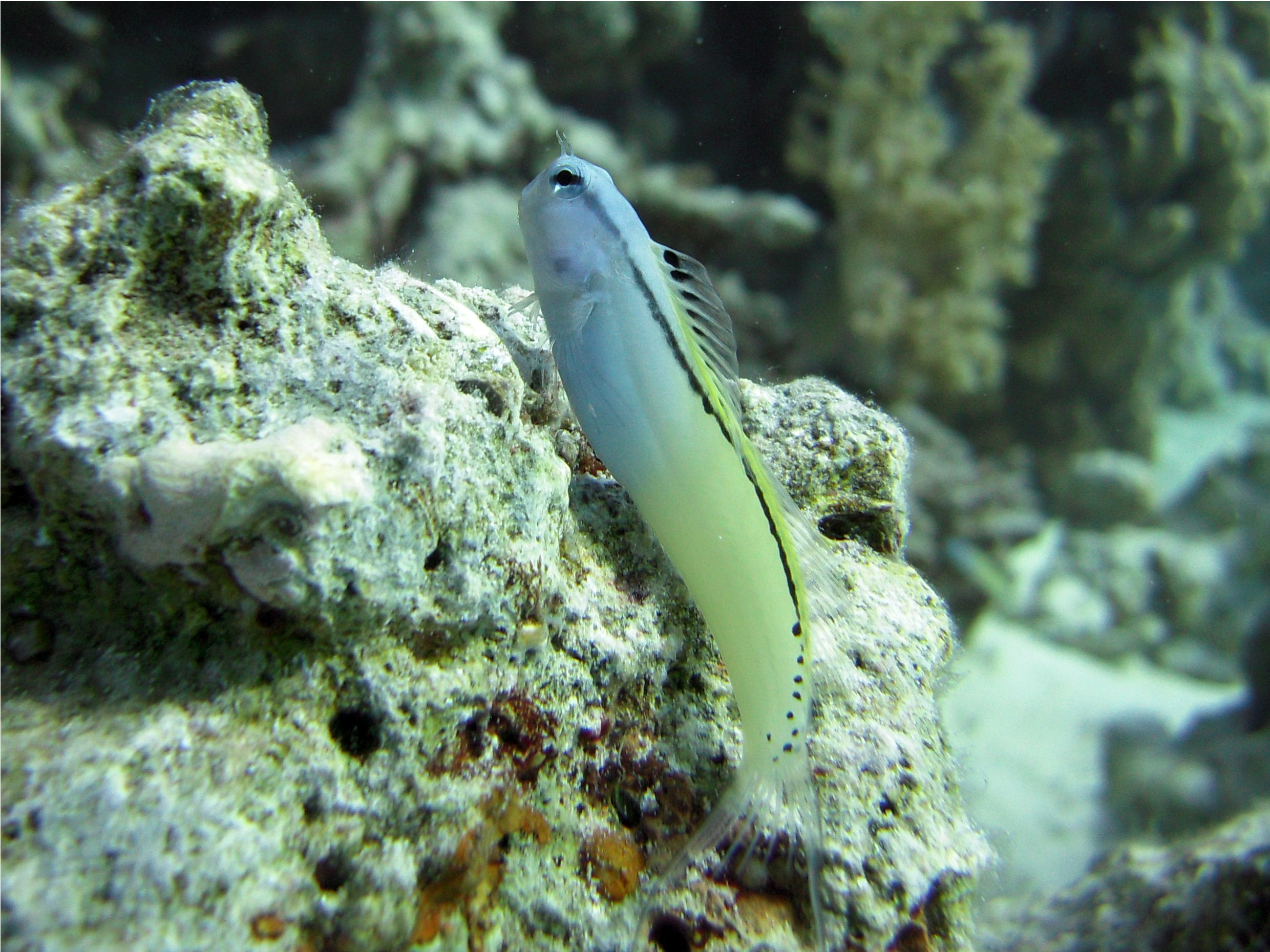

Conservation status
- Least Concern (IUCN 3.1)

Scientific classification
- Kingdom: Animalia
- Phylum: Chordata
- Class: Actinopterygii
- Division: Teleostei
- Order: Blenniiformes
- Family: Blenniidae
- Genus: Ecsenius
- Species: E. gravieri

Binomial name
- Ecsenius gravieri (Pellegrin, 1906)

Synonyms
- Salarias gravieri Pellegrin, 1906; Ecsenius klausewitzii Lotan, 1970

= Ecsenius gravieri =

Species of fish

Ecsenius gravieri, the Red Sea mimic blenny, is a blenny from the Western Indian Ocean. It occasionally makes its way into the aquarium trade. It grows to a size of 8 cm in length. The specific name honours the French zoologist Charles Gravier (1865–1937), the collector of the type.
