= Abbey of Sainte-Catherine-du-Mont in Annecy =

French monastic institution

- Location within France
- Interactive map of Abbey of Sainte-Catherine-du-Mont in Annecy

Monastery information
- Established: 1160
- Disestablished: 1772
- Diocese: Geneva, Annecy

People
- House superior: Cîteaux Abbey; Haute-Savoie; Rhône-Alpes; County of Savoy

Site
- Location: Annecy
- Country: France
- Coordinates: 45°52′15″N 64°06′45″E

The Abbey of Sainte-Catherine-du-Mont was a monastic institution established in the 12th or 13th century in the area that is now the commune of Annecy, in Haute-Savoie. It was located in a secluded valley on the slopes of the Semnoz mountain, known as the Sainte-Catherine valley. The abbey was closed in 1772, and its members were transferred to a convent in the city center.

== Location ==
The former convent, now in ruins, is situated in a hollow of the Semnoz mountain, approximately 3.5 kilometers from the center of Annecy and 238 meters higher in elevation, at 630 meters above sea level. The path that passes through this area remains known as the “Chemin de Sainte-Catherine.”

== History ==
=== Foundation ===
The Abbey of Sainte-Catherine-du-Mont is traditionally attributed to Margaret of Geneva, also known as Beatrix, daughter of Count William I of Geneva. The exact date of its foundation remains uncertain. Two commonly cited dates are 1179 and 1228. However, Marguerite is believed to have been born around 1180, making the earlier date unlikely. By 1228, various sources suggest that the monastic community was already in existence, although it may not yet have held the formal status of an abbey.

François Mugnier concluded that the foundation of the Abbey of Sainte-Catherine-du-Mont occurred before 1195 and was therefore not established directly by Marguerite of Geneva. Instead, she may have been responsible for raising the establishment to the status of an abbey. The first nuns are believed to have come from the Abbey of Bonlieu, located in present-day Sallenôves, approximately twenty kilometers northwest of the site.

The portico of the abbey is thought to have housed the tomb of Count William I of Geneva, who likely died on 25 July 1195.

=== In the Middle Ages ===
In 1242, a dispute arose regarding the affiliation of the Abbey of Sainte-Catherine-du-Mont, as its nuns sought to end their filial dependence on the Abbey of Bonlieu. Mediating abbots intervened and a compromise was reached: in exchange for the payment of a rent, Sainte-Catherine was granted independence from Bonlieu.

Following this resolution, the abbey experienced a period of prosperity, during which it established two daughter houses near Lake Geneva: Bellerive, located in present-day Collonge-Bellerive (Switzerland), and Petit-Lieu, in Perrignier.

=== In the 17th century ===
On March 4, 1607, Louise de Ballon took her solemn vows at the Abbey of Sainte-Catherine-du-Mont at the age of sixteen, having resided there since the age of seven with one of her sisters. At the time, the abbey was regarded more favorably than its mother house, Bonlieu. In 1622, seeking a more rigorous form of religious life, she left the abbey to pursue reform. With the support of Bishop François de Sales, she founded the Order of the Reformed Bernardines, which established its first convent in Rumilly and later expanded throughout Savoy and southeastern France.

=== Transfer to Annecy ===
After the departure of Louise de Ballon, the Abbey of Sainte-Catherine-du-Mont retained many of its previous customs, including the personal ownership of property by the nuns and the lack of strict enclosure. However, a renewed sense of religious fervor gradually emerged.

In 1772, the abbey was relocated to the city center of Annecy, to the site formerly occupied by the Bonlieu convent since 1648, corresponding to the present-day location of the Pâquier and the cultural center.

=== Revolution ===
A faience factory was established in the former abbey and operated under the direction of Jean-Claude Burnod, a lawyer, syndic-prosecutor of Annecy, and member of the Arcades literary academy in Rome.

== Necropolis of the House of Geneva ==
The convent is regarded as the customary burial site of the princes of the House of Geneva since its foundation. This funerary function was shared with the Charterhouse of Pomier. The site is believed to have contained the tombs of the Counts of Geneva and members of their family:

- William I
- Agnes of Montfaucon, wife of Count Aymon II
- Amadeus II

According to Edmond Martène and Ursin Durand in Voyage littéraire de deux bénédictins de la Congrégation de Saint-Maur (1717), the tomb of Guy of Geneva, Bishop of Langres, was also located at the site, alongside those of his father, Count William II, and his uncles.

== Notable figures of Saint-Catherine-du-Mont ==
The abbey was under the authority of a prioress (1179–1250), then of an abbess (1251–1793). François Mugnier provides a catalog accompanied by notes on the prioresses in his work (1895).

- 1251–1279: Agatha of Geneva
- 1279–1307: Beatrix of Compeys or of Thorens
- 1307–1340: Margaret of Miolans
- 1340–1360: Guigonne Alamand, of Saint-Jeoire or Saint-Jorioz
- 1360–1410: Péronne de Crescherel
- 1410–1425: Jacquemete de Menthon
- 1425–1474: Aynarde of Saint-Jeoire
- 1474–1492: Catherine Blanc (Alba)
- 1492–1510: Anne of Saint-Jeoire
- 1511–1561: Bernarde de Menthon
- 1560/61–1570: Françoise de Beaufort
- 1576–1586: Pernette de Bellegarde
- 1586–1587: Claudine de Chevron Villette
- 1587–1600: Jeanne de Maillard-Tournon
- 1600–1610: Claudine de Menthon-La Balme
- 1610–1633 (?): Pernette de Cerizier, coadjutrix since 1605
- 1633–1640: Françoise de Regard-Chanay, coadjutrix since 1632
- 1640–1672: Charlotte-Françoise de Vallon
- 1672–1714: Christine Carron de Saint-Thomas, coadjutrix since 1671
- ... : Françoise-Balthazarde de Bellegarde-d'Entremont, although her election was not approved by the king
- 1716–1733: Marie-Victoire de Menthon
- 1733–1770: Françoise-Gasparde de Madelaine-La Tour

In 1770, the abbey was governed by a prioress, Marie-François Duboin, until its dissolution during the occupation of the duchy by French revolutionary troops.

== See also ==
- Convent
- Margaret of Geneva
- Roman Catholic Diocese of Geneva
- Roman Catholic Diocese of Annecy

== Bibliography ==
- Baud, Henri; Mariotte, Jean-Yves Mariotte; Challamel, Jean-Bernard; Guerrier, Alain (1981). Histoire des communes savoyardes. Le Genevois et Lac d'Annecy (Tome III) [History of Savoyard communes. Genevois and Lake Annecy (Volume III)] (in French). Roanne: Éditions Horvath. ISBN 2-7171-0200-0.
- Baud, Henri; Binz, Louis; Brunel, Robert; Coutin, Paul; Devos, Roger; Guichonnet, Paul; Mariotte, Jean-Yves; Mariotte, Mariotte (1985). Le Diocèse de Genève-Annecy [The Diocese of Geneva-Annecy]. Histoire des diocèses de France (in French). Paris: Editions Beauchesne. ISBN 2-7010-1112-4.
- Duparc, Pierre (1978). Le comté de Genève, (IXe – XVe siècles) [The County of Geneva (9th - 15th centuries)]. Mémoires et documents (in French). Vol. XXXIX. Geneva: Société d’histoire et d’archéologie de Genève.
- Guerrier, Alain (2002). Louise de Ballon : (1591-1668) (PDF) (in French). ARCIS.
- Mugnier, François (1886). Histoire documentaire de l'abbaye de Sainte-Catherine (près d'Annecy) [Documentary history of Sainte-Catherine Abbey (near Annecy)] (in French). CP Ménard. p. 4.
