= Ravier =

Ravier is a French surname. Notable people with the surname include:

- Daniel Ravier (born 1948), French football player
- Gustave Ravier (1850–1918), French politician
- Guy Ravier (1937–2023), French politician
- Jean-Christophe Ravier (born 1979), French racing driver
- Stéphane Ravier (born 1969), French politician
