= Mount St. Louis =

Mountain in Graham Land, Antarctica

Mount St. Louis (67°9′S 67°30′W) is a mountain on Arrowsmith Peninsula in Graham Land, Antarctica. Its ice-covered slopes rise to 1,280 m (4,200 ft), making it a prominent landmark immediately east of The Gullet. It was first sighted and roughly charted in 1909 by the French Antarctic Expedition (FAE) under J.B. Charcot. Surveyed in 1948 by the Falkland Islands Dependencies Survey (FIDS) who named it for Canadian pilot Peter B. St. Louis.
