= Annecy Cathedral =

Cathedral in Haute-Savoie, France

Coordinates: 45°53′57″N 6°7′32″E

Annecy Cathedral Cathédrale Saint-Pierre d'Annecy
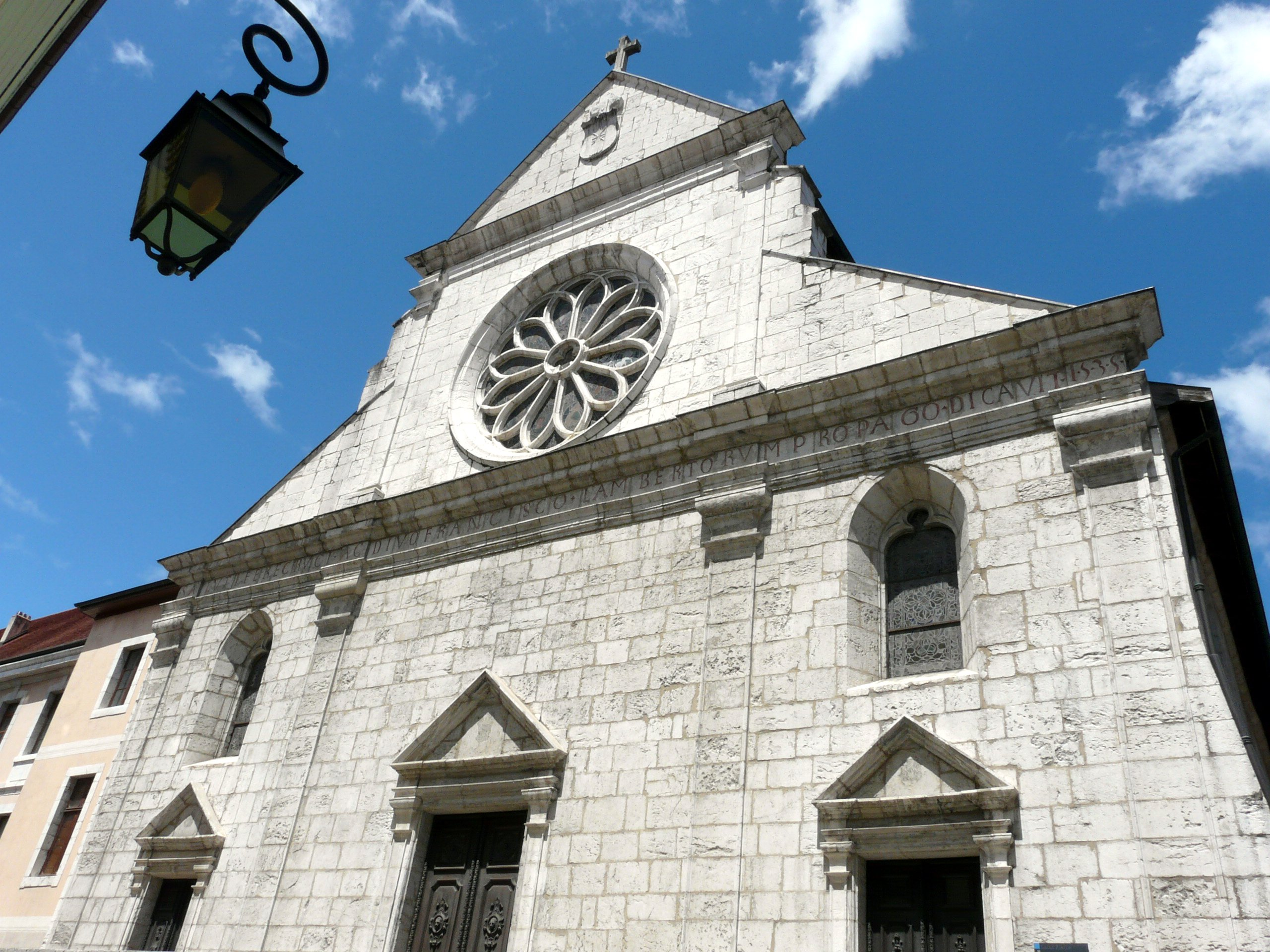
- Annecy Cathedral

Religion
- Affiliation: Roman Catholic Church
- Province: Diocese of Annecy
- Region: Haute Savoie
- Rite: Roman
- Ecclesiastical or organisational status: Cathedral
- Status: Active

Location
- Location: Annecy, France
- Interactive map of Annecy Cathedral; Cathédrale Saint-Pierre d'Annecy

Architecture
- Type: church
- Groundbreaking: 16th century
- Completed: 19th century

Annecy Cathedral (French: Cathédrale Saint-Pierre d'Annecy) is a Roman Catholic church located in Annecy, France. The cathedral is a national monument.

The church was erected at the beginning of the 16th century by Jacques Rossel as a chapel for a Franciscan priory. During the French Revolution, the building was used as a temple of the Goddess Reason. It was raised to the status of a cathedral in 1822, when the Diocese of Annecy was established from the Diocese of Chambéry.

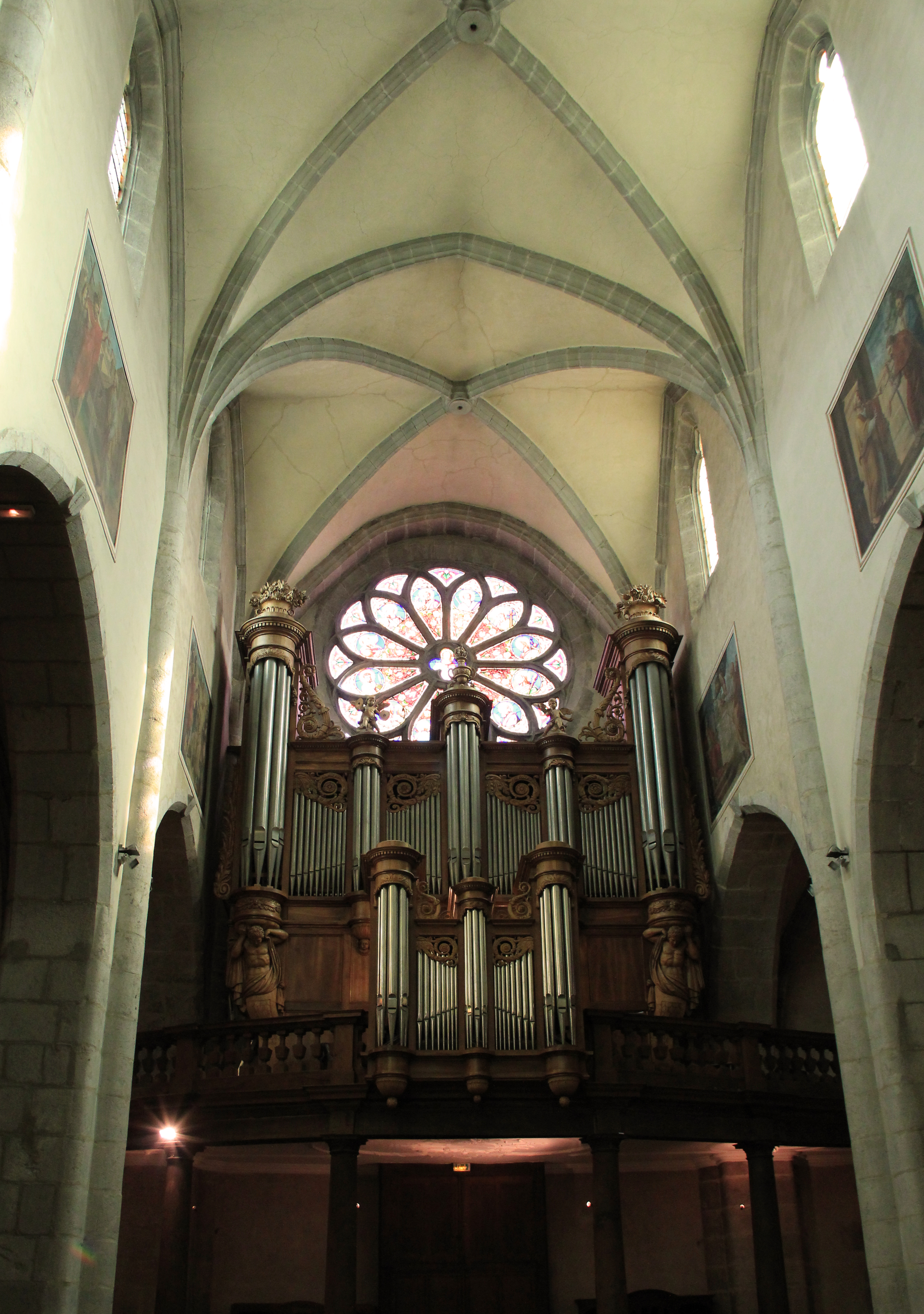
The grand organ in Annecy Cathedral

The organ of the cathedral was built by Nicolas-Antoine Lété, an organ builder of the French king, in 1840–1842.
