= Organ Peak =

Mountain in Antarctica

Organ Peak (66°56′S 67°0′W) is the northernmost peak of Arrowsmith Peninsula, Graham Land. Mapped in 1960 from surveys by Falkland Islands Dependencies Survey (FIDS). The name, which arose locally in 1956, is descriptive; the fluted appearance of this peak resembles the pipes of an organ.
