= Dorsey Mountains =

Mountain range in Graham Land, Antarctica

Mount Lagally

Highest point
- Elevation: 2,046 m (6,713 ft)
- Prominence: 1,291 m (4,236 ft)
- Listing: Ribu

The Dorsey Mountains (67°4′S 67°4′W) are a mountain range just east of Somigliana Glacier in the northern part of the Arrowsmith Peninsula in Graham Land. They were mapped by the Falkland Islands Dependencies Survey (FIDS) from surveys and air photos in 1956 to 1959 and named by the UK Antarctic Place-Names Committee (UK-APC) for Noah Ernest Dorsey, an American physicist.

Vanni Peak was named by UK-APC for Manfredo Vanni, an Italian hydrologist and glaciologist. Mount Lagally stands 3 nautical miles (6 km) south of Vanni Peak. It was named by UK-APC for Max Lagally, a German mathematician and glaciologist.
