= Vany =

Vany may refer to:

- Vany, France, a town in Moselle, Lorraine, France
- Muramoylpentapeptide carboxypeptidase, an enzyme
