= Yves Le Saux =

French prelate of the Catholic Church

Yves Le Saux Comm. l'Emm.
- Bishop of Annecy
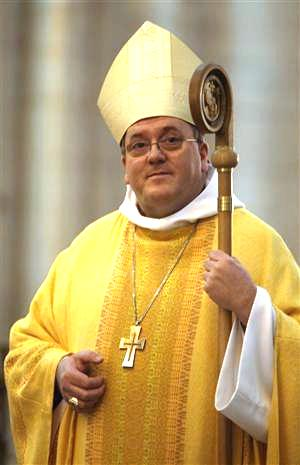
- Le Saux in 2012
- Church: Catholic Church
- Diocese: Diocese of Annecy
- Appointed: 27 June 2022
- Predecessor: Yves Boivineau
- Previous post: Bishop of Le Mans (2008-2022)

Orders
- Ordination: 22 June 1986 by Armand-François Le Bourgeois
- Consecration: 25 January 2009 by André Vingt-Trois

Personal details
- Born: 24 December 1960 (age 65) Hennebont, Morbihan, France

Yves Le Saux (born 1960) is a French prelate of the Catholic Church who was bishop of Le Mans from 2009 to 2022. He has been appointed bishop of Annecy. He is a member of the Emmanuel Community.

== Biography ==
Yves Le Saux was born on 24 December 1960 in Hennebont in Brittany. After completing his classical studies, he attended the Institut Catholique de Paris for a year and then entered the Seminary of Autun as a member of the Emmanuel Community. He studied philosophy and theology at the Institut d'Etudes Théologiques (IET) (Note: The IET was founded in 1968 and closed in 2019.) in Brussels, where he obtained his bachelor’s degree in theology. He was ordained a priest of the Diocese of Autun on 22 June 1986.

He has held pastoral positions in the diocese as well as offices of the Community. He was chaplain at the shrines of Paray-le-Monial and superior of the chaplains from 1992 to 1997; participated in creating the Ecole Internationale de Formation à l'Evangélisation (EIFE) of Paray-le-Monial between 1986 and 1992; Autun's episcopal delegate for the Pastoral Care of the Family from 1995 to 1997; and led the preparatory year for the Emmanuel Community at the Maison Saint-Joseph in Namur, Belgium, from 1997 to 2002. From 2002 to 2008 he was responsible for priests, deacons and seminarians of the same community.

On 21 November 2008, Pope Benedict XVI named him Bishop of Le Mans. He received his episcopal consecration on 25 January 2009.

On 27 June 2022, Pope Francis named him bishop of Annecy.

Within the Conference of French Bishops, Le Saux is president of the editorial committee of KTO-Television, a member of the episcopal commission for consecrated life, and a permanent guest of its council for communication.
