= Bentley Crag =

Crag in Antarctica

Bentley Crag (67°17′S 66°53′W) is a rock crag rising to about 1,000 metres (3,300 ft) north of Seue Peaks on Arrowsmith Peninsula in Graham Land. It was mapped by the Falkland Islands Dependencies Survey from surveys and from air photos, 1956–59, and named by the UK Antarctic Place-Names Committee after Wilson A. Bentley, American meteorologist and specialist in microphotography of snow and ice crystals; joint author with W.J. Humphreys of Snow Crystals.
