= Joseph Vallot =

French scientist

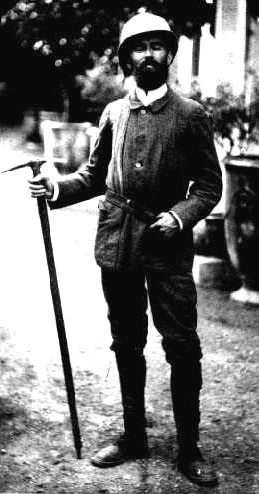
- Vallot in 1892
- Born: 16 February 1854
- Died: 11 April 1925 (aged 71)
- Burial place: Père Lachaise Cemetery
- Known for: Scientific research on Mont Blanc; construction of observatory and mountain refuge
- Children: 3
- Honours: Legion of Honour

Joseph Vallot (French pronunciation: [ʒozɛf valo]; 16 February 1854 – 11 April 1925) was a French scientist, astronomer, botanist, geographer, cartographer and alpinist and "one of the founding fathers of scientific research on Mont Blanc". He is known mainly for his fascination with Mont Blanc, his work in funding and constructing a high-altitude observatory below its summit, and for the years of research work that he and his wife conducted both there, and at their base in Chamonix. Both the observatory and the adjacent refuge that he constructed for use by mountain guides and their clients attempting the Mont Blanc summit still bear his name today, despite being rebuilt.

He received many awards for his scientific achievements, including France's Legion of Honour.

== Life ==
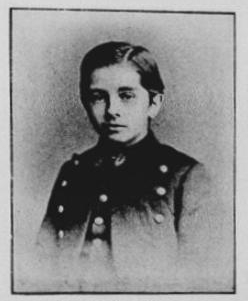
Joseph Vallot at 12 years of age.

Joseph Vallot was born on 16 February 1854 in Lodève in southern France. His father was Émile Vallot and he had a cousin, Henri - both of whom Joseph collaborated professionally with in later life. Vallot's family were wealthy, having made their fortunes in the dye and textile business, and this allowed him to pursue and fund his many grand scientific undertakings throughout his life. Joseph Vallot received a classical education in Paris, first at the Lycée Charlemagne and then the Sorbonne. He subsequently undertook studies at the Laboratoire de Recherche des Hautes Etudes, the Muséum National d'Histoire Naturelle and at the École Normale Supérieure in Paris. His interests were initially mostly in botany and geology, and he wrote articles on the plants of Africa and of the Pyrenees, publishing many alpine articles after 1886 in the annals of the French Alpine Club, of which he was a member of the Paris section. He later became the vice-president of the Société botanique de France.

Vallot first visited Chamonix around 1877 and became fascinated with the glaciated mountains of the Mont Blanc massif. In 1880, he married the climber and speleologist, Gabrielle Pérou. They had three children: two sons, André and René, and a daughter, Madeleine. She became an alpinist herself; married the painter Paul-Franz Namur and went on to gain a female record for the ascent of Mont Blanc in 1920. Both he and his wife typically wore pith helmets in the mountains.

Vallot's initial interests were to follow his training as a botanist. Between 1881 and 1889 he published a range of botanical articles in various journals. These included monographs on the flora around Fontainebleu; the plants found in the pavements of Paris; the plants of Corsica; the flora of Senegal as well as the vegetation of the Pyrenees. It was to compare the vegetation between the Pyrenees and the Alps that Joseph Vallot came to Chamonix. with the Société géologique de France.

Fascinated by the mountains all around Chamonix, Vallot engaged guides not to only climb Mont Blanc, but also to undertake more difficult routes such as the Aiguille du Dru, even collecting alpine plants at the same time. In 1886 he made two ascents of Mont Blanc, but realised that daily arduous climbs with short stops at the summit were impracticable for serious scientific investigation. At that time it was not known if it were possible for a human to survive a night at such an extreme altitude. So Vallot determined to find out for himself.

== Mont Blanc Observatories ==
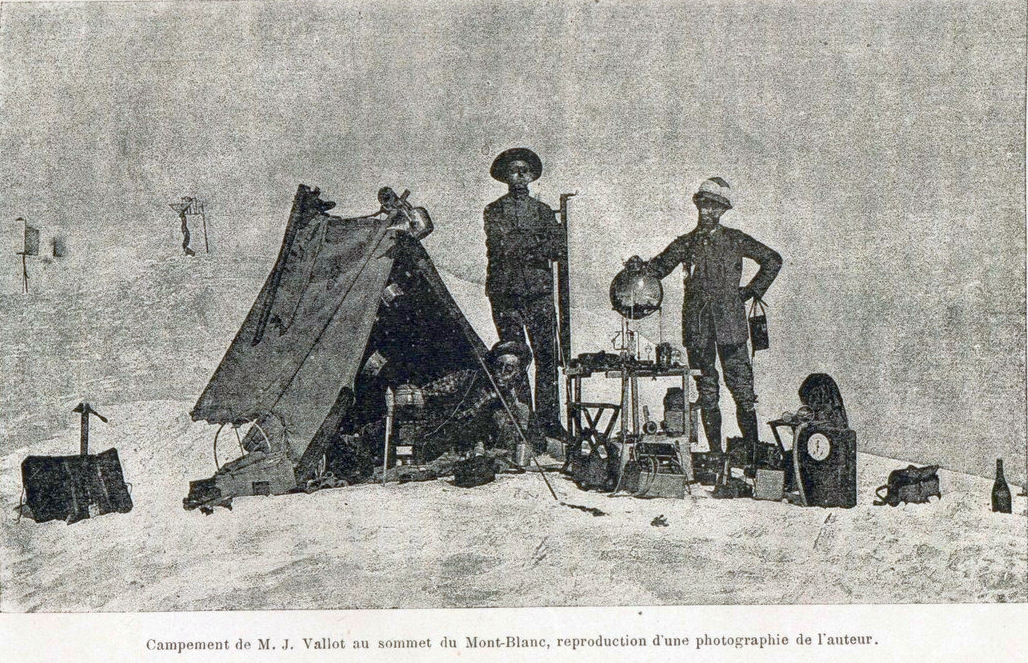
Joseph Vallot (right) on the third day of his encampment on the summit of Mont Blanc in July 1887. Also figured are guides Michel Savioz and Alphonse Payot.

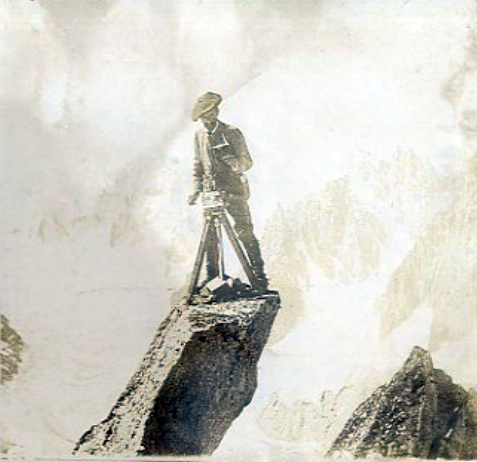
Taking bearings for the preparation of a detailed map of the Mont Blanc massif.

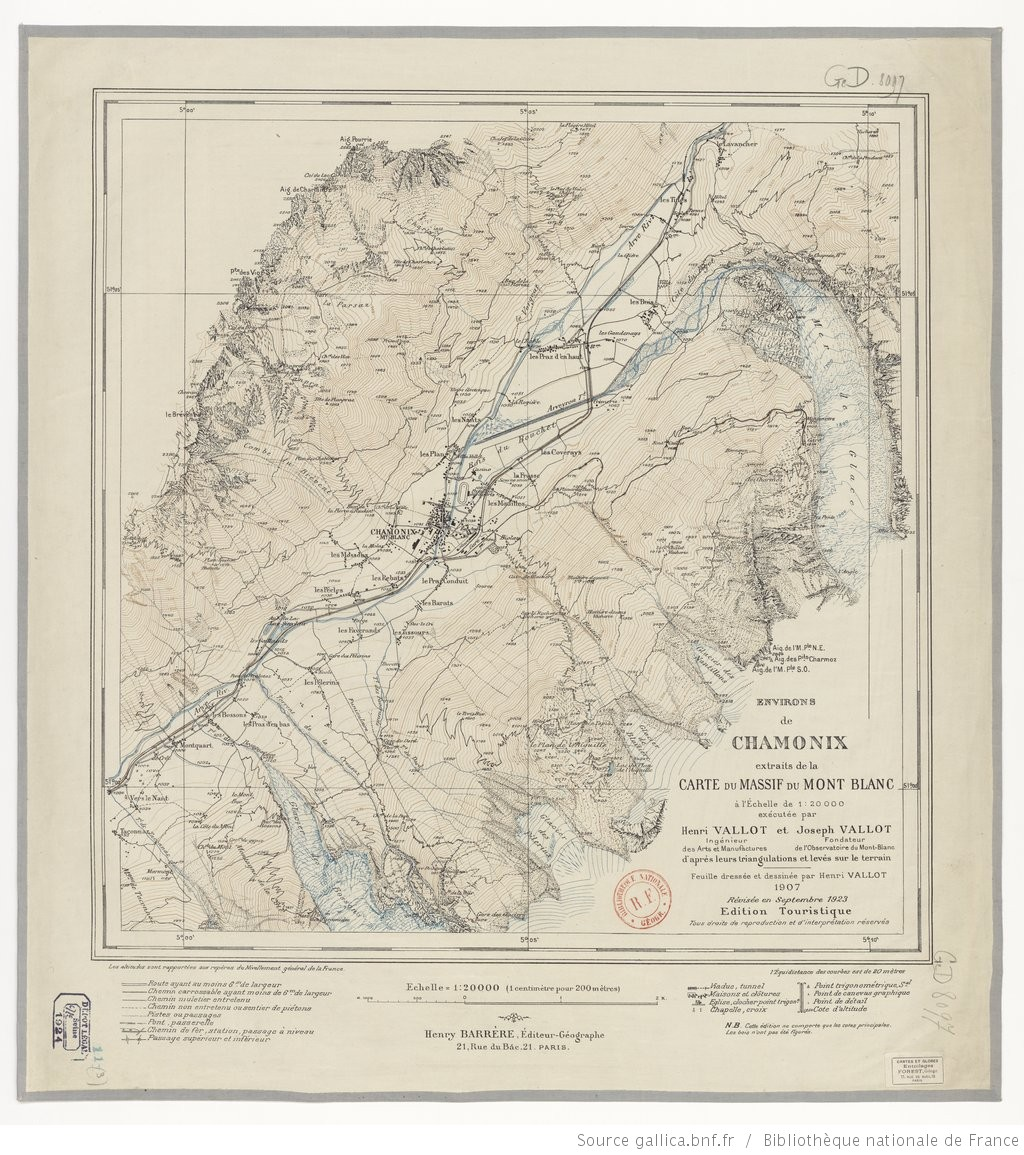
1907 map of the area around Chamonix in the Mont Blanc massif, created by Henri Vallot and Joseph Vallot. Scale: 1:20000

Joseph Vallot has been described as "one of the founding fathers of scientific research on Mont Blanc". He first scaled its summit in 1881 which triggered a life-long fascination with the 4,808-metre-high (15,774 ft) mountain and its surroundings.

He settled in Chamonix and, in 1887, contrived to endure three nights encamped on its summit. Using porters, he transported 250 kilograms (550 lb) of food and equipment to the summit of Mont Blanc. Whilst most returned to the valley, just Vallot, two guides, plus the maker of his scientific equipment, F-M Richard, remained. They faced "great physical strain and constant self-denial" whilst making detailed and simultaneous scientific measurements at three different altitudes. He involved his cousin, the engineer Henri Vallot, who assisted him by taking measurements in the Chamonix valley, with a further set of automated readings being made half way up the mountain in the Grands Mulets Hut, whilst Vallot's group was encamped on Mont Blanc's ice-clad summit. After three days and nights of gruelling work, lack of appetite, and terrible headaches due to the altitude - all the time taking scientific measurements - Vallot and his party returned to Chamonix where they were greeted by a group of flag-waving mountain guides. They received a rapturous welcome from the town's inhabitants who had decorated the town hall, and even erected an arch of flowers. Then, a brass band led them through the streets, and they were met and congratulated on their achievement by the mayor, the municipal council, the chief justice and many others. In his detailed published account of their undertaking and of their return to Chamonix, Vallot commented (in French) that "Astonished and confused by such a triumph, we begin to realise that by going to do scientific research at this altitude we have, without knowing it, achieved a mountaineering feat."

Recognising the impracticalities of doing scientific studies on Mont Blanc without a permanent base, Vallot subsequently engaged his cousin Henri to draw up plans to build a high-altitude observation station which he funded himself. Vallot decided to construct two observatories at different altitudes. His 'Mont Blanc Observatory' was built in Chamonix itself where it served as a base station for invited scientists, whilst the 'Observatoire Vallot' was positioned on a shoulder below Mont Blanc's summit, which enabled comparison of physical measurements made in the valley with those made at high altitude.

In the summer of 1890, and with support from the Commune, Vallot employed 110 porters to carry building materials to construct his observatory on a rocky shoulder below the summit of Mont Blanc. It was positioned on the Rochers des Bosses at a height of 4,358 metres (14,298 ft), but was relocated eight years later to a more suitable point nearby at 4,350 metres (14,270 ft). In 1892 he also arranged for the construction of a separate cabin for climbers who had previously been accommodated in the main observatory building.

Vallot acted as the observatory's director for over 30 years. He and the many scientists he invited to study there made numerous observations across many disciplines, including astronomy, botany, cartography, geology, glaciology, medicine, meteorology and physiology. The results of these researches were published between 1893 and 1917 in seven volumes of the Annales de l'Observatoire du Mont Blanc, as well as in the Comptes Rendus de l'Académie des Sciences.

The first recorded case of pulmonary oedema directly attributable to the effects of high altitude (as documented by an autopsy) occurred in Vallot's observatory in 1891, with the death of a Dr. Jacottet. In 1913, Vallot became the first person to publish research demonstrating the deterioration in physical performance with increasing altitude; he used squirrels as his study animals.

The Observatoire Vallot, covering 60 square metres, included a laboratory, a kitchen and an extravagantly-decorated room known as the 'Chinese Salon'. Vallot elaborately adorned this room with Asian items, including large tapestries, Persian rugs, a Samurai helmet and many exotic ornaments. His observatory and nearby refuge attracted scientists as well as adventurers such as Achille Ratti (the future Pope Pius XI).

Vallot put his knowledge and his own observatory at the disposal of the French astronomer, Pierre Janssen when the latter initiated plans to construct his own observatory on the ice-capped summit of Mont Blanc. Because of his knowledge of glaciers and the movement of ice, Vallot strongly advised against it. The project went ahead nevertheless in 1893, but was only able to operate for a short period of time before the wooden structure began to sink into Mont Blanc's summit ice cap. It was eventually abandoned and dismantled in 1909, and the timber was used as firewood in Vallot's own observatory for many years thereafter.

In 1984, and as part of a plan to upgrade and return the observatory back into active use for high-altitude scientific research, Vallot's Chinese salon was dismantled and reassembled in the Alpine Museum in Chamonix.

== Cartography ==
For some thirty years, Joseph Vallot worked alongside his cousin Henri in the latter's ambitious project to survey and create a new, detailed map of the Mont Blanc massif at a scale of 1:20000. Joseph did the high mountain survey and photography, whilst Henri surveyed at lower altitudes. Only one map was published within their lifetimes. This covered the northern slopes of Mont Blanc down to Chamonix; the remainder of the work was published by Henri's son, Charles. Vallot received a diploma from the Société de Topographie de France for his contribution to his cousin's work.

== Other achievements ==
In the 1890s, Vallot was the first person to make very detailed topographic measurements of the ablation zone of the Mer de Glace - the largest glacier on the Mont Blanc massif and, indeed, in France.

In 1899 he and his cousin, Henri Vallot, lent their formal support to a proposal to construct an underground railway tunnel from the town of Les Houches to just a few hundred metres below the summit of Mont Blanc.

== Honours and awards ==
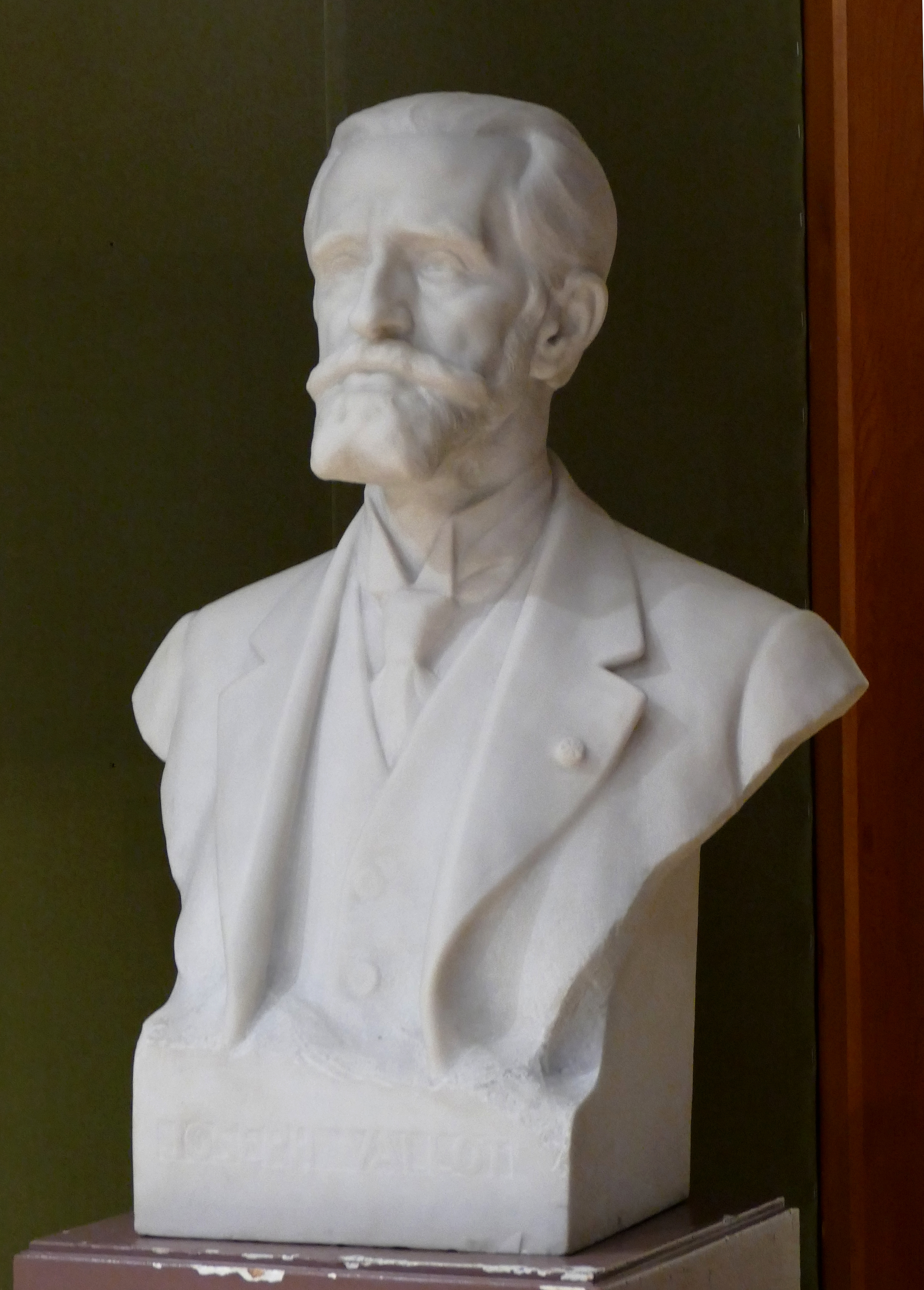
Bust of Joseph Vallot by Henri Coutheillas in the Alpine Museum, Chamonix.

Joseph Vallot's contributions to cartography and to high-altitude science (many made jointly with his wife) led to him receiving many honours and accolades over his lifetime.

In 1895 Vallot was awarded a gold medal from the Société d'Encouragement for his work in establishing the Mont Blanc Observatory.

He was also awarded the 'grand prix des sciences physiques' and the 'prix Wilde' of the French Academy of Sciences. He was a recipient of the Legion of Honour; made a Chevalier of the Ordre des Saints-Maurice-et-Lazare, an officer of the Order of the Medjidie, and an officer of the Order of Saint-Charles of Monaco. In addition, Vallot was a corresponding member of the Bureau des Longitudes and was granted honorary presidency of the French Alpine Club.

Places named in his honour include Avenue Joseph Vallot and Lycée Joseph-Vallot in Lodève, Rue Joseph Vallot, Chamonix, Rue Joseph Vallot and Avenue Joseph Vallot, Nice.

== Later life ==
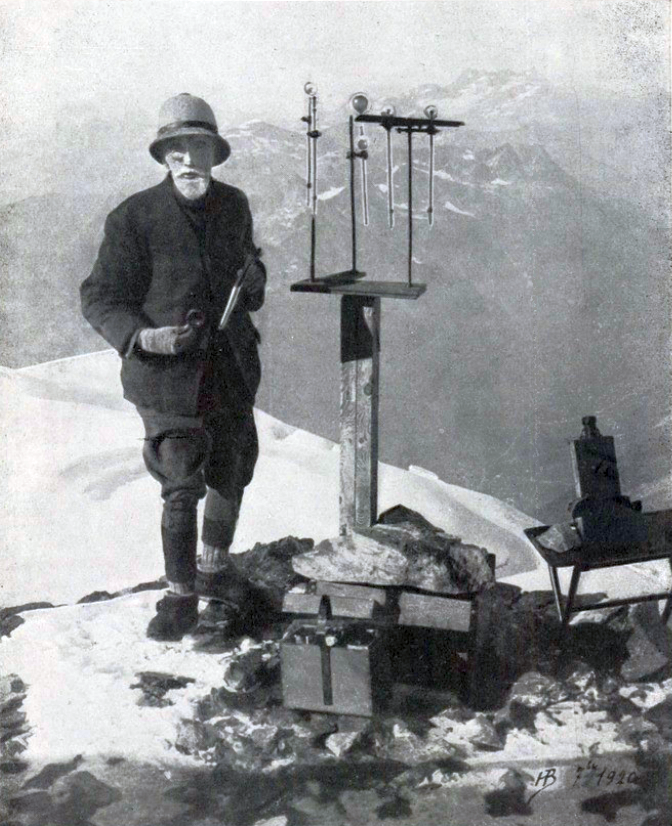
Joseph Vallot in 1920 on his final visit to the observatory he built.

From 1905 onwards, with his health deteriorating from the many long stays at high altitudes, Joseph Vallot started to spend his winter months in Nice. The climate was more favourable for him there, though he was no less active. In Nice, he built a weather station to enable him to study the region's weather, and he also continued with his botanical interests. According to the website of the Alpine Museum in Chamonix, Vallot collected some 200,000 herbarium specimens which were donated to the Nice museum.

In 1907, Vallot, who had partnered with the cinematographer, Léon Gaumont, was involved in the production of a 9.5mm film documenting the climbing of Mont Blanc.

In September 1920, at the age of 66, Vallot made his last climb to stay and to make scientific measurements in his high-altitude observatory. From there he also made his 34th and final ascent to the summit of Mont Blanc.

When his health started to deteriorate further, Vallot left Chamonix and moved to his villa in Nice where, after a long illness, he eventually died on 11 April 1925. His body is interred at Père Lachaise Cemetery in Paris. In his will, Vallot left his observatory to the French nation and it has since been utilised by the Paris Observatory, the French National Centre for Scientific Research (CNRS) and, more recently, the Research Center for Alpine Ecosystems (CREA Mont-Blanc).

== Selected publications ==
- Vallot (1882) Etudes Sur La Flore Du Sénégal.
- Vallot (1883) Etudes Sur La Flore Du Sénégal.
- Vallot (1884) Essai sur la flore du pavé de Paris.
- Vallot (1887) Trois jours au Mont Blanc: Cinq ascensions au sommet.
- Vallot J (1900) Annales de l’observatoire météorologique, physique et glaciaire du Mont Blanc. Vol 4.
- Vallot J (1905) Annales de l'Observatoire météorologique, physique et glaciaire du Mont Blanc. Vol 6.
- Vallot, H. & Vallot, J. (1907) Carte du Massif du Mont Blanc.

== See also ==
- Tête Rousse Glacier
- Vallot Glacier
- Venance Payot
- Legion of Honour
- List of Legion of Honour recipients by name (V)
- List of foreign recipients of the Legion of Honour by country
- Legion of Honour Museum
