= Gustave Ravier =

French politician

- Born: 9 November 1850; Cosne-Cours-sur-Loire, Nièvre, Burgundy France
- Died: 12 April 1918 (aged 67); Savigny-en-Sancerre, Cher, Centre-Val de Loire, France
- Occupation: Politician

Gustave Ravier (9 November 1850 – 12 April 1918) was a French politician.

== Early life ==
Gustave Ravier was born on 9 November 1850 in Cosne-Cours-sur-Loire, France.

== Career ==
He served as a member of the Chamber of Deputies from 1906 to 1910.

== Death ==
He died on 12 April 1918 in Savigny-en-Sancerre, France.
