= Noah Ernest Dorsey =

American physicist (1873–1959)

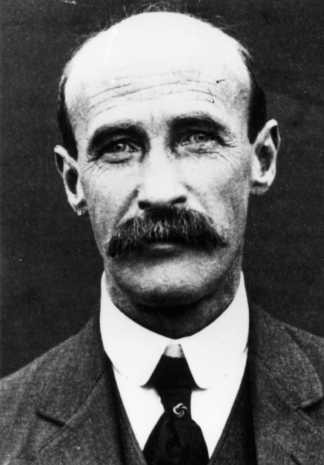
- Born: March 15, 1873; Annapolis Junction, Maryland
- Died: June 6, 1959 (aged 86); Towson, Maryland
- Education: Johns Hopkins University
- Known for: Establishing standards for radioactivity and x-ray measurements
- Scientific career
- Fields: Physics
- Workplaces: National Bureau of Standards

Noah Ernest Dorsey (March 15, 1873 – July 6, 1959) was an American physicist, known for his contributions to measurement technology.

== Background ==
Dorsey was born in Annapolis Junction, Maryland and studied at Johns Hopkins University where he obtained a B.A. (1893) and a Ph.D. (1897). He worked at the same place a few years, was with U. S. Bureau of Soils and the Department of Agriculture as well, before he eventually joined National Bureau of Standards (1903) where he stayed until retirement in 1943. His research was on standards of radioactivity and x-ray measurements (1914–22), becoming the leader of the Radium Section (1921) and publishing a widely used book covering this emerging field, including specifications of his own bodily injuries from interactions with radium and radon.

Dorsey died in Towson, Maryland on July 6, 1959 at the age of 86.

== Selected works ==
- Dorsey, Noah Ernest (1921). Physics of Radioactivity: The Text of a Correspondence Course Prepared Especially for the Medical Profession. Williams & Wilkins.
- Dorsey, Noah Ernest (1948). The Freezing of Supercooled Water. American Philosophical Society. ISBN 978-0-87169-383-9.
- Dorsey, Noah Ernest (1940). Properties of Ordinary Water-substance in All Its Phases: Water Vapor, Water, and All the Ices. American Chemical Society. ISBN 978-0-8412-0255-9.
- Rosa, Edward Bennett; Dorsey, Noah Ernest; Miller, John Milton (1913). A Determination of the International Ampere in Absolute Measure. U.S. Department of Commerce and Labor, Bureau of Standards.
- Rosa, Edward Bennett; Dorsey, Noah Ernest (1907). A Comparison of the Various Methods of Determining the Ratio of the Electromagnetic to the Electrostatic Unit of Electricity. U.S. Department of Commerce and Labor, Bureau of Standards.
- Dorsey, Noah Ernest (1926). Measurement of Surface Tension. U.S. Government Printing Office.
- Dorsey, Noah Ernest (1926). Measurement of Surface Tension. U.S. Government Printing Office.
