= Graver =

Graver may refer to:

- Burin (engraving) (French burin, "cold chisel"), a tool used in the art of engraving
- Graver (surname), an older English name, still common
- Graver basis
- a neologism derived from "goth" and "raver", primarily used as an alternative term for Cybergoth
