= Gunnel Channel =

Gunnel Channel (67°6′S 67°33′W) is a channel, 0.5 nautical miles (1 km) wide and 7 nautical miles (13 km) long, situated in the south part of Hanusse Bay and separating Hansen Island from the west coast of Graham Land, Antarctica. It was first observed from the air and roughly charted in 1936 by the British Graham Land Expedition under John Rymill. It was surveyed from the ground in 1948 by the Falkland Islands Dependencies Survey which gave this descriptive name. The channel gives a false impression of such narrowness that a boat could not navigate it without scraping her "gunnels" (gunwales) on either side.
