= Gabrielle Vallot =

French speleologist, climber

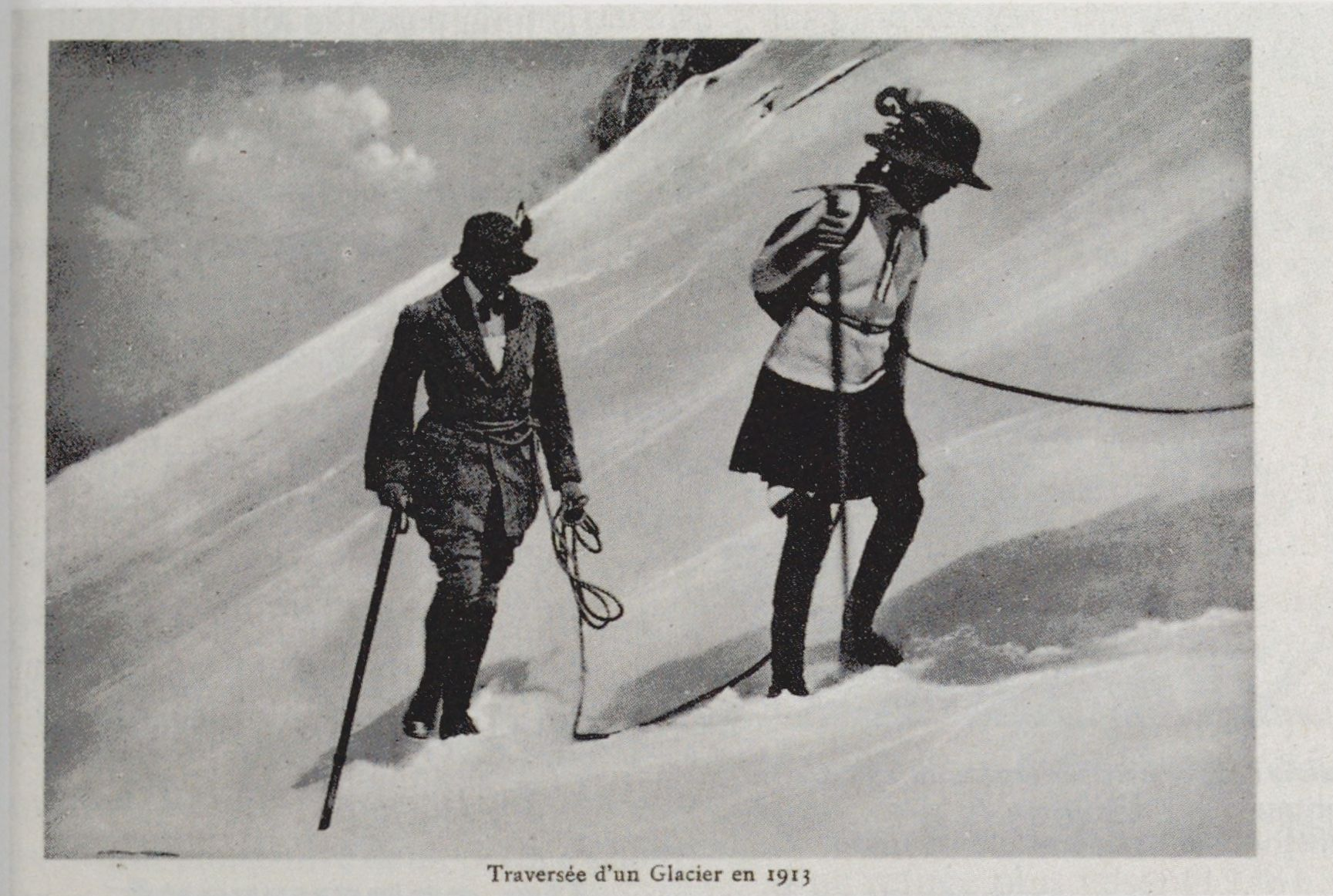
Gabrielle Vallot and daughter, Madeleine Vallot

Gabrielle Vallot (born Claire-Marie-Gabrielle Pérou on November 18, 1856, in Paris - February 21, 1933, in Paris) was a French climber, mountaineer, and speleologist. She married scientist and mountaineer Joseph Vallot in 1880, and they climbed Mont-Blanc together.

== Biography ==
Claire-Marie-Gabrielle Pérou was born on November 18, 1856, in Paris's former 2nd arrondissement.

She would be one of the first women to have published writings on speleology, following excursions in her region, near Lodève. Her husband, the speleologist Joseph Vallot helped her with the realization of the plans and topographies. The couple had a daughter, Madeleine Vallot, who went on to become a renowned mountaineer in her own right, holding several records.

Pérou divorced Vallot in 1912. She died in her home located at 22 rue de Chazelles in Paris's 17th arrondissement on February 21, 1933.

== Bibliography ==
- "Mes ascensions" [My Ascensions], Annuaire du Club alpin français [Yearbook of the French Alpine Club], 1887, pp. 41–47.
- "Grottes et abîmes," [Caves and Abysses] Annuaire du Club alpin français, 1889, pp. 145–69.
- "Les grandes figures disparues de la spéléologie française", Spelunca (Spécial Centenaire de la Spéléologie), no. 31, juillet-septembre 1988, p. 84
