= Zinc D-Ala-D-Ala carboxypeptidase =

Identifiers
- EC no.: 3.4.17.14
- CAS no.: 213189-85-6

Databases
- IntEnz: IntEnz view
- BRENDA: BRENDA entry
- ExPASy: NiceZyme view
- KEGG: KEGG entry
- MetaCyc: metabolic pathway
- PRIAM: profile
- PDB structures: RCSB PDB PDBe PDBsum
Search
- PMC: articles
- PubMed: articles
- NCBI: proteins

Zinc D-Ala-D-Ala carboxypeptidase (EC 3.4.17.14, Zn^{2+} G peptidase, D-alanyl-D-alanine hydrolase, D-alanyl-D-alanine-cleaving carboxypeptidase, DD-carboxypeptidase, G enzyme, DD-carboxypeptidase-transpeptidase) is an enzyme. This enzyme catalyses the following chemical reaction

Cleavage of the bond: (Ac)2-L-lysyl-D-alanyl--D-alanine

This is a zinc enzyme. Catalyses carboxypeptidation but not transpeptidation reactions involved in bacterial cell wall metabolism.
