= Hendrik Edelman =

Dutch-American librarian, scholar, and publisher

Hendrik Edelman is a Dutch-American librarian, scholar, and publisher known for his contributions to academic librarianship, collection development, and the history of scholarly publishing. He is Professor Emeritus at the School of Communication and Information at Rutgers University, New Brunswick, New Jersey. He has published extensively on library collection management, scholarly communication, and Dutch-American studies. He has received the New Jersey Library Association Distinguished Service Award.

== Early life and education ==
Edelman was born in 1937 in Wageningen, the Netherlands. He attended the Wagenings Lyceum, where he earned his Diploma A in 1958. In 1966 he received the Diploma Uitgeverij of the Koninklijke Vereniging van het Boekenvak (KVB) Amsterdam. After he moved to the United States in 1967, he obtained a Master of Library Science (MLS) from George Peabody College (now part of Vanderbilt University) in Nashville, Tennessee, in 1969.

== Career ==
From 1958 to 1965, he worked as a bookseller at Martinus Nijhoff. In that capacity, he made four extensive sales trips, visiting U.S. and Canadian research libraries. He later held a position as Sales Manager at D. Reidel Publishing Company (1965–1967).

His academic library career began at Vanderbilt University, where he served as University Bibliographer at the Joint University Libraries from 1967 to 1969. He then joined Cornell University Libraries as Assistant Director for Collection Development, a position he held for a decade (1969–1979). In 1979, Edelman became University Librarian at Rutgers University, serving until 1985, when he transitioned to the faculty as a Professor in the Department of Library and Information Science at Rutgers.

After retiring from Rutgers in 2002, Edelman continued teaching as an Adjunct Professor at the Palmer School of Library and Information Science at Long Island University until 2006, where he taught a graduate seminar on the history of the book in America.

== Consulting and professional activities ==
Throughout his career, Edelman has served as a consultant on library collection management and evaluation for institutions worldwide, including the University of Chile, University of Suriname, New-York Historical Society, and the Historical Society of Pennsylvania.

== Publications ==
- International Publishing in the Netherlands, 1933–1945: German Exile, Scholarly Expansion, War-Time Clandestinity (2010)
- The Netherland-America Foundation, 1921–2011: A History (2012)
- The Dutch Language Press in America: Two Centuries of Printing, Publishing, and Bookselling (1986)
- Numerous articles in Quaerendo, Logos: The Journal of the World Book Community, and the Journal of the Rutgers University Libraries

== Awards and honors ==
- New Jersey Library Association Distinguished Service Award (1983)
- American Library Association Resources Section Award (1976)
- Recognition in Who's Who in America (1980–present)
