= Nye Glacier =

Glacier in Antarctica

Nye Glacier (67°28′S 67°31′W) is a glacier on Arrowsmith Peninsula flowing southwest to Whistling Bay, in Graham Land. Mapped by Falkland Islands Dependencies Survey (FIDS) from surveys and air photos, 1948–59. It was named by the United Kingdom Antarctic Place-Names Committee (UK-APC) for John F. Nye, an English physicist who has made theoretical contributions to the study of the flow of glaciers and ice sheets.
