= Mount Rendu =

Mountain in Graham Land, Antarctica

Highest point
- Elevation: 2,250 m (7,380 ft)
- Prominence: 1,980 m (6,500 ft)
- Listing: Ultra, Ribu

Mount Rendu (67°26′S 67°4′W) is a mountain between Reid Glacier and Heim Glacier on Arrowsmith Peninsula in Graham Land. Mapped by Falkland Islands Dependencies Survey (FIDS) from surveys and air photos, 1948–59. Named by United Kingdom Antarctic Place-Names Committee (UK-APC) for Louis Rendu (1789–1859), French Bishop and scientist, author of Theorie des glaciers de la Savoie, an important book on the mechanism of glacier flow.

Bauer Buttress is a projecting rock buttress on the northeast side of Mount Rendu. It was named by UK-APC following geological work by the British Antarctic Survey, 1980–81, after Albert Bauer, French engineer and glaciologist.
