= Lewis Peaks =

Mountain in Antarctica

The Lewis Peaks (67°15′S 67°30′W) are two prominent peaks, 1,065 metres (3,500 ft) high, standing 3 nautical miles (6 km) east of Day Island and surmounting the western part of Arrowsmith Peninsula on the west coast of Graham Land, Antarctica. They were first roughly surveyed in 1909 by the French Antarctic Expedition under Jean-Baptiste Charcot. They were resurveyed in 1948 by the Falkland Islands Dependencies Survey who named then for Flight Lieutenant John Lewis, pilot of the Auster airplane which was used from the RRS John Biscoe for reconnaissance of ice conditions in Marguerite Bay in February 1950.
