= Remigius Ritzler =

20th-century Roman Catholic priest

Most Reverend Remigius Ritzler
- Native name: Ludwig Ritzler
- Church: Catholic Church

Personal details
- Born: 25 September 1909 Diedesfeld, Palatinate
- Died: 2 December 1993 (aged 84) Ruhpolding, Oberbayern

Remigius Ritzler, O.F.M. Conv. (25 September 1909 – 2 December 1993) was a German Roman Catholic priest who continued the work on the Hierarchia Catholica Medii Aevi begun by Konrad Eubel (1842–1923), a compilation of all the cardinals and the bishops of the Latin Church since 1198 organized according to diocese or titular church.
