= Vallot Glacier =

Glacier in Graham Land, Antarctica

Vallot Glacier (67°18′S 67°30′W) is a glacier flowing northwest to Laubeuf Fjord close south of Lewis Peaks, on Arrowsmith Peninsula in Graham Land. It was mapped by the Falkland Islands Dependencies Survey (FIDS) from surveys and air photos, 1948–59, and was named by the United Kingdom Antarctic Place-Names Committee (UK-APC) for Joseph Vallot, a French naturalist and glaciologist who first measured the surface velocity of a glacier over a long period, in Switzerland, 1891–99.
