= Vallot Hut =

Refuge in the Mont Blanc massif

Coordinates: 45°50′22″N 6°51′07″E

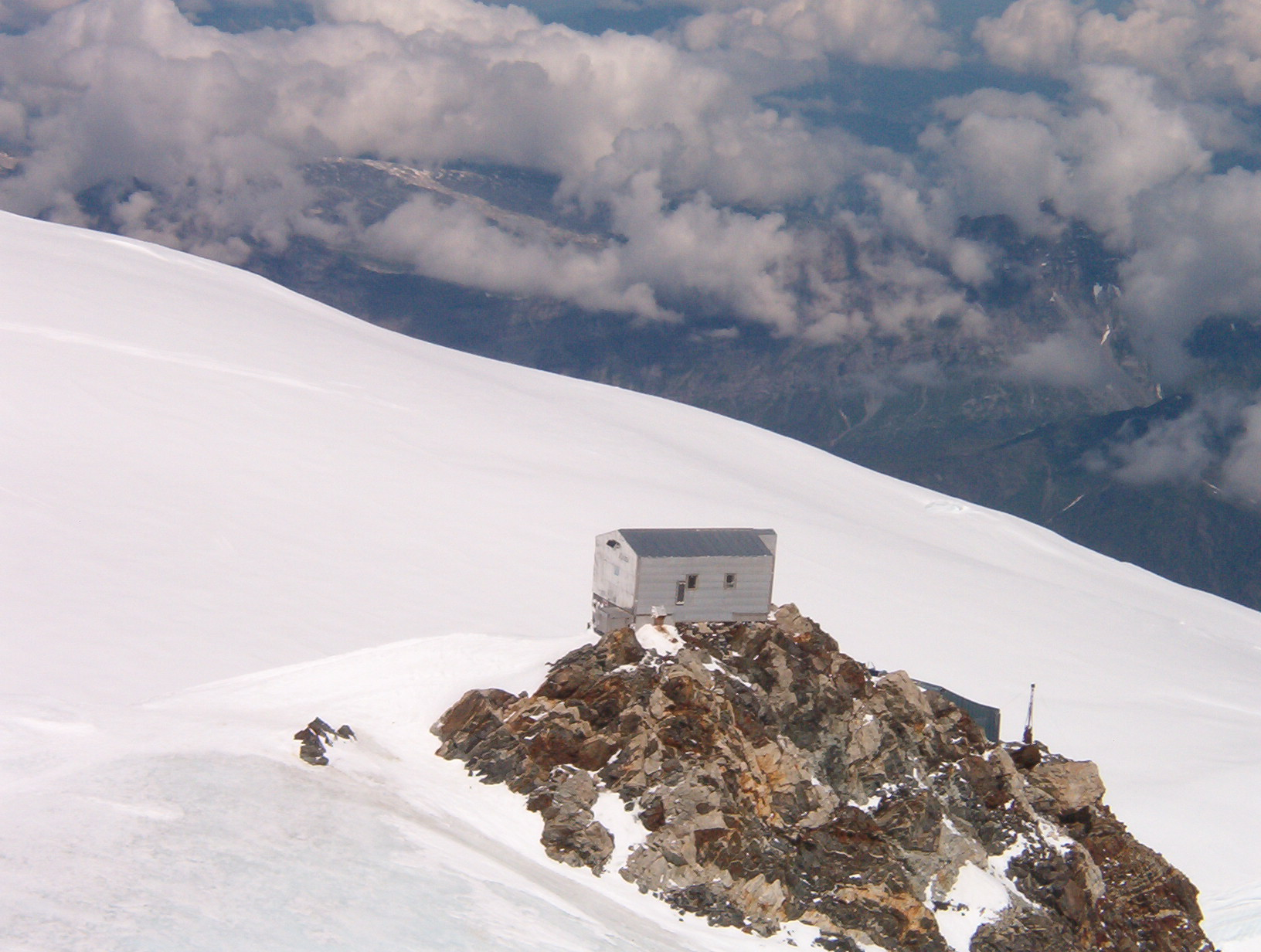
Vallot Hut

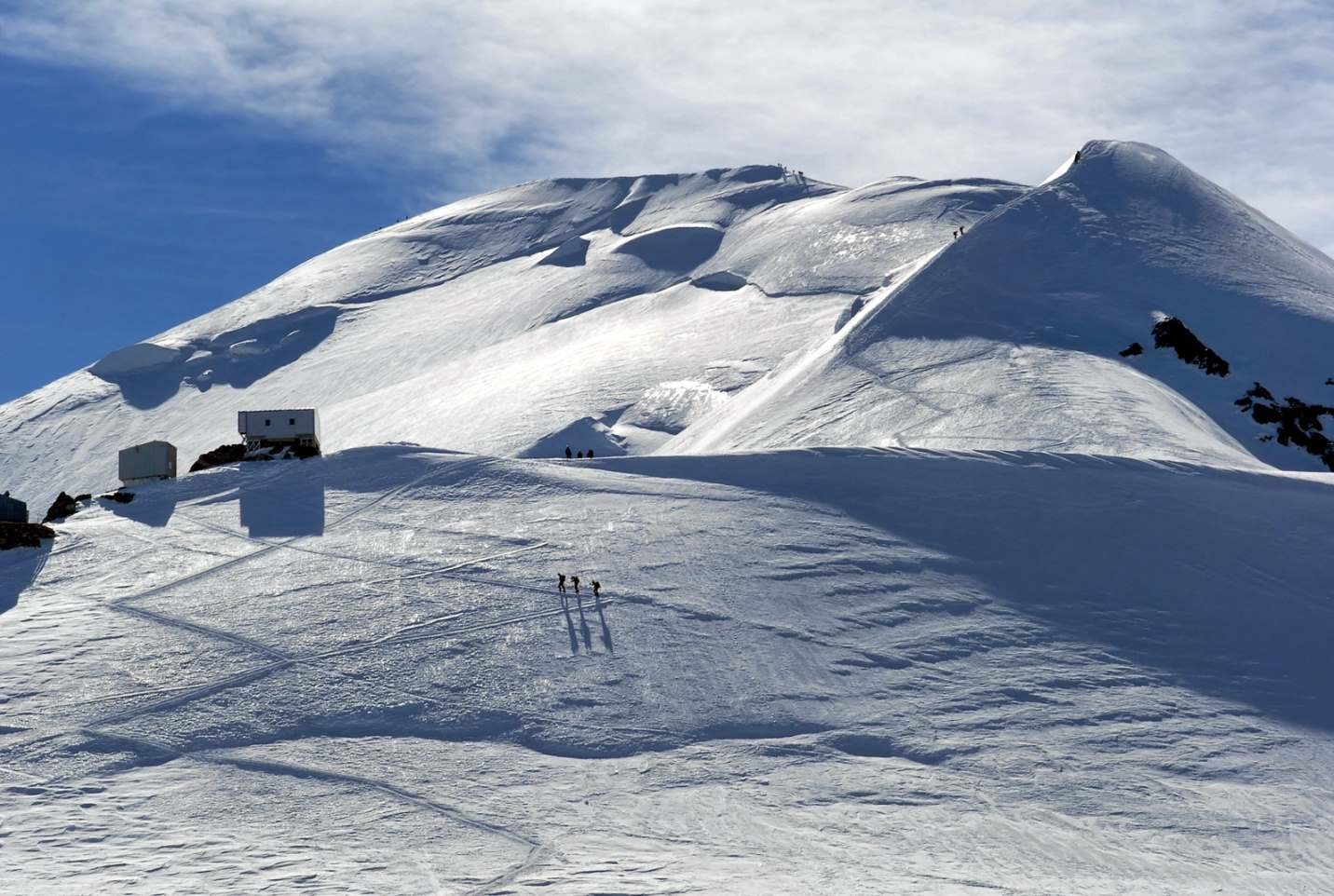
Vallot Refuge and Mont Blanc summit, with the Bosses Ridge

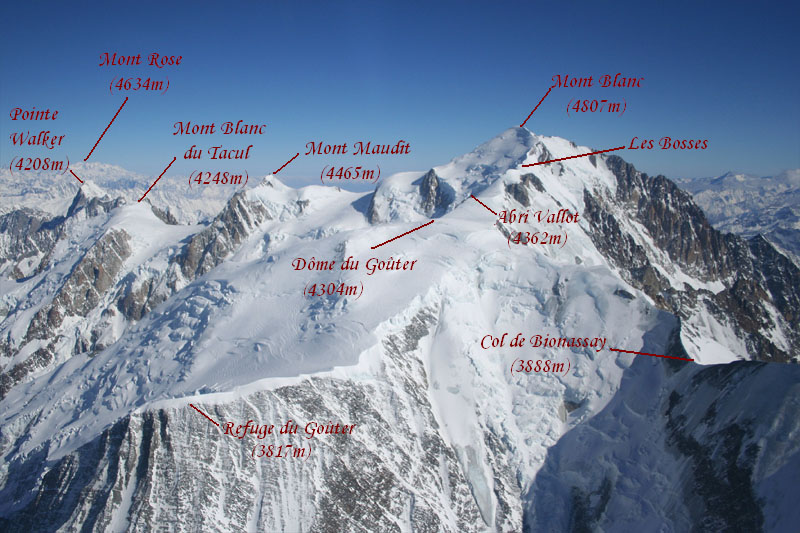
Aerial photo showing location of Vallot Hut below Mont Blanc

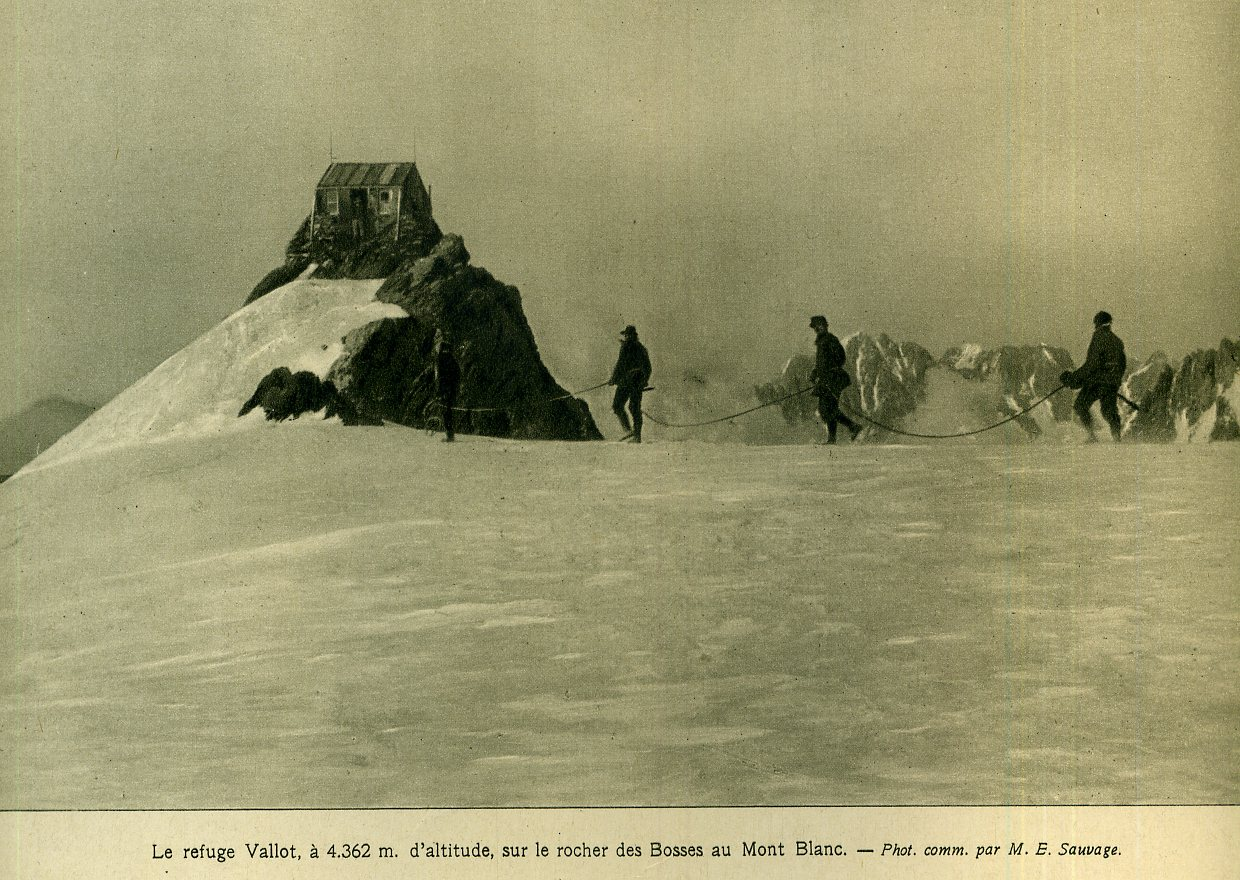
Vallot Hut in 1924

The Vallot Hut (French: Refuge Vallot) is a refuge in the Mont Blanc massif on the upper slopes of Mont Blanc in the Alps. It is located below the Bosses Ridge between the Dome du Gouter and Mont Blanc summit, at an altitude of 4,362 metres. Intended only as an emergency shelter, and not as a base for ascending Mont Blanc, this unheated duralumin box was designed to accommodate up to 12 people, but often contains considerably more.
