= Charles Joseph Gravier =

French zoologist (1865–1937)

- Born: March 4, 1865; Orléans, France
- Died: November 15, 1937 (aged 72); Paris, France
- Education: École normale supérieure de Saint-Cloud
- Known for: Research on Anthozoa (sea anemones and corals)
- Awards: Commander of the Legion of Honour (1937)
- Scientific career
- Fields: Zoology, marine biology
- Workplaces: Muséum national d'histoire naturelle

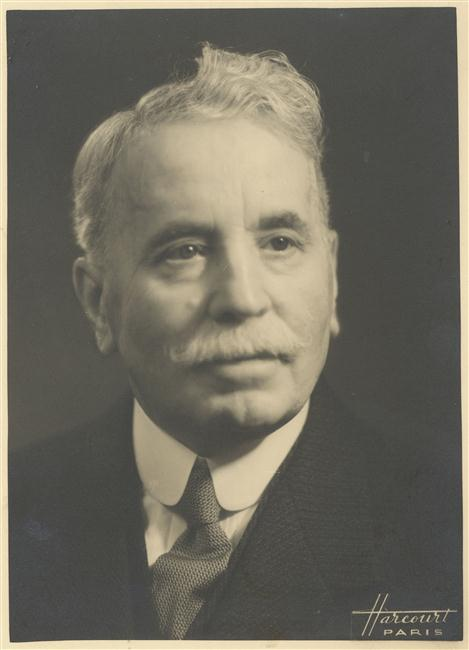
Charles Joseph Gravier

Charles Joseph Gravier (4 March 1865, in Orléans – 15 November 1937, in Paris) was a French zoologist.

He initially taught classes at École normale (1883–85) in Orléans and at the École normale supérieure de Saint-Cloud, afterwards becoming a professor of natural history at the École normale (1887) in Grenoble. In 1893 he obtained his aggregation of natural sciences and in 1896 his PhD in sciences. Later he became first assistant to Edmond Perrier (1844–1921) at the Muséum national d'histoire naturelle in Paris, where from 1903 he served as an assistant to Louis Joubin (1861–1935). In 1917 he attained the chair of zoology (worms and crustaceans) at the museum.

Gravier is known for his research of Anthozoa (class containing sea anemones and corals). The genera Gravieria, Gravierella and Gravieropsammia are named after him, as are numerous marine species, including the Red Sea mimic blenny (Ecsenius gravieri).

In 1923 he was made a chevalier of the Légion d'honneur and commander on 6 August 1937.

== Partial list of written works ==
- Annélides polychétes, (1906) – annelid polychaetes.
- Crustacés parasites, (1913)
- Alcyonaire, (1914) – On Alcyonaria
- Larves d'Actiniaires provenant des campagnes scientifiques de S.A.S. le Prince Albert Ier de Monaco, (1920) – Actiniaria larvae from the scientific campaigns of S.A.S. Prince Albert I of Monaco.
- Madréporaires provenant des campagnes des yachts "Princesse-Alice" et "Hirondelle II" (1893–1913), (1920) – Madreporaria from the campaigns of the yachts Princesse-Alice and Hirondelle II (1893–1913).
- Antipathaires provenant des campagnes des yachts "Princesse-Alice" et "Hirondelle II" (1893–1913), (1921) – Antipatharia from the campaigns of the yachts Princesse-Alice and Hirondelle II (1893–1913).
- Hexactinidés provenant des campagnes des yachts "Princesse-Alice" et "Hirondelle II" (1893–1913), (1922) – Hexactinellid sponges from the campaigns of the yachts Princesse-Alice and Hirondelle II (1893–1913).
  - Works by Gravier that have been translated into English:
- "Some madreporarian corals from French Somaliland, East Africa, collected by Dr. Charles Gravier" by Thomas Wayland Vaughan, (1907).
