= Muramoylpentapeptide carboxypeptidase =

Identifiers
- EC no.: 3.4.17.8
- CAS no.: 9077-67-2

Databases
- IntEnz: IntEnz view
- BRENDA: BRENDA entry
- ExPASy: NiceZyme view
- KEGG: KEGG entry
- MetaCyc: metabolic pathway
- PRIAM: profile
- PDB structures: RCSB PDB PDBe PDBsum
Search
- PMC: articles
- PubMed: articles
- NCBI: proteins

Muramoylpentapeptide carboxypeptidase (EC 3.4.17.8, D-alanine carboxypeptidase I, DD-carboxypeptidase, D-alanine carboxypeptidase, D-alanyl-D-alanine carboxypeptidase, D-alanine-D-alanine-carboxypeptidase, carboxypeptidase D-alanyl-D-alanine, carboxypeptidase I, UDP-N-acetylmuramoyl-tetrapeptidyl-D-alanine alanine-hydrolase, D-alanyl-D-alanine peptidase, DD-peptidase, penicillin binding protein 5, PBP5, PdcA, VanY) is an enzyme. This enzyme catalyses the following chemical reaction.

Cleavage of the bond UDP-N-acetylmuramoyl-L-alanyl-D-gamma-glutamyl-6-carboxy-L-lysyl-D-alanyl--D-alanine

This bacterial enzyme that requires a divalent cation for activity.
