= Amsterdam University College =

Educational institution in the Netherlands

Amsterdam University College (AUC)
- Type: Undergraduate, Liberal Arts and Sciences
- Established: 2008
- Affiliations: University of Amsterdam & VU University
- Dean: Prof. Dr. Bruce Mutsvairo (Interim)
- Academic staff: ~ 150
- Administrative staff: ~ 35
- Students: ~ 900
- Location: Science Park 113, 1098XG, Amsterdam, Netherlands; 52.3554°N 4.9518°E
- Campus: Urban
- Website: www.auc.nl

Amsterdam University College is a Liberal Arts and Sciences Bachelor's programme that is a joint initiative of the University of Amsterdam and Vrije Universiteit Amsterdam. AUC is a Honours programme at the Bachelor's level. Students live and study together on an international campus located in Amsterdam Science Park. The programme is small-scale, selective, and open to Dutch and international students.

The programme was founded in 2008 with a particular focus on the sciences. Although AUC has its own building for classes, students can also use facilities of both parent universities. AUC offers Bachelor of Arts (BA) degrees for Social Science and Humanities majors, and Bachelor of Science (BSc) degrees for Science majors. The curriculum is multidisciplinary and interdisciplinary.

== History ==
The foundation of AUC goes back to an initiative of the two large universities in Amsterdam, University of Amsterdam (UvA) and Vrije Universiteit Amsterdam (VU), as well as the municipality. It is part of an initiative to make Amsterdam a hub for research and development in the natural sciences.

AUC was officially founded in 2008, and took up operation with its founding class in 2009. The first dean of the college was Prof. Dr. Marijk van der Wende. The first class of graduates received their diplomas in 2012. In 2016, van der Wende was succeeded as AUC dean by Prof. Murray Pratt.

== Academics ==
=== Reputation ===
In the 2016 Keuzegids Universiteiten, AUC earned a designation as top-rated programme based on student ratings and evaluations by the Accreditation Organisation of the Netherlands and Flanders (NVAO). In the 2015 Nationale Studentenquête, AUC received a high rating of 4.3 out of 5, placing it among the best programmes at the University of Amsterdam and in the country.

Students at Amsterdam University College receive a joint degree from the University of Amsterdam and the VU University. The UvA regularly ranks among the best 100 universities in the world (2024/25 QS World University Rankings: 55).

=== Academic programme ===
AUC offers a three-year honours degree in three broad majors: Science, Social Science, and Humanities. During the academic year 2024/25, students could choose between approximately 245 courses. As part of AUC's academic orientation, students pursue an 'Academic Core' that involves courses in writing, global identity, and Logic. In addition to the 'Academic Core', the students pursue 'fields of study' within their major, along with two courses each in the majors outside of their own. AUC offers courses in 24 fields of study like Health, Psychology, Earth and Environment, Sustainability, International Relations, and Philosophy.

While teachers for many core and introductory courses are employed by AUC directly, the college draws on its parent institutions for many of its lecturers. It is also possible to do a semester abroad at a partner university of AUC, UvA, or VU.

Graduates receive a joint degree from the University of Amsterdam and Vrije University; a Bachelor of Arts in Liberal Arts and Sciences (as a Social Sciences or Humanities major) or a Bachelor of Science in Liberal Arts and Sciences (as a Science major). Cum laude degrees are awarded for graduation with a grade of 8 or higher, and summa cum laude degrees for a 8.75 or higher.

=== Admissions ===
AUC aims to admit approximately 300 students annually, with around 50% pursuing Science major. The college welcomes applications from both Dutch and international backgrounds. The number of applications fluctuates each year, averaging around 1,400.

AUC is distinctive in the Dutch higher education landscape for its selective admissions process. Applicants are assessed based on their English proficiency, mathematics skills, and GPA, with the college targeting students within the top 30% of their grade distribution. Admissions decisions are based on the information provided in the application form and are evaluated using the "two pairs of eyes" principle to ensure a fair and impartial selection process.

== Tuition and scholarships ==
As of the academic year of 2024/25, the tuition fee amounted to 4,940 Euro for Dutch and EU/EEA students and 13,790 Euro for all other international students.

=== Scholarship fund ===
About 8% of students are supported by the AUC scholarship fund (ASF). The fund awards scholarships of 4,000 Euro for Dutch as well as international students and 26,000 Euro for international (Non-EEA) students. In addition, the Talent Fellowship Programme of the AUC scholarship fund provides scholarships specifically for Dutch minority students, with the aim to increase the diversity of the student body.

The AUC Scholarship Fund is supported by VU, UvA, and the Amsterdam University College Student Association; as well as a range of corporate sponsors.

== Accreditation ==
The AUC programme is a fully accredited joint bachelor programme of the VU University Amsterdam and the University of Amsterdam (UvA). The Dutch government allocates responsibility for accreditation to the NVAO (the Accreditation Organisation of the Netherlands and Flanders). The AUC programme was accredited by the NVAO on 2 September 2008. Upon successful completion of the programme students receive a joint Bachelor honours degree from the VU University Amsterdam and University of Amsterdam (UvA) and the title Bachelor of Arts (BA) or Bachelor of Science (BSc).

AUC has been awarded the "Distinctive feature of small-scale and intensive education" by the Dutch-Flemish Accreditation Council (NVAO), which is required from Dutch institutes of higher education for raising tuition fees beyond the national standard.

== Campus and location ==
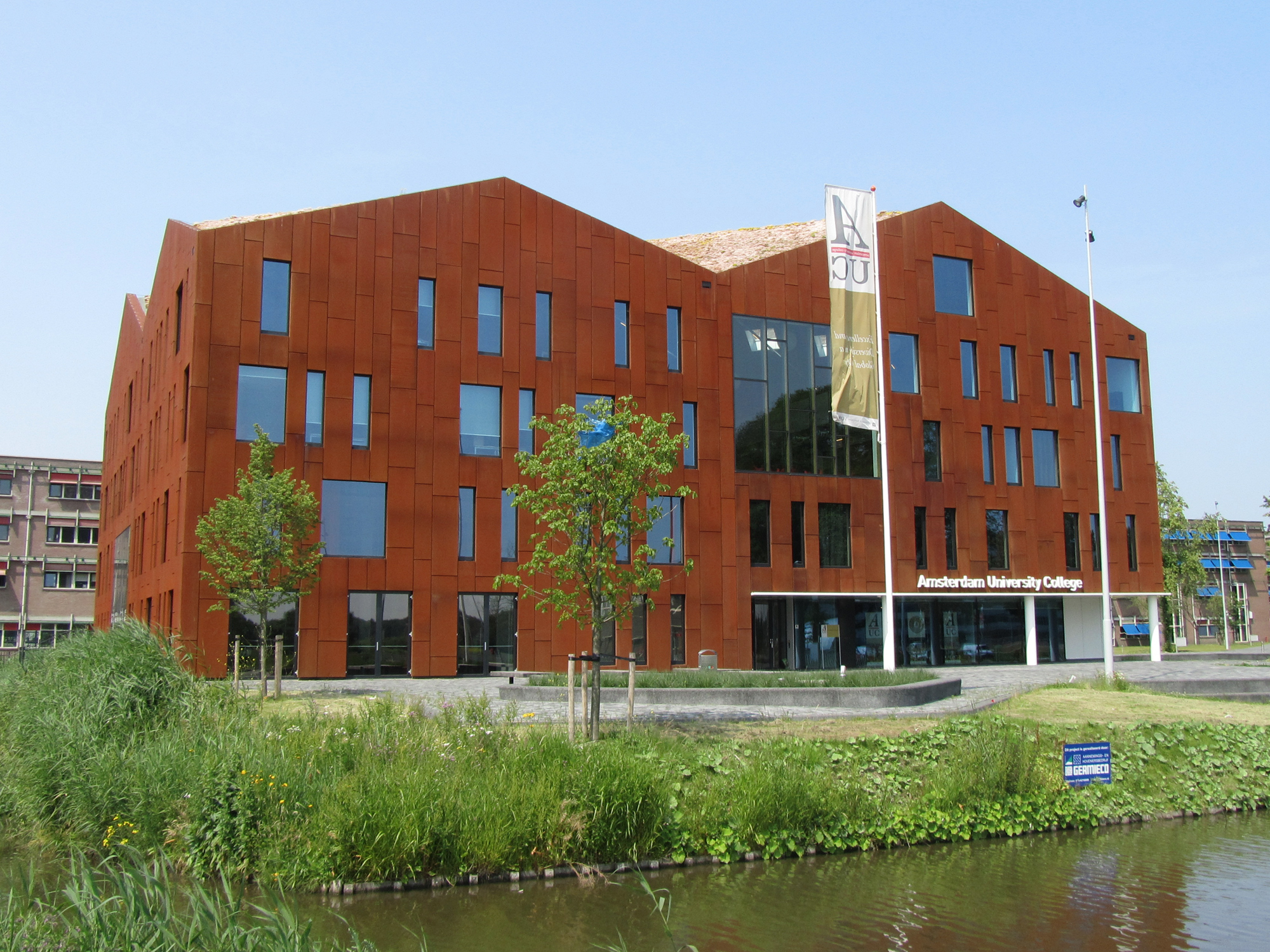
The AUC building at Amsterdam Science Park.

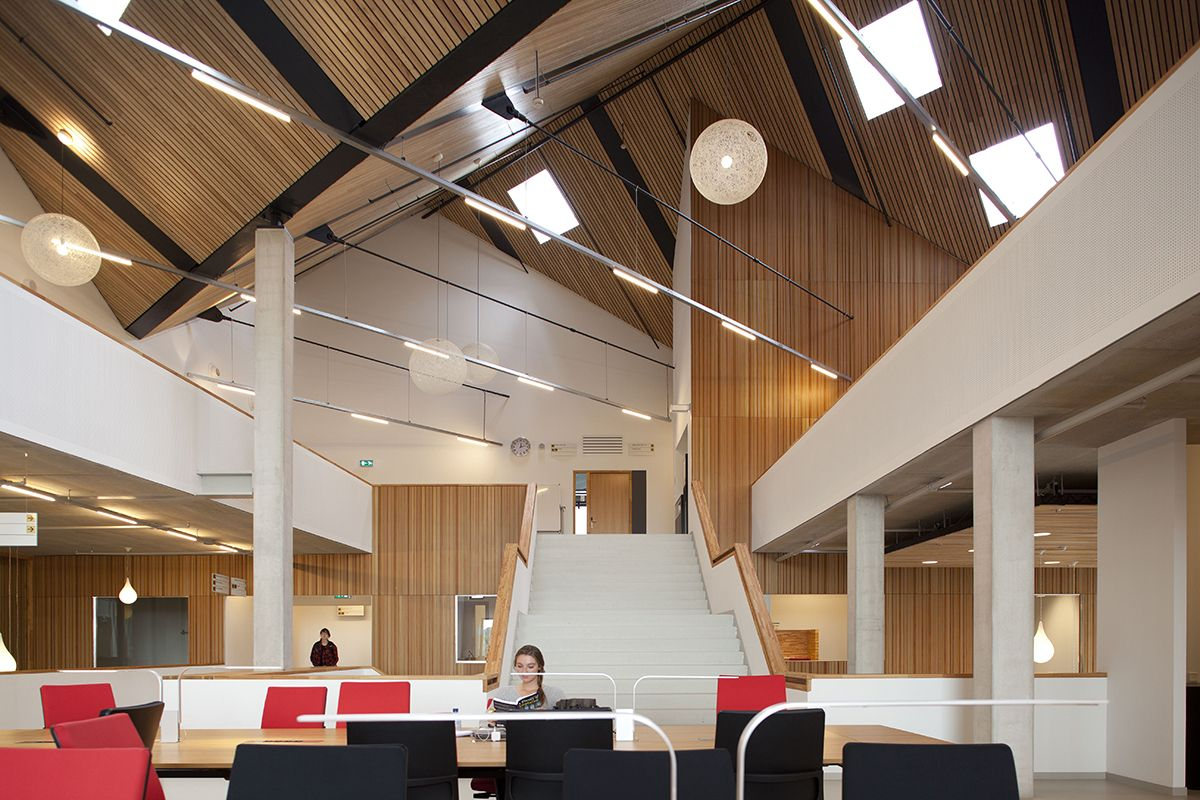
Inside the building.

AUC is a residential college with a campus in Amsterdam Science Park. It is located in the borough of Amsterdam-Oost, in what was formerly the borough of Watergraafsmeer. The campus houses an academic building, completed in 2012, and student residences managed by the student housing cooperation DUWO.

=== Academic building ===
AUC has a main academic building in Science Park Amsterdam, where most classes are taught. In line with AUC's promise of small classes, the building does not have an auditorium; larger events take place in its common room area. Lecture rooms and study areas are spread over three levels, and teacher's rooms are notably located in areas accessible to students.

The AUC academic building, opened in 2012, was designed by Mecanoo architects. Its exterior appearance is dominated by a façade of rust-coloured steel plates. The interior design received praise in the media for its "open character". The building won the 2013 Amsterdam Architecture Prize, for "the simplicity of its shape and its surprising interior. A variety of different types of space with a range of educational functions meet, connect and merge under one substantial roof, which is spectacular and yet unobtrusive."

The architecture of the academic building emphasises environmental sustainability. The roof is planted with grass, increasing insulation and acting as a water storeroom. In combination with a geothermal heat pump, this serves to minimise energy loss and consumption.

Before moving to its current location, for the first three years of its existence, AUC had a temporary academic building in the Plantage quarter, associated with the Roeterseiland location of the University of Amsterdam and opposite of the city's zoo, Artis.

=== Student residences ===
Students are required to maintain residence on campus for the whole duration of their studies. The student dorms are located on the Science Park campus close proximity AUC's academic building.

=== Science Park ===
The Science Park Amsterdam was initiated in 1996 as the location for a cluster of university buildings, research institutes and businesses. Next to AUC, the area also houses the University of Amsterdam Faculty of Sciences and several research institutes for physics, computer science, and mathematics. With two colocations of the Amsterdam Internet Exchange at the institutes SARA and Nikhef, the Science Park Amsterdam is one of the major Internet hubs in Europe.

The Amsterdam Science Park railway station connects the area to Amsterdam Central Station and Schiphol Airport in one direction and Almere in the other. A bus line connects the Science Park to Muiderpoort and Amstel railway stations.

== Student life ==
As a small residential college, AUC has a close-knit student community. Parts of campus life are organised by student committees, although many activities take place in an informal framework. In particular Dutch students of AUC also participate in student organisations off campus, including fraternities and traditional student clubs at the University of Amsterdam.

=== Student body ===
AUC matriculates 300 students every September. In the year 2023/24, enrollment was at about 879 students.

About 80% of students at AUC come from abroad, roughly 20% come from the Netherlands. International students hail from more than 65 countries, though most are citizens of the European Union.

=== Student organisation ===
Student activities at AUC are mostly organised under the umbrella of the Amsterdam University College Student Association (AUCSA). Each student which goes to AUC is automatically a member. Each student is allowed to suggest their own committee, which can take responsibility for organising activities. There is a broad range of committees with 35+ different committees which currently fall under the AUCSA. The AUCSA was founded in 2010, one year after AUC. Since then each year the Board members are elected at a General Assembly, where all students can vote.

=== Student politics ===
Until the academic year 2012/13, students were represented by the elected five-member Student Council responsible for administrative matters, as well as three non-elected student members (alongside three faculty members) on the Board of Studies, with an advisory function on academic matters. As of 2012/13, Student Council and Board of Studies have undergone an experimental merger, forming a College Council with five representatives of student body and faculty each. A further student representative on the Board of AUC fulfills a non-voting supervisory function.
