= Dirck Gerritsz Laboratory =

Dutch Antarctic base

- Antarctic base
- Location of Dirck Gerritsz Laboratory in Antarctica
- Coordinates: 67°34′15″S 68°07′41″W
- Country: Netherlands
- Administered by: Netherlands Organisation for Scientific Research
- Established: 27 January 2013
- Named after: Dirck Gerritsz Pomp
- Elevation: 16 m (52 ft)

Population (2017)
  - Summer: 10
  - Winter: 0
- Time zone: UTC-3 (AST)
- Type: Summer
- Activities: List: Climatology; Glaciology; Isotopic chemistry; Marine biology; Oceanography
- Website: www.nwo.nl

Dirck Gerritsz Laboratory is a Dutch Antarctic research facility on Adelaide Island near Rothera Research Station. It is operated by the Netherlands Polar Programme of the Dutch Research Council and British Antarctic Survey and was opened on 27 January 2013.

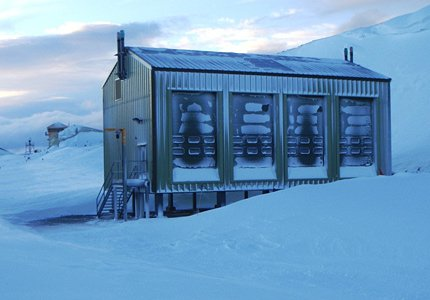

== History ==
In 2010 the Dutch Ministry of Education, Culture and Science gathered 6 million euros for research on climate change in Antarctica. The Dutch Research Council and the Royal Netherlands Institute for Sea Research began to design the laboratory. The station was officially opened on 27 January 2013.

The facility is named after Dutch explorer Dirck Gerritsz Pomp, who allegedly holds a claim as the first to sight islands off the Antarctic continent during an expedition from Europe to East Asia in 1599. The four mobile laboratories carry the names of the four ships, Hoop (Hope), Liefde (Love), Blijde Boodschap (Annunciation) and Geloof (Belief).

== Structure ==
The laboratory consists of four 20 TEU standard containers that were modified to be scientific laboratories. They are docked inside a custom made shed. In 2017-2021 the four labs were brought to Royal Netherlands Institute for Sea Research on Texel one by one for modifications and partial refurbishment. One of the containers labs subsequently was aboard the icebreaker RV Polarstern of the Alfred Wegener Institute for Polar and Marine Research during the MOSAiC Expedition in 2019/2020, before it was returned aboard the RRS Sir David Attenborough to Rothera research station. The laboratories could be sealifted to other Antarctic or Arctic stations as well.
