= Corina Brussaard =

Dutch scientist for Antarctic viral ecology

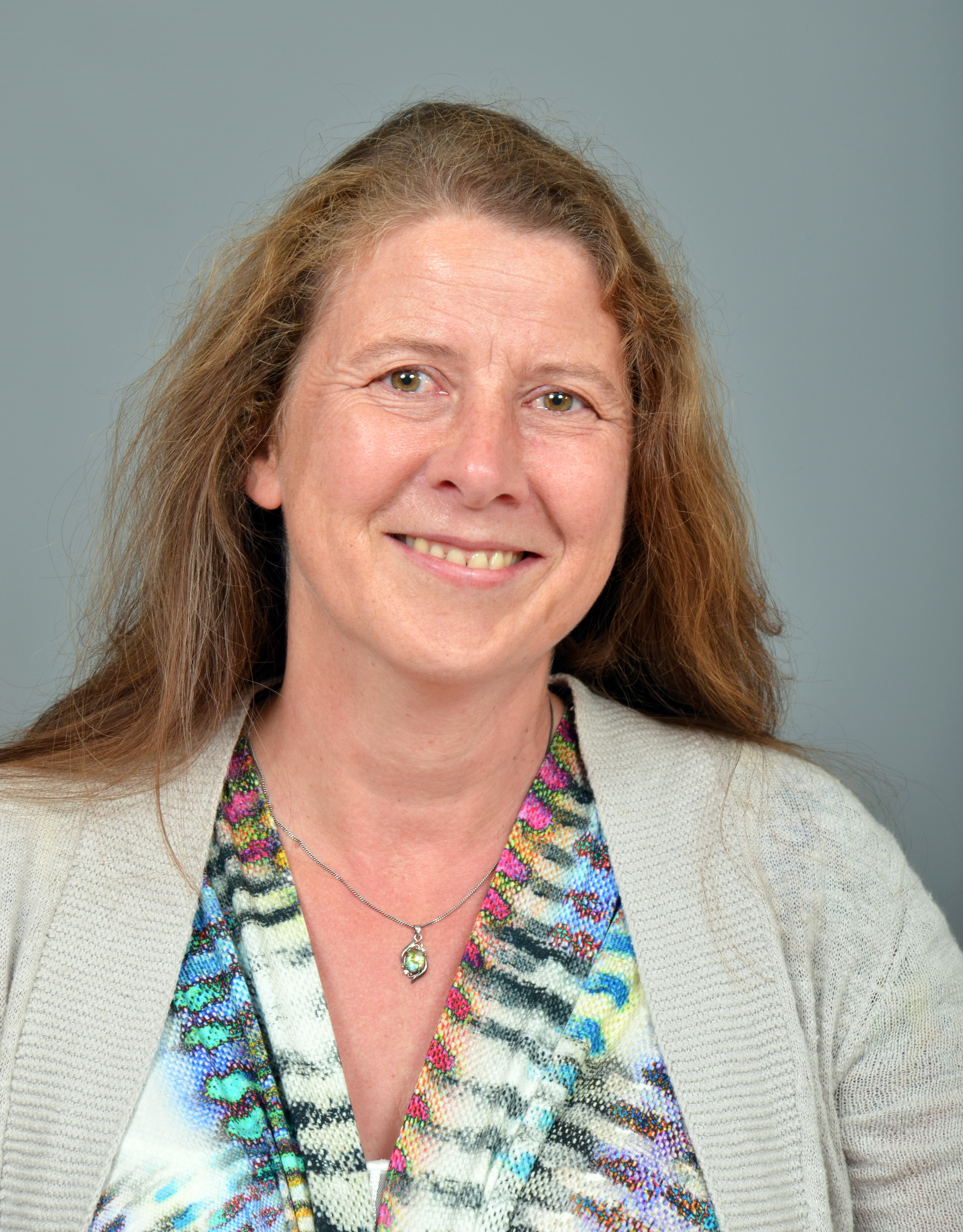
- Education: University of Amsterdam
- Scientific career
- Fields: Antarctic viral ecology
- Workplaces: Institute for Biodiversity and Ecosystem Dynamics
- Website: https://www.nioz.nl/staff-detail?id=140024

Corina P. D. Brussaard is a Dutch scientist for Antarctic viral ecology working for the Royal Institute of Sea Research (NIOZ) and is a Special Professor of Viral Ecology at the Institute for Biodiversity and Ecosystem Dynamics of the University of Amsterdam (UvA).

== Early life and education ==
Brussaard was educated at University of Groningen (RUG), The Netherlands, studying marine biology, and microbial ecology. She defended her PhD thesis on 'Phytoplankton cell lysis and ecological implications' in 1997. She was awarded a Marie Curie TMR-grant supplied by the EC for 2 year Post Doctoral research at the University of Bergen, Norway. In 2000 she started as Independent Research Fellow at the NIOZ Royal Netherlands Institute of Sea Research where she was involved in the EC-FP5 project BIOHAB (Biological Control of Harmful Algal Blooms - role of eutrophication) studying the growth and mortality of HAB-species, while at the same time setting up a virus ecology research program. She became a senior research scientist at the NIOZ in 2003, and obtained a special chair in Viral Ecology in the Institute for Biodiversity and Ecosystem Dynamics (IBED) at the University of Amsterdam (UvA) in 2013.

== Career and impact ==
Brussaard is a scientist for Antarctic viral ecology, the quantitative and qualitative significance of viral mediated mortality of microbes for population dynamics, community composition, and the production and efficiency of the pelagic food web. Brussaard's research focuses on studying the interaction between viruses and their host algae in relation to climate change, and more specifically on how this interaction is affected by environmental factors, such as CO_{2} concentration and temperature, the availability of light and nutrients.

Brussaard studies the ecological role viruses play in the sea, combining field work and detailed laboratory studies. She investigates the importance of microbial (phytoplankton and bacteria) cell death rates and its consequences for the pelagic biogeochemical cycling (carbon, nutrients including iron), as well as isolation of novel algae-infecting viruses (e.g. viruses infecting Phaeocystis belonging to the recently named large-genome Mimiviridae family). She also discovered the first dsRNA virus that infects protists and lipid membrane-containing Micromonas viruses. Additionally she has developed methods for the rapid detection and enumeration of viruses, and for measuring cell lysis rates as a consequence of viral infections.

Brussaard is the President of the International Society of Microbes (ISVM) and is also the Chair of the Netherlands Scientific Committee on Oceanic Research (SCOR) Committee from 2006 until 2016 and its secretary from 2014–2018. She was also a member of the Netherlands Polar Committee from 2010–2014 and is a Fellow of the American Academy Microbiology and of the Council for Earth and Life Sciences of the Royal Netherlands Academy of Arts and Sciences.

Brussaard's research has received interest from radio, newspapers and magazines. Moreover, Brussaard was a guest on the Dutch television show Pauw & Witteman on 23 January 2013 to discuss the then new Dutch Dirck Gerritsz Laboratory.

In March 2016, Brussaard was selected as a Fellow of the American Academy of Microbiology.
