= RV Pelagia =

Research vessel of the Royal Netherlands Institute of Sea Research

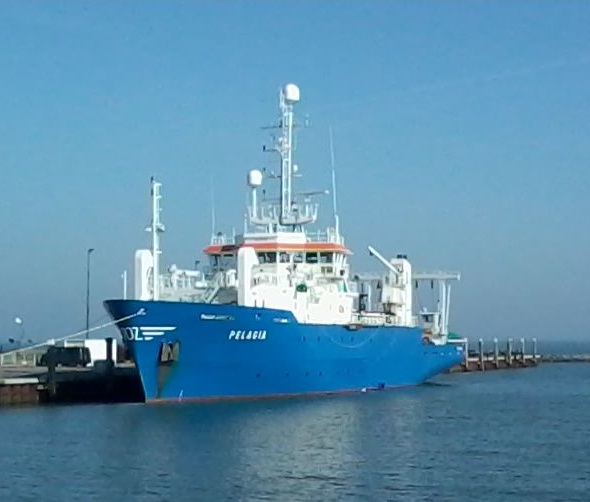
- The Pelagia at her homeport Texel, 2013

History

Netherlands
- Name: Pelagia
- Owner: NIOZ
- Operator: NIOZ
- Builder: Verolme Shipyard
- Yard number: 1019
- Launched: March 1991
- Completed: June 1991
- Home port: Texel
- Identification: IMO 9001461

General characteristics
- Type: Research vessel
- Tonnage: 1671 tons
- Length: 66m
- Beam: 12.8m
- Draft: 4.2m
- Depth: 6.85m
- Speed: 9-11 knots
- Endurance: Diesel-electric
- Capacity: 11-13
- Crew: 11-13

RV Pelagia is a research vessel in the service of the Royal Netherlands Institute of Sea Research (NIOZ), a research institute of the Dutch Research Council (NWO). It was built in 1991 by Verolme Shipyard in Heusden, The Netherlands, and has been in NIOZ-service since. The RV Pelagia is due to be replaced but on 14 April 2022 a Dutch court ruled that the original contract must be amended, resulting in a delay of the final tender for the replacement that will bear the name RV Anna Weber-van Bosse, after the Netherlands' first female marine biologist to conduct research at sea.

== Research ==
The NIOZ is a Dutch research institute in the field of oceanographic sciences. In order to do this research the NIOZ has a number of research vessel in service. The RV Pelagia is one of them. On board all kinds of survey are carried out. For instance bottom surface research to corals or a research on the amount of nutrients in the water. On board there are facilities to do this field work like fixed laboratoria or places for mobile laboratoria. But also conventional oceangoing equipment like cranes and winches for getting the equipment in and out of the water.

Usually these are remotely operated vehicle like appliances like a CTD or a piston core. Furthermore, there is fixed research equipment placed on board the Pelagia like an aquaflow, multibeam, HIPAP and ADCP for carrying out continuous survey.

== Voyages ==
Legally the RV Pelagia is a merchant ship. It falls under the same rules and regulations as any freight carrier. The RV Pelagia is suitable for oceangoing voyages. However usually she is deployed in the waters around Europe.

== The Vessel ==
The RV Pelagia is equipped with diesel-electric propulsion. On board there are three generatorsets installed. Two of these are used to generate the power for the propulsion. In port the emergency generator is used for the auxiliaries. The two main engines are caterpillars 3508 and 3512 with an output of about 800 kW and 1000 kW. In 2010 the Pelagia received an overhaul and upgrade at the Astander Shipyard in Santander, Spain.
