= Caribbean Netherlands Science Institute =

Research facility on Sint Eustatius

The Caribbean Netherlands Science Institute, also known as CNSI, is a scientific research facility in the Caribbean Netherlands, specifically on the island of Sint Eustatius. CNSI was officially opened in 2014. It was created by NIOZ (the Royal Netherlands Institute of Sea Research, aka Nederlands Instituut voor Zeeonderzoek) and is also closely allied with the Faculty of Archaeology of Leiden University, IMARES Wageningen UR, Naturalis Biodiversity Centre, and the Royal Netherlands Institute of Southeast Asian and Caribbean Studies.
