= Netherlands Polar Programme =

Dutch Antarctic and Arctic research programme

The Netherlands Polar Programme (Nederlands Polair Programma or NPP) is the Dutch Antarctic and Arctic research programme. It is administered by the Dutch Research Council based in The Hague in the Netherlands. The programme is positioned in the framework of the Netherlands' Polar Strategy and is funded by a coalition of five ministries of the Dutch government and the Dutch Research Council. It periodically publishes its own research programme strategy titled PolePosition-NL.

== History ==
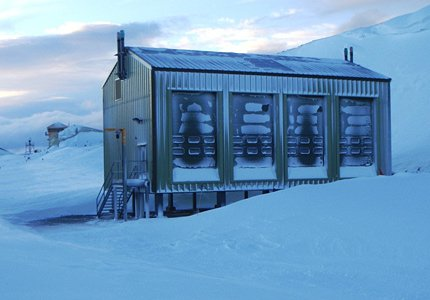
The Dutch Dirck Gerritsz Laboratory at Rothera research station, Antarctica.

The Netherlands Polar Programme was established as the Netherlands Antarctic Programme in 1984 and was one of the arguments for granting the Netherlands consultative status in the Antarctic Treaty System in 1990. The Netherlands became the first party to the Antarctic Treaty to obtain this status without its own research station in the Antarctic region. The Netherlands Arctic Programme was founded in 2002, after the Netherlands had obtained observer status in the Arctic Council in 1998. The two separate polar programmes merged in 2011 at the launch of the joint strategy plan PolePosition-NL 1.0.

In 2013 the Netherlands Polar Programme opened the Dirck Gerritsz Laboratory at Rothera Research Station on Adelaide Island, on the Pacific side of the Antarctic Peninsula. It has a life expectancy of 25 years. Rothera was visited by the Crown Prince Willem-Alexander of the Netherlands and Princess Máxima in 2009, in recognition of the good scientific collaboration of British and Dutch researchers.

The programme funds the Dutch research facility in Ny-Ålesund, Svalbard. The Arctic Centre of the University of Groningen operates the research facility in cooperation with Kings Bay AS.

== Activities ==
The Netherlands Polar Programme's chief task is to fund polar research that is carried out at circa fifteen universities and public institutes in the Netherlands. To this end, it regularly opens calls for proposal that are normally open to Dutch researchers only. It has also funded several consortium calls and calls tailored to unique endeavors, such as the Fourth International Polar Year in 2007–2008, MOSAiC Expedition in 2019-2020 and the SEES.nl expeditions to Edgeøya, Svalbard in 2015 and 2022.

In addition to research funding, the programme manages the Dirck Gerritsz Laboratory and two standing partnerships with the British Antarctic Survey and the Alfred Wegener Institute for Polar and Marine Research, which date back to the 1980s.

The Netherlands Polar Programme is the national coordinator of the Dutch representation in the Scientific Committee on Antarctic Research, Council of Managers of National Antarctic Programs, International Arctic Science Committee, European Polar Board, Forum of Arctic Research Operators and Arctic Funders Forum. It also funds the Dutch participation in four of the Arctic Council working groups.

The NPP secretariat acts as the contact point for international polar research funding, governance and support.

A Polar Symposium is held annually and is usually co-organised by the Association of Polar Early Career Scientists Netherlands.
