= Diemen railway station =

Railway station in the Netherlands

Diemen
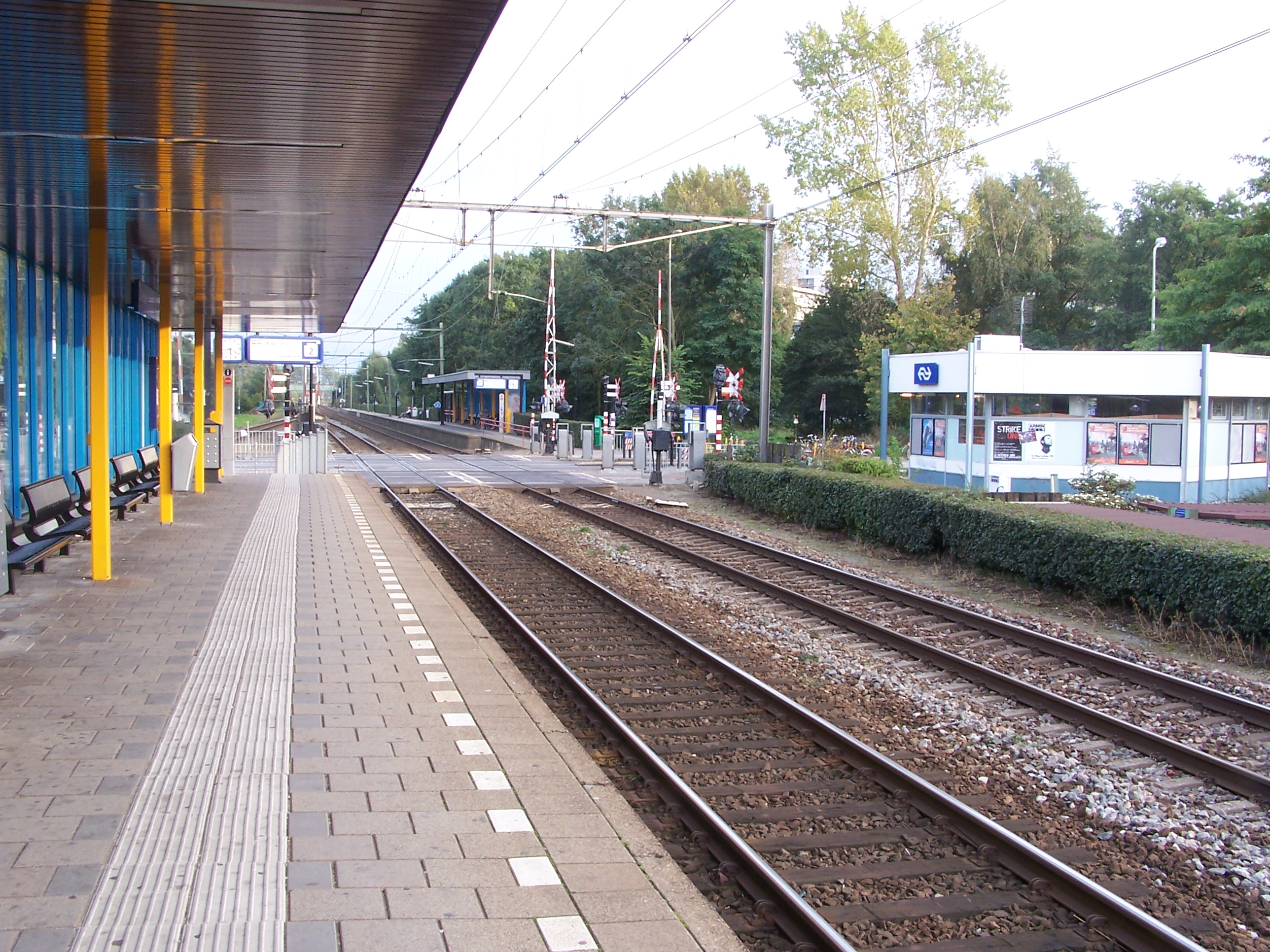
- Diemen railway station in 2005

General information
- Location: Van Gemertplein 1, Diemen; Netherlands
- Coordinates: 52°20′43″N 4°58′1″E
- Operator: HSM (1868–1929); NS (1974–present)
- Line: Amsterdam–Zutphen railway
- Platforms: 2
- Connections: Bus lines 44, N87

Other information
- Station code: Dmn

History
- Opened: 1 August 1882, reopened 26 May 1974
- Closed: 1 January 1929

Services
Preceding station	Nederlandse Spoorwegen	Following station
Amsterdam Science Park towards Amsterdam Centraal	NS Sprinter 4600 Until 20:00	Weesp towards Almere Oostvaarders
Amsterdam Science Park towards Amsterdam Centraal	NS Sprinter 5800	Weesp towards Amersfoort Vathorst
Location
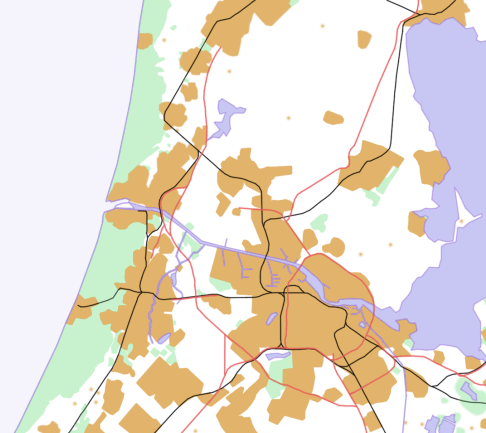
- Location within Northern Randstad Location within Netherlands

Diemen (abbreviation: Dmn) is the main railway station of the municipality of Diemen, Netherlands. It is located on the Amsterdam–Zutphen railway between Amsterdam Science Park and Weesp. The station was first opened in 1882 and then closed in 1929. It was reopened at the same location in 1974. The station building was completed in 1978. The train services are operated by Nederlandse Spoorwegen. Among the direct destinations are Almere, Amersfoort, Amsterdam Centraal, Hilversum, Lelystad, and Zwolle. There are connections to two bus services operated by GVB.

== Location ==
The railway station is located at 52°20′43″N 4°58′1″E in the town of Diemen, which is part of the City Region of Amsterdam, in the south of the province of North Holland in the west of the Netherlands. It is situated on the Amsterdam–Zutphen railway between the railway stations Amsterdam Science Park and Weesp.

== Building ==
The hexagonal station building was completed in 1978. It is of the type Sextant, which was designed by Cees Douma. Sixteen buildings of this type have been built in the years 1968–1979, seven of which remain today.

== Train services ==
The railway station was opened on 1 August 1882. The first train services were operated by the Hollandsche IJzeren Spoorweg-Maatschappij (HSM). The station was closed on 1 January 1929.

The station was reopened on 26 May 1974 at the same location. The HSM had merged into the Nederlandse Spoorwegen (NS) in 1938, which has operated the train services in Diemen since the reopening.

The following local Sprinter train services each call at Diemen twice per hour in both directions:

- 4600: Amsterdam Centraal – Diemen – Almere Centrum – Lelystad Centrum – Zwolle
- 5800: Hoofddorp – Schiphol – Amsterdam Centraal – Diemen – Hilversum – Amersfoort – Amersfoort Vathorst

== Connections ==
There are two bus connections at the station, which are both operated by Gemeentelijk Vervoerbedrijf (GVB):

- 44 (day service): Amsterdam Bijlmer ArenA – Diemen Zuid – Diemen – Diemen Noord
- N87 (night service): Amsterdam Centraal – Diemen – Amsterdam Bijlmer ArenA
