= Rothera Research Station =

- Antarctic base
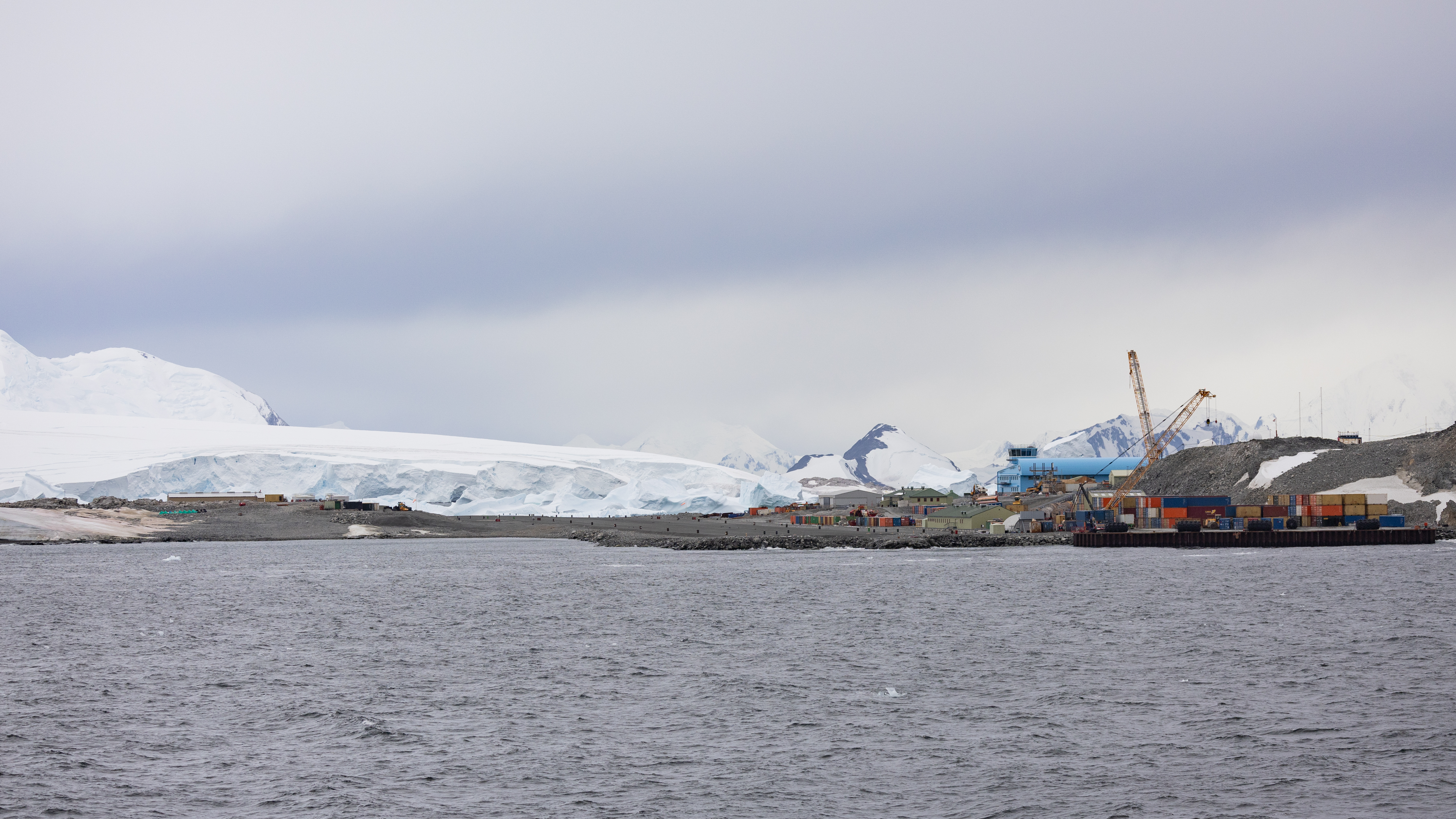
- Rothera seen from a ship in January 2026

- Rothera Research Station location within the British Antarctic Territory in Antarctica

- Location of Rothera Research Station in Antarctica
- Coordinates: 67°34′08″S 68°07′30″W
- Country: United Kingdom
- British Overseas Territory: British Antarctic Territory
- Location in Antarctica: Adelaide Island
- Administered by: British Antarctic Survey
- Established: 25 October 1975
- Elevation: 16 m (52 ft)

Population (2017)
  - Summer: 160
  - Winter: 27
- UN/LOCODE: AQ ROT
- Type: All-year round
- Period: Annual
- Status: Operational
- Activities: Biology, Oceanography, Glaciology
- Website: www.bas.ac.uk/polar-operations/sites-and-facilities/facility/rothera/

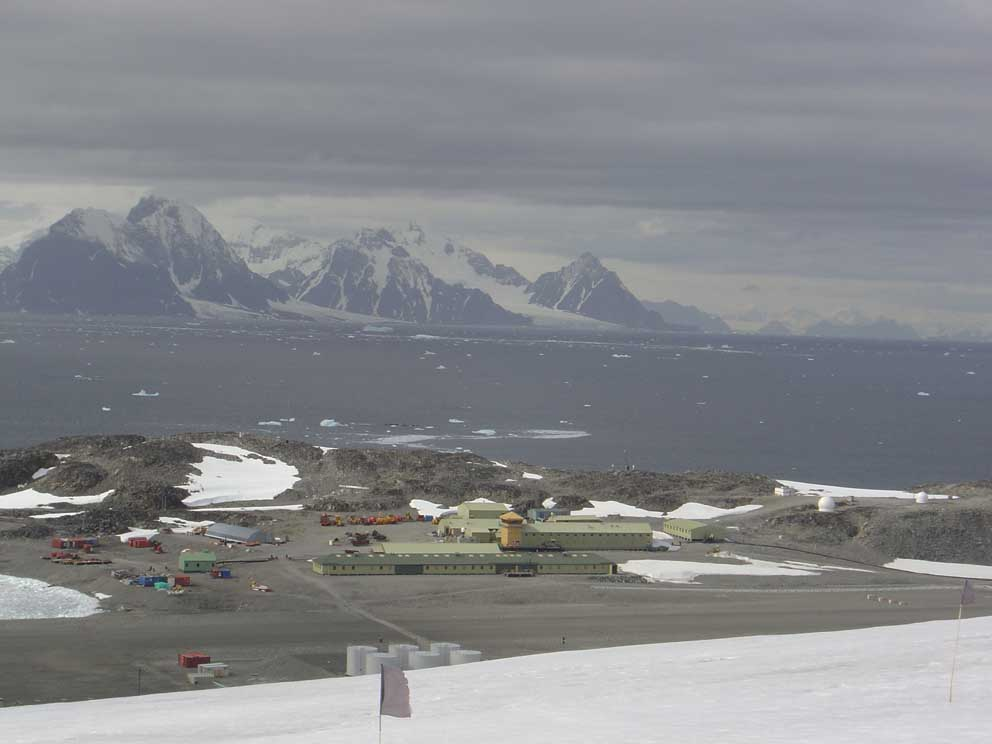
The base in summer, looking southeast

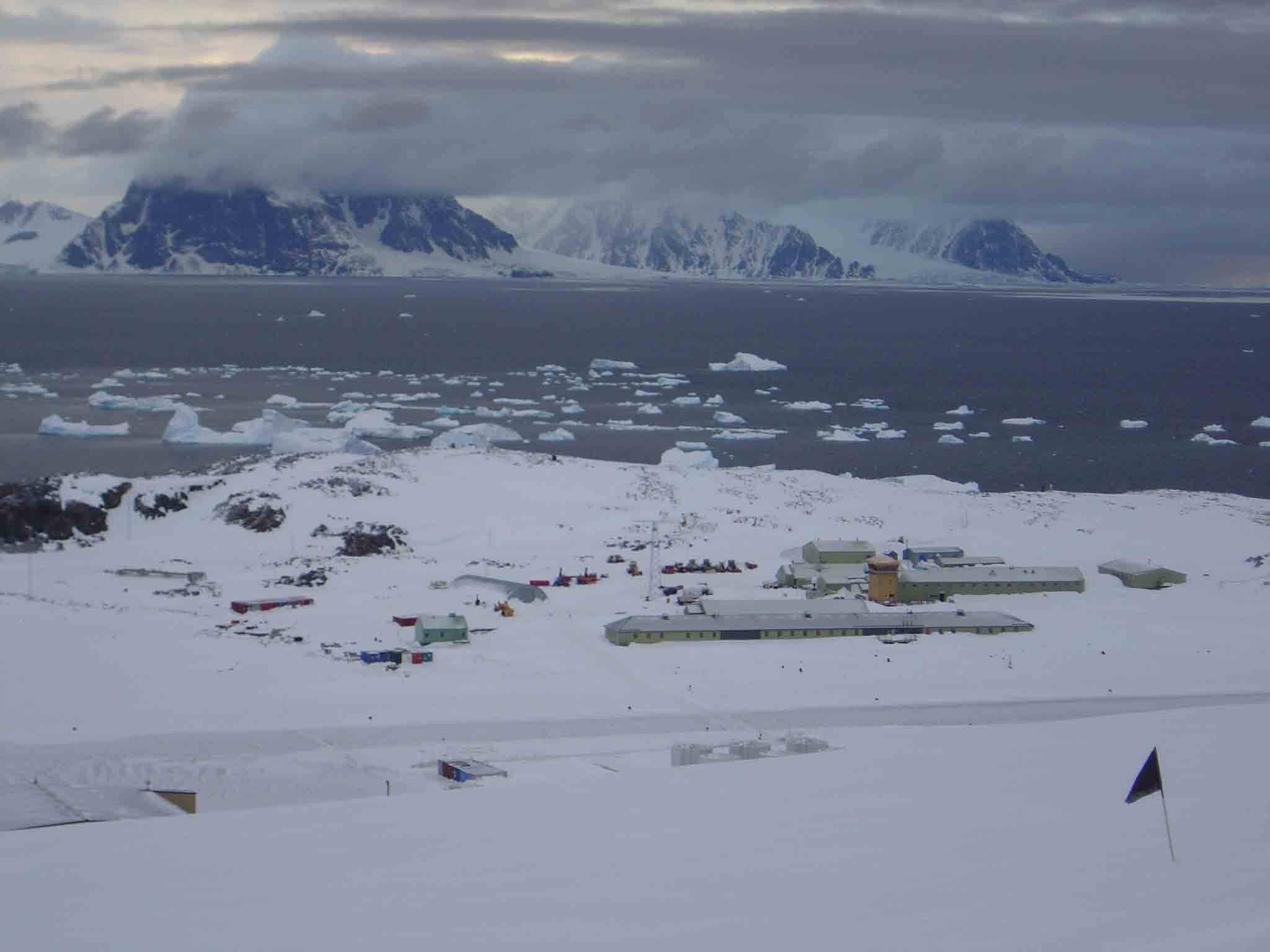
Rothera Station from Reptile Ridge (above the station) in November 2003. The preceding winter had been one of very heavy snow accumulation.

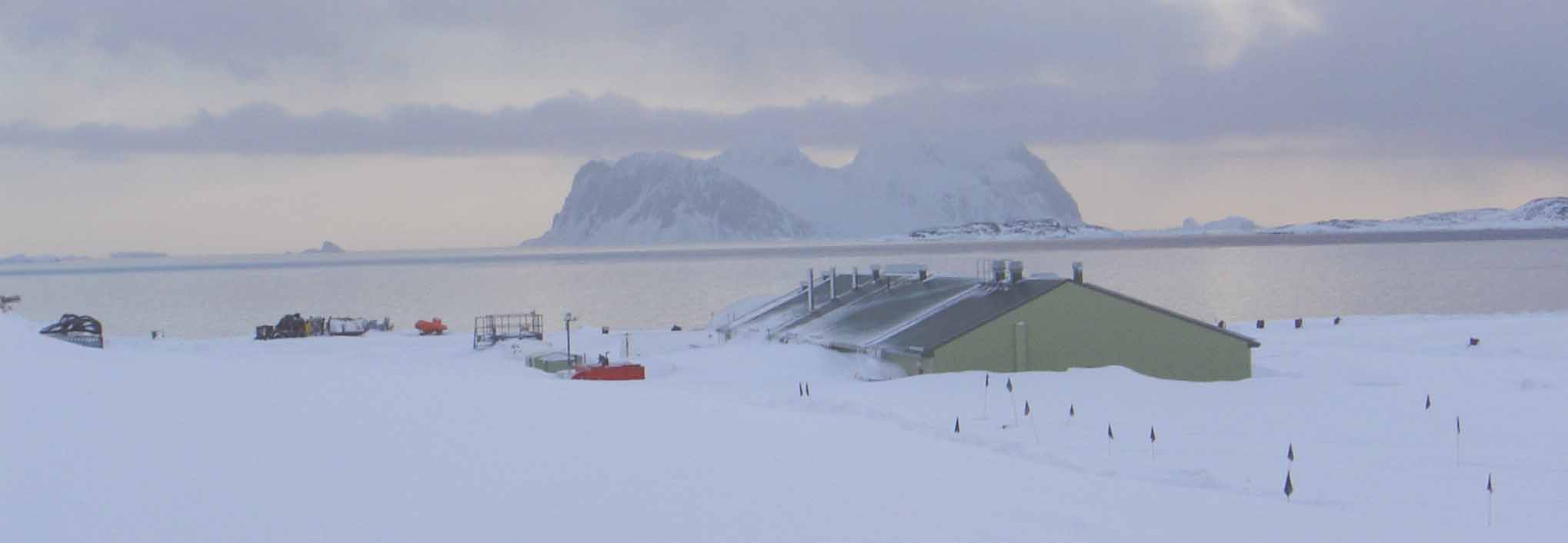
The New Bonner Lab at Rothera Station in November 2003

The Rothera Research Station is a British Antarctic Survey (BAS) base on the Antarctic Peninsula, located at Rothera Point, Adelaide Island. Rothera also serves as the capital of the British Antarctic Territory, a British Overseas Territory.

== History and current activities ==
Rothera station was established in 1975 to replace Adelaide station (1961–1977) where the skiway had deteriorated.

The opening of the Bonner Laboratory in 1996/1997 marked the start of new activities in biological sciences in the Antarctic peninsula. These included scuba diving, experiments conducted in the Bonner Laboratory and the start of the Rothera Oceanographic and Biological Time Series (RaTS) with measurements of the adjacent Ryder Bay throughout the year. The first Bonner Lab burned down in the winter of 2001 after an electrical fault; it was rebuilt and opened in December 2003. Meteorological research using satellite data intercepted at the Rothera ground station also continues year round.

In January 2017, it was announced that the Rothera Research Station will receive £100m in funding from the government. The money is being used by the British Antarctic Survey to build new living quarters, storage and a new wharf. Tim Stockings, its director of operations called the investment “an exciting moment for polar science”. A portion of the money will also be used to fund the modernisation of facilities and buildings at the British Antarctic stations at Signy Research Station, at Bird Island, South Georgia and at King Edward Point, South Georgia.

Fieldwork is concentrated in the summer months from October until March. Once in the field, the parties travel using snowmobiles and sledges for up to four months, and, being in daily HF radio communication with Rothera, they can be resupplied when necessary by air. PistenBullies are used for larger science and logistics traverses

The station is open throughout the year with a maximum population of 160 in the summer and an average winter population of 27.

=== Rocket science ===
In 1998, 26 sounding rockets of "Viper"-type were launched from Rothera Research Station. They reached altitudes of 100 kilometres (over 60 mi).

== Buildings at Rothera ==
Rothera has evolved from a small base (in its first winter it housed only four people) to the large complex it is today. As is the case everywhere in Antarctica, the buildings need constant repair, and eventual renewal, as the harsh environment takes its toll. Although some of the buildings are very new, some of the older ones still survive, often having undergone many different uses.

=== New Bransfield House ===
This two-storey building houses the communal dining area, kitchen, bar, library, film/TV rooms, computer facilities, phone booth and the post office/ station shop. It was opened in 2008. In 2025, by royal command of King Charles III, a new Royal Mail postbox was installed to replace the unofficial handmade one.

=== Old Bransfield House ===
This was re-built from the original in 1985/1986, using parts of the old building. The building was the hub of the base, it has the bulk of the non-science offices, computer rooms, communication facilities, meteorological facilities and food storage. The building was named after the former BAS ship RRS Bransfield, itself named after the Irish sailor and explorer Edward Bransfield. There is a link corridor to the garage, and on one end is the operations tower, used during flight operations. Bransfield also produces all the fresh water for the base using a reverse osmosis plant. This was installed to replace old melt tanks, which were used to melt snow.

=== Admirals House ===
Admirals House was built over two seasons (1999/2000 and 2000/2001). It is a prefabricated unit from Top Housing AB of Sweden. The building has 44 two-person rooms, each with a shower and toilet facility. The building has washing facilities and heated boot rooms. It is named after a dog team that operated out of Rothera.

=== Bonner Lab ===
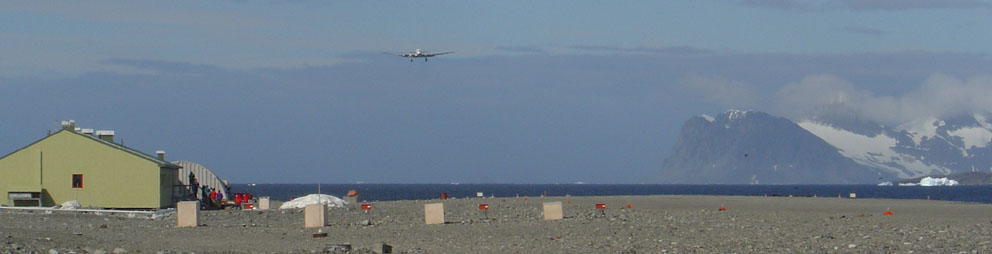
Bonner Lab and Boat Shed at Rothera. Basler DC-3 landing

The Bonner Lab has been built twice, the first time by Tilbury Douglas in 1996/1997.

A fire in winter 2001, caused by an electrical fault, destroyed the building, though nobody was hurt. The lab was then rebuilt in the 2002/2003 seasons and opened in the 2003/2004 season. The Bonner Lab is a state-of-the-art facility for terrestrial and marine biology. The dive facility (with decompression chamber, warming bath, and compressors) keeps diving safely going throughout the year. There are three dry labs, one wet lab, aquarium, library, microscope room and a small kitchen. During the winter this large facility is left in the hands of three diving and boating officers and two marine biologists, although this can vary depending on the projects underway at the time. In the summer, as many as 30 science staff can occupy the building, and upwards of 10 divers can be using the facility. The lab was named after W. Nigel Bonner, head of biological science at BAS between 1953 and 1986, and deputy director of BAS from 1986 to 1988. The original lab was built in response to the base at Signy being down scaled to a summer only facility and the increased accessibility of Rothera after the runway construction. The Dirck Gerritsz Laboratory is adjacent and houses researchers from Netherlands Polar Programme working alongside those in the Bonner Lab

=== Fuchs House ===
Also known as the Sledge Store, or Phase III. The building was erected in 1978/79, and originally housed the science offices, cold room and travel store. It is now used mainly as the travel store or sledge store. The huge amount of mountaineering or camping equipment for use in Antarctica is maintained and stored here. The cold store remains, with four large freezers storing all the base's frozen food. It was named after Sir Vivian Fuchs, BAS director from 1958 to 1973.

=== Giants House ===
Erected in 1996/1997 as transit accommodation, it contains eight rooms of four beds, and a toilet / shower facility. The building is only used in summer.

=== Generator shed, chippy shop, and Bingham ===
Bingham House was originally at Adelaide Island Base, and is as such the oldest building on site. It was pulled across from Base T in the winter of 1977. It was used as accommodation, but is now used as a building store. Bingham was named after E W Bingham, leader of FIDS 1945 to 1947 and FIDS surgeon commander.

Next door is the chippy shop, which was the original Rothera Base, being built in the 1976/1977 season. This building housed the base kitchen and eating facilities until the original Bransfield was built some four years later. As suggested by its name it is now the carpentry workshop, and also houses the electricians' store and workshop.

The generator shed houses four Volvo Penta generators and has its own stores and workshop facilities. There are also two Perkins Engines 1506A-E88TAG3 engines on-site at Rothera.

=== The Span and boat shed ===
The Span and Boat Shed were built at approximately the same time using similar techniques (interlocking steel archways on a concrete base), and are located at either end of the site. The Span was the storage facility for vehicles, equipment and waste but has now been demolished for the construction of the Discovery Building, with a temporary waste handling building erected nearby. It was called the Span as it was manufactured by the Miracle-Span company which specialises in these buildings. The Boat Shed is used to store, maintain and operate the boats for travel to the local islands, diving and oceanographic sampling (all RIBs of various size). It is situated next to the Biscoe Wharf (named after the RRS John Biscoe). There is a hydraulic crane to lift the boats in and out of the water, with access via a rope ladder.

=== Sewage treatment plant and hangar ===
The sewage treatment plant was built in summer 2002/2003. The sewage is treated using bacteria, which leave a peat-like substance that is dry and compact enough to remove from Antarctica. The hangar was built at the same time as the runway and is big enough for three Twin Otters and the Dash 7.

=== Refuges and other buildings ===
There is a refuge hut on Lagoon. This was built out of the materials left over from the original Bransfield House at Rothera. The hut has a stove, fuel, food and four bunks. There is also spare dry clothing, bedding and a pyramid tent. Boat teams who get caught out by bad weather or sea ice can use the refuge. It is often used during the summer months as a place for BAS staff to go and relax. There is an Apple hut on the Leonie Island, which was provided by the Dutch Antarctic Division during a joint working programme. There was also a Melon Hut on Lagoon for the same purpose, but this has now been moved to Anchorage Island.

=== Cultural events ===
Nunatak was the BAS’s house band. The five person indie rock band is part of a science team investigating climate change and evolutionary biology on the Antarctic Peninsula. They are chiefly known for their participation in Live Earth in 2007, where they were the only band to play in the event's Antarctica concert.

== Climate ==
Being located just South of the Antarctic Circle, the weather is cold year round. Temperatures in summer barely go over freezing.

Climate data for Rothera Point, Antarctica
Month	Jan	Feb	Mar	Apr	May	Jun	Jul	Aug	Sep	Oct	Nov	Dec	Year
Daily mean °C (°F)	0.8 (33.4)	−0.1 (31.8)	−1.9 (28.6)	−4.5 (23.9)	−7.1 (19.2)	−9.9 (14.2)	−11.6 (11.1)	−11.8 (10.8)	−9.1 (15.6)	−6.1 (21.0)	−2.8 (27.0)	0.1 (32.2)	−5.3 (22.4)

== Rothera Air Facility ==
Rothera Research Station
- IATA: none; ICAO: EGAR

Summary
- Serves: Rothera Research Station
- Location: Antarctic Peninsula
- Interactive map of Rothera Research Station

Runways
Direction	Length		Surface
Direction	ft	m	Surface
	2,950	900	Crushed rock

The station has a 900 m (2,950 ft) crushed rock runway, with an associated hangar and bulk fuel storage facility, and a wharf for the discharge of cargo from supply ships. There is a transitory summer population of scientists and support staff who reach Rothera either by ship or through use of a De Havilland Canada Dash 7 aircraft flying from the Falkland Islands or Punta Arenas in Chile.

From its inception until the 1991/1992 summer season, BAS Twin Otter aircraft used the skiway 300 m (about 1000 ft) above the station on Wormald Ice Piedmont. With the commissioning of the gravel runway and hangar in 1991/1992 air operations became more reliable and access to Rothera was greatly improved through a direct airlink from the Falkland Islands. The Twin Otters mainly fly south of Rothera, via a network of fuel depots, two of which are staffed. Heading south of Rothera, the first stop would be Fossil Bluff, then Sky Blu. The Dash 7 will make approximately 20 flights a season, mostly to Punta Arenas, with some to RAF Mount Pleasant on the Falkland Islands, bringing in scientists, support staff, food and equipment. When not tasked for these flights, the Dash can fly to Sky Blu in one hop, landing on the Blue Ice runway, significantly enhancing the range of the Twin Otters by depositing fuel and equipment in much larger quantities. Fuel is also supplied to Sky Blu and other depots by RAF air drop.

Many transiting Twin Otters and Basler BT-67 of other Antarctic operators are also refuelled at Rothera, with the gravel runway allowing them to cross to or from South America without skis, which would create too much drag for the long flight.

== See also ==
- List of Antarctic research stations
- List of Antarctic field camps
- List of airports in Antarctica
