= Amsterdam Science Park =

Science park in Amsterdam, Netherlands

Coordinates: 52.356°N 4.953°E

Amsterdam Science Park is a science park in the Oost borough of Amsterdam, Netherlands with focus on physics, mathematics, information technology and the life sciences. The 70 hectare (175 acre) park provides accommodations for science, business and housing. Resident groups include institutes of the natural science faculties of the University of Amsterdam, several research institutes, and related companies. Three of the colocations of the Amsterdam Internet Exchange are at the institutes SURFsara, NIKHEF, and Equinix-AM3 at the science park. The park is also home to Amsterdam University College, the liberal arts branch of the UVA.

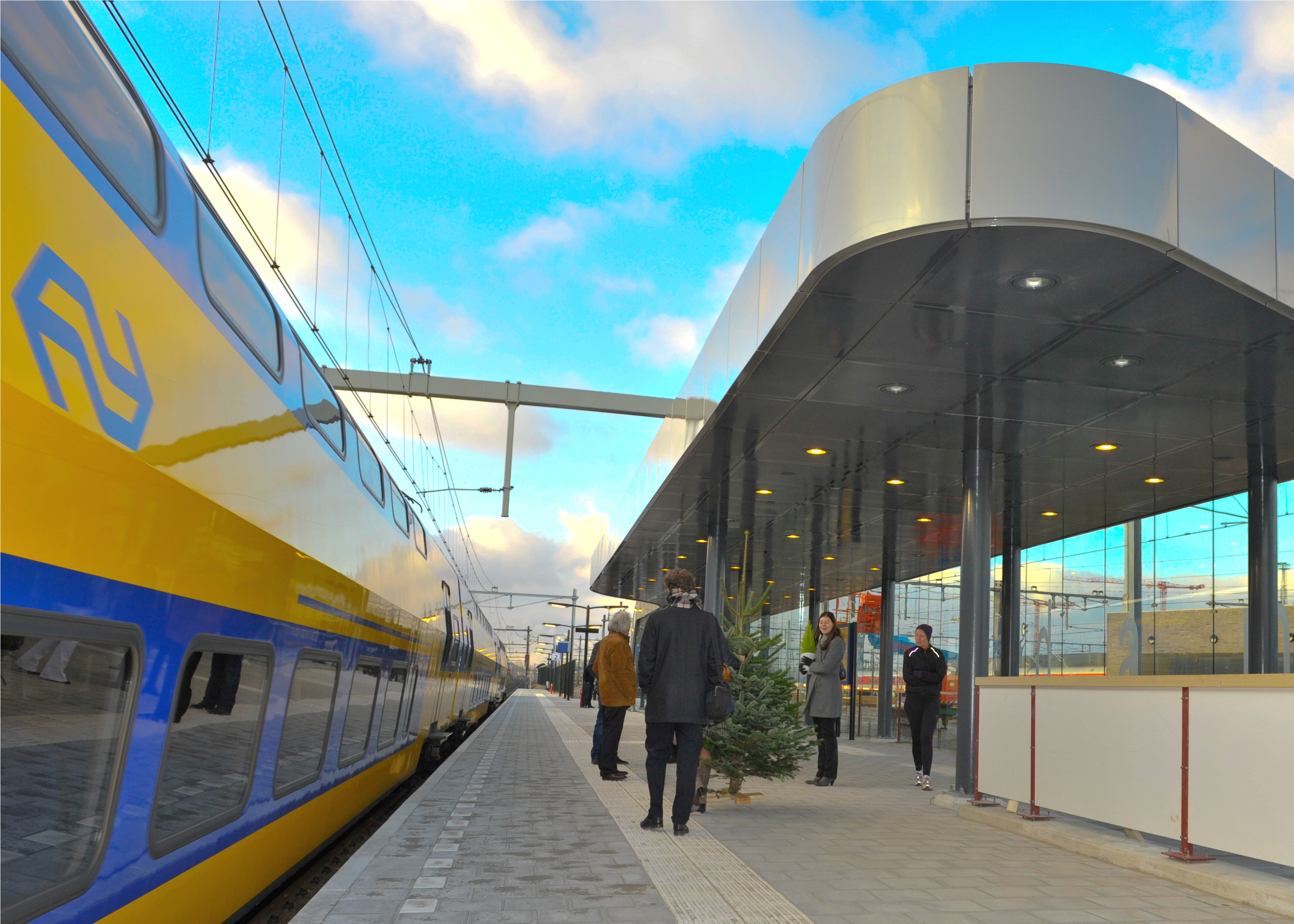
Amsterdam Science Park railway station

In 2009, the Amsterdam Science Park railway station was opened by then-mayor Job Cohen.

== Science and business ==
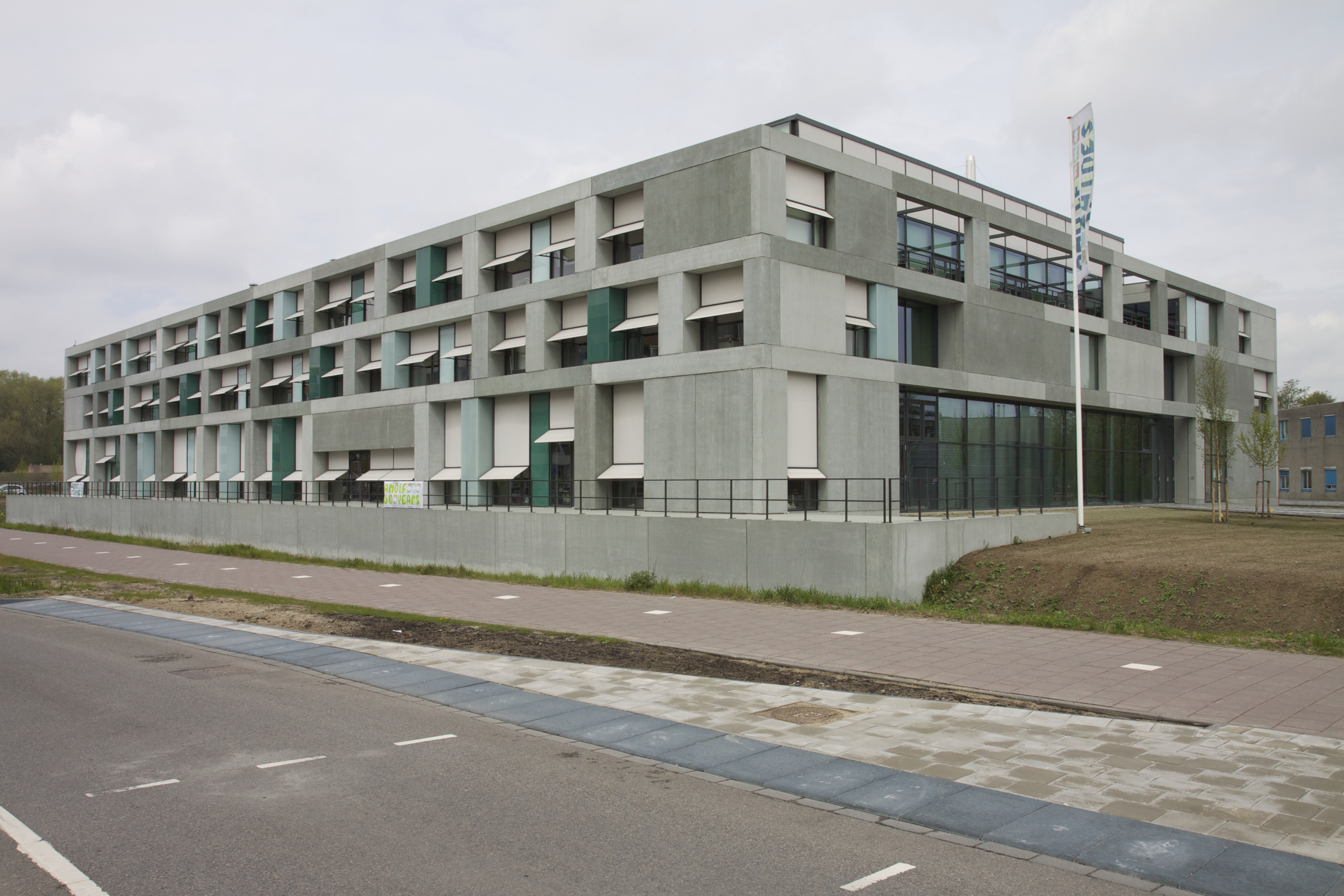
AMOLF at the Science Park

- FOM Institute AMOLF (Physics of Biomolecular systems and Nanophotonics)
- Advanced Research Center for Nanolithography (ARCNL)
- National Research Institute for Mathematics and Computer Science (CWI)
- Faculty of Science (FNWI) of the University of Amsterdam offering education programmes in biology, chemistry, computer science, earth science, physics, mathematics etc. and comprising eight research institutes, including:
  - Anton Pannekoek Institute for Astronomy
  - Institute for Biodiversity and Ecosystem Dynamics (IBED)
  - Institute for Logic, Language and Computation (ILLC)
  - Institute of Physics (IoP)
  - Korteweg-de Vries Institute for Mathematics (KdVI)
- Netherlands eScience Center (NLeSC)
- National Institute for Subatomic Physics (Nikhef)
- SURFsara (computer centre)
- EGI.eu, the coordinating organisation for the European Grid Infrastructure
- More than 90 companies in the fields of ICT, life sciences, and related fields (e.g. BioDetection Systems)

== Housing ==
At the science park, 314 residences and 721 student units have been completed. An additional 423 residences and 617 student units are planned.

== Leisure ==
- Café-restaurant 'Polder' (temporary location adjacent to the historical Anna Hoeve farm)
- University Sports Centre 'Universum' (official opening October 8, 2010)
- Sports Café 'Oerknal'
- Meet & Eat Restaurant
- BICO
- Ann's Farm
