= Stan Bentvelsen =

Dutch physicist

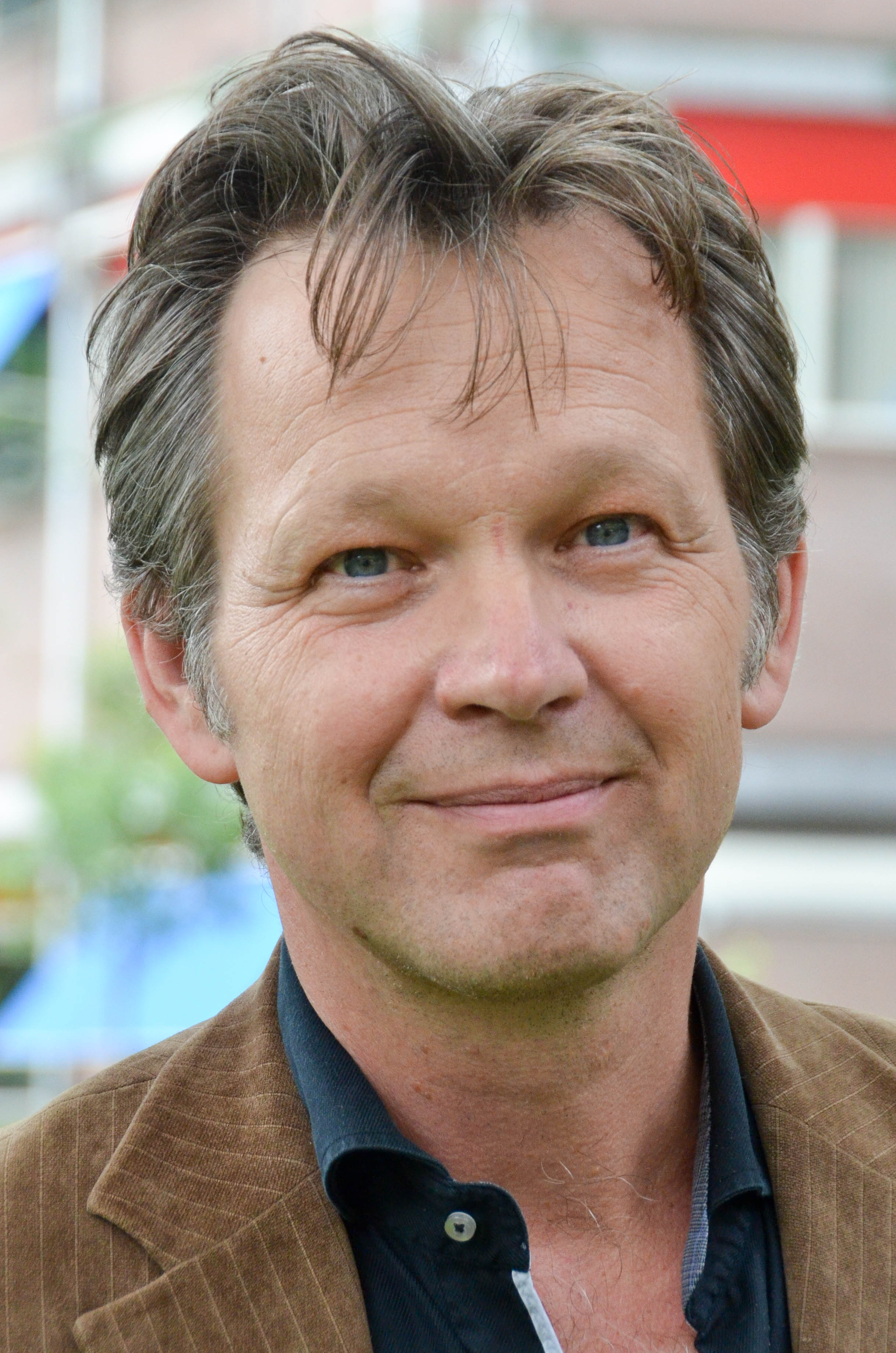
Stan Bentvelsen

Stan C.M. Bentvelsen (born 1965) is a Dutch experimental particle physicist and Professor of Large Hadron Collider Physics at the University of Amsterdam. He served as director of the Dutch National Institute for Subatomic Physics (Nikhef) from 2014 to 2024. His scientific career has focused on experimental high-energy physics, from studies of the internal structure of the proton to precision tests of the Standard Model and the physics of the Large Hadron Collider. He has been closely involved in the ATLAS experiment at CERN since its preparatory phase and served as programme leader for the Dutch ATLAS physics programme from 2004 to 2013. In this role, he coordinated the Dutch scientific contribution during the period leading to the discovery of the Higgs boson in 2012.

== Education ==
Bentvelsen began studying physics at the Vrije Universiteit Amsterdam in 1983. After completing his first year, he spent a year studying philosophy at the University of Amsterdam before continuing his studies in theoretical physics there. He graduated in 1989, with graduation research on cosmological scalar fields. He subsequently moved into experimental particle physics for his doctoral research at the University of Amsterdam, conducting his research with the ZEUS experiment at DESY in Hamburg. He received his PhD cum laude from the University of Amsterdam in 1994.

== Research ==
Bentvelsen's early research focused on the internal structure of the proton. As a member of the ZEUS collaboration at DESY, he participated in the first physics programme of the HERA electron-proton collider, using deep inelastic scattering to study the quark and gluon structure of the proton. During this period, he developed the double-angle method, a technique for reconstructing the kinematics of deep inelastic scattering events from angular measurements. The method was used in measurements of proton structure functions at HERA.

After completing his doctorate, Bentvelsen joined CERN, where he worked on the OPAL experiment at the Large Electron-Positron Collider (LEP). His research included studies of quantum chromodynamics and precision measurements of electroweak interactions. Towards the end of his time at CERN, he joined the ATLAS experiment, contributing to preparations for the physics programme of the Large Hadron Collider.

After returning to the Netherlands in 2000, Bentvelsen continued his research with the ATLAS experiment at Nikhef and the University of Amsterdam. His research focused on the physics of proton-proton collisions at the LHC and on tests of the Standard Model. From 2004 to 2013, he served as programme leader for the Dutch ATLAS physics programme, coordinating the scientific activities of the Dutch groups during the commissioning and first years of operation of the LHC. This period included the ATLAS searches for the Higgs boson and its discovery in 2012.

== Career ==
Bentvelsen joined CERN in 1994 as a research fellow and became a staff scientist in 1996. In 2000 he returned to the Netherlands to take up a senior research position at Nikhef. In 2004 he was appointed Professor of Large Hadron Collider Physics at the University of Amsterdam, where he also served as director of the Institute of High Energy Physics from 2004 to 2014.

Bentvelsen became director of Nikhef in December 2014 and served two five-year terms, until 2024. As director, he was responsible for the scientific strategy and overall management of the institute and the Nikhef partnership with Dutch universities. During his tenure, the University of Groningen and Maastricht University joined the partnership, extending the national collaboration in particle and astroparticle physics. Alongside Nikhef's continuing involvement in CERN's collider programme, the institute further developed its activities in areas including neutrino physics, dark matter searches and gravitational-wave science.

During his directorship of Nikhef, Bentvelsen became increasingly involved in gravitational-wave science. Following the first direct detection of gravitational waves in 2015, Nikhef expanded its activities in this field and joined the European Gravitational Observatory (EGO) and Virgo collaboration in 2019. Together with Maastricht University and regional partners, Nikhef also became involved in preparations for the Einstein Telescope, including the establishment of the ETpathfinder research facility in Maastricht.

Bentvelsen subsequently became involved in the European and Dutch preparations for the Einstein Telescope. Following its inclusion on the ESFRI Roadmap in 2021, the Netherlands established a national programme to investigate the feasibility of hosting the observatory in the Euregio Meuse-Rhine. In 2022, Bentvelsen helped establish the Einstein Telescope EMR Project Office, where he served as scientific director. In February 2025, he was appointed Chief Science Officer (CSO) of Einstein Telescope Netherlands (ET-NL), with responsibility for the scientific part of the bid book for the Einstein Telescope.

== Recognition and advisory roles ==
In 2013, Bentvelsen and former Nikhef director Frank Linde jointly received the Physica Prize of the Netherlands Physical Society (NNV) for their contributions to the discovery of the Higgs boson with the ATLAS experiment. In 2025, Bentvelsen was appointed a member of the Council of the UK Science and Technology Facilities Council (STFC).

== Public engagement ==
Bentvelsen has also been active in communicating particle physics to a wider audience. He appeared with Peter Higgs in the documentary Higgs - into the heart of imagination, which followed the Dutch research group at CERN during the preparations for the LHC and the search for the Higgs boson. In 2022, he co-authored the popular science book Het eiland dat Higgs heet with science writer Martijn van Calmthout.
