= Jos Engelen =

Dutch physicist (born 1950)

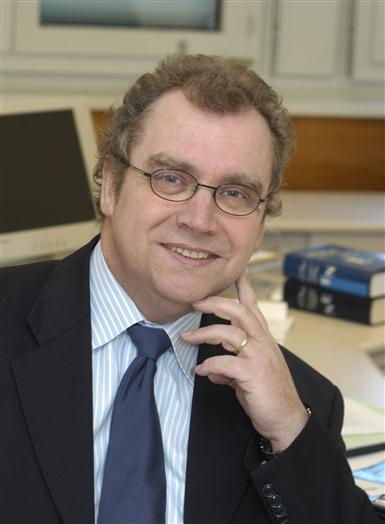
Jos Engelen (December 2003).

Joseph Johannus Engelen (born 6 July 1950 in Maasniel), a Dutch physicist, was Chairman of the Netherlands Organisation for Scientific Research (NWO) from January 2009 to October 2016.

== Career ==
Jos Engelen studied physics at the Radboud University Nijmegen where he obtained an MSc degree in 1973. After graduation he worked at the same university as a researcher and lecturer, and gained also his PhD degree here in 1979. From 1979 to 1985 Engelen worked at CERN, the European research centre for particle physics in Geneva, Switzerland.

In 1985, he accepted a position at the Dutch National Institute for Subatomic Physics, Nikhef. He became professor of Experimental Physics at the University of Amsterdam in 1987. At CERN and DESY (Hamburg, Germany) he carried out experiments in the area of the strong interaction, hard photoproduction and dispersion in deep inelastic collisions. He also developed initiatives for research in the field of astroparticle physics.

From 2001 to 2003 Engelen was director of Nikhef and in 2004 he became the Chief Scientific Officer of CERN, a position he held until 2008. His responsibilities included overseeing the construction and commissioning of the new Large Hadron Collider (LHC) particle accelerator and the associated experimental set-ups. From 2007 to 2008 Engelen was chair of ASTRON, the NWO research institute for radio astronomy.
