= Wim Mook =

Dutch isotope physicist

Willem Gerrit "Wim" Mook (10 July 1932 – 24 January 2016) was a Dutch isotope physicist.

== Life and career ==
Mook was born on 10 July 1932 in Groningen. He obtained his doctorate at the University of Groningen in 1968, with a dissertation titled: Geochemistry of the stable carbon and oxygen isotopes of natural waters in the Netherlands. He was a lecturer of isotope physics at the same university between 1975 and 1979. Starting the next year he was professor of isotope physics, until his retirement in 1997. From 1986 he also served as professor at the VU University Amsterdam.

Mook was director of the Royal Netherlands Institute of Sea Research (NIOZ) from 1990 to 1996.

In 1985 he became a member of the Royal Netherlands Academy of Arts and Sciences.

He died on 24 January 2016 in Haren.
