= Stan Gielen =

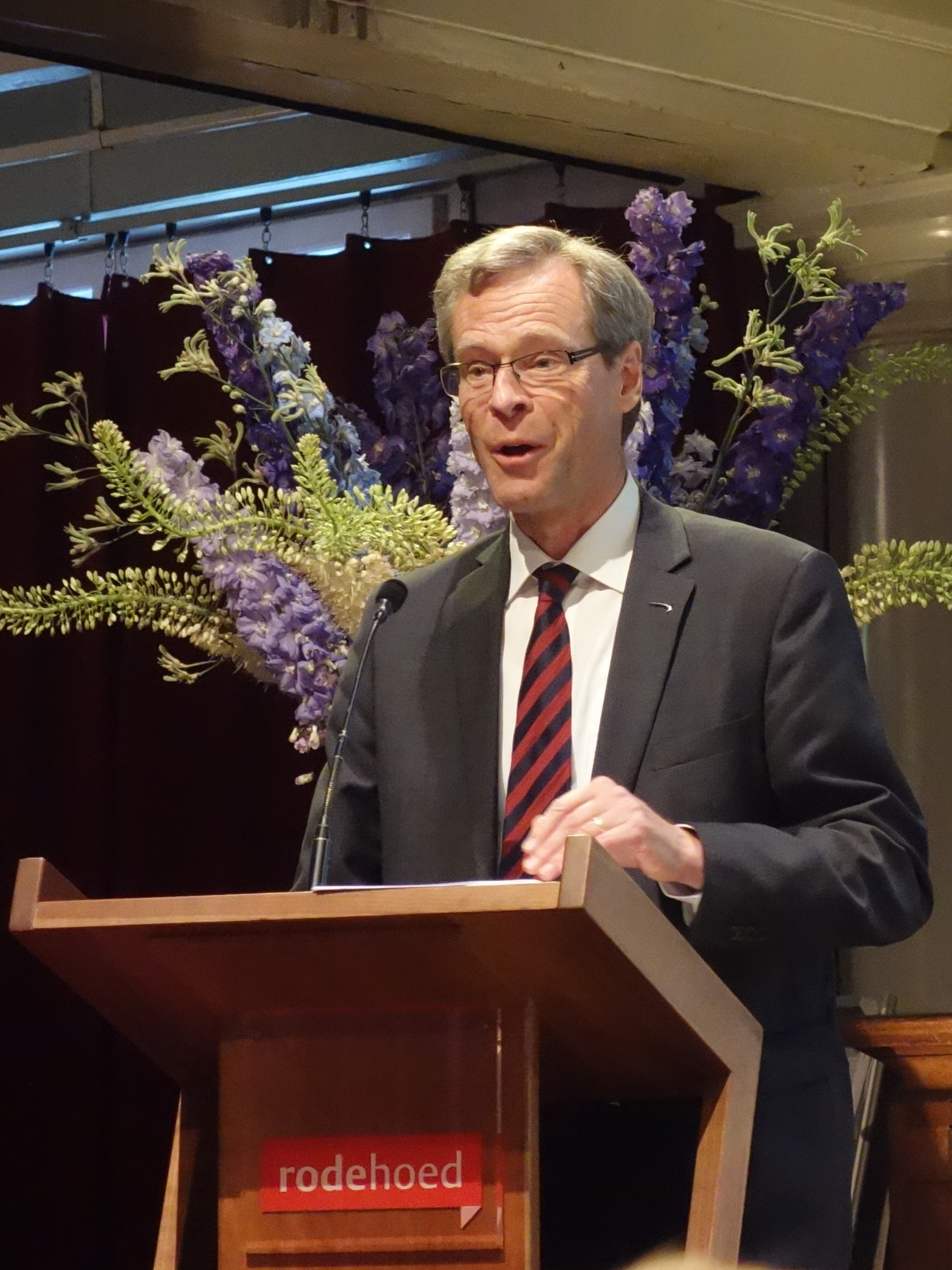
Dutch physicist Stan Gielen (Amsterdam, June 2017)

Stan Gielen (born 19 December 1952), is a Dutch biophysicist and professor at Radboud University Nijmegen. From October 2016 to April 2021, Gielen was the chairman of the Netherlands Organization for Scientific Research (NWO).

== Career ==
Gielen was born on 19 December 1952 in Breda. He studied experimental physics in Nijmegen, Netherlands and graduated in 1976 and earned his PhD in 1980. Later, Gielen worked at Utrecht University, UCLA and Northwestern University. In 1988, he returned to Nijmegen, where he became a professor and head of the biophysics department. Gielen has supervised more than 50 doctoral dissertations.

Gielen's research centers on sensorimotor processes, brain-computer interfacing, and artificial intelligence applications. Since 2010, he has served as the Dean of the Faculty of Science at Radboud University in Nijmegen. Gielen was elected a member of the Royal Netherlands Academy of Arts and Sciences in 2010.

In October 2016, he was appointed chairman of the Netherlands Organization for Scientific Research, a position he held until April 1, 2021.

== Selected publications ==
- J.J. Tramper & S.C.A.M. Gielen: 'Visuomotor coordination is different for different directions in three-dimensional space'. In: Journal of Neuroscience, vol. 31, iss. 21, (2011), pp. 7857-7866
- S.C.A.M. Gielen: De neuronale integratie van waarnemen en bewegen. Nijmegen, Quickprint, 1988. Inaugurele rede Nijmegen. ISBN 90-90-02590-1
- Constantinus Cornelis Adrianus Maria Gielen: Spatio-temporal and chromatic properties of visual neurones in the rhesus monkey geniculate nucleus. Meppel, Krips Repro, 1980. (Proefschrift Nijmegen)
