= Amsterdam Science Park railway station =

Railway station in Amsterdam, Netherlands

Amsterdam Science Park
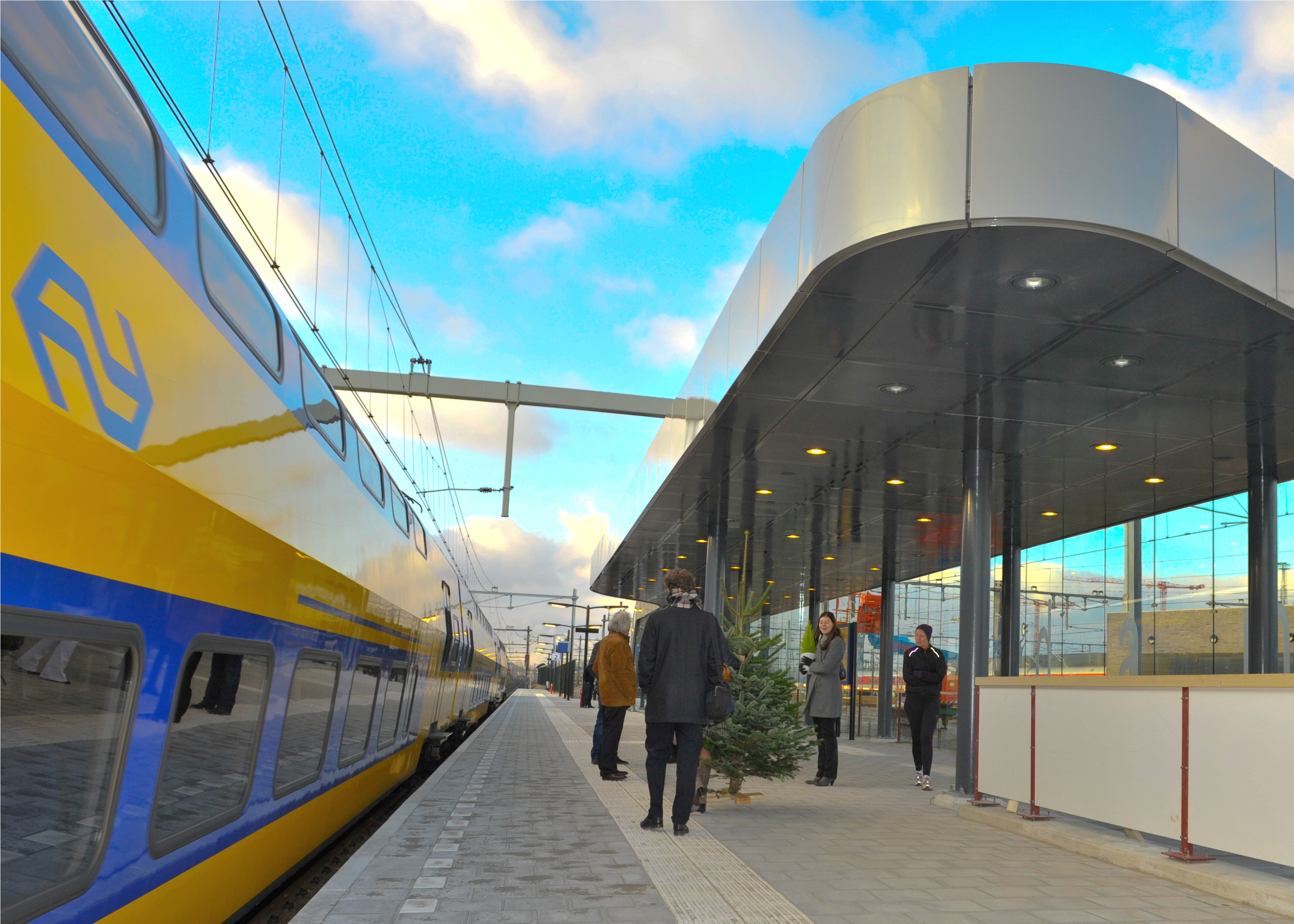
- The train station on the day of the official opening

General information
- Location: Netherlands
- Coordinates: 52°21′09″N 4°56′55″E
- Operator: NS (2009–present)
- Line: Amsterdam–Zutphen railway
- Platforms: 2

Other information
- Station code: Assp

History
- Opened: 13 December 2009

Services
Preceding station	Nederlandse Spoorwegen	Following station
Amsterdam Muiderpoort towards Amsterdam Centraal	NS Sprinter 4600 until 20:00	Diemen towards Almere Oostvaarders
Amsterdam Muiderpoort towards Amsterdam Centraal	NS Sprinter 5800	Diemen towards Amersfoort Vathorst
Location
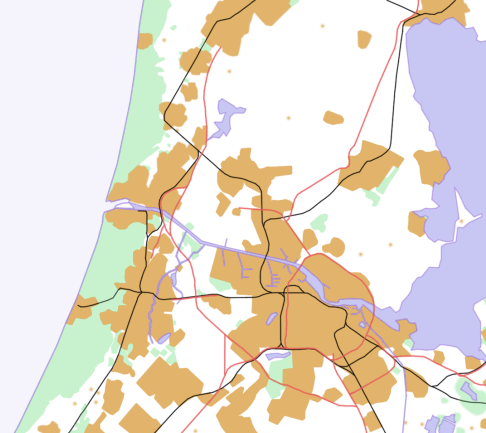
- Location within Northern Randstad Location within Netherlands

Amsterdam Science Park is a railway station in the borough Amsterdam-Oost in Amsterdam, Netherlands. The station lies on the Amsterdam–Zutphen railway between the railway stations Amsterdam Muiderpoort and Diemen. The station serves the Science Park Amsterdam and the Watergraafsmeer, as well as Amsterdam University College and the Science Park campus of the University of Amsterdam. The construction of the station started in June 2009 and it was opened on 13 December 2009 by Amsterdam Mayor Job Cohen.

== Train services ==
The following trains operated by NS are serving the station:

- 2× per hour local Sprinter service Amsterdam – Weesp – Almere – Lelystad – Zwolle
- 2× per hour local Sprinter service Hoofddorp – Schiphol – Amsterdam – Hilversum – Amersfoort

== Bus services ==
The following bus service is operated by GVB and stops at the railway station:

- Line 40: Station Amstel – Watergraafsmeer – Science Park – Muiderpoort
