= Institute for Biodiversity and Ecosystem Dynamics =

Dutch research institute

- Instituut voor Biodiversiteit en Ecosysteem Dynamica
- Established: 2000
- Director: Annemarie P. van Wezel
- Location: Amsterdam, The Netherlands
- Website: http://www.science.uva.nl/ibed

The Institute for Biodiversity and Ecosystem Dynamics (IBED) is one of the ten research institutes of the Faculty of Science of the Universiteit van Amsterdam. IBED employs more than 100 researchers, with PhD students and Postdocs forming a majority, and 30 supporting staff. The total annual budget is around 10 m€, of which more than 40 per cent comes from external grants and contracts. The main output consists of publications in peer reviewed journals and books (on average 220 per year). Each year around 15 PhD students defend their thesis and obtain their degree from the Universiteit van Amsterdam. The institute is managed by a general director appointed by the Dean of the Faculty for a period of five years, assisted by a business manager.

== Mission statement ==
The mission of the Institute for Biodiversity and Ecosystem Dynamics is to increase our insights in the functioning and biodiversity of ecosystems in all their complexity. Knowledge of the interactions between living organisms and processes in their physical and chemical environment is essential for a better understanding of the dynamics of ecosystems at different temporal and spatial scales.

== Organization of IBED Research ==
IBED research is organized in the following three themes:

=== Theme I: Biodiversity and Evolution ===
The main question of Theme I research is how patterns in biodiversity can be explained from underlying processes: speciation and extinction, dispersal and the (dis)appearance of geographical barriers, reproductive isolation and hybridisation of taxa. Modern reconstructions of the history of life on earth rely heavily on analyses of DNA data that contain the footprints of the past. Research related to human-made effects on biodiversity includes the identification of endangered biodiversity hotspots affected by global change, potential risks of an escape of transgenes from crops to wild species, and the consequences of habitat fragmentation for the viability and genetic diversity of populations and species.

=== Theme II: Geo-ecology ===
Research in Theme II concentrates on the physical and chemical properties of the environment, and how these affect the living organisms in an ecosystem. The spatial and temporal scale ranges from fluxes at the molecular level to the reconstruction of Quaternary climate change in different continents. Research related to human effects on ecosystems includes the fate of chemical pollutants in the system, CO_{2} sequestering, nutrient fluxes and soil fertility and the effects of land use on erosion and desertification.

=== Theme III: Community Dynamics ===
Research in Theme III aims to understand the dynamics of natural communities given the diversity and behaviour of the organisms present in the system. Individual variation - for instance in developmental stage or in genetic response - can have a major impact on the stability of complex biological systems. The research of Theme III has many applications: control of pests and plagues, prevention of toxic algal blooms, managing fish populations by harvesting and restocking, and control of turbidity in aquatic systems.

== Organization of IBED Education ==
IBED is closely involved in several BSc and MSc programmes of the Universiteit van Amsterdam. Especially the MSc programmes that are taught in English are highly integrated within the research of IBED.

== Notable staff ==
- Prof. Corina Brussaard
