= Nikhef =

Dutch particle physics research institute

Coordinates: 52°21′21″N 4°57′04″E

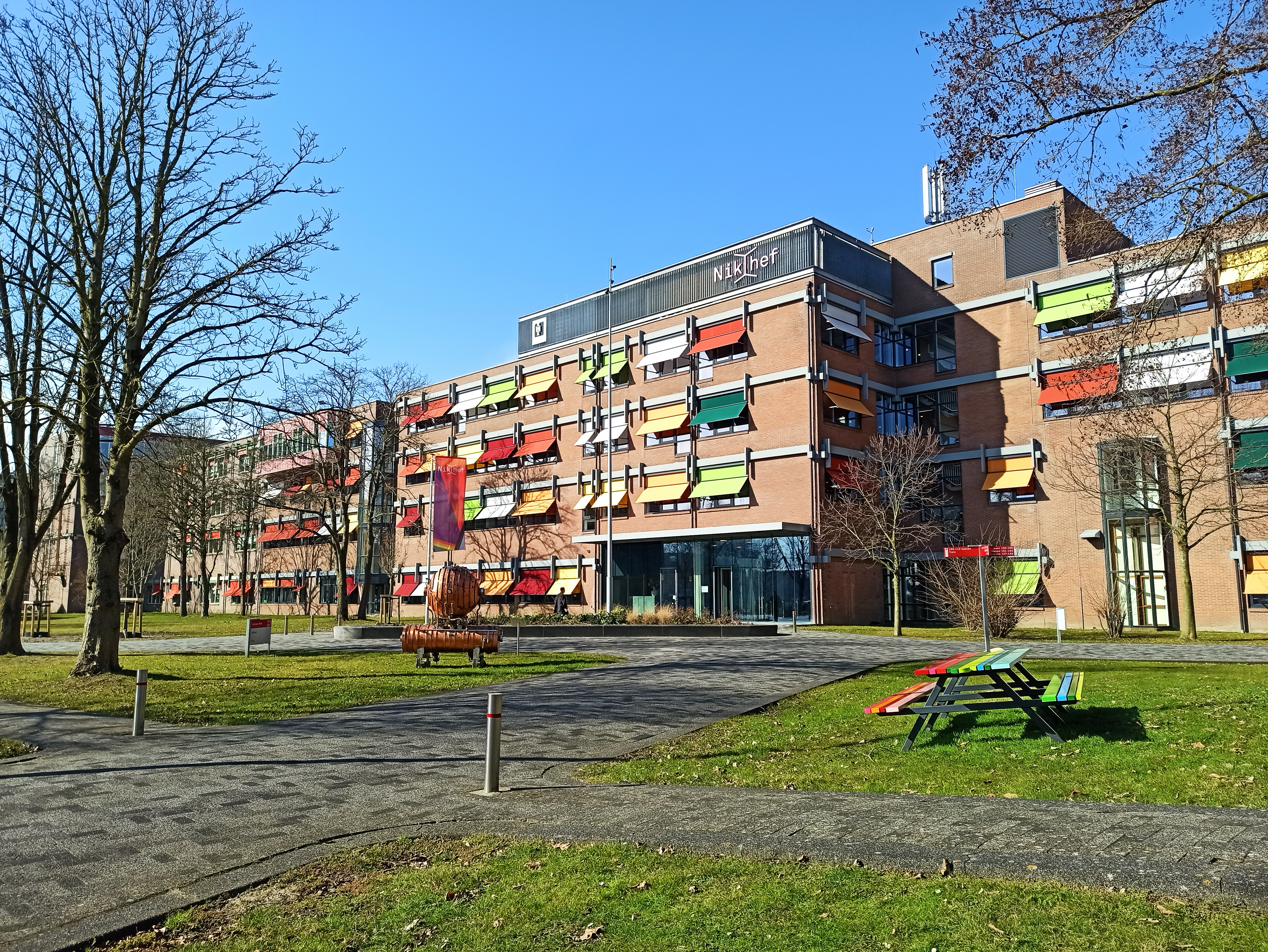
- Nikhef
- Formation: June 17, 1975; 51 years ago
- Headquarters: Science Park Amsterdam, Watergraafsmeer, Amsterdam, the Netherlands
- Official languages: Dutch and English
- Website: www.nikhef.nl

Nikhef is the Dutch National Institute for Subatomic Physics that performs research in particle physics and astroparticle physics. Amongst others, it is a research partner of the CERN intergovernmental organization in Switzerland and a member of the European Gravitational Observatory. Nikhef is a collaboration between the Dutch Research Council (NWO), University of Amsterdam, Vrije Universiteit Amsterdam, Radboud University, University of Groningen, Maastricht University and Utrecht University. The current director is Jorgen D'Hondt. Nikhef is located at the Amsterdam Science Park in Watergraafsmeer in the Netherlands.

NIKHEF is an acronym for Nationaal Instituut voor Kernfysica en Hoge-Energiefysica (National Institute for Nuclear and High energy physics). This acronym is no longer used and the name was changed to Nationaal instituut voor subatomaire fysica (National Institute for Subatomic Physics). The name Nikhef is preserved to maintain name recognition (now with only the N capitalised).

It also was the host of the third website in the world, starting in February 1992. Nikhef is also one of the eight colocations of the Amsterdam Internet Exchange.

== Directors ==
The following professors were directors:

- Jos Engelen 2002-2003 (Nikhef)
- Karel Gaemers 2004 (interim Nikhef)
- Frank Linde 2005-2014 (Nikhef)
- Stan Bentvelsen 2014-2024 (Nikhef) since 1 December 2014
- Jorgen D'Hondt 2024- (Nikhef)
