= Amsterdam Muiderpoort railway station =

Railway station in Amsterdam, Netherlands

Amsterdam Muiderpoort
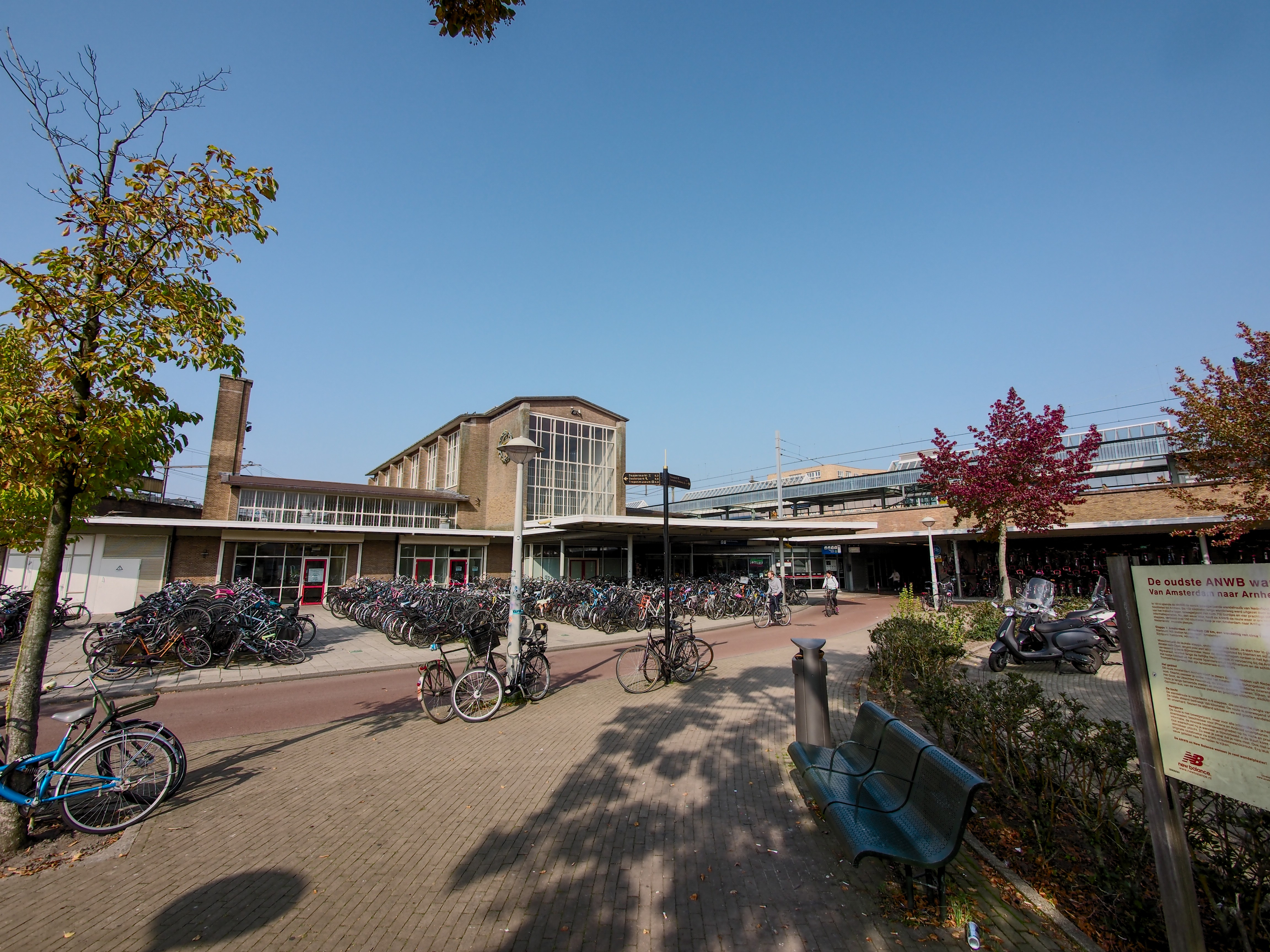
- Muiderpoort station seen from Oosterspoorplein

General information
- Location: Netherlands
- Coordinates: 52°21′39″N 4°55′52″E
- Lines: Amsterdam–Arnhem railway Amsterdam–Zutphen railway

Other information
- Station code: Asdm

History
- Opened: 1896

Services
Preceding station	Nederlandse Spoorwegen	Following station
Amsterdam Centraal towards Uitgeest	NS Sprinter 4000	Amsterdam Amstel towards Rotterdam Centraal
Amsterdam Centraal Terminus	NS Sprinter 4600 Not after 20:00	Amsterdam Science Park towards Almere Oostvaarders
Amsterdam Centraal Terminus	NS Sprinter 5800	Amsterdam Science Park towards Amersfoort Vathorst
Amsterdam Centraal towards Uitgeest	NS Sprinter 7400 Peak hours only	Amsterdam Amstel towards Driebergen-Zeist
Location
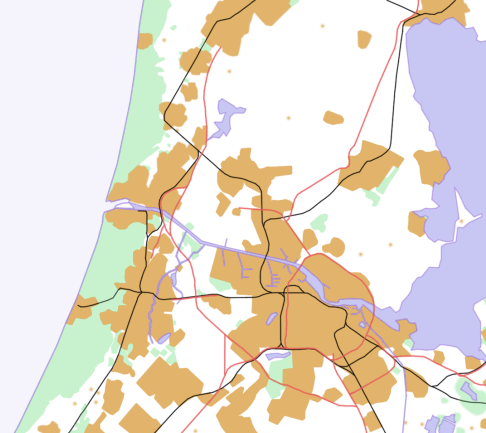
- Location within Northern Randstad Location within Netherlands

Amsterdam Muiderpoort is a railway station in the east of Amsterdam. It was reopened on 15 October 1939 after being first opened in 1896. It is located 4 km southeast of Amsterdam Centraal. At this station the Amsterdam–Arnhem railway and the Amsterdam–Zutphen railway split, with the two parts of the station separated (keilbahnhof). The western part is the Amsterdam Centraal to Utrecht Centraal line. The eastern part is the Amsterdam Centraal to Amersfoort Centraal line. The station is operated by the Nederlandse Spoorwegen.

== Early Stations ==
The first station in the area was a small structure named Stopplaats St. Anthoniedijk (St. Anthoniedijk Stop), which was in use from 1882 until 1896. It was situated west of the current station, before the point where the line to Weesperpoort station and on to Utrecht branched off from the Oosterspoorweg towards Hilversum and Amersfoort. In 1896, a new, wooden station was constructed east of the split at the Pontanusstraat; it only contained platforms along the line to Hilversum. The tracks of the connecting line to Weesperpoort station were not along a platform.

Although the station was named after the Muiderpoort (Muiden gate), the station was located just under a kilometre east of it. The station then had one island platform that passengers could reach through an overhead walkway. On the platform were two simple wooden buildings connected by a short platform roof. In 1907, three additional buildings with waiting rooms and bathrooms were placed on the platform, one of the original buildings was enlarged and a longer platform roof was added. In the late 1930s, the tracks on the east side of Amsterdam were raised under the name Spoorwegwerken Oost (Eastern Railway Works). To make room for the works, the old Muiderpoort Station was closed and demolished in 1937.

== Present Station ==
The current, raised station was built under the direction of architect Herman Schelling and architect Johannes Leupen of the Municipality of Amsterdam and opened on 15 October 1939. The new station was built as part of the Railway Works East (Spoorwegwerken Oost), which included placing the railway lines between Central Station and Amstel Station and to Weesp and Hilversum on embankments and crossed all streets using viaducts. Again, this station is not situated near the historical Muiden Gate but more than one kilometre to its east.

Diagram of a Keilbahnhof (red: station building, gray: platforms)

The station contains two separate platforms, one on the eastern side to serve the Oosterspoorweg to Weesp and Hilversum, another on the western side for connections towards Weesp and on to Utrecht. Known as a Keilbahnhof (Vorkstation in Dutch) this is a fairly unorthodox setup, and Muiderpoort is its only representative in the Netherlands. The most famous example of this station type is probably Zwickau Hauptbahnhof in Germany.

Two pedestrian tunnels ran from the central hall, where the ticket offices were located, to the platforms. In the late 1990s, the station underwent extensive renovation, after which the hall and tunnels were leased to businesses. The platforms became directly accessible from the street. Around 2002, the NS closed the last ticket office. In practice, most passengers enter the station from the Wijttenbachstraat, a busy street behind the station that also offers connections to trams and buses.

The former Signal House, the highest part of the station complex was designated a national monument in 2003 and occasionally hosts events. The other buildings of the complex, including some service houses, became municipal monuments in 2014. A stained-glass window by Heinrich Campendonk was installed in the north wall of the building when it was built in 1939. It depicts bird migration, a common allegory for travel at the time.

Some twenty security cameras have been installed at the station. Gates with turnstiles for use with the public transport chip card were installed in mid-2008. The station contains a kiosk for food, drinks and printing. The station platforms have been made accessible to passengers through lifts.

== Deportations during World War II ==
During World War II, the station acted as a boarding point for Jews who were deported from the Hollandsche Schouwburg assembly point to Westerbork transit camp. A commemorative plaque has been placed on the Oosterspoorplein in front of the station.

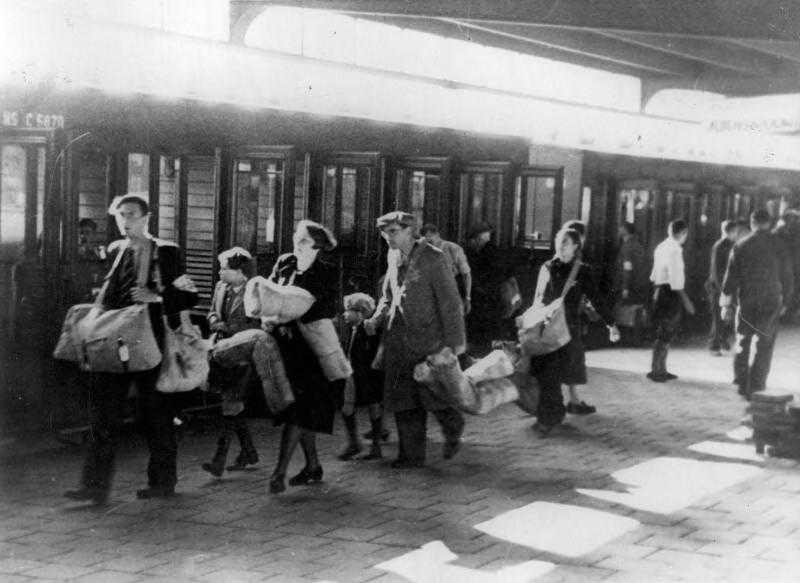
Jewish citizens being deported on the platform of Muiderpoort Station.

== Train services ==
As of 11 December 2016, the following train services call at this station:

- 2x per hour local service (Sprinter) The Hague - Leiden - Schiphol - Amsterdam - Weesp - Almere - Lelystad - Zwolle
- 2x per hour local service (Sprinter) Uitgeest - Amsterdam - Breukelen - Woerden - Rotterdam
- 2x per hour local service (Sprinter) Hoofddorp - Schiphol - Amsterdam - Hilversum - Amersfoort Vathorst
- 2x per hour local service (Sprinter) Amsterdam - Breukelen - Utrecht - Rhenen

== Tram services ==
Muiderpoortstation

Services
Preceding station	Amsterdam Tram	Following station
Terminus	Line 1	Dapperstraat towards Osdorp de Aker
Molukkenstraat towards Flevopark	Line 3	Dapperstraat towards Zoutkeetsgracht
Molukkenstraat One-way operation	Line 14	Linneausstraat towards Centraal Station
Location

These services are operated by GVB.

- 1 Muiderpoortstation - Weesperplein - Leidseplein - Overtoom - Surinameplein - Station Lelylaan - Osdorp de Aker
- 3 Zoutkeetsgracht - Marnixplein - Museumplein - De Pijp - Muiderpoortstation - Flevopark

== Bus services ==
These services are operated by GVB.

- 22 Muiderpoortstation - Indische Buurt - Centraal Station - Spaarndammerbuurt - Station Sloterdijk
- 37 Amstelstation - Muiderpoortstation - Flevopark - Zuiderzeeweg - Nieuwendam - Station Noord
- 40 Muiderpoortstation - Science Park - Watergraafsmeer - Amstelstation
- 41 Muiderpoortstation - Watergraafsmeer - Duivendrecht - Bijlmermeer - Station Holendrecht

=== Gallery ===
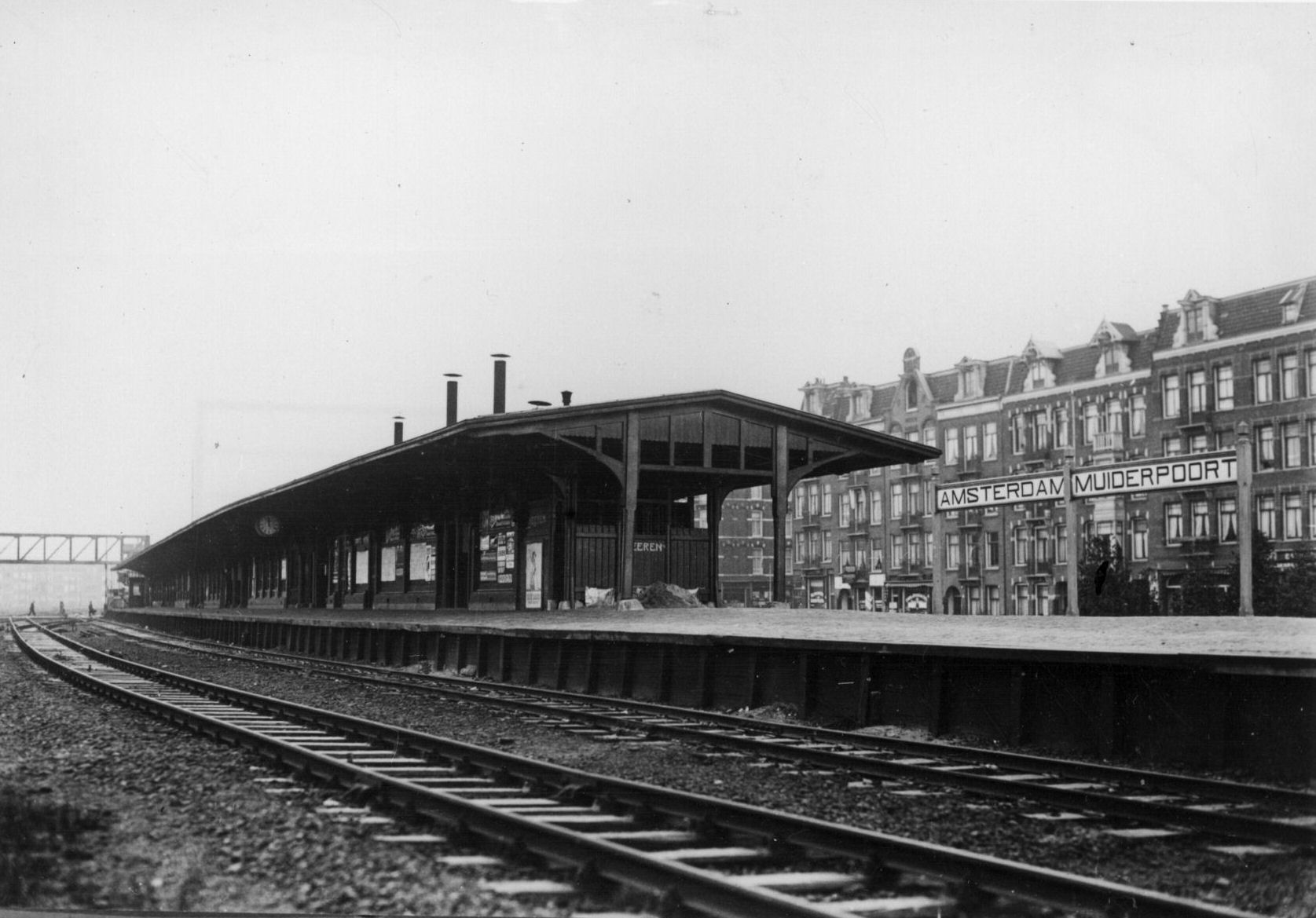
First Muiderpoort Station, between 1910 and 1915.

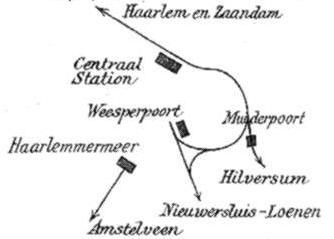
Situation of Amsterdam's railways, 1936.

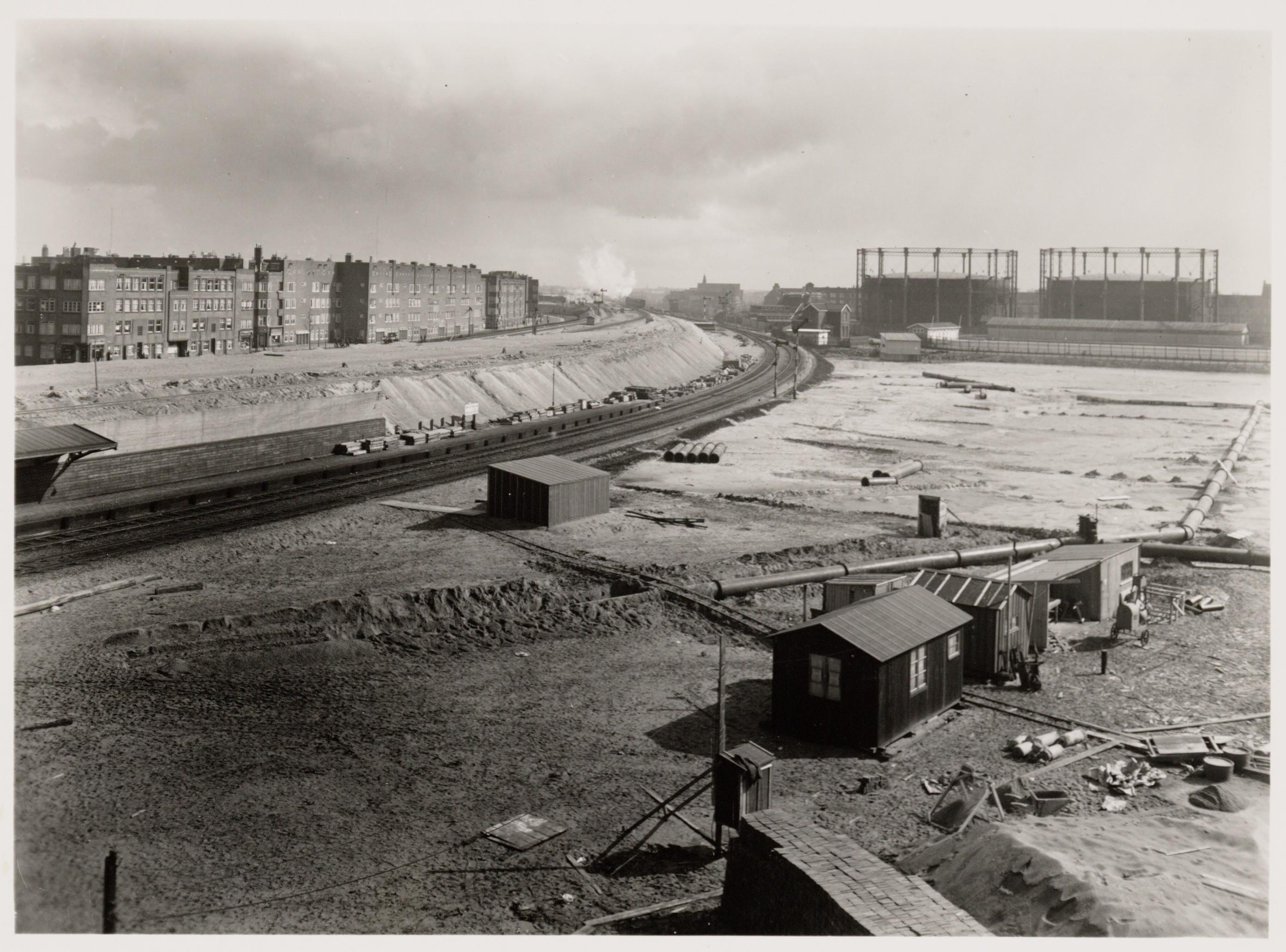
Embankment of the station under construction, 1937.

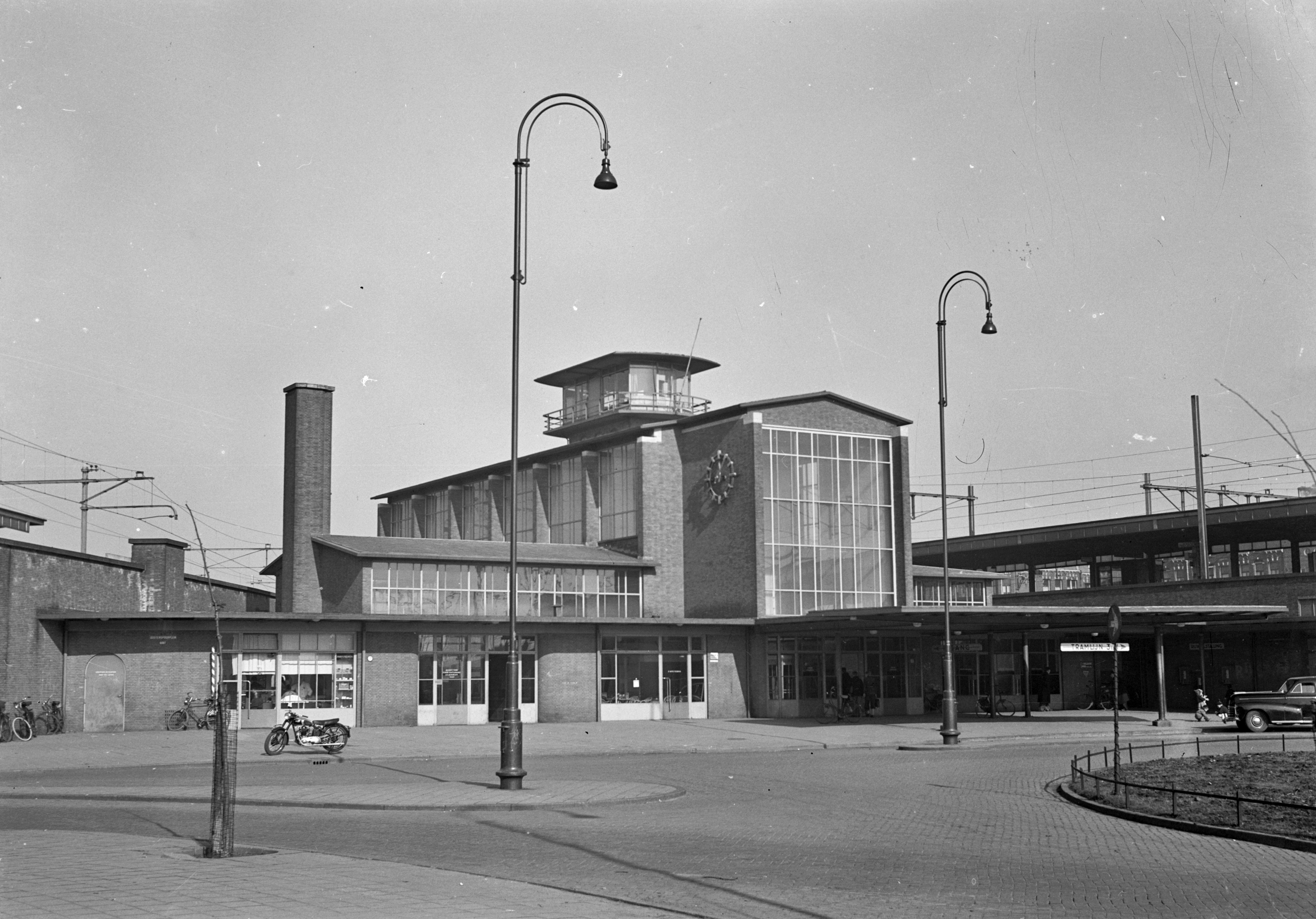
View of Muiderpoort Station from the Oosterspoorplein, 1953.

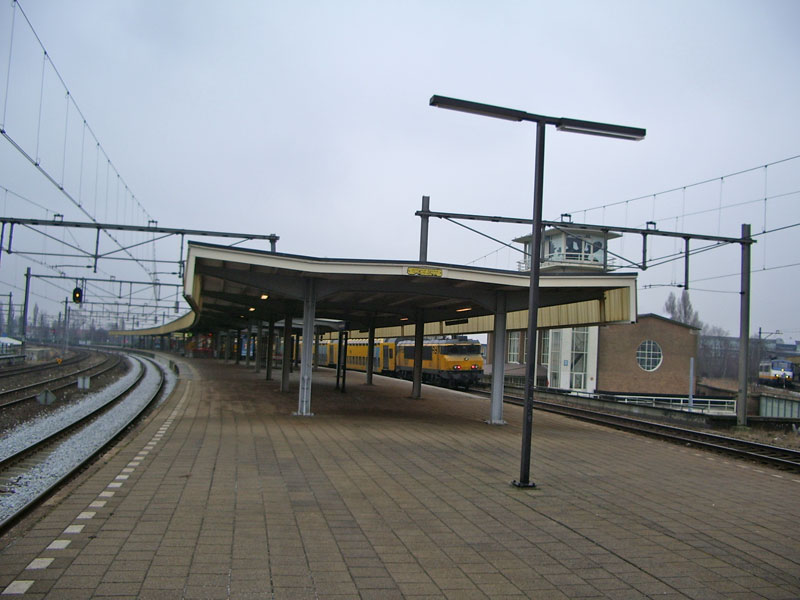
Platform level looking southwards, with a train in the direction of Weesp (centre) and Sprinter from the direction of Utrecht on the extreme right of the image.

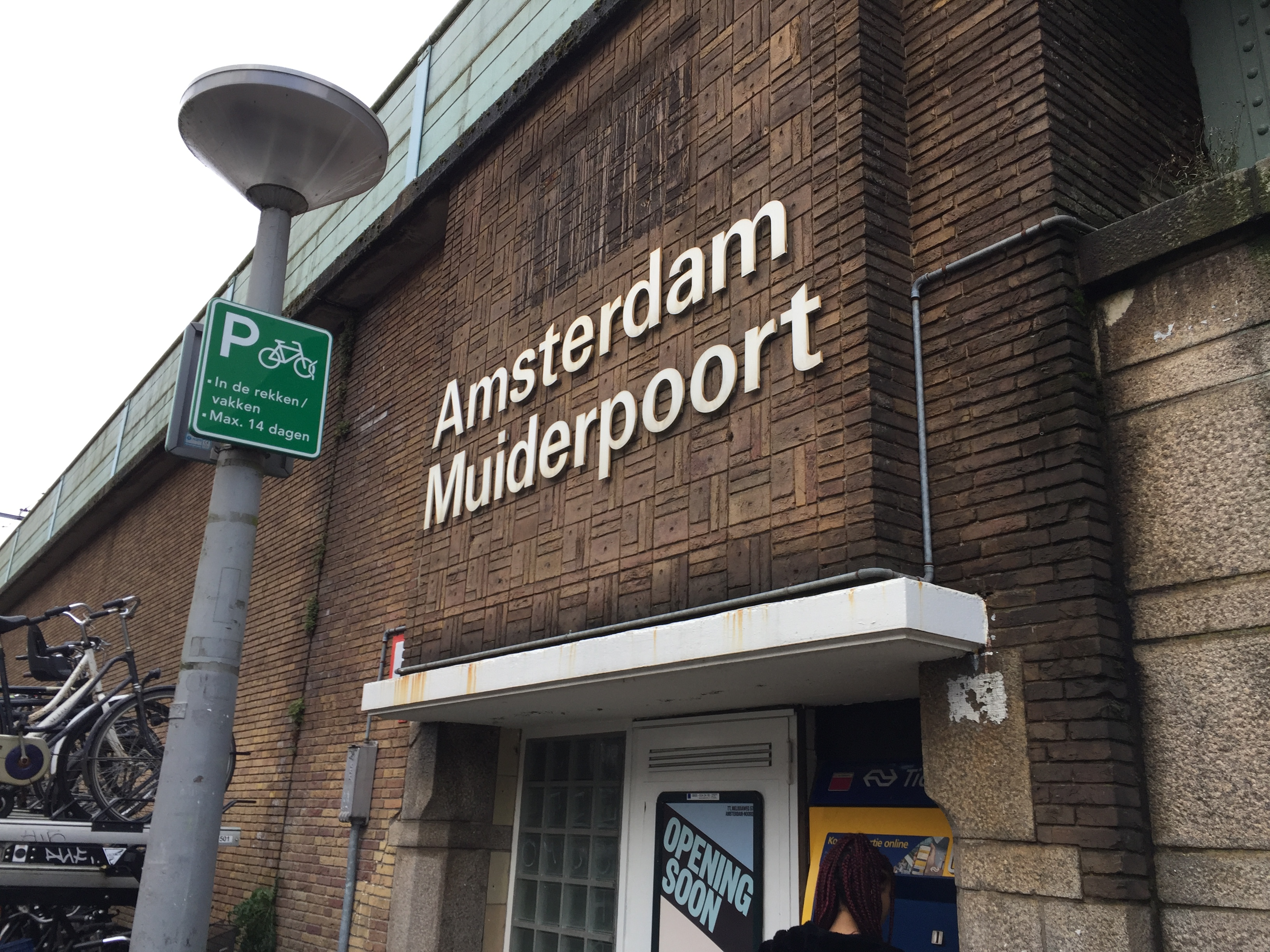
Entrance to Muiderpoort station from the Wijttenbachstraat.

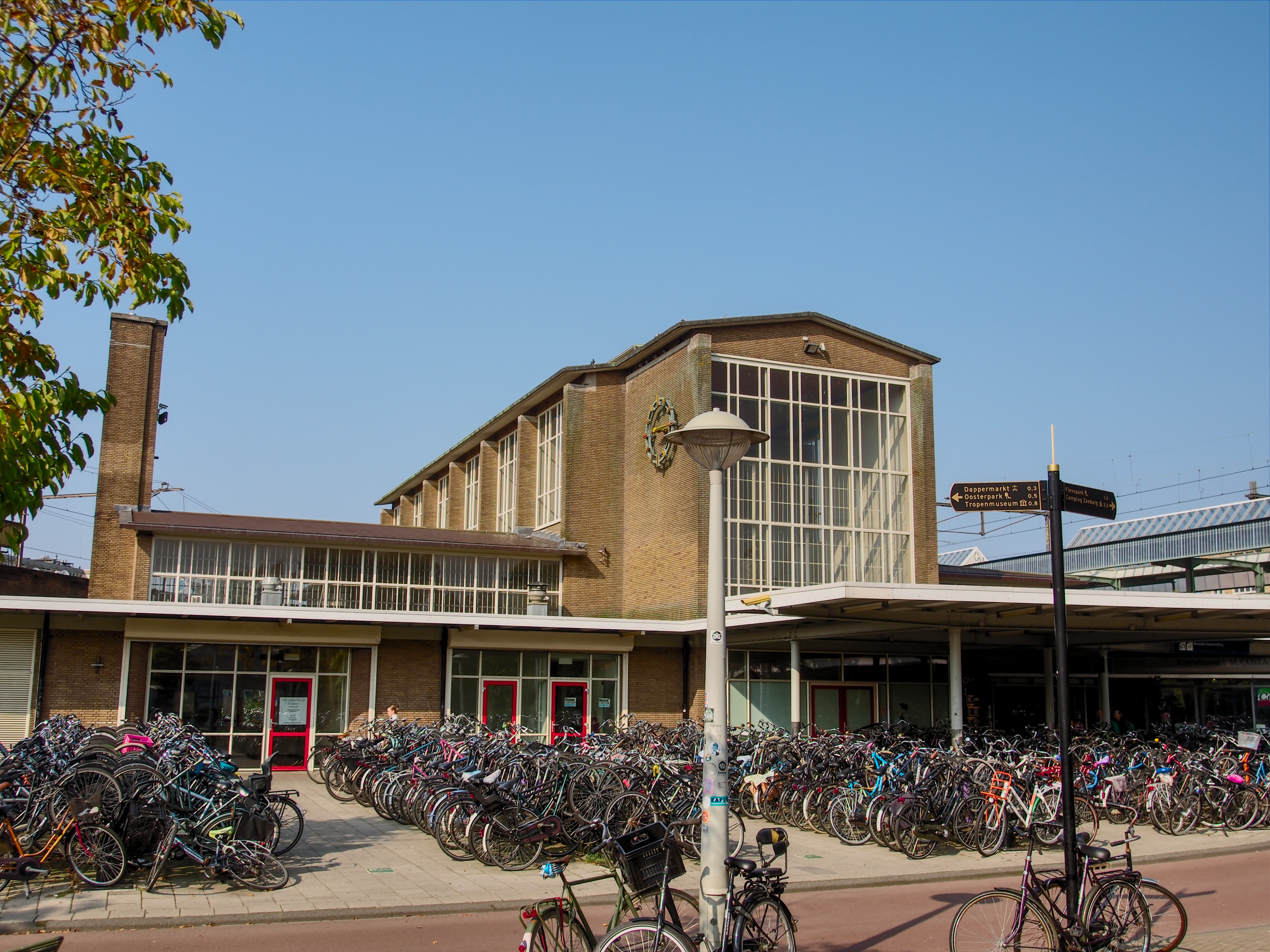
Entrance to the station from street level, from the Oosterspoorplein.
