= Royal Netherlands Institute for Sea Research =

Dutch national oceanographic institute

The Royal Netherlands Institute for Sea Research, also known as NIOZ, in Dutch the Nederlands Instituut voor Onderzoek der Zee, is the Dutch national oceanographic institute. It is located on the island of Texel, and in Yerseke, in the Netherlands. The institute was founded in 1876 as the Zoological Station and in 1960 it was renamed to its current name. NIOZ carries out marine research in the waters of the Netherlands and overseas; it also plays a role in educating students, and it offers research facilities to marine scientists from the Netherlands and other countries worldwide. NIOZ has a longstanding collaboration with Utrecht University, for instance in an interdisciplinary Master’s programme Marine Sciences. NIOZ is part of the institutes organization of the Dutch Research Council (NWO).

Wim Mook was director of the institute from 1990 to 1996. Henk Brinkhuis was director from October 2011 until 1 November 2021, when he was succeeded by Han Dolman. In 2022, NIOZ had 337 employees.

== Fleet ==
The National Marine Facilities (NMF), a division of NIOZ, operates three research vessels, each with their specific area of operation. These vessels are the RV Pelagia, the RV Navicula and the RV Adriaen Coenen which replaced the RV Stern on 1 August 2022. The RV Navicula is scheduled to be replaced by the RV Wim Wolff in 2023. The RV Pelagia is also due to be replaced but on 14 April 2022 a Dutch court ruled that the original contract must be amended, resulting in a delay of the final tender for the RV Anna Weber-van Bosse.
