= Dutch Research Council =

National research council of the Netherlands

Coordinates: 52°5′0″N 4°19′0″E

- Abbreviation: NWO
- Formation: 1950; 76 years ago
- Purpose: Funding and coordinating scientific research in the Netherlands
- Headquarters: The Hague, Netherlands, Utrecht, Netherlands
- Chairman Governing Board: Marcel Levi
- Budget: €1.3 billion
- Website: www.nwo.nl/en

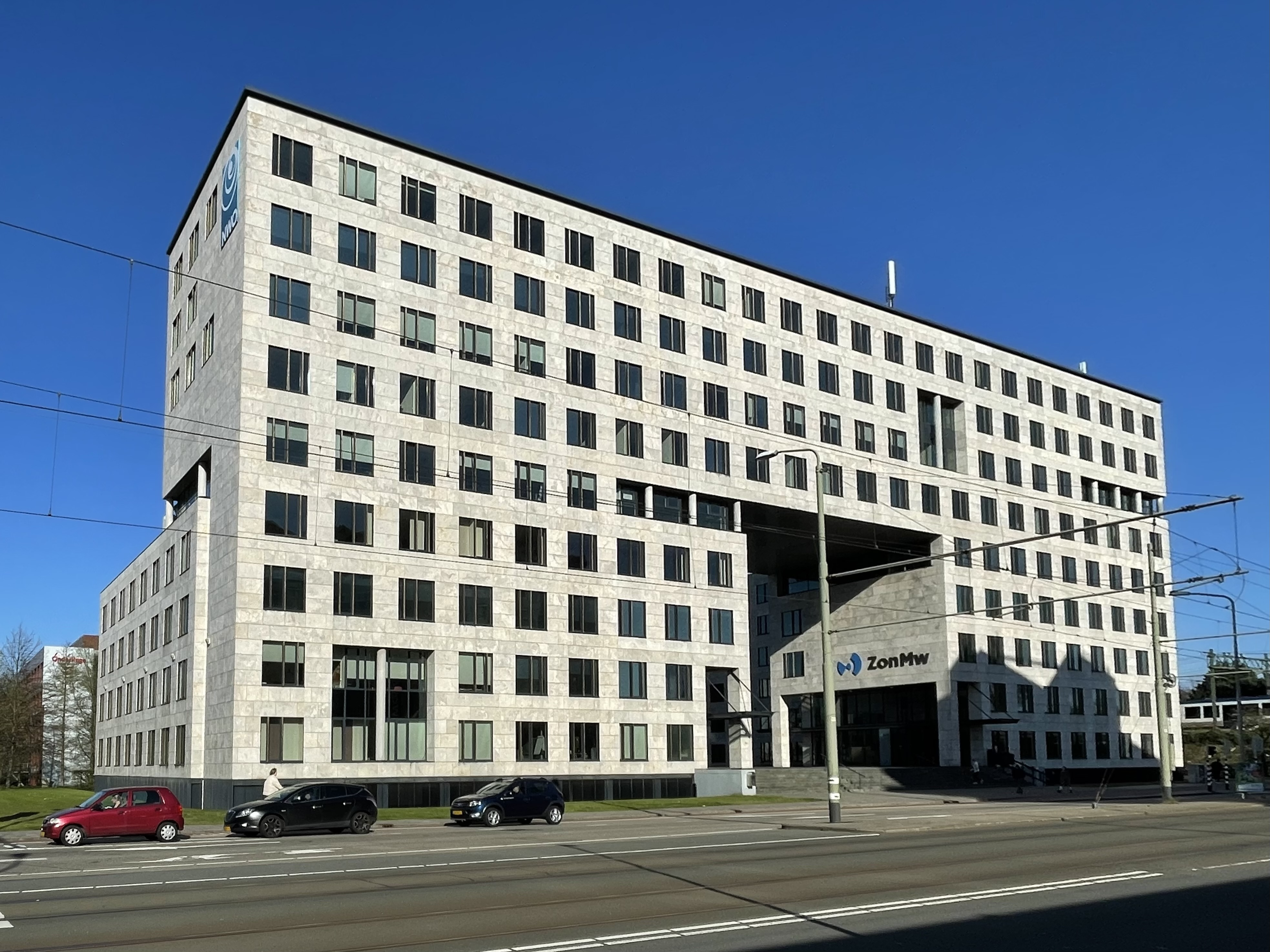
The NWO headquarters, The Hague

The Dutch Research Council (NWO, Dutch: Nederlandse Organisatie voor Wetenschappelijk Onderzoek) is the national research council of the Netherlands. NWO funds scientific research at Dutch universities and research institutes through grants and research programs. NWO is an independent administrative body (zelfstandig bestuursorgaan) operating under the responsibility of the Dutch Ministry of Education, Culture and Science.

NWO distributes its approximate annual budget of approximately 1.3 billion euros for scientific research and research infrastructure. In addition, NWO manages several research institutes and supports international scientific cooperation. Since April 2021, the president of NWO has been Marcel Levi. Former NWO presidents include Stan Gielen, Peter Nijkamp and Jos Engelen.

NWO also awards the annual Spinoza and Stevin Prizes, two of the highest scientific distinctions in The Netherlands.

== History ==
The council was established in 1950 as Nederlandse Organisatie voor Zuiver-Wetenschappelijk Onderzoek (ZWO). This organisation did not focus on applied research; the research organization TNO was established for that purpose. In 1988 ZWO was renamed as NWO and was given the broader mission. Like its predecessor, NWO is a public institution; its tasks and responsibilities are established in the NWO Act.

On 1 January 2018 the former FOM institutes AMOLF, ARCNL, DIFFER and Nikhef and the over 200 university workgroups from the former FOM projects merged with the other NWO institutes (NWO-I): ASTRON, CWI, NIOZ, NSCR and SRON.

NWO signed the Berlin Declaration on Open Access to Knowledge in the Sciences and Humanities in May 2005.

== NWO organisation ==
=== NWO Domains ===
NWO's core task is performed in the NWO domains, research institutes and regional bodies: encouraging quality and innovation in the sciences. The NWO domains organise the programmes and the research funding. Both the Executive Board and the NWO Domain Boards have the competence to allocate public funding for scientific research.

- NWO Domain Science (ENW)
- NWO Domain Applied and Engineering Sciences (AES)
- NWO Domain Social Sciences and Humanities (SSH)

Health Research and Development is managed by ZonMw. WOTRO Science for Global Development is a domain intersecting initiative.

=== NWO-I, Institutes Organisation of NWO ===
NWO-I, the Institutes Organisation of NWO, works closely with the NWO domains and encompasses 10 institutes. The office of NWO-I supports all institutes.

- AMOLF Institute for Atomic and Molecular Physics
- Advanced Research Center for Nanolithography (ARCNL)
- ASTRON Netherlands Institute for Radio Astronomy
- Centrum Wiskunde & Informatica (CWI)
- DIFFER (Dutch Institute for Fundamental Energy Research)
- HFML-FELIX (High Field Magnet Laboratory - Free Electron Laser for Infrared eXperiments)
- Nikhef Dutch National Institute for Subatomic Physics
- Royal Netherlands Institute of Sea Research (NIOZ)
- Netherlands Institute for the Study of Crime and Law Enforcement (NSCR)
- SRON Netherlands Institute for Space Research

The institute Data Archiving and Networked Services (DANS, in cooperation with KNAW) and Netherlands eScience Center, in cooperation with SURF are also part of NWO.

=== Temporary Task Forces ===
The Temporary Task Forces have a semi-permanent status. They collaborate with industry experts in order to accelerate the development of promising technologies.

- National Initiative Brain & Cognition (NIHC)
- Netherlands Initiative for Education Research (NRO)
- Taskforce for Applied Research (NRPO-SIA)

== Stevin Prize ==
The Stevin Prize (Dutch: Stevinpremie) is one of the highest scientific awards in the Netherlands, established to recognize and reward outstanding researchers whose work has significant societal impact. It is administered and awarded by the NWO.

The Stevin Prize was established by the NWO in 2018. Named after Simon Stevin, a Flemish mathematician and engineer, the prize highlights contributions that bridge the gap between scientific research and practical applications that benefit society.

The prize was created to emphasize the importance of applied science in addressing real-world problems and contributing to societal progress. Since its inception, the Stevin Prize has been awarded annually to researchers across various disciplines, focusing on both scientific excellence and the potential for real-world application and societal benefit. It is awarded each year to two to three researchers.

Over the years, the prize has included a substantial monetary award, typically around 2.5 million euros, intended to support further research and dissemination activities. The Stevin Prize is one of the most prestigious scientific awards in the Netherlands, celebrating the achievements of researchers whose work exemplifies the practical application of scientific knowledge. The prize continues to promote research that addresses societal challenges and enhances community well-being both in the Netherlands and globally.

== See also ==
- Royal Netherlands Academy of Arts and Sciences (KNAW)
- Netherlands Organisation for Applied Scientific Research (TNO)
- Open access in the Netherlands
