= Cole Channel =

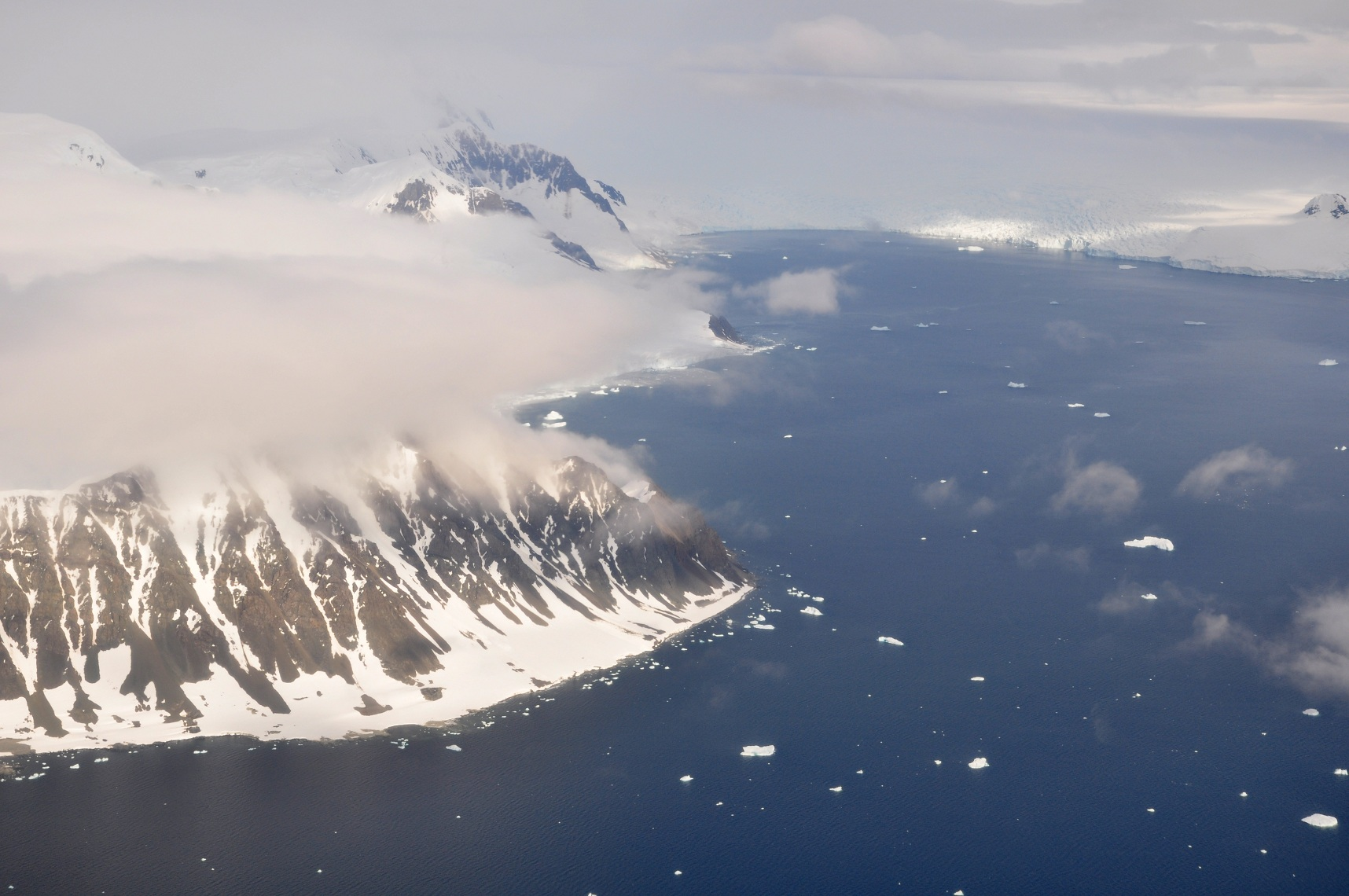
In this aerial picture of a part of Adelaide Island's east coast, Cole Channel is the body of water in the foreground, in front of the prominent Sighing Peak. Click on the picture for a detailed description of the other geographical features.

Cole Channel (67°22′S 67°50′W) is a marine channel running north–south between Wright Peninsula, Adelaide Island, and Wyatt Island, Laubeuf Fjord, off the Loubet Coast, Antarctica. It was named by the UK Antarctic Place-Names Committee in 1984 after Captain Maurice John Cole, Senior Master of the British Antarctic Survey ship Bransfield from 1975. Cole did previous Antarctic service as an officer on the John Biscoe and the Shackleton, for several seasons between 1960 and 1972.

Cole Channel could be considered a part of Laubeuf Fjord, as these water bodies are not clearly separated.
