= Wright Peninsula =

Peninsula in Antarctica

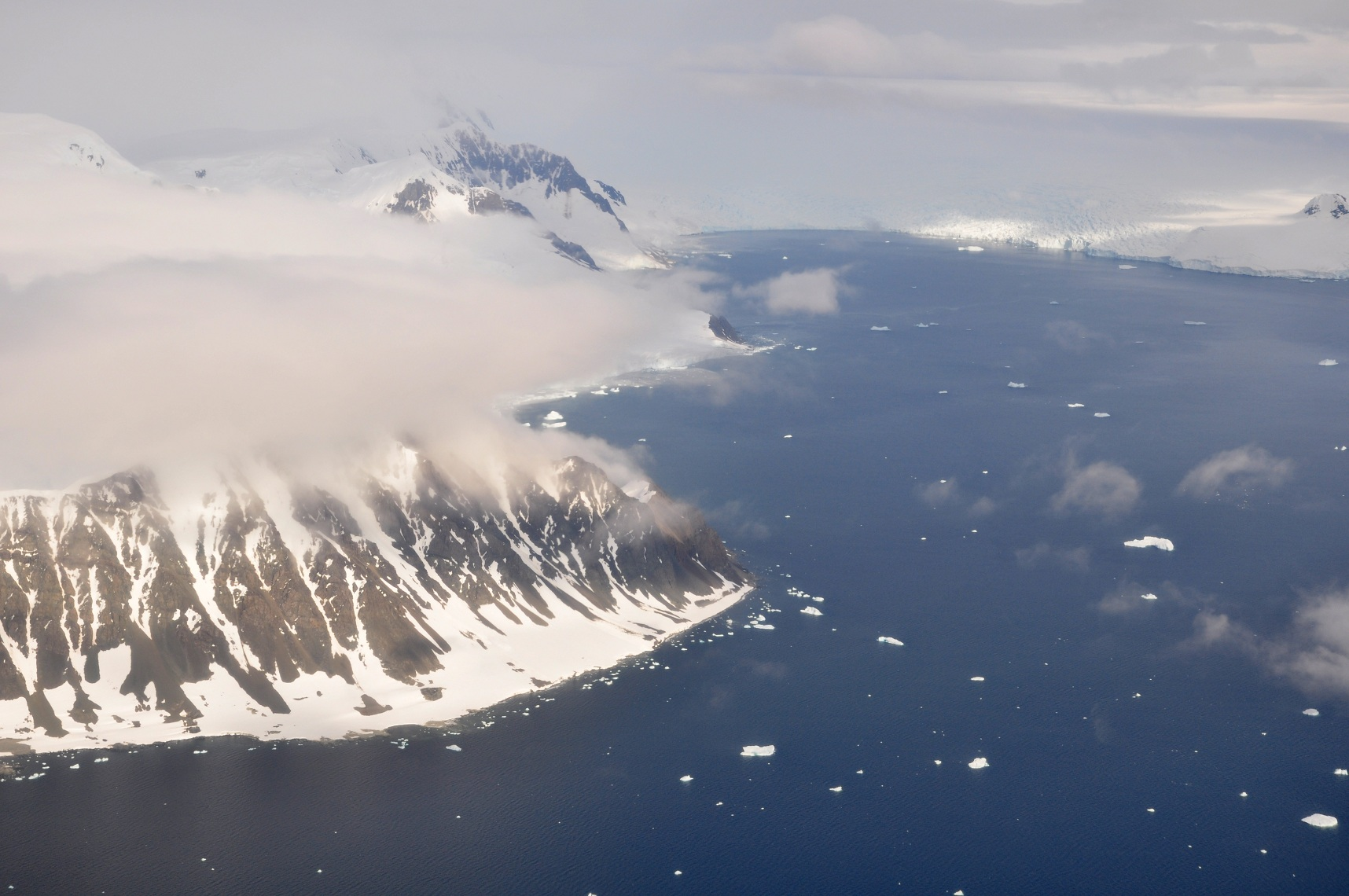
Sighing Peak (in front) and the Stokes Peaks behind it form the northern fringe of the Wright Peninsula. On the right is Stonehouse Bay. Click on the picture for a description of the other geographical features. Viewing direction is toward the west.

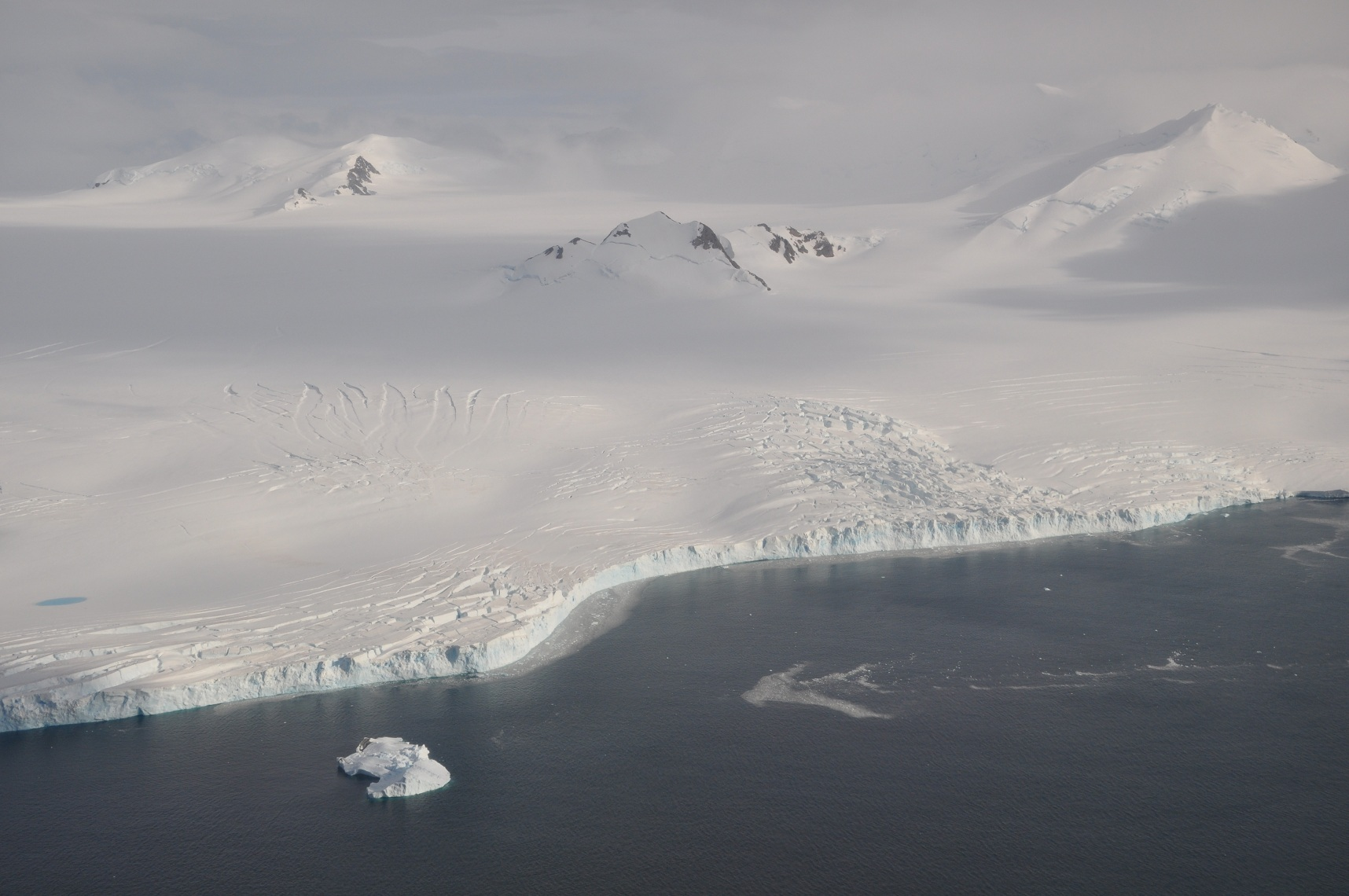
The Wormald Ice Piedmont covers large parts of the Wright Peninsula, and terminates in high ice cliffs on Laubeuf Fjord. The nunatak in the centre of the picture has a height of 398 m. The mountains on the right form part of the Stokes Peaks and mark the northern edge of the ice piedmont. On the far left a melting pond can be seen on the ice. Viewing direction is toward the north-northwest.

Wright Peninsula (67°28′S 68°10′W) is a peninsula on the east coast of Adelaide Island, Antarctica, lying between Stonehouse Bay to the north and Ryder Bay to the south. On its northern coastline the peninsula is fringed by the Stokes Peaks; on its southern side by the Reptile Ridge. The Princess Royal Range separates the peninsula from the rest of Adelaide Island; the only 'gap' is provided by McCallum Pass.

Its eastern coastline on Laubeuf Fjord is formed by the Wormald Ice Piedmont, whose vertical ice cliffs are broken in only two places to provide for ice-free landing sites. One of these is at Rothera Point at the southern tip of the peninsula, where the British Rothera Research Station is situated. The other is at tiny Mackay Point. Just off the piedmont is Webb Island.

Both the peninsula and the ice piedmont were surveyed by the Falkland Islands Dependencies Survey (FIDS) in 1961–62, and by the British Antarctic Survey (BAS) from 1976. Since 1985, there is a small specially protected area at Rothera Point of 0.1 km^{2}.

Prior to 1964, the peninsula was called "Square Peninsula" for its somewhat rectangular shape. It was re-named by the United Kingdom Antarctic Place-Names Committee (UK-APC) in 1964 for British Antarctic Survey surveyor Alan F. Wright. The piedmont was named by UK-APC in 1977 after Steven Wormald, a prominent former BAS staff member.
