= Sorge Island =

Island in Antarctica

Sorge Island (67°11′S 67°43′W) is an island lying just south of The Gullet in Barlas Channel, close east of Adelaide Island. Mapped by Falkland Islands Dependencies Survey (FIDS) from surveys and air photos, 1948–59. Named by United Kingdom Antarctic Place-Names Committee (UK-APC) for Ernst F.W. Sorge, German glaciologist who made the first seismic soundings of the Greenland ice sheet, 1929–31, and developed a theory of the densification of firn.

== See also ==
- List of Antarctic and sub-Antarctic islands
