= Anchorage Island (Antarctica) =

Island in Antarctica

- Location within Antarctica

Geography
- Location: Antarctica
- Coordinates: 67°36′14″S 68°12′33″W

Administration
- Administered under the Antarctic Treaty System

Demographics
- Population: Uninhabited

Anchorage Island is an island lying 1.3 kilometres (0.7 nmi) south-east of Lagoon Island in the Léonie Islands, off the southeast coast of Adelaide Island. Discovered by the French Antarctic Expedition (FrAE), 1908–10. Named by the British Graham Land Expedition (BGLE) under Rymill, who visited the island in February 1936.

== See also ==
- List of Antarctic and sub-Antarctic islands
