= Quest Channel =

Quest Channel (67°48′S 69°1′W) is a channel leading southwestward from Adelaide Anchorage between Hibbert Rock and Henkes Islands, off the south end of Adelaide Island. It was named by the United Kingdom Antarctic Place-Names Committee (UK-APC) after the survey motorboat which charted this area in 1963.

== See also ==
- Lord Bank
