= Nueva Rock =

Nueva Rock (67°44′S 69°10′W) is a submerged rock lying south of Cono Island and west of Cox Reef, off the south end of Adelaide Island. The name appears on an Argentine government chart of 1957 and suggests the recent discovery of the rock; nueva is a Spanish word meaning new.
