= Kirsty Island =

Island in Antarctica

- Location within Antarctica

Geography
- Location: Antarctica
- Coordinates: 67°36′S 68°16′W

Administration
- Administered under the Antarctic Treaty System

Demographics
- Population: Uninhabited

Kirsty Island is an island in Ryder Bay, west of Lagoon Island and East of Léonie Island. It has outcrops of reddish rocks and is used by scientists at Rothera Research Station as a site for marine research and recreation. It is named for Kirsty Brown, a marine biologist with the British Antarctic Survey (BAS) who was drowned to death by a leopard seal while snorkeling at Rothera Station in July 2003.
