= Jennings Reef =

Coordinates: 67°46′S 68°50′W

Jennings Reef is a reef, mostly submerged, extending between Avian Island and the Rocca Islands, off the south end of Adelaide Island, Antarctica. It was named by the UK Antarctic Place-Names Committee for Leading Seaman Ronald A.J. Jennings, the coxswain of the survey motorboat Quest, used by the Royal Navy Hydrographic Survey Unit which charted the feature in 1963.
