= Barlas Channel =

Barlas Channel (67°13′S 67°45′W) is a channel, 8 nautical miles (15 km) long and 2 nautical miles (4 km) wide, in the northern part of Laubeuf Fjord, extending southwest from The Gullet and separating Day Island from Adelaide Island. It was first roughly surveyed in 1936 by the British Graham Land Expedition under John Rymill, and resurveyed in 1948 by the Falkland Islands Dependencies Survey, who named it for William Barlas.
