= Buchanan Passage =

Buchanan Passage (66°48′S 67°42′W) is a marine channel separating Liard Island from Adelaide Island at the north end of Hanusse Bay. It was discovered and first charted by the French Antarctic Expedition, 1908–10, under Jean-Baptiste Charcot, and named by the UK Antarctic Place-Names Committee for Captain Peter Buchanan, Royal Navy, commanding officer of HMS Endurance in the Antarctic Peninsula area, 1968–70, who proved that the passage can be used to approach Marguerite Bay from the North, through The Gullet.
