= Crosse Passage =

Crosse Passage (67°47′S 68°55′W) is a small passage leading southeast from Adelaide Anchorage between the Henkes Islands and the Skeen Rocks, off the south end of Adelaide Island. It was named by the UK Antarctic Place-Names Committee in 1963 for Lieutenant Commander Anthony G. Crosse, Royal Navy, First Lieutenant of HMS Protector which was used by the Hydrographic Survey Unit in charting this area in 1961–63.
