= Tickle Channel =

Strait in Antarctica

Tickle Channel (67°6′S 67°43′W) is a narrow channel in the south part of Hanusse Bay, from 1 to 3 nautical miles (6 km) wide and 5 nautical miles (9 km) long, extending northward from The Gullet and separating Hansen Island from the east extremity of Adelaide Island. First seen from the air by the British Graham Land Expedition (BGLE) on a flight in February 1936. Surveyed from the ground in 1948 by the Falkland Islands Dependencies Survey (FIDS), who applied this descriptive name. In Newfoundland and Labrador a tickle is a narrow water passage as between two islands.
