= Hibbert Rock =

Hibbert Rock (67°46′S 69°02′W) is a drying rock that lies southeast of League Rock, located in the Quest Channel off the Southern tip of Adelaide Island. It was named by the UK Antarctic Place-Names Committee for William Hibbert, who worked as the ship engineer of the RRS John Biscoe (1956) from the late 1950s to 1960s. That ship assisted the Royal Navy Hydrographic Survey Unit in surveying the area between 1962 and 1963.

== Sources ==
- Antarctic Place-names Committee
