= Shambles Glacier =

Glacier in Antarctica

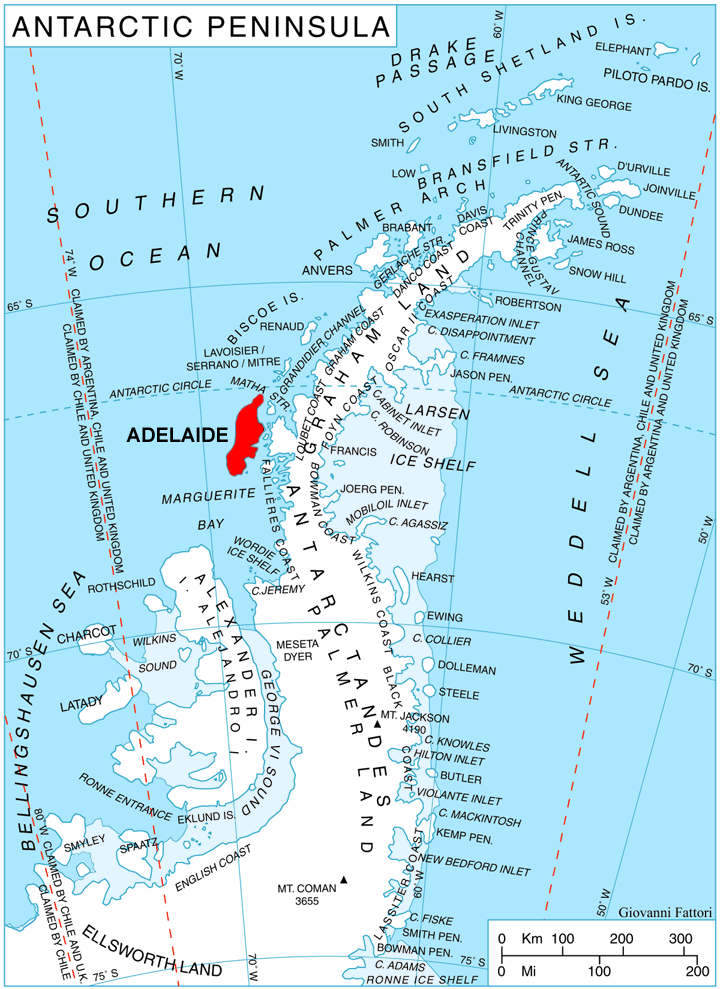
- Location of Adelaide Island in the Antarctic Peninsula

- Location within Antarctica
- Location: Adelaide Island
- Coordinates: 67°37′S 68°29′W
- Length: 4 nmi (7 km; 5 mi)
- Thickness: unknown
- Terminus: Stonehouse Bay
- Status: unknown

Shambles Glacier (67°20′S 68°13′W) is a steep glacier 4 miles (6 km) long and 6 miles (10 km) wide, with very prominent hummocks and crevasses, flowing east between Mount Bouvier and Mount Mangin into Stonehouse Bay on the east side of Adelaide Island. It is the island's largest glacier, and provides an eastern outlet from the giant Fuchs Ice Piedmont which covers the entire western two-thirds of the island. In doing so, Shambles Glacier provides the largest 'gap' in Adelaide Island's north–south running mountain chain.

== History ==
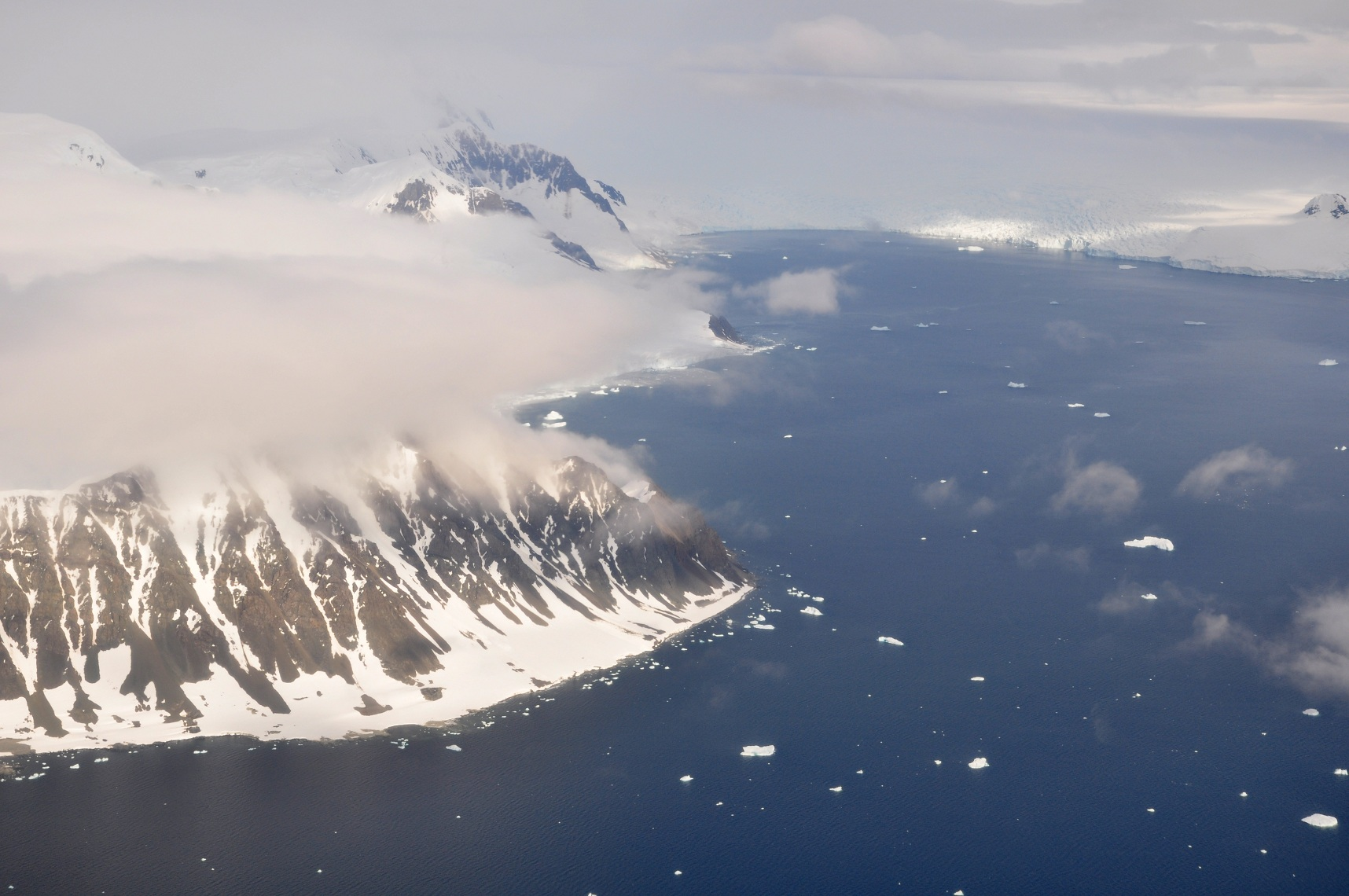
In this aerial picture of a part of Adelaide Island's east coast, the Shambles Glacier can be seen in the upper right hand corner

The lower reaches of the glacier were first sighted and surveyed in 1909 by the French Antarctic Expedition under Jean-Baptiste Charcot, and resurveyed in 1948 by the Falkland Islands Dependencies Survey (FIDS). The upper reaches were mapped from air photos taken by the Ronne Antarctic Research Expedition (RARE), in 1947–48, and by the Falkland Islands and Dependencies Aerial Survey Expedition (FIDASE), 1956–57. So named by the FIDS because of the very broken nature of the glacier's surface.

== See also ==
- List of glaciers in the Antarctic
