= Webb Island =

Island in Antarctica

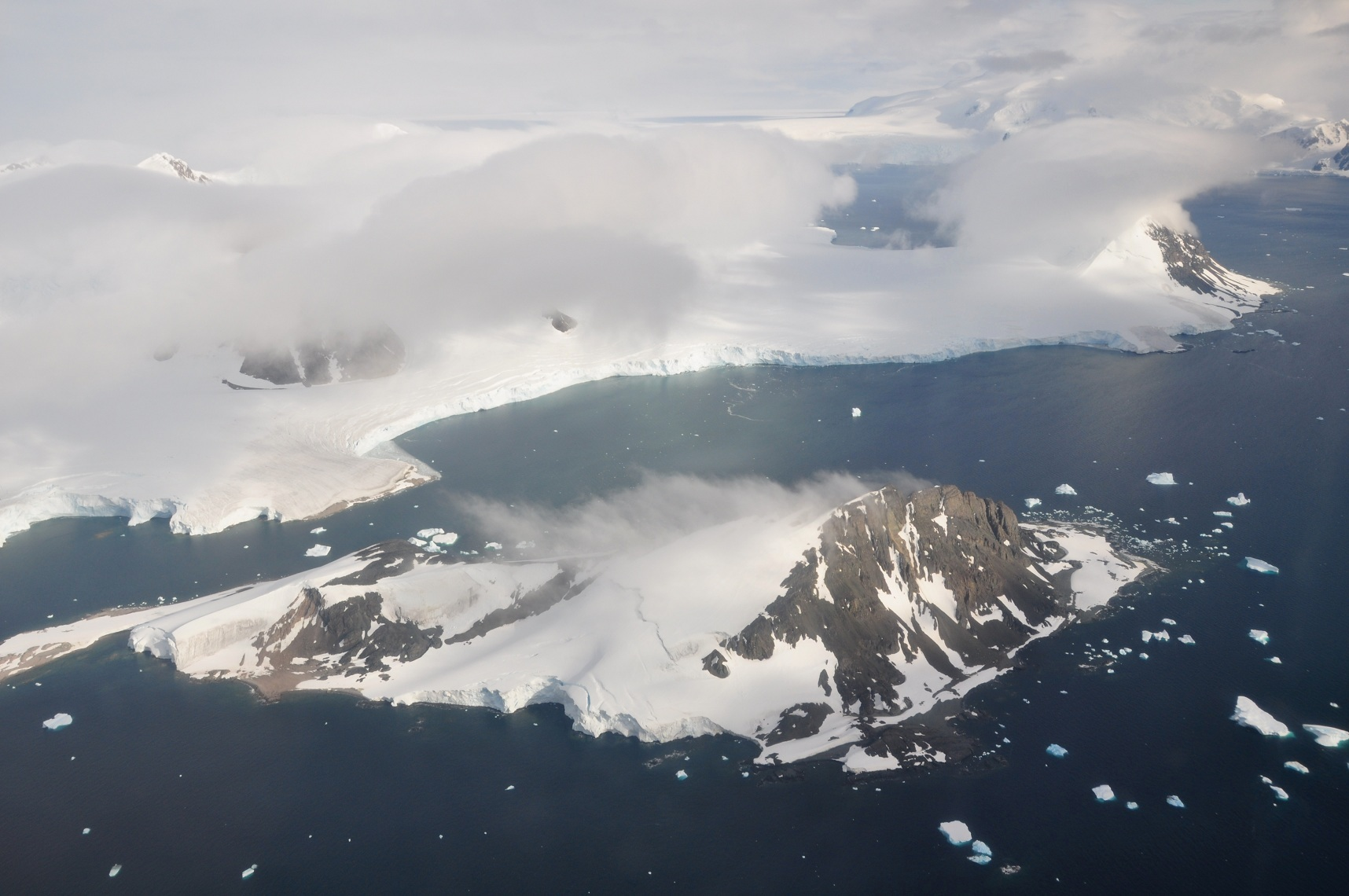
Webb island, in front of Adelaide Island's east coast. Click on the picture for a description of the other geographical features in this image.

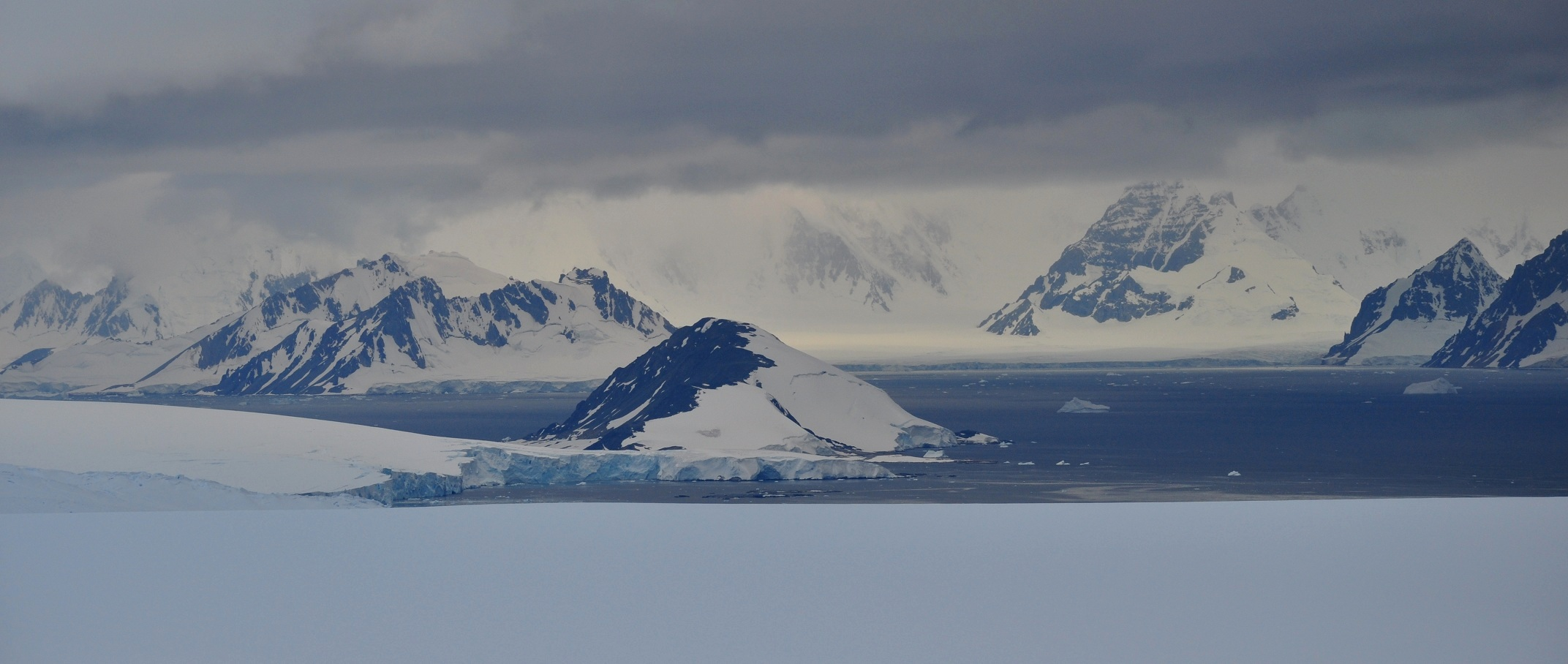
Webb Island is at the centre of this picture, taken from the Wormald Ice Piedmont on Adelaide Island. Further away and to the left is Wyatt Island. The mountains in the distance are all on the Arrowsmith Peninsula of the Antarctic mainland.

Webb Island (67°27′S 67°56′W) is a rocky island in Antarctica, 1.5 nautical miles (2.8 km) long, lying in Laubeuf Fjord about 3 nautical miles (6 km) south of the entrance to Stonehouse Bay, close to Adelaide Island. It was discovered by the French Antarctic Expedition under Jean Baptiste Charcot, 1908–10, and named by him for Captain (later Admiral Sir) Richard C. Webb of the Royal Navy, commanding officer of an English cruiser in Argentine waters at that time.

== See also ==
- List of Antarctic and sub-Antarctic islands
