= Woodfield Channel =

Geographical feature

Woodfield Channel (67°49′S 68°44′W) is a deep water channel between the Dion Islands and Henkes and Rocca Islands, off the south end of Adelaide Island. Named by the United Kingdom Antarctic Place-Names Committee (UK-APC) in 1963 for Thomas Woodfield, First Officer of RRS Hydrographic Survey Unit in the survey of this area in 1963.
