= Ives Bank =

- Submerged bank Ives Bank (Antarctica)
- Interactive map of Ives Bank
- Ocean: Southern Ocean

Ives Bank (67°40′S 68°12′W) is a submarine bank with a least depth of 11 metres (6 fathoms) in the Bellingshausen Sea. It is located in the southern approaches to Ryder Bay, Adelaide Island, Antarctica, 1 mile (1.6 km) south of the Mikkelsen Islands. It was named by the UK Antarctic Place-Names Committee after Lieutenant Commander David M. Ives, Royal Navy, who surveyed this bank from HMS Endurance in March 1981.
