= Stokes Peaks =

Group of peaks on the north side of Wright Peninsula, Adelaide Island, Antarctica

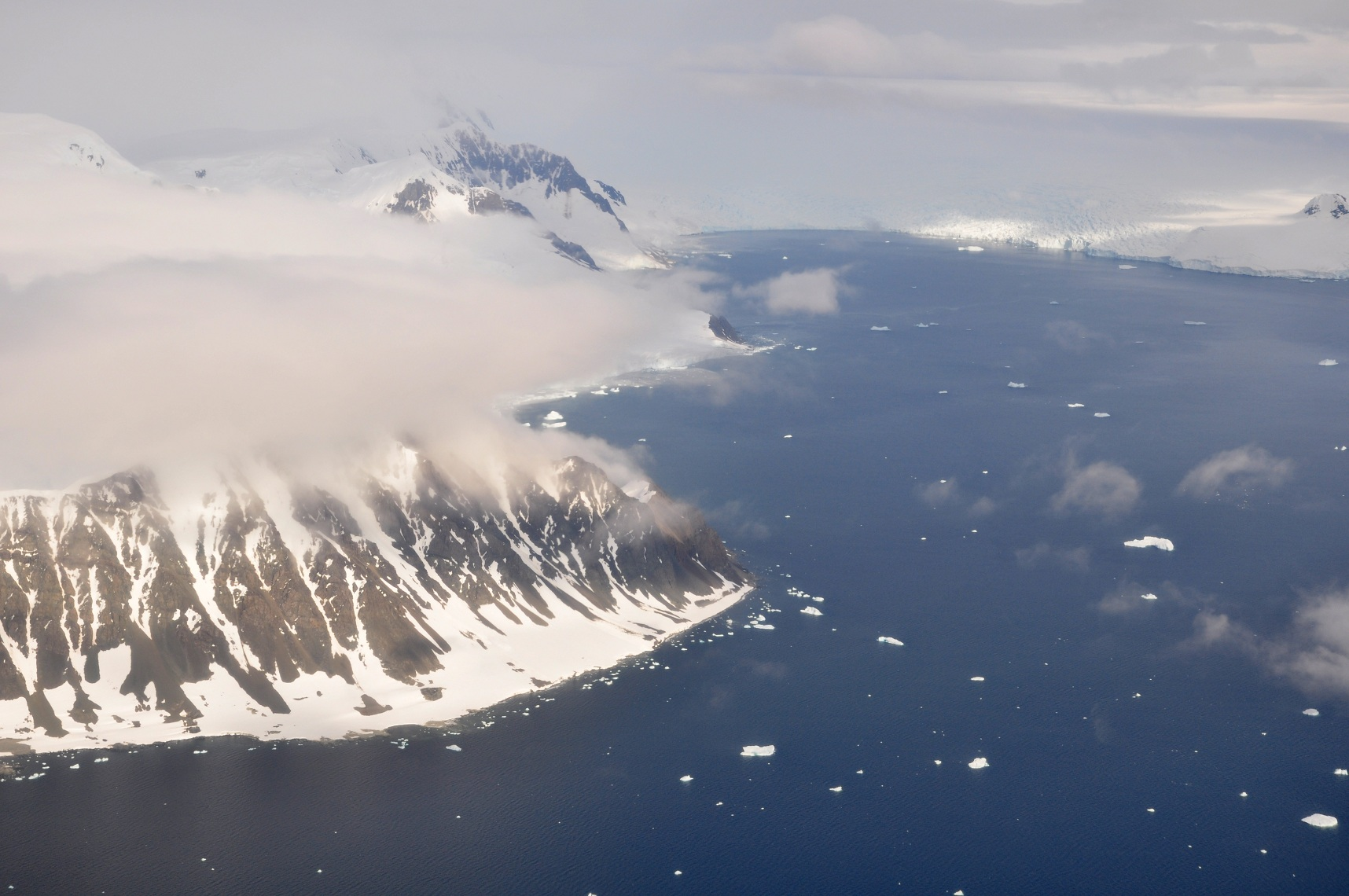
In this aerial picture of a part of Adelaide Island's east coast, the Stokes Peaks are visible left of center, in the background, behind the prominent Sighing Peak. Click on the picture for a detailed description of the other geographical features.

The Stokes Peaks (67°24′S 68°9′W) is a group of peaks rising to about 800 m between McCallum Pass and Sighing Peak on the north side of Wright Peninsula, Adelaide Island, Antarctica. They were photographed from the air by the Falkland Islands and Dependencies Aerial Survey Expedition (FIDASE), 1956–57, and surveyed by the British Antarctic Survey (BAS), in 1961–62. They were named by the United Kingdom Antarctic Place-Names Committee (UK-APC) in 1977 for Jeffrey C.A. Stokes, Falkland Islands Dependencies Survey (FIDS) assistant surveyor, Admiralty Bay, 1959–60, and Adelaide Island, 1960–61.
