= Turner Glacier =

Glacier in Antarctica

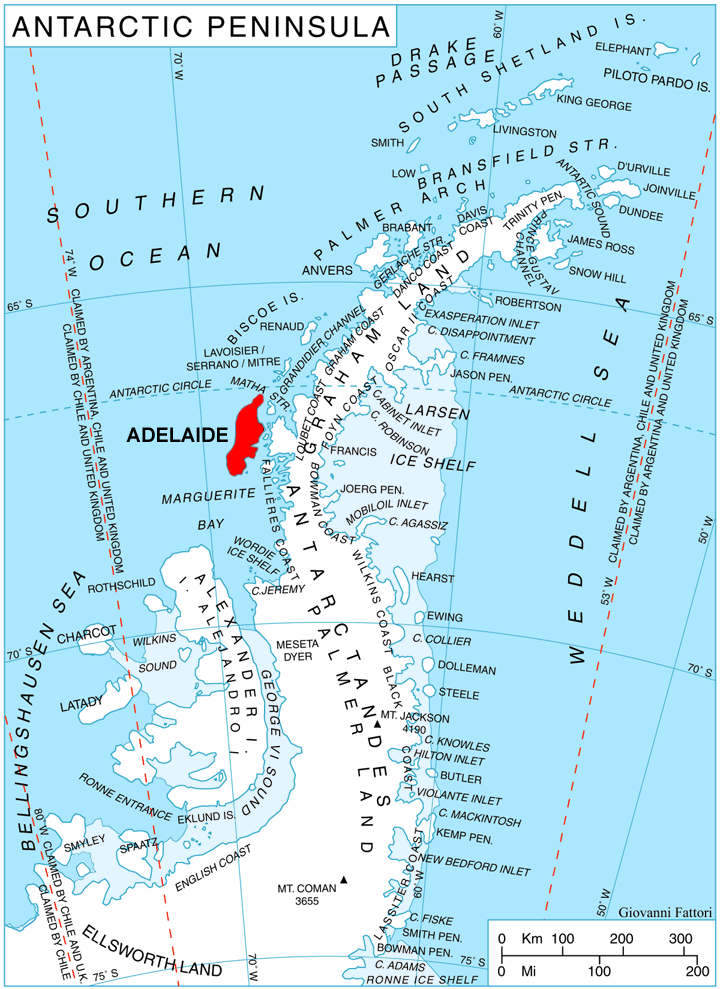
- Location of Adelaide Island in the Antarctic Peninsula

- Location within Antarctica
- Location: Adelaide Island
- Coordinates: 67°37′S 68°29′W
- Thickness: unknown
- Terminus: Ryder Bay
- Status: unknown

Turner Glacier (67°37′S 68°29′W) is a glacier on the east side of Mount Liotard flowing northeast into Ryder Bay, Adelaide Island. The glacier was surveyed by Falkland Islands Dependencies Survey (FIDS), 1948, and photographed from the air by Falkland Islands and Dependencies Aerial Survey Expedition (FIDASE), 1956–57. Named by the United Kingdom Antarctic Place-Names Committee (UK-APC) in 1977 after Andrew John Turner, British Antarctic Survey (BAS) builder, Halley Station, 1973–74; Signy Island, 1974–75; Rothera Station, 1976–77, 1978–80; and Faraday Station, 1982–83.

It should not be confused with the Turner Glacier on Baffin Island in Nunavut, Canada, adjoining Mount Asgard.

== See also ==
- List of glaciers in the Antarctic
- Glaciology
