= Fletcher Bluff =

Fletcher Bluff (67°36′S 68°42′W) is a rock-faced, snow-backed bluff, about 800 metres (2,600 ft) high, located 3 nautical miles (6 km) west-northwest of the summit of Mount Liotard on the eastern margin of Fuchs Ice Piedmont, Adelaide Island. It was named in 1983 by the UK Antarctic Place-Names Committee after David D.W. Fletcher, a British Antarctic Survey general assistant at Halley Station, 1972–73, and Station Commander at Signy Station, 1973–76, and Rothera Station, 1976–81.
