= Patience Rocks =

Patience Rocks (67°45′S 68°56′W) is a group of rocks lying 1.5 nautical miles (2.8 km) northwest of Avian Island, close off the south end of Adelaide Island. Named by the United Kingdom Antarctic Place-Names Committee (UK-APC) for Leading Engineer Mechanic Donald Patience, a member of the Royal Navy Hydrographic Survey Unit which charted this area in 1963.
