= Brockhamp Islands =

Islands near Adelaide Island, Antarctica

Brockhamp Island
- Location within Antarctica Location within Antarctic Peninsula

Geography
- Location: Antarctica
- Coordinates: 67°17′S 67°56′W

Administration
- Administered under the Antarctic Treaty System

Demographics
- Population: Uninhabited

The Brockhamp Islands are two small islands in Laubeuf Fjord, lying 6 kilometres (3 nmi) southwest of Mothes Point, Adelaide Island. They were mapped by the Falkland Islands Dependencies Survey (FIDS) from Ronne Antarctic Research Expedition air photos, 1947–48, and FIDS surveys, 1948–50. They were named by the UK Antarctic Place-Names Committee for Bernhard Brockhamp, a German glaciologist who, with H. Mothes, made the first seismic soundings of a glacier, in Austria in 1926.

== See also ==
- List of Antarctic and sub-Antarctic islands
