= Hunt Peak =

Mountain in Antarctica

Hunt Peak (67°18′S 68°2′W) is a triangular rock peak, 610 metres (2,000 ft) high, marking the north side of the entrance to Stonehouse Bay on the east coast of Adelaide Island, Antarctica. It was discovered and first roughly surveyed in 1909 by the French Antarctic Expedition under Jean-Baptiste Charcot. It was resurveyed in 1948 by the Falkland Islands Dependencies Survey (FIDS), who named the point marked by this peak for Sergeant Kenneth D. Hunt, a mechanic for the expedition's Noorduyn Norseman airplane in 1950. Further survey in 1957–58 by the FIDS showed no definable point in the vicinity and the name was transferred to the peak.
