= Mount Bouvier =

Mountain in Graham Land, Antarctica

Highest point
- Elevation: 2,250 m (7,380 ft)
- Prominence: 1,551 m (5,089 ft)
- Listing: Ultra, Ribu

Mount Bouvier (67°14′S 68°9′W) is a massive, mainly ice-covered mountain, 2,250 metres (7,380 ft) high, immediately north of the head of Stonehouse Bay in the east part of Adelaide Island. It was discovered and roughly positioned by the French Antarctic Expedition, 1903–05, and named by Jean-Baptiste Charcot for Louis Bouvier, a prominent French naturalist. It was re-surveyed by the French Antarctic Expedition, 1908–10, and by the Falkland Islands Dependencies Survey in 1948–50.
