= Covey Rocks =

- Location within Antarctica

Geography
- Location: Antarctica
- Coordinates: 67°33′S 67°43′W

Administration
- Administered under the Antarctic Treaty System

Demographics
- Population: Uninhabited

Covey Rocks are a small group of rocks in Laubeuf Fjord, lying midway between Pinero Island and Cape Saenz, off the west coast of Graham Land. They were first roughly surveyed in 1936 by the British Graham Land Expedition under John Rymill. They were resurveyed in 1948 by the Falkland Islands Dependencies Survey, who gave the name because of the resemblance of these rocks to a covey of partridges sitting in a field.
