= Box Reef =

Box Reef (67°45′S 69°3′W) is a line of drying rocks lying between Esplin Islands and League Rock, off the south end of Adelaide Island. The name, given by the UK Antarctic Place-Names Committee in 1963 in association with nearby Cox Reef, derives from Box and Cox, the well-known English literary allusion to two individuals who occupied the same lodgings alternately day and night without knowledge of each other.
