= Piñero Peak =

Mountain in Antarctica

Piñero Peak (67°34′S 67°49′W) is the highest point (380 metres (1,250 ft)) of Piñero Island in Laubeuf Fjord, west Graham Land. Named after the island by the United Kingdom Antarctic Place-Names Committee in 1980.
