= Lagoon Island =

Island in Antarctica

- Location within Antarctica

Geography
- Location: Antarctica
- Coordinates: 67°35′34″S 68°14′06″W

Administration
- Administered under the Antarctic Treaty System

Demographics
- Population: Uninhabited

Lagoon Island is the northernmost of the Léonie Islands, lying in the entrance to Ryder Bay on the southeast side of Adelaide Island, Antarctica. It was discovered by the French Antarctic Expedition, 1908–10, under Jean-Baptiste Charcot. The island was charted by the British Graham Land Expedition under John Rymill in February 1936 and was so named because with the island on its west side it forms a lagoon.

== See also ==
- List of Antarctic and sub-Antarctic islands
