= Lord Bank =

- Submerged bank Lord Bank (Antarctica)
- Interactive map of Lord Bank
- Ocean: Southern Ocean

Lord Bank (67°50′S 69°15′W) is a submarine bank in the Bellingshausen Sea with a least depth of 18 metres (60 ft) lying west-southwest of the entrance to Quest Channel, Adelaide Island, Antarctica. The bank was surveyed from HMS Endurance in January 1980 and was named by the UK Antarctic Place-Names Committee after Captain James Trevor Lord, Royal Navy, the commanding officer of HMS Endurance, 1978–80.
