= Henkes Islands =

Group of islands in Antarctica

- Location within Antarctica Location within Antarctic Peninsula

Geography
- Location: Antarctica
- Coordinates: 67°48′S 68°56′W

Administration
- Administered under the Antarctic Treaty System

Demographics
- Population: Uninhabited

The Henkes Islands are a group of small islands and rocks 4 kilometres (2 nmi) in extent, lying 2 kilometres (1 nmi) southwest of Avian Island, close off the southern extremity of Adelaide Island, Antarctica. The islands were discovered by the French Antarctic Expedition, 1908–10, under Jean-Baptiste Charcot, and named by him for one of the Dutch directors of the Magellan Whaling Company at Punta Arenas. Charcot applied the name to the scattered rocks and islands between Cape Adriasola and Cape Alexandra, and the name was restricted to the group described by the UK Antarctic Place-Names Committee (UKAPC) following definitive mapping by the British Antarctic Survey (BAS) in 1961 and the British Royal Navy Hydrographic Survey (BRNHS) in 1963. All of the islands in the group were named by UKAPC.

Worth Reef is an arc of rocks forming the northernmost part of the Henkes Islands. They were named for Acting Corporal David A. Worth of the BRNHS. The easternmost of the Henkes Islands is Biggs Island, actually a small island. It was named for Thomas Biggs, a Falkland Islander, coxswain of the launch of RRS John Biscoe, which was used by the BRNHS to chart this island in 1963. Between Biggs and Preston islands are four rocks collectively known as the Dean Rocks, named for Engineer Mechanic Thomas Dean of the BRNHS.

The largest of the Henkes Islands is Preston Island, which was named for Frank Preston, BAS officer in charge at Adelaide station. The second largest island in the group is Crouch Island, surveyed by BRNHS in 1963, and named for Alan Crouch, BAS general assistant at Adelaide station. Both were members of the first party to winter at Adelaide station, 1961–62.

== See also ==
- Crosse Passage
- List of Antarctic and sub-Antarctic islands
