= Milestone Bluff =

Milestone Bluff (67°38′S 68°45′W) is a rock-faced, snow-backed bluff rising to about 830 metres (2,720 ft) just west-southwest of Mount Liotard, in the south part of Adelaide Island, Antarctica. it was so named by the UK Antarctic Place-Names Committee in 1964 because the bluff is an important landmark on the inland route north of Adelaide station.
