= Mount Bridgman =

Mountain in Graham Land, Antarctica

Highest point
- Elevation: 1,415 m (4,642 ft)
- Prominence: 1,415 m (4,642 ft)
- Listing: Ribu

Mount Bridgman (66°50′S 67°23′W) is a prominent mountain which surmounts the central part of Liard Island in Hanusse Bay, which is a broad V-Shaped bay off the west coast of Graham Land, Antarctica. It was mapped from photos obtained by the Ronne Antarctic Research Expedition (1947–48) and the Falkland Islands and Dependencies Aerial Survey Expedition (1956–57). It was named by the UK Antarctic Place-Names Committee for Percy W. Bridgman, an American physicist who discovered the high-pressure forms of ice.
