= Esplin Islands =

Pair of islands in Antarctica

- Location within Antarctica

Geography
- Location: Antarctica
- Coordinates: 67°45′S 69°0′W

Administration
- Administered under the Antarctic Treaty System

Demographics
- Population: Uninhabited

The Esplin Islands are a group of two small islands and off-lying rocks lying northeast of Box Reef, off the south end of Adelaide Island. They were named by the UK Antarctic Place-Names Committee for Sub. Lieutenant Christopher J. Esplin Jones, Royal Navy, a member of the Royal Navy Hydrographic Survey Unit which charted this group in 1962–63.

== See also ==
- List of Antarctic and sub-Antarctic islands
