= Neumann Peak =

Mountain in Antarctica

Neumann Peak (67°4′S 67°34′W) is a peak on the north end of Hansen Island, in Hanusse Bay in Graham Land. Mapped from air photos taken by Ronne Antarctic Research Expedition (RARE), 1947–48, and Falkland Islands and Dependencies Aerial Survey Expedition (FIDASE), 1956–57. Named by United Kingdom Antarctic Place-Names Committee (UK-APC) for Franz Ernst Neumann (1798–1895), German physicist who made an important contribution to understanding of the thermal conductivity of ice.
