= Mikkelsen Islands =

Group of islands in Antarctica

- Location within Antarctica Location within Antarctic Peninsula

Geography
- Location: Antarctica
- Coordinates: 67°38′S 68°11′W

Administration
- Administered under the Antarctic Treaty System

Demographics
- Population: Uninhabited

The Mikkelsen Islands are a small group of islands and rocks lying off the southeast coast of Adelaide Island, 4 kilometres (2 nmi) southeast of the Léonie Islands. They were discovered by the French Antarctic Expedition under Jean-Baptiste Charcot in 1908–10 and named by him for Otto Mikkelsen, the Norwegian diver who inspected the damaged hull of the Pourquoi-Pas at Deception Island.

== See also ==
- List of Antarctic and subantarctic islands
