= Killingbeck (disambiguation) =

Killingbeck is a district of Leeds, West Yorkshire, England.

Killingbeck may also refer to:

- Killingbeck Island, an island of Adelaide Island, Antarctica

== People with the surname ==
- Molly Killingbeck (born 1959), Jamaican-born Canadian sprinter
