= Glen Peak =

Peak in Antarctica

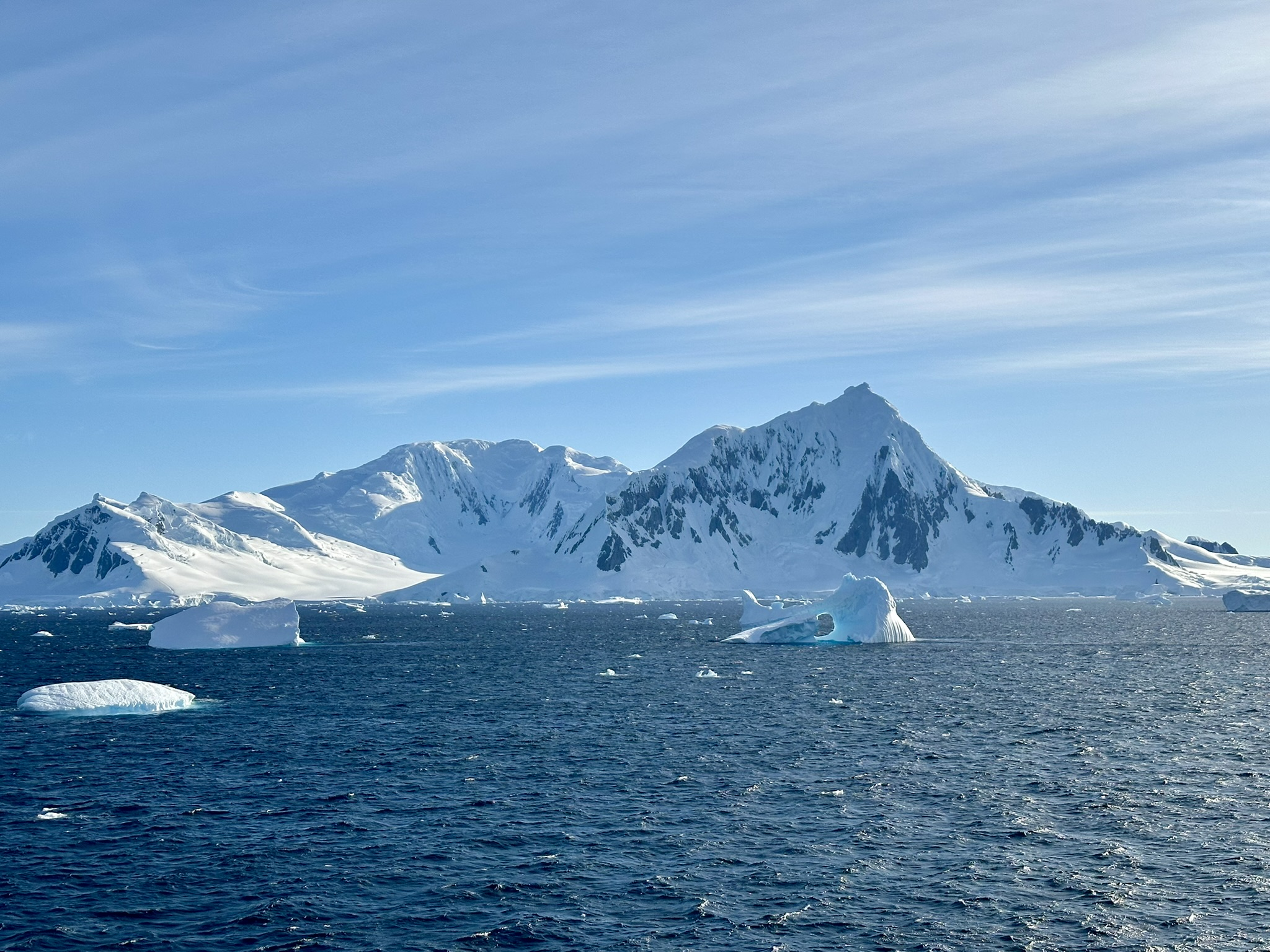
Glen Peak (on the right)

Glen Peak (66°46′S 67°24′W) is a peak on the north end of Liard Island in Hanusse Bay, Antarctica. It was mapped from air photos obtained by the Ronne Antarctic Research Expedition (1947–48) and the Falkland Islands and Dependencies Aerial Survey Expedition (1956–57). It was named by the UK Antarctic Place-Names Committee for John W. Glen, a British physicist who has made laboratory investigations on the flow of single and polycrystalline ice.
