= Mount Barre =

Mountain in Graham Land, Antarctica

Mount Barre (67°30′S 68°33′W) is a mountain with an ice-covered, pyramidal peak, 2,195 m, standing 2 nautical miles (3.7 km) northeast of Mount Gaudry in the south part of Adelaide Island. Discovered and surveyed in 1909 by the French Antarctic Expedition under Charcot. Resurveyed in 1948 by the Falkland Islands Dependencies Survey (FIDS) and named by the United Kingdom Antarctic Place-Names Committee (UK-APC) for Michel Barre, leader of the French Antarctic Expedition to the Adelie Coast, 1951–52.
