= Cenobite Rocks =

Coordinates: 67°35′S 69°18′W

The Cenobite Rocks are a small isolated group of rocks lying 5 nautical miles (9 km) northwest of Cape Adriasola, off the southwest coast of Adelaide Island. The group was so named by the UK Antarctic Place-Names Committee in 1963 because of its isolated position.
