= Ice piedmont =

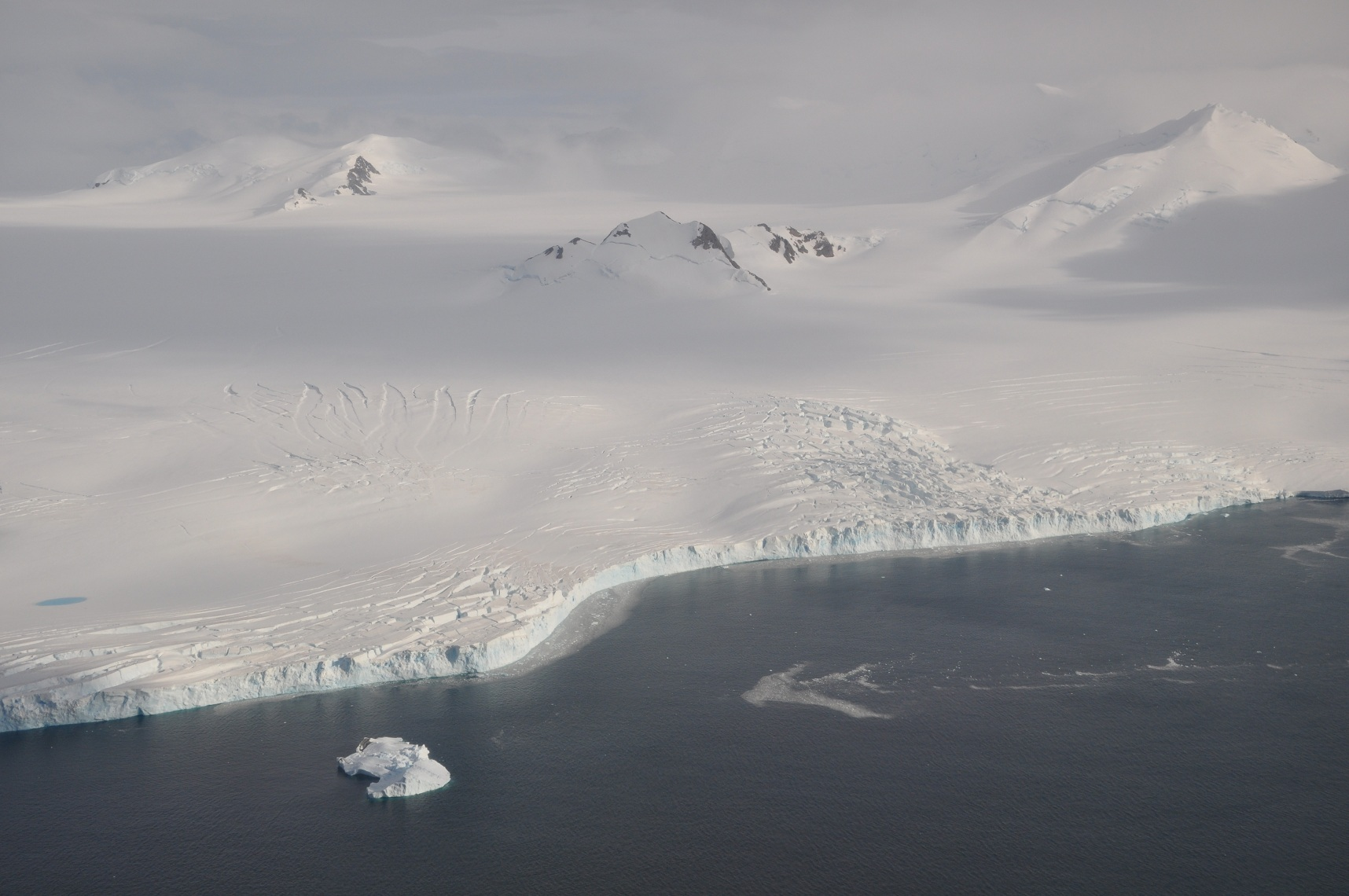
The Wormald Ice Piedmont covers large parts of the Wright Peninsula on eastern Adelaide Island, Antarctica, and terminates in high ice cliffs on Laubeuf Fjord. The nunatak in the centre of the picture has a height of 398 m (1,306 ft). The mountains on the right form part of the Stokes Peaks and mark the northern edge of the ice piedmont. On the far left a melting pond can be seen on the ice. Viewing direction is toward the NNW.

An ice piedmont consists of "Ice covering a coastal strip of low-lying land backed by mountains."
