= Cox Reef =

Cox Reef (67°45′S 69°5′W) is a group of drying rocks lying northwest of Box Reef off the south end of Adelaide Island. It was named by the UK Antarctic Place-Names Committee in 1963 for Able Seaman Edward F. Cox, a member of the Royal Navy Hydrographic Survey Unit which first charted this feature in 1963.
