= Hinks Channel =

Hinks Channel (67°16′S 67°37′W) is an arc-shaped channel in the northern part of Laubeuf Fjord, 2 nautical miles (4 km) wide and 11 nautical miles (20 km) long, which extends from The Gullet and separates Day Island on the west from Arrowsmith Peninsula and Wyatt Island on the east, off the west coast of Graham Land, Antarctica. It was first roughly surveyed in 1936 by the British Graham Land Expedition under Rymill, and was resurveyed in 1948 by the Falkland Islands Dependencies Survey who named it for Arthur R. Hinks.
