= McCallum Pass =

McCallum Pass (67°23′S 68°18′W) is a pass between the northeast ridge of Mount Mangin and the ridge on the south side of Stonehouse Bay, in the southern part of Adelaide Island, Antarctica. It was named by the UK Antarctic Place-Names Committee in 1963 for Hugh C.G. McCallum (b.1937) of the British Antarctic Survey, who with A. Crouch first traversed the pass in 1961.
