= Mount Bodys =

Mountain in Graham Land, Antarctica

Mount Bodys (67°9′S 67°48′W) is the easternmost mountain on Adelaide Island. It rises over 1,220 m and is ice-covered except for small rock exposures on the south side. First roughly surveyed in 1909 by the French Antarctic Expedition under Charcot. Resurveyed in 1948 by the Falkland Islands Dependencies Survey (FIDS), and named by them for Sgt. William S. Bodys, mechanic for the expedition's Norseman airplane in 1950.
