= Quilp Rock =

Coordinates: 67°37′S 67°47′W

Quilp Rock is a small, isolated rock in Laubeuf Fjord, lying 6.5 kilometres (3.5 nmi) south-southeast of the south tip of Pinero Island and 2.4 kilometres (1.3 nmi) off the northwest side of Pourquoi Pas Island, off the west coast of Graham Land. First surveyed in 1948 by the Falkland Islands Dependencies Survey (FIDS), it was named by them after the dwarf, Daniel Quilp, a vicious, ill-tempered character in The Old Curiosity Shop, by Charles Dickens. It is one of many named rock formations of Graham Land.

== See also ==
- List of Antarctic and subantarctic islands
