= Léonie Island =

Island in Antarctica

- Location within Antarctica

Geography
- Location: Antarctica
- Coordinates: 67°36′S 68°21′W
- Highest elevation: 455 m (1493 ft)

Administration
- Administered under the Antarctic Treaty System

Demographics
- Population: Uninhabited

Léonie Island is the largest and westernmost of the Léonie Islands, 2 kilometres (1 nmi) in diameter and 455 metres (1,500 ft) high, lying in the entrance to Ryder Bay along the southeast side of Adelaide Island, Antarctica. It was discovered and named by the French Antarctic Expedition, 1908–10, under Jean-Baptiste Charcot.

== See also ==
- List of Antarctic and sub-Antarctic islands
