= Ginger Islands =

Islands of Antarctica

- Location within Antarctica

Geography
- Location: Antarctica
- Coordinates: 67°45′S 68°42′W

Administration
- Administered under the Antarctic Treaty System

Demographics
- Population: Uninhabited

The Ginger Islands are a group of islands lying west of Cape Alexandra, off the southern end of Adelaide Island, Antarctica. The largest of the islands appears reddish when free of snow. They were surveyed by the Royal Navy's hydrographic survey unit in 1962-63 and named by the United Kingdom Antarctic Place-Names Committee (UK-APC) for Kenneth Ginger, Civil Hydrographic Officer responsible for British Admiralty charts of the Antarctic for several years beginning in 1958.

== Important Bird Area ==
The island group, with the intervening marine area, has been identified as an Important Bird Area (IBA) by BirdLife International because it supports a breeding colony of about 275 pairs of imperial shags, as well as over 3000 pairs of Adélie penguins.

== See also ==
- List of Antarctic and subantarctic islands
