= Adelaide Anchorage =

Location of Adelaide Anchorage
Antarctica

Adelaide Anchorage (67°47′S 68°57′W) is an area of safe anchorage lying west of Avian Island, off the south end of Adelaide Island. It is the anchorage normally used by ships visiting Adelaide research station. Charted by members of the RRS John Biscoe and the Royal Navy Hydrographic Survey Unit in January–March 1962.
