= Rocca Islands =

Group of islands in Antarctica

Rocca Islands (67°47′S 68°46′W) is a group of small islands and rocks 3 nautical miles (6 km) east of Avian Island, off the south end of Adelaide Island. Discovered in 1909 by the French Antarctic Expedition and named by Charcot for Monsieur Rocca, an acquaintance in Punta Arenas. Remapped by the British Royal Navy Hydrographic Survey Unit in 1963.

== See also ==
- List of Antarctic and sub-Antarctic islands
