= Fuchs Ice Piedmont =

Fuchs Ice Piedmont (67°10′S 68°40′W) is an ice piedmont 70 nautical miles (130 km) long, extending in a northeast–southwest direction along the entire west coast of Adelaide Island. It was first mapped in 1909 by the French Antarctic Expedition under Jean-Baptiste Charcot. It was named by the Falkland Islands Dependencies Survey (FIDS) for Sir Vivian E. Fuchs, FIDS base leader and geologist at Stonington Island in 1948–49.

Near the southeast end of the piedmont, 3 nmi (5.6 km) west-northwest of the summit of Mount Ditte, Window Buttress rises to about 800 m (2,600 ft) high. It was named by the United Kingdom Antarctic Place-Names Committee (UK-APC) in 1982, from the window-like structure near the top of the cliff, which is visible only from the southwest.
