= Peter Buchanan (Royal Navy officer) =

Vice-Admiral Sir Peter Buchanan KBE FNI
- Born: 14 May 1925; Isle of Wight
- Died: 23 November 2011 (aged 86); Midhurst
- Military career
- Allegiance: United Kingdom
- Branch: Royal Navy
- Rank: Vice-Admiral
- Commands: HMS Scarborough; HMS Endurance; HMS Devonshire
- Awards: Knight Commander of the Order of the British Empire

Vice-Admiral Sir Peter William Buchanan KBE FNI (14 May 1925 – 23 November 2011) was a Royal Indian Navy and Royal Navy officer who became Naval Secretary.

== Early life ==
Born on the Isle of Wight, he was the second son of Lieutenant Colonel Francis Henry Theodore Buchanan and Gwendolen May Isobel (née Hunt). He was educated at Malvern College.

His brother Leading Aircraftman James Gilliam Buchanan, Royal Air Force Volunteer Reserve, died aged 19 on active service in Arizona, United States in 1943.

== Naval career ==
Buchanan joined the Royal Indian Navy in 1943. During the Second World War he served as a midshipman on HMS Anson and HMS King George V. On the latter ship he fought the Japanese in the Pacific and was in the region when the atomic bombs were dropped on Hiroshima and Nagasaki.

In 1948 Buchanan transferred to the Royal Navy. From 1956 to 1958 he was on the staff of the Britannia Royal Naval College. He served on HMS Birmingham from 1958 to 1960. As Fleet Operations Officer in the Far East from 1963 to 1964 he was Mentioned in Despatches.

From 1965 to 1967 he served on HMS Victorious. Buchanan was given command of HMS Endurance in 1968. He proved that the route now known as the Buchanan Passage can be used to reach Marguerite Bay from the North.

He became Naval Assistant to the Second Sea Lord in 1970. In 1972 he took command of HMS Devonshire, before returning to the Ministry of Defence in 1974 and, having been promoted to rear admiral, becoming Naval Secretary in 1976. Following promotion to vice admiral, he was appointed Chief of Staff, Allied Naval Forces Southern Europe in 1979. He retired in 1982.

== Other ==
Buchanan was admitted as a Younger Brother of Trinity House in 1963. He was knighted in the Queen’s 1980 Birthday Honours, being awarded a KBE.

In 1996 he served as Master of the Guild of Freemen of the City of London. From 1997 to 2010 he was President of RNLI Selsey Lifeboat Station. A stained glass window commemorating his service was unveiled at the station on 4 October 2017 by his widow Lady (Audrey) Buchanan.

Military offices
Preceded by John Forbes	Naval Secretary; 1976–1978	Succeeded by Paul Greening
