= League Rock =

League Rock (67°46′S 69°4′W) is a distinctive rounded rock lying southwest of Box Reef, off the south end of Adelaide Island, Antarctica. It was surveyed by the Royal Navy Hydrographic Survey Unit, 1962–63, and was so named by the UK Antarctic Place-Names Committee because the rock lies one league distant from what was then Adelaide Station.
