= Cono Island =

Island in Antarctica

- Location within Antarctic Peninsula

Geography
- Location: Antarctica
- Coordinates: 67°41′S 69°10′W

Administration
- Administered under the Antarctic Treaty System

Demographics
- Population: Uninhabited

Cono Island is a conspicuous conical island lying south of the Chatos Islands, off the southwest part of Adelaide Island. The feature was descriptively named Islote Cono (cone islet) by the Argentine Antarctic Expedition of 1952–53.

== See also ==
- List of Antarctic and sub-Antarctic islands
