= Reptile Ridge =

Reptile Ridge (67°33′S 68°11′W) is a ridge over 2 nautical miles (3.7 km) long, rising to about 250 m and extending northwest from the vicinity of Rothera Point, Adelaide Island. The name is descriptive of its appearance when viewed in profile from north or south. Named by the United Kingdom Antarctic Place-Names Committee (UK-APC) in 1977.
