= Day Island =

Island in Graham Land, Antarctica

Day Island (67°15′S 67°42′W) is an island that is 7 nautical miles (13 km) long and 3 nautical miles (6 km) wide which is located immediately south of The Gullet.

It is 2 nautical miles (4 km) north of Wyatt Island in the northern part of Laubeuf Fjord, off the west coast of Graham Land in the Antarctic Peninsula.

It was first surveyed in 1936 by the British Graham Land Expedition under John Rymill, who gave it the provisional name Middle Island. It was resurveyed in 1948 by the Falkland Islands Dependencies Survey, who renamed it for Vice Admiral Sir Archibald Day, Hydrographer of the Navy.

== See also ==
- Hinks Channel
- List of Antarctic and sub-Antarctic islands
