= Hansen Island =

Island in Antarctica

Hansen Island Peak

Highest point
- Elevation: 1,160 m (3,810 ft)
- Prominence: 1,160 m (3,810 ft)
- Listing: Ribu

Hansen Island (67°6′S 67°37′W) is an island 6 nautical miles (11 km) long and 3 nautical miles (6 km) wide, lying immediately north of The Gullet at the head of Hanusse Bay, off the west coast of Graham Land, Antarctica. It was first surveyed in 1936 by the British Graham Land Expedition (BGLE) under John Rymill, who used the provisional name "North Island" for this feature. The island was resurveyed in 1948 by the Falkland Islands Dependencies Survey, and was renamed in 1954 by the UK Antarctic Place-Names Committee for Leganger H. Hansen, manager at Messrs. Christian Salvesen's whaling station at Leith Harbor, South Georgia, 1916–37, who gave great assistance to the BGLE, 1934–37.

== See also ==
- List of Antarctic and sub-Antarctic islands
- Neumann Peak
