= Laubeuf Fjord =

Coordinates: 67°20′S 67°50′W

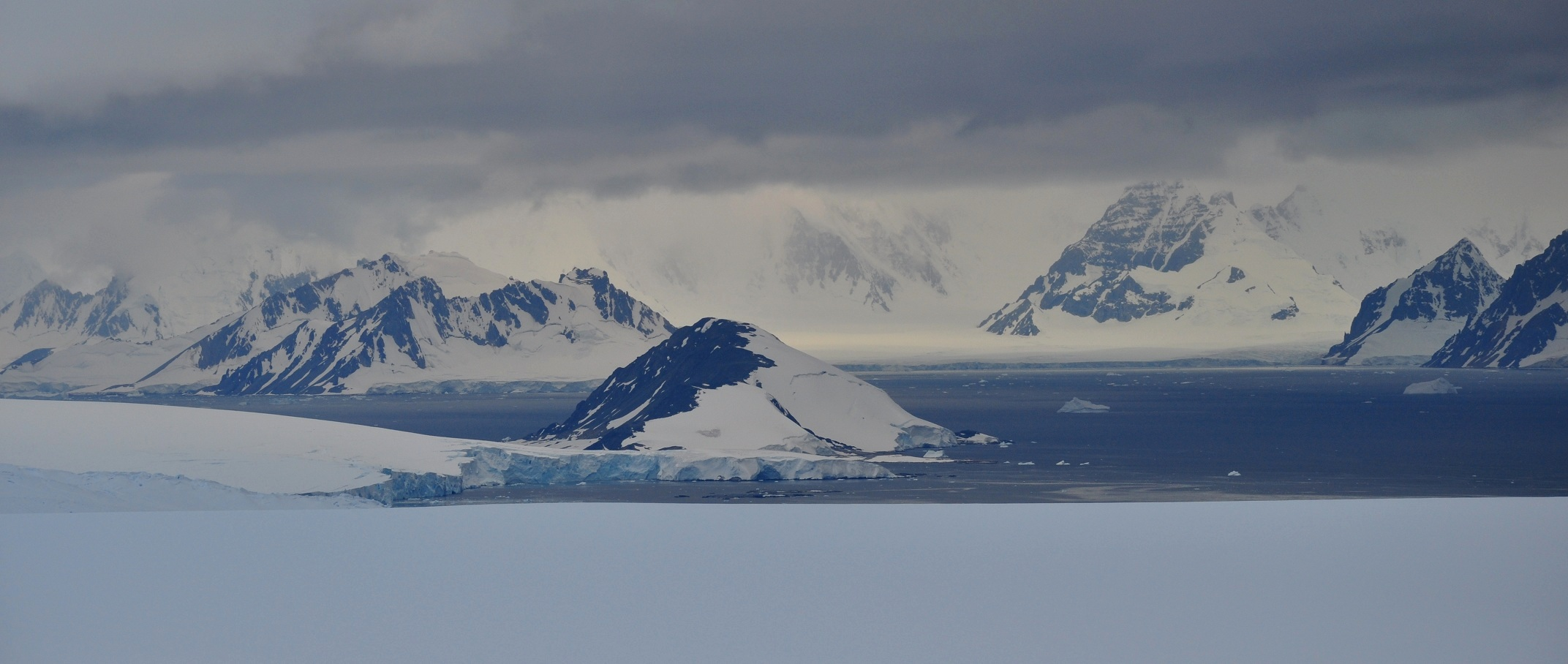
Laubeuf Fjord seen from the Wormald Ice Piedmont on Adelaide Island. In the centre is Webb Island; left of it and further away is Wyatt Island. The mountains in the distance are all on the Arrowsmith Peninsula of the Antarctic mainland, forming the fjord's east coast.

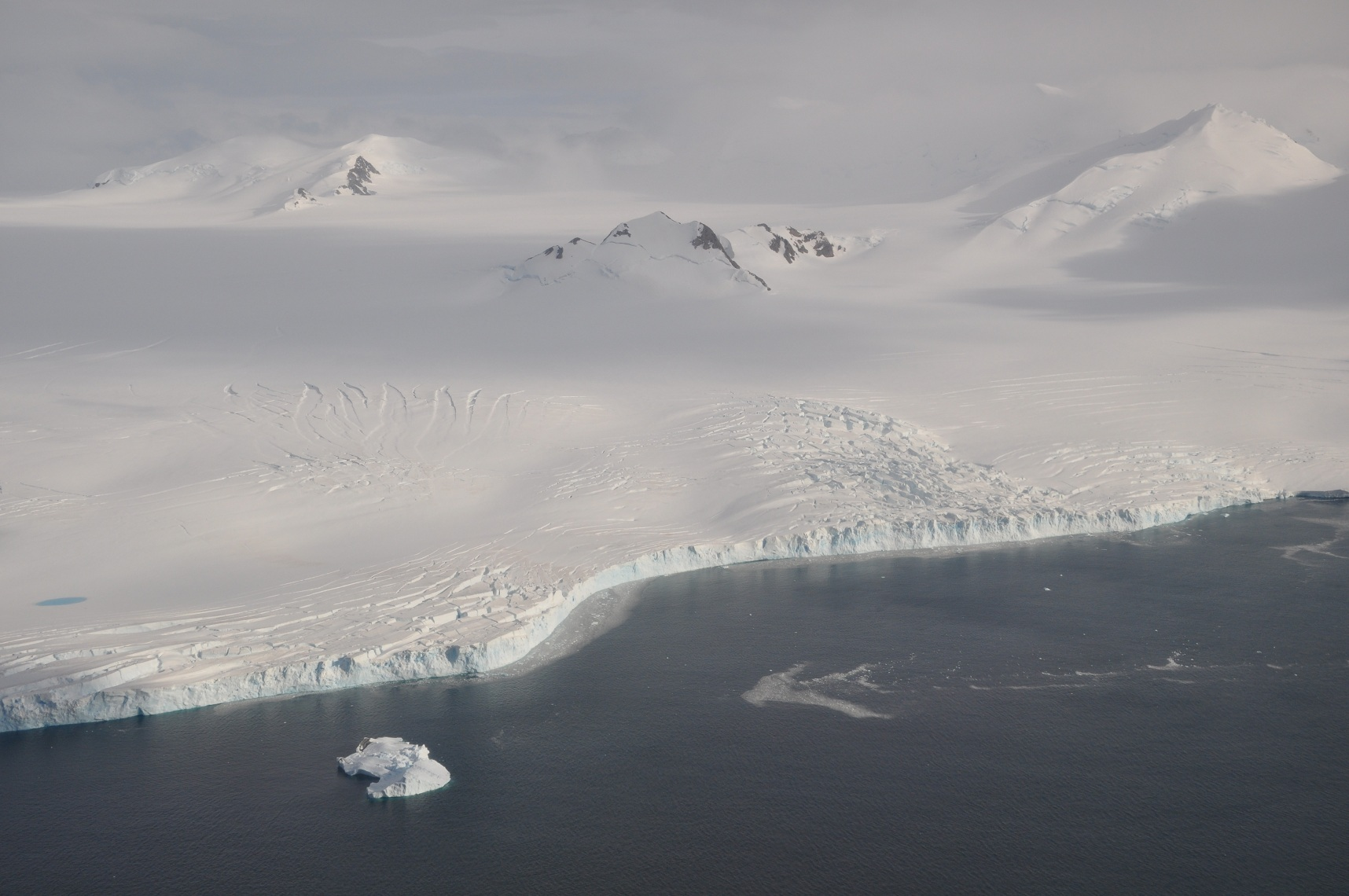
A part of the west coast of Laubeuf Fjord is formed by the ice cliffs of the Wormald Ice Piedmont on the Wright Peninsula of Adelaide Island.

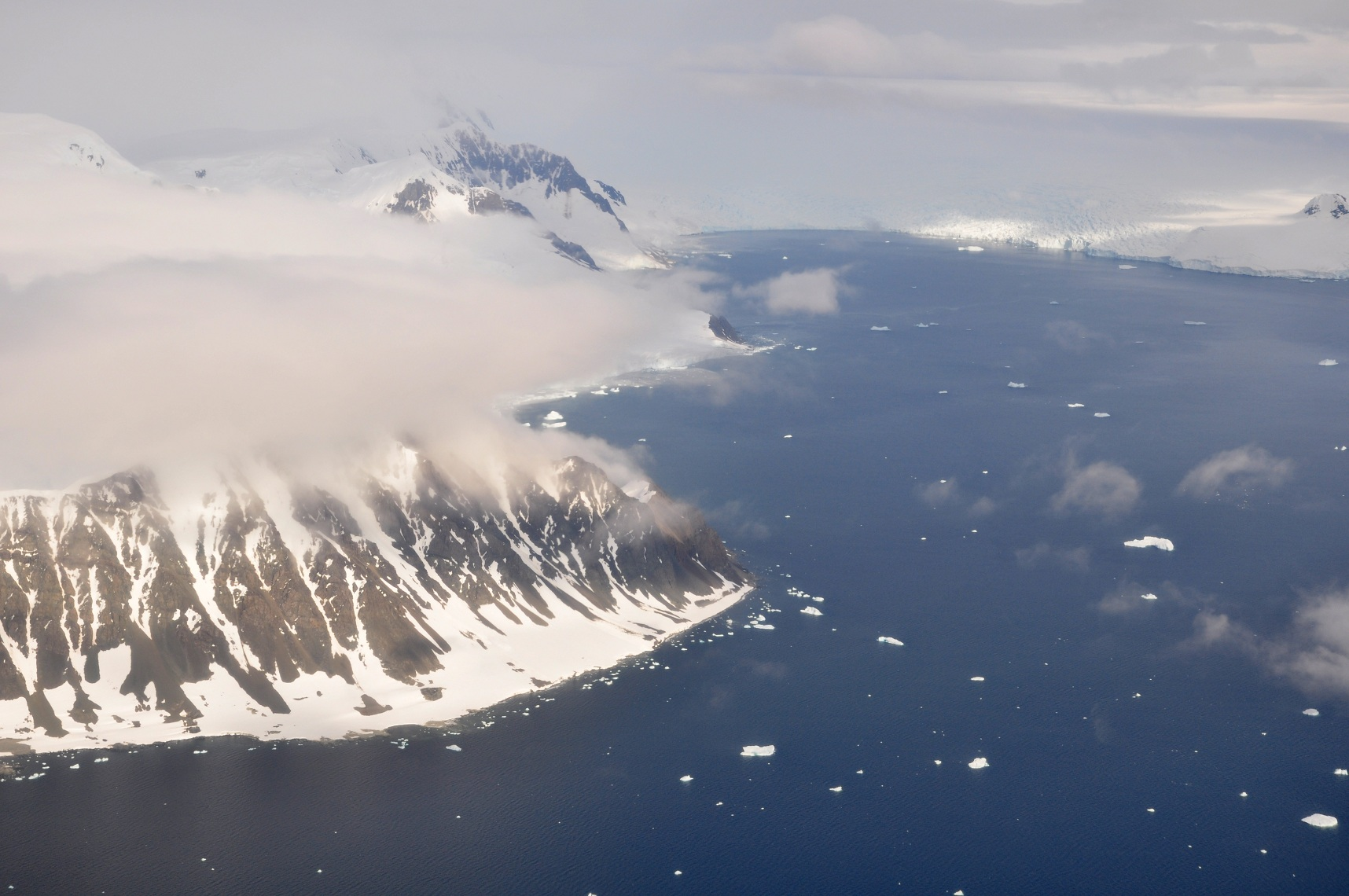
Stonehouse Bay is on the west side of Laubeuf Fjord. In the upper right hand corner is Shambles Glacier. Click on the picture for a description of the other geographical features.

Laubeuf Fjord is a sound in Antarctica, 40 kilometres (25 miles) long in a north-south direction and averaging 16 km (10 mi) wide, lying between the east-central portion of Adelaide Island and the southern part of Arrowsmith Peninsula, Graham Land. It connects Hanusse Bay to the north with Marguerite Bay to the south. The southern 'border' between Laubeuf Fjord and Marguerite Bay is formed by the line between Rothera Point, Adelaide Island, and Cape Sáenz, which is the southernmost point of the Arrowsmith Peninsula. The fjord was discovered by the French Antarctic Expedition, 1908–10, under Jean-Baptiste Charcot, and named by him for Maxime Laubeuf, a French marine engineer who supervised building the engine for the ship Pourquoi-Pas.

There are several islands in Laubeuf Fjord. The largest and northernmost of these is Day Island, followed by Wyatt Island a bit further south. Still further south are the smaller Webb Island and Pinero Island. There are also various very small, mostly rocky islets, such as the Brockhamp Islands, Covey Rocks, Quilp Rock and Killingbeck Island.

Several large glaciers calve into Laubeuf Fjord. From the Arrowsmith Peninsula these are the Ward Glacier, the Vallot Glacier and the Nye Glacier. From Adelaide Island comes the huge Shambles Glacier that terminates in Stonehouse Bay, a large bay on the west side of Laubeuf Fjord.

== See also ==
- Hinks Channel
