= Liard Island =

Island in Graham Land, Antarctica

- Location within Antarctica

Geography
- Location: Antarctica
- Coordinates: 66°51′S 67°25′W
- Length: 24 km (14.9 mi)
- Width: 11 km (6.8 mi)
- Highest elevation: 1,000 m (3000 ft)

Administration
- Administered under the Antarctic Treaty System

Demographics
- Population: Uninhabited

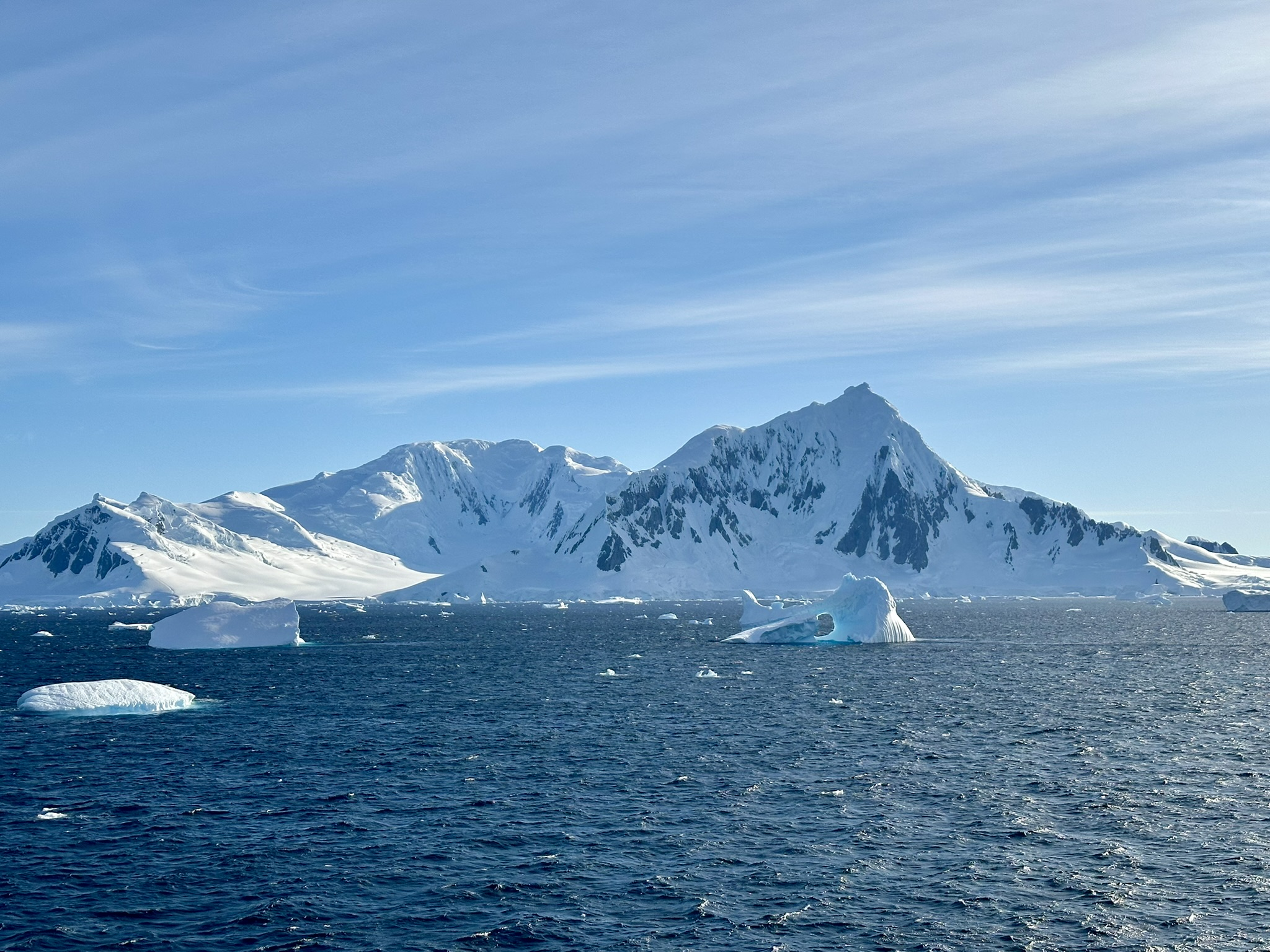
Liard Island seen from NE

Liard Island is a mountainous island, 24 kilometres (13 nmi) long, 11 kilometres (6 nmi) wide and rising to 1,000 metres (3,300 ft), situated in the north-central portion of Hanusse Bay, off the west coast of Graham Land, Antarctica. It was discovered and named by the French Antarctic Expedition, 1908–10, under Jean-Baptiste Charcot.

== See also ==
- Composite Antarctic Gazetteer
- Glen Peak
- List of Antarctic islands south of 60° S
- Mount Bridgman
- Scientific Committee on Antarctic Research
- Territorial claims in Antarctica
