= The Gullet =

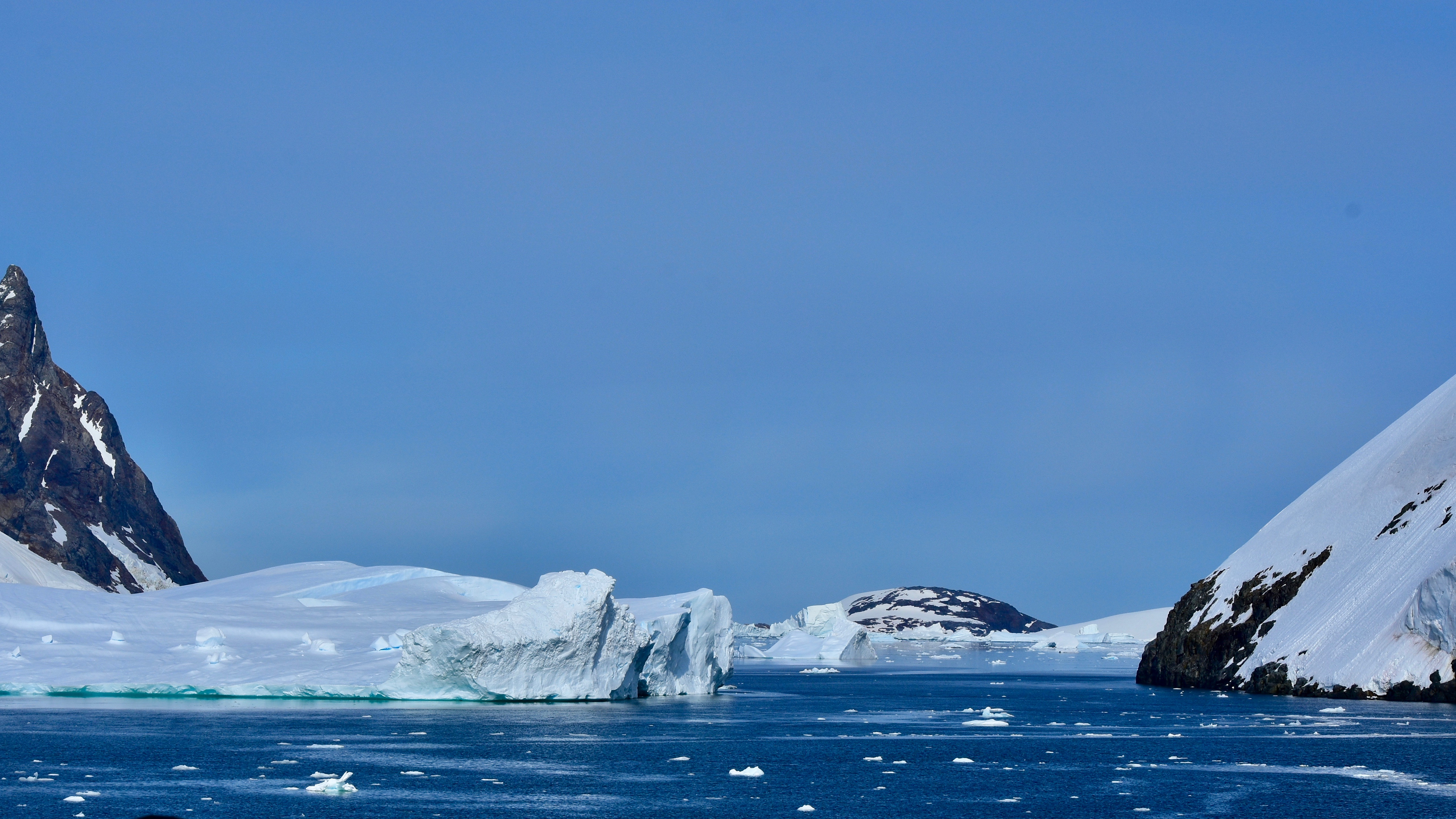
- The northern entrance of the Gullet.

- Location: Antarctica
- Coordinates: 67°10′S 67°38′W
- Type: Channel
- Part of: Southern Ocean

The Gullet is a narrow channel between the eastern extremity of Adelaide Island and the west coast of Graham Land, Antarctica, separating Hansen Island and Day Island and connecting the heads of Hanusse Bay and Laubeuf Fjord. This area was first explored in 1909 by the French Antarctic Expedition under Jean-Baptiste Charcot who, though uncertain of the existence of the channel, sketched its probable position on the charts of the expedition. The channel was first visited and roughly surveyed in 1936 by the British Graham Land Expedition under John Rymill. It was resurveyed and given this descriptive name in 1948 by members of the Falkland Islands Dependencies Survey.

== See also ==
- Hinks Channel
