= Sighing Peak =

Peak in Antarctica

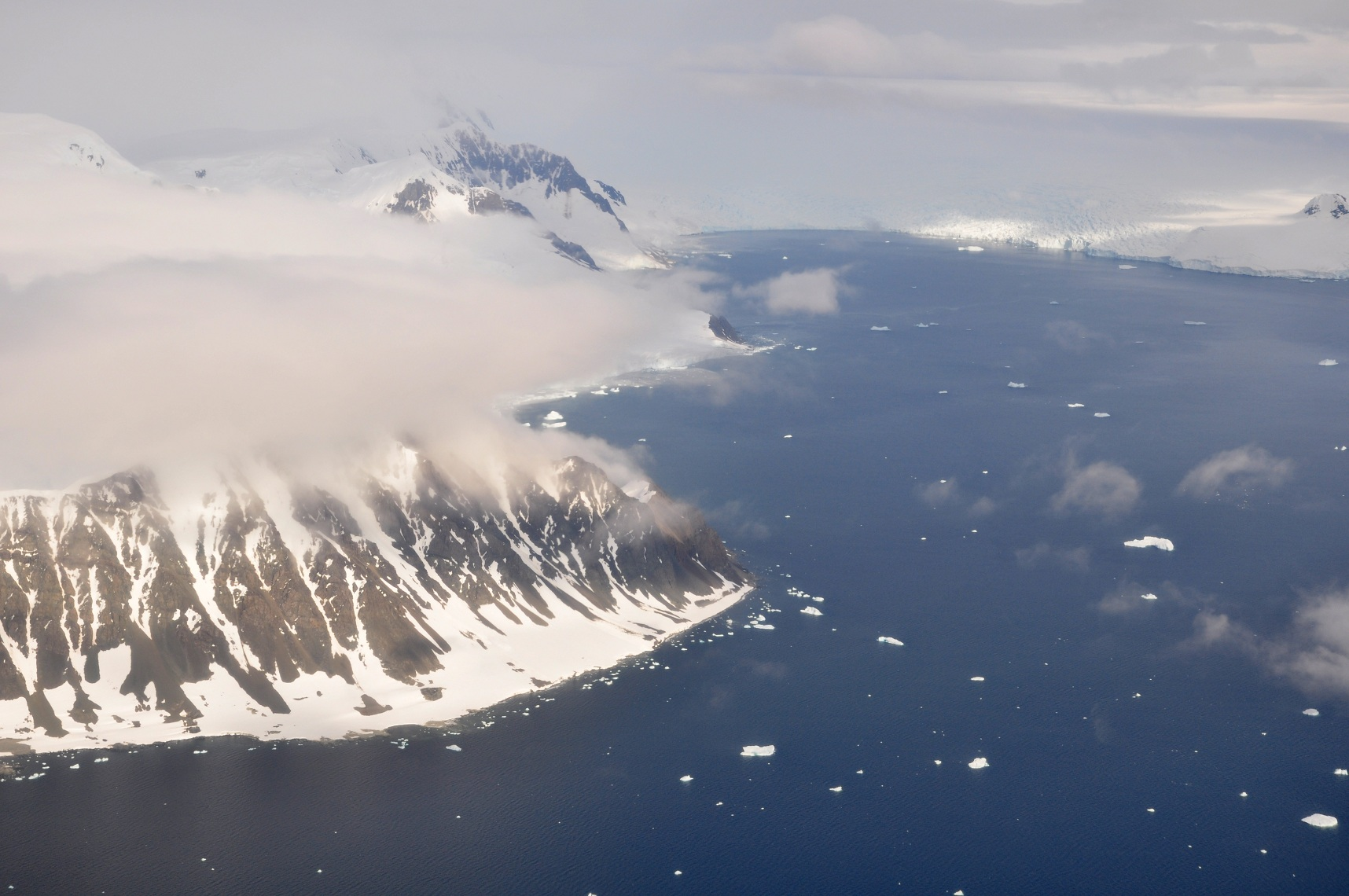
- Sighing Peak is the prominent mountain on the left in this aerial picture of a part of Adelaide Island's east coast.

Highest point
- Elevation: 640 metres (2,100 ft)
- Coordinates: 67°24′S 67°59′W

Geography
- Location within Antarctica
- Location: Antarctica

Sighing Peak is a 640 m (2,100 ft) peak in Antarctica. It is located at the south side of the entrance to Stonehouse Bay on the east side of Adelaide Island. It was first sighted and surveyed in 1909 by the French Antarctic Expedition under Jean-Baptiste Charcot. It was resurveyed in 1948 by the Falkland Islands Dependencies Survey (FIDS) and so named by them because of the persistent sighing of wind from the summit of this peak, even when apparently calm at sea level.

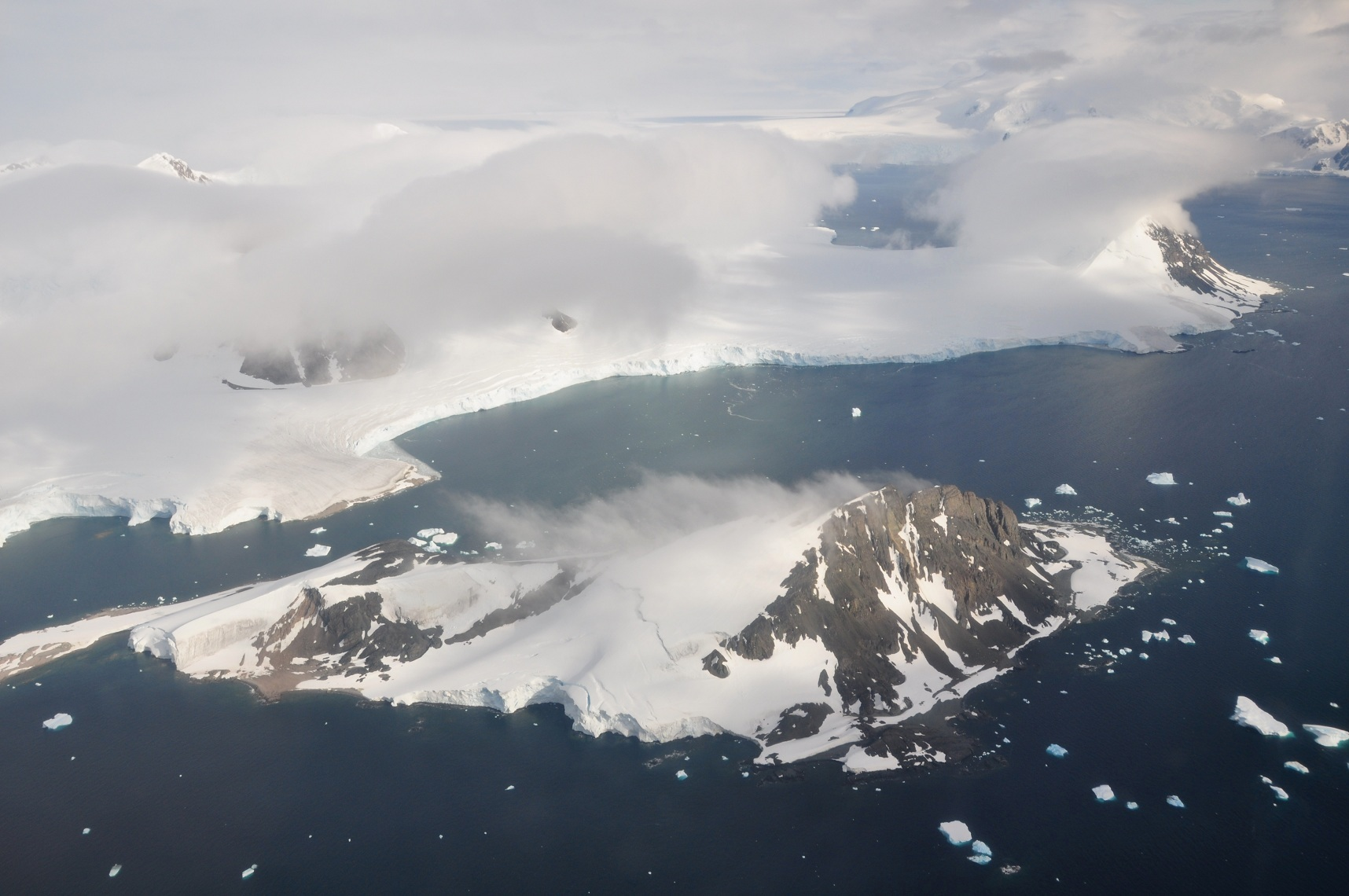
Sighing Peak is the lone cloud-covered mountain on the right. The island in front is Webb Island. Click on the picture for a detailed description of the other geographical features.
