= Killingbeck Island =

Island in Antarctica

- Location within Antarctica

Geography
- Location: Antarctica
- Coordinates: 67°34′S 68°5′W

Administration
- Administered under the Antarctic Treaty System

Demographics
- Population: Uninhabited

Killingbeck Island is a small island lying east of Rothera Point, off the southeast coast of Adelaide Island, Antarctica. It was named by the UK Antarctic Place-Names Committee in 1964 for John B. Killingbeck, a British Antarctic Survey glaciologist in 1960–63.

== See also ==
- List of Antarctic and sub-Antarctic islands
