= Mount Gaudry =

Mountain in Graham Land, Antarctica

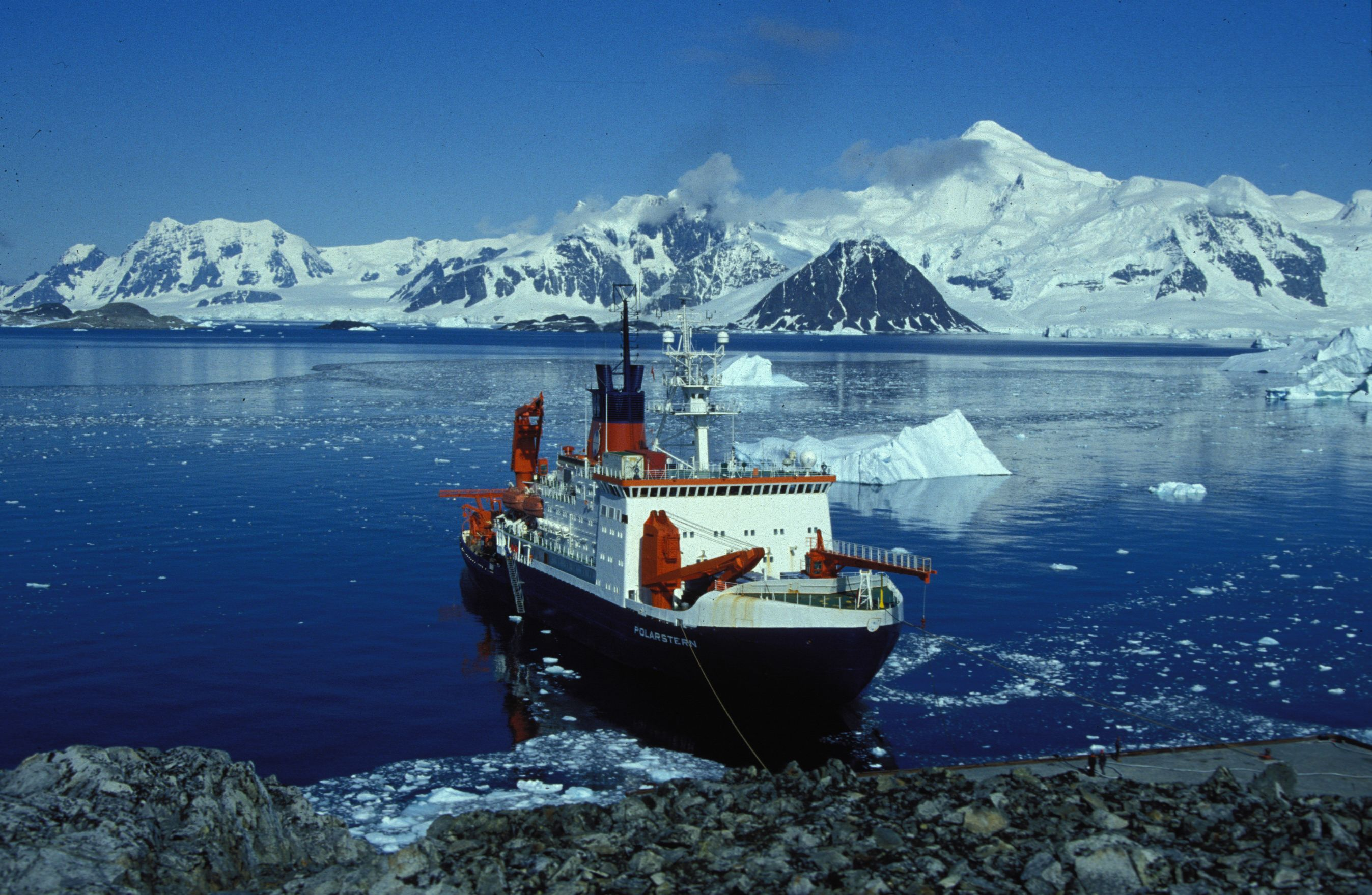

Highest point
- Elevation: 2,560 m (8,400 ft)
- Listing: Ultra, Ribu
- Coordinates: 67°32′S 68°37′W

Geography
- Location within Antarctica
- Location: Adelaide Island, Antarctica

Mount Gaudry is a mountain, either 2,315 metres (7,600 ft) or 2,560 metres (8,400 ft) high, rising close southwest of Mount Barre and 5 nautical miles (9 km) north-northwest of Mount Liotard in the southern part of Adelaide Island, Antarctica. It was discovered by the French Antarctic Expedition, 1903–05, under Jean-Baptiste Charcot, who named it after Albert Gaudry, a prominent French paleontologist.

== See also ==
- List of ultras of Antarctica
- List of islands by highest point
