= Wyatt Island =

Island in Graham Land, Antarctica

Geography
- Location: Graham Land, Antarctica
- Adjacent to: Southern Ocean
- Area: 21.3 km^{2} (8.2 sq mi)
- Coastline: 23 km (14.3 mi)

Demographics
- Population: 0

Wyatt Island (67°20′S 67°40′W) is an island, 5 nautical miles (9.3 km; 5.8 mi) long and 2 nautical miles (3.7 km; 2.3 mi) wide, lying 2 nautical miles (3.7 km; 2.3 mi) south of Day Island near the center of Laubeuf Fjord, off the west coast of Graham Land. First surveyed in 1936 by the British Graham Land Expedition (BGLE) under Rymill which used the provisional name South Island for this feature. The island was resurveyed in 1948 by the Falkland Islands Dependencies Survey (FIDS) and was renamed by Vice Admiral Sir Arthur G. N. Wyatt, Hydrographer to the Navy, 1945–1950.

== See also ==
- Hinks Channel
- List of Antarctic and sub-Antarctic islands
