= Piñero Island =

Island in Graham Land, Antarctica

- Location within Antarctica

Geography
- Location: Antarctica
- Coordinates: 67°34′S 67°49′W
- Length: 3.7 km (2.3 mi)
- Width: 0.9 km (0.56 mi)

Administration
- Administered under the Antarctic Treaty System

Demographics
- Population: Uninhabited

Piñero Island is an island, 3.7 km (2 nmi) long and 0.9 km (0.5 nmi) wide, lying about 8.3 km (4.5 nmi) northwest of Pourquoi Pas Island, off the west coast of Graham Land. It was discovered by the French Antarctic Expedition under J.B. Charcot, 1908–10, and named by him for Dr. Antonio F. Piñero, member of the Chamber of Deputies of the Argentine Republic, on whose motion the government voted unlimited credit to meet the needs of the expedition. The highest point in the island is Piñero Peak.

== See also ==
- List of Antarctic and sub-Antarctic islands
- Quilp Rock an isolated rock 6.5 kilometres (3.5 nmi) south-southeast of the south tip of Pinero Island
