= Stonehouse Bay =

Bay in Antarctica

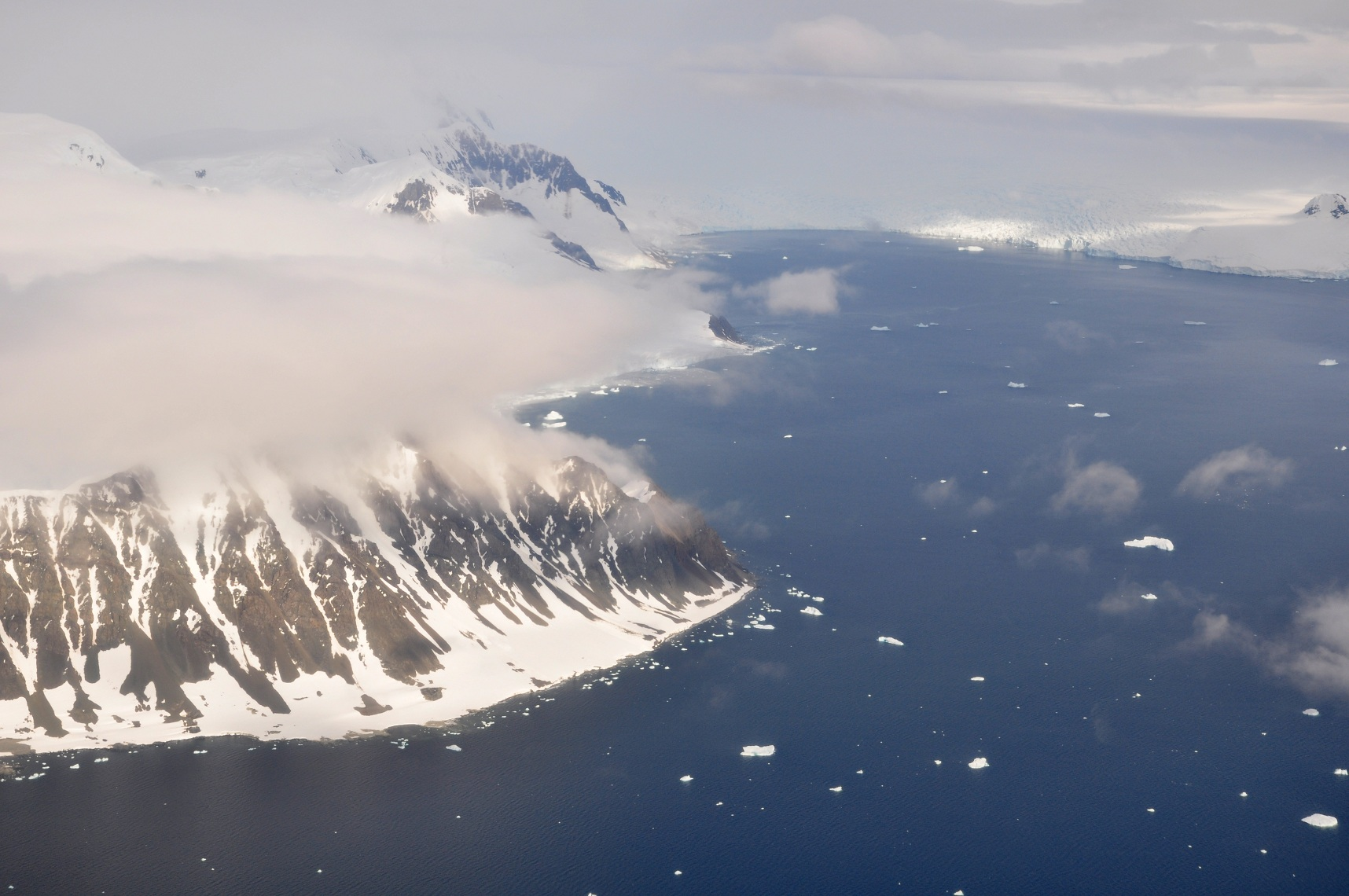
Stonehouse Bay is the large body of water on the right in this aerial picture of a part of Adelaide Island's east coast. Click on the picture for a detailed description of the other geographical features.

Stonehouse Bay (67°21′S 68°5′W) is a bay in Antarctica on the west side of Laubeuf Fjord, indenting the east coast of Adelaide Island between Hunt Peak and Sighing Peak. The bay is 5 nautical miles (9 km) wide. It was first sighted and surveyed in January 1909 by the French Antarctic Expedition under Jean-Baptiste Charcot. The bay was named for Bernard Stonehouse of the Falkland Islands Dependencies Survey (FIDS), a meteorologist in 1947-48 and biologist in 1949 at Stonington Island and leader of the FIDS sledge party which resurveyed the bay in 1948.

Adelaide Island's largest glacier, the Shambles Glacier, calves into Stonehouse Bay.
