= Léonie Islands =

Group of islands in Antarctica

- Location within Antarctica

Geography
- Location: Antarctica
- Coordinates: 67°36′S 68°17′W

Administration
- Administered under the Antarctic Treaty System

Demographics
- Population: Uninhabited

The Léonie Islands are a group of small islands lying in the entrance to Ryder Bay along the southeast side of Adelaide Island, Antarctica. The French Antarctic Expedition, 1908–10, under Jean-Baptiste Charcot, discovered these islands and gave the name Léonie Island to the largest island in the group. The British Graham Land Expedition under John Rymill, 1934–37, extended the coverage of the name to the entire group.

== See also ==
- List of Antarctic and sub-Antarctic islands
