= Avian Island =

Island in Antarctica

- Location within Antarctica

Geography
- Location: Antarctica
- Coordinates: 67°46′15″S 68°53′10″W

Administration
- Administered under the Antarctic Treaty System

Demographics
- Population: Uninhabited

Avian Island is an island, 1.2 km (0.7 mi) long and 40 metres (130 ft) high, lying close off the south tip of Adelaide Island, Antarctica. It was discovered by the French Antarctic Expedition, 1908–10, under Jean-Baptiste Charcot, and visited in 1948 by the Falkland Islands Dependencies Survey, who so named it because of the large number and variety of birds (avians) found there.

== Birds ==
The island has been identified as an Important Bird Area by BirdLife International because it supports a large breeding colony of Adélie penguins (35,000 pairs), as well as imperial shags (670 pairs), south polar skuas (880 pairs), southern giant petrels (250 pairs), kelp gulls and Wilson's storm petrels. It also holds the southernmost record of breeding brown skuas. The island is protected as Antarctic Specially Protected Area (ASPA) No.117 for its outstanding ornithological significance.

== Skeen Rocks ==
To the south are Skeen Rocks, (67°47′S 68°54′W), two rocks which were named by the United Kingdom Antarctic Place-Names Committee (UK-APC) for Lieutenant Michael G.C. Skeen, Royal Navy, officer in charge of the helicopter flight, HMS charting this area in 1961–63.

== See also ==
- List of Antarctic and subantarctic islands
