= Hanusse Bay =

Bay in Graham Land, Antarctica

Coordinates: 66°57′S 67°30′W

Hanusse Bay is a broad, V-shaped bay, off the west coast of Graham Land, Antarctica. The bay is 37 kilometres (20 nmi) long and trends generally north–south. It is bordered by Cape Mascart on Anvers Island, and Shmidt Point on Arrowsmith Peninsula, Loubet Coast. At its north entrance, Isacke Passage separates it from Liard Island. It is bounded to the south by a line from Landauer Point, the north point of Hansen Island and Bagnold Point on Arrowsmith Peninsula.

The bay was discovered and first charted by the French Antarctic Expedition, 1908–10, under Jean-Baptiste Charcot, and named by him for the director of the Hydrographic Service of the French Navy Ferdinand Isidore Hanusse (1848–1921). Isacke Passage was also charted Charcot's expedition. It was named by the UK Antarctic Place-Names Committee for Captain Christopher J. Isacke, Royal Navy, commanding officer of HMS Endurance in the Antarctic Peninsula area, 1972–74.
