= Adelaide Island =

Island in Antarctica

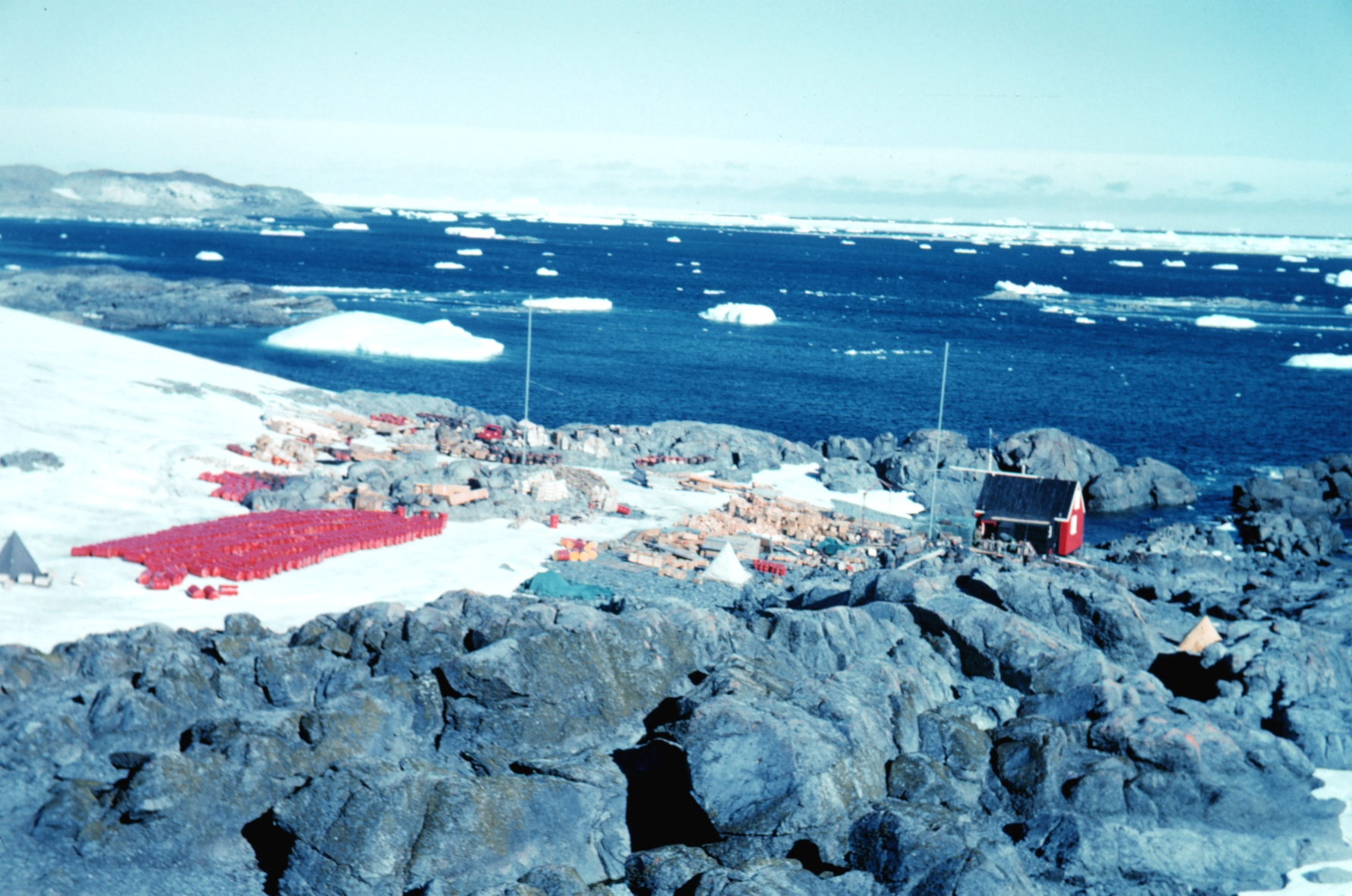
- Adelaide Base, February 1962

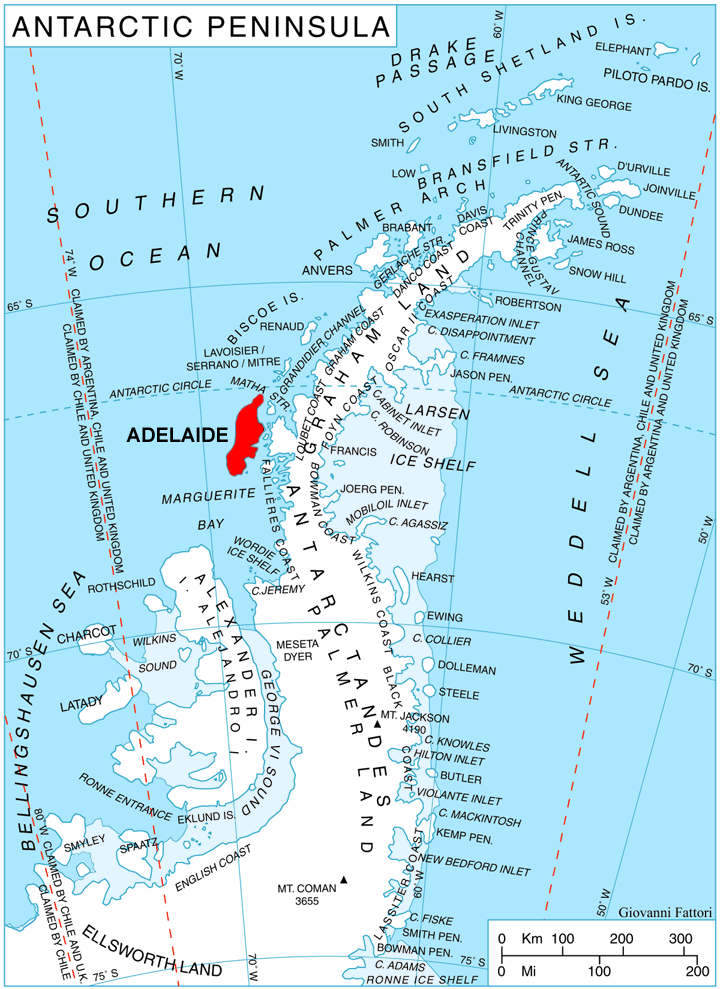
- Adelaide Island shown within the Antarctic Peninsula

Geography
- Location: northeast Bellingshausen Sea, Southern Ocean
- Coordinates: 67°13′S 68°23′W
- Area: 4,663 km^{2} (1,800 sq mi)
- Length: 139 km (86.4 mi)
- Width: 37 km (23 mi)
- Highest elevation: 2,315 m (7595 ft)
- Highest point: Mount Gaudry

Administration
- Administered under the Antarctic Treaty System

Demographics
- Population: around 100

Adelaide Island is a large, mainly ice-covered island, 139 kilometres (75 nmi) long and 37 kilometres (20 nmi) wide, lying at the north side of Marguerite Bay off the west coast of the Antarctic Peninsula. The Ginger Islands lie off the southern end. Mount Bodys is the easternmost mountain on Adelaide Island, rising to over 1,220 m. The island lies within the Argentine, British and Chilean Antarctic claims.

== History ==
Adelaide Island was discovered in 1832 by a British expedition under John Biscoe. The island was first surveyed by the French Antarctic Expedition (1908–1910) under Jean-Baptiste Charcot.

According to a contemporary source, the island was named by Biscoe himself in honour of Queen Adelaide of the United Kingdom, who earlier gave her name to the city in Australia.

The Island has two bases on it. The old Adelaide Island base (also known as Base T) was set up by the Falkland Islands Dependencies Survey (FIDS), which later became the British Antarctic Survey. The Base was closed due to an unstable skiway and operations were moved to the new Rothera Research Station during 1976-77; this base remains open. The old BAS base was transferred to the Chilean authorities in 1984, when it was renamed Teniente Luis Carvajal Villaroel Antarctic Base. The station was then used as a summer only station by the Chileans. However, the skiway and 'ramp' to the station from the plateau have all become so unstable that the Chilean Air Force (FACh) have ceased operating there. The Chilean Navy has visited the station almost every summer to ensure it is in good keeping. BAS employees also visit the station during the winter when access from the plateau is easier.

Due to the length of time that it has been inhabited, the island is well mapped by Antarctic standards.

== Geology ==
During the Mesozoic, the Antarctic Peninsula was the site of an active volcanic arc, with deposition of a fore-arc basin sequence. Included in that sequence is a 2–3 km succession of turbiditic coarse sandstones and volcanic rocks, exposed on the eastern portion of Adelaide Island, which correlates with the Upper Jurassic-Lower Cretaceous Fossil Bluff Group on Alexander Island. The western portion of Adelaide Island is covered by the Fuchs Ice Piedmont. The oldest formation on Adelaide Island is the Late Jurassic Buchia Buttress Formation (149.5 Ma) of volcanic breccias, tuffs, and volcaniclastic rocks interbedded with coarse-grained sandstones and pebble conglomerates. The Early Cretaceous Milestone Bluff Formation (113.9 Ma) is a sandstone-conglomerate indicating a shallowing trend. Volcanic formations on Adelaide Island include the Bond Nunatak Formation (75 Ma), which consists of basaltic andesite lavas interbedded with coarse-grained volcaniclastics, and overlays the Buchia Buttress Formation. The Mount Leotard Formation (75-65 Ma), has up to 1800 m of basaltic andesite lavas, hyaloclastites and breccias. The Reptile Ridge Formation (67.6 Ma) is a rhyolitic ignimbrite up to 400 m thick. Finally, the Adelaide Island Intrusive Suite (45-52 Ma) are granodiorite-gabbro hybrid plutons with minor dolerite dykes.

== Geography ==
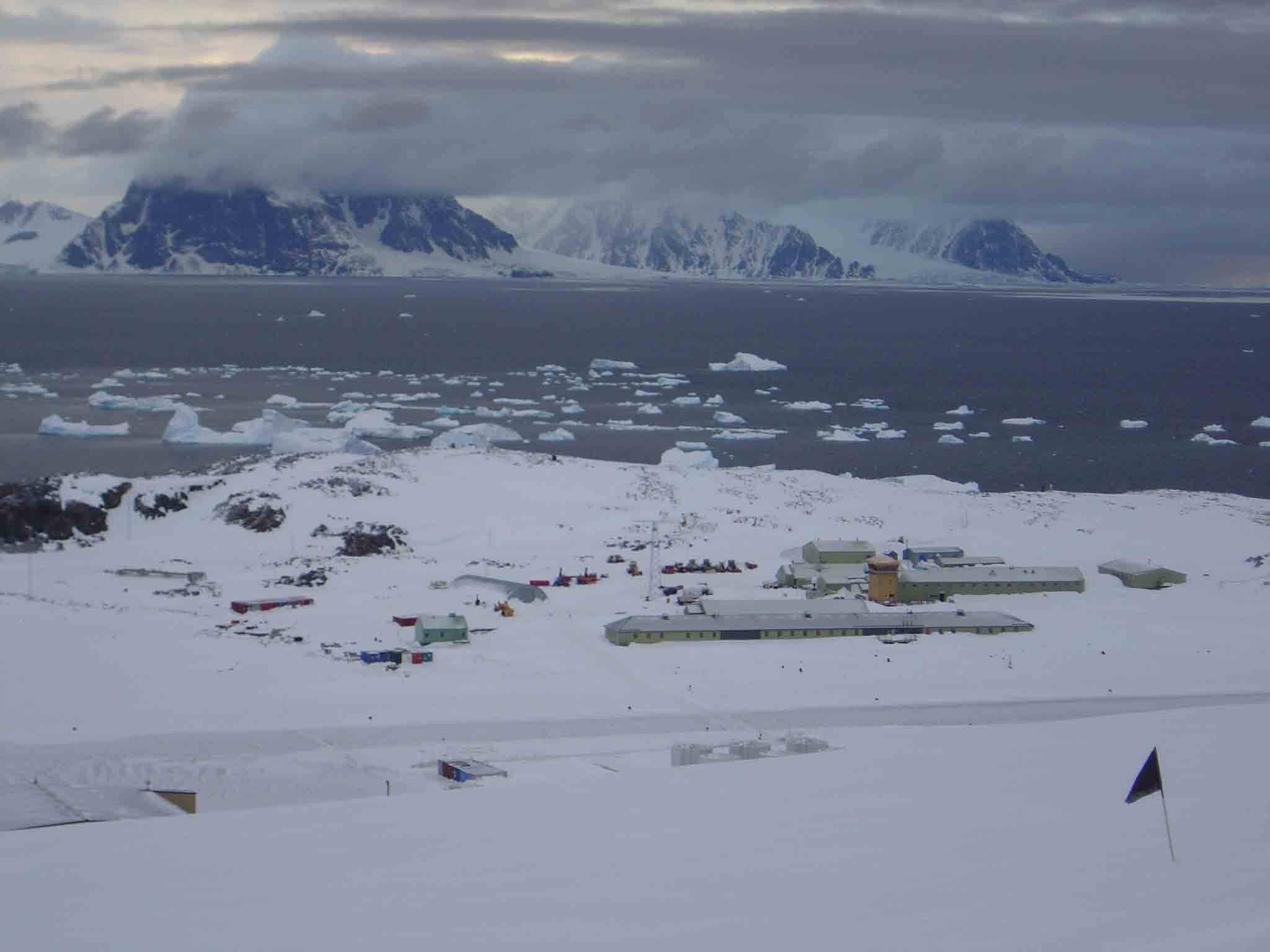
Rothera Station in November 2003, looking towards the Antarctic Peninsula

A number of features on and around Adelaide Island have been charted by various Antarctic expeditions, primarily the French Antarctic Expedition of 1909, under Charcot.

Cape Mascart forms the northernmost extremity of Adelaide Island, Antarctica, and is by the IHO regarded as the northernmost and easternmost border point of Bellingshausen Sea. It was discovered by Charcot's expedition, and named by him for French physicist Éleuthère Mascart.

On the island's east coast, Landauer Point, marks the west side of the north entrance to Tickle Channel. It was mapped by the FIDS from air photos taken by the Ronne Antarctic Research Expedition (RARE), 1947–48, and the Falkland Islands and Dependencies Aerial Survey Expedition (FIDASE), 1956–57. The point was named by the UK Antarctic Place-Names Committee (UK-APC) for Joseph K. Landauer, an American physicist.

To the south is Mothes Point, 7 nautical miles (13 km) southwest of The Gullet. It was mapped by FIDS from RARE photos, and FIDASE in 1956–57. It was named by UK-APC for German glaciologist Hans Mothes.

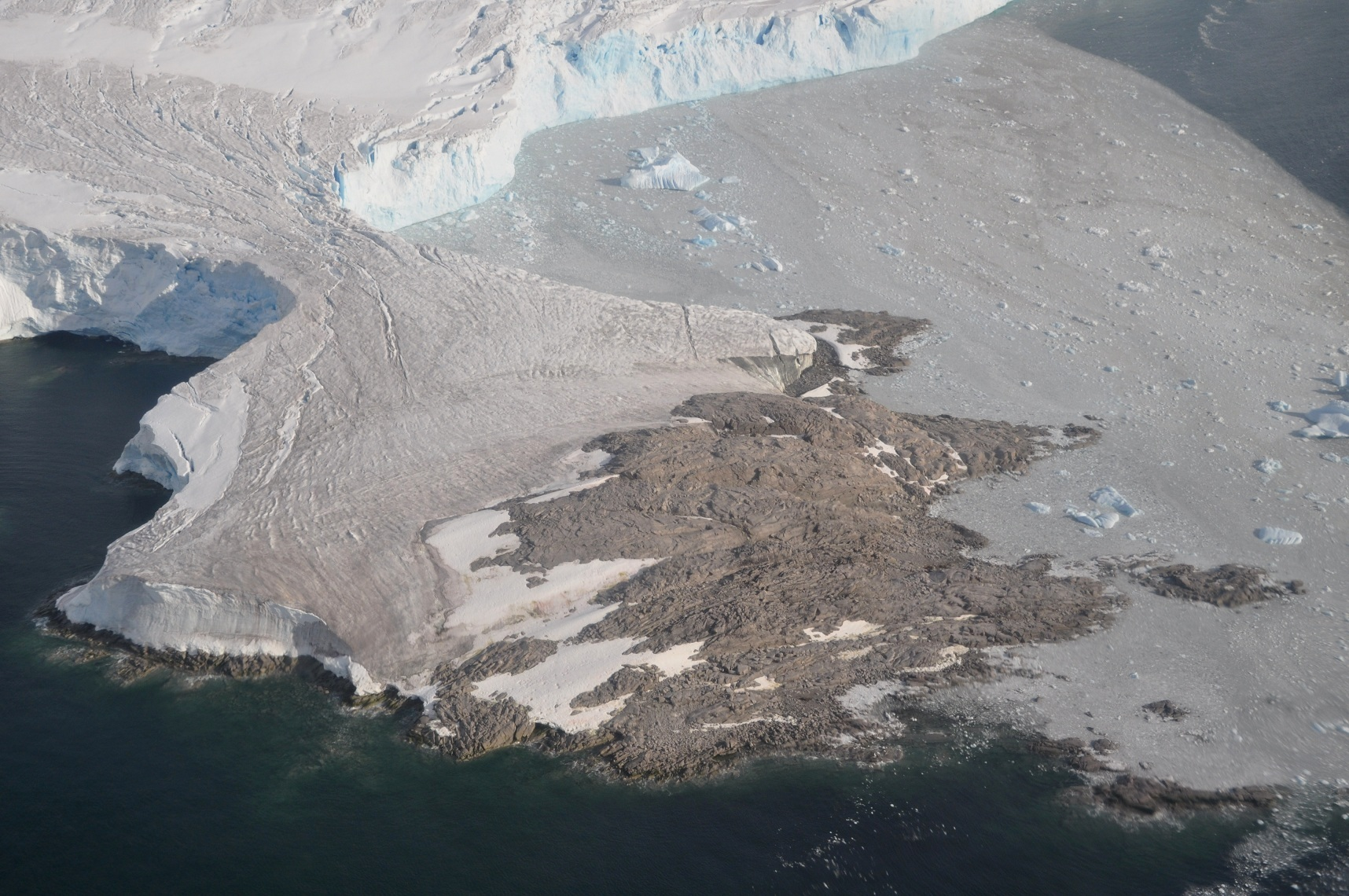
Mackay Point in February 2011.

Continuing south, is Mackay Point about 2 nautical miles (4 km) to the north-northeast of Rothera Point. It was surveyed by FIDS, 1961–62, and by a Royal Navy Hydrographic Survey Unit from HMS Endurance, 1976–77. The point was named by UK-APC in 1978 for BAS builder Donald C. Mackay. The Mackay Point is a tiny peninsula (450 m at its widest point) protruding into Laubeuf Fjord from the Wormald Ice Piedmont on the eastern side of Adelaide Island.

About 2 nmi (3.7 km) south is Rothera Point, marking the east side of the Ryder Bay. Rothera Point was named by UK-APC for FIDS surveyor John M. Rothera. The point is protected as Antarctic Specially Protected Area (ASPA) No.129 so that it would serve as a biological research site and control area against which the environmental impact of the adjacent Rothera Research Station could be monitored in an Antarctic fellfield ecosystem.

On the southeast coast of the island, 5 nmi (9.3 km) east of Mount Gaudry, 6 nmi (11 km) wide Ryder Bay indents the coast to a depth of 4 nmi (7.4 km). The Leonie Islands lie across the mouth of this bay. The bay was resurveyed in 1936 by the British Graham Land Expedition (BGLE) under Rymill, and in 1948 by FIDS. The bay is named for Lisle C.D. Ryder, second mate on the Penola during the BGLE, 1934–37. Ives Bank is a submarine bank in the Bellingshausen Sea on the southern approaches to Ryder Bay.

The southeast extremity of the island is Cape Alexandra, named by Charcot for Alexandra of Denmark, then Queen consort of the United Kingdom.

The southwest extremity of the island is Cape Adriasola, a distinctive ice-cliffed cape. Charcot named it for an acquaintance in Punta Arenas. 10 nautical miles (19 km; 12 mi) southwest lies Avian Island. Several rocks lie off Adriasola: 13 nautical miles (24 km) southwest is Cavalier Rock, named by UK-APC for Royal Navy helicopter pilot Geoffrey A. Cavalier. Sorpresa Rock lies exposed to the southwest. Its name appears on a Chilean government chart of 1947, from "sorpresa", a Spanish word meaning "surprise".

== See also ==
- List of Antarctic and subantarctic islands
- Adelaide (disambiguation)
