= Idun (icebreaker) =

Swedish icebreaker

History
- Name: Polar Pevek (2006–2022); Polar Circle (2022–2024); Idun (2024–present)
- Owner: GC Rieber Shipping (50% in 2006–2023; 100% in 2023–2024); Primorsk Shipping Corporation (50%; 2006–2015); Maas Capital Offshore (50%; 2015–2023); Swedish Maritime Administration (2024–present)
- Port of registry: Limassol, Cyprus (2006); Kholmsk, Russia (2006–2022); Limassol, Cyprus (2022–2024); Norrköping, Sweden (2024–present)
- Ordered: 17 February 2004
- Builder: Aker Tulcea SA, (Tulcea, Romania; hull); Aker Yards AS Langsten (Tomrefjord, Norway; outfitting)
- Yard number: 199
- Laid down: 16 March 2005
- Launched: 18 October 2005
- Sponsored by: Joanne Marie Harley
- Christened: 2 June 2006
- Completed: 27 June 2006
- In service: 2006–2022 (in Russia); 2025 onwards (in Sweden)
- Identification: IMO number: 9319997; MMSI number: 265054000; Call sign: SBCK
- Status: In service

General characteristics
- Type: Icebreaker
- Tonnage: 3,396 GT; 1,019 NT; 1,300 DWT
- Length: 74.36 m (244 ft)
- Beam: 17 m (56 ft)
- Draft: 6.135 m (20 ft) (design)
- Ice class: DNV Icebreaker ICE-10
- Installed power: 4 × Bergen C25:33L9A (4 × 2,505 kW)
- Propulsion: Diesel-electric; Two ABB Azipod units (2 × 5 MW); Bow thruster (700 kW)
- Speed: 12 knots (22 km/h; 14 mph) (service)
- Crew: Accommodation for 18

Idun is a Swedish icebreaker. The ship was built in 2006 as Polar Pevek and stationed at the De-Kastri terminal in the Russian Far East. Following the Russian invasion of Ukraine in 2022, the vessel's Norwegian owner withdrew from Russia and renamed it Polar Circle. In 2024, the Swedish Maritime Administration decided to acquire the ship.

== Design ==
Idun is 74.36 metres (244 ft) long overall and 64.45 metres (211 ft) between perpendiculars, and has a beam of 17 metres (56 ft) and draft of 6.135 metres (20 ft). The vessel is classified as an icebreaker with DNV's ice class ICE-10. The vessel is equipped with a towing winch in both bow and stern, fire-fighting equipment for extinguishing fires onboard other ships, a 300-square-metre (3,200 sq ft) cargo deck, and accommodation for 18 persons.

Idun has a diesel-electric power plant with four nine-cylinder Bergen C25:33L9A medium-speed main diesel generators rated at 2,505 kilowatts (3,359 hp) each, two 1,440-kilowatt (1,930 hp) Cummins QSK60-M auxiliary diesel generators, and a 310-kilowatt (420 hp) Cummins QSM11 emergency diesel generator. The icebreaker is propelled by two 5-megawatt (6,700 hp) ABB Azipod azimuth thrusters that produce a bollard pull of 115 tonnes-force (127 short tons-force; 1,130 kN) in ahead and 95 tonnes-force (105 short tons-force; 930 kN) in astern direction, and enable the vessel to break up to 1.5 metres (4.9 ft) thick ice. In addition, Idun has a 700-kilowatt (940 hp) bow thruster for maneuvering. The icebreaker's service speed in ice-free waters is 12 knots (22 km/h; 14 mph).

== Career ==
=== Development and construction ===
The icebreaker is based on the MM65 ICE design developed by the Norwegian ship designer Multi Maritime. One of the ship's designers described the vessel having the most complicated hull form they had ever made.

The hull was built by Aker Tulcea SA in Tulcea, Romania and towed to Aker Yards AS Langsten in Tomrefjord, Norway for outfitting. The keel of the ship was laid on 16 March 2005 and the vessel was launched on 18 October 2005. The ship was given the name Polar Pevek (Russian: Полар Певек) on 2 June 2006 with Joanne Marie Harley as its sponsor. The ship was delivered to the 50/50 joint venture between GC Rieber Shipping and Primorsk Shipping Corporation on 27 June 2006.

=== Polar Pevek (2006–2022) ===
Few months after delivery, Polar Pevek was reflagged to Russia and stationed at the De-Kastri terminal where the icebreaker's primary task was to assist shuttle tankers transporting oil from the Sakhalin-I project.

In 2015, Primorsk Shipping Corporation sold its 50% ownership share of the vessel to Maas Capital Offshore, a wholly owned investment fund of the Netherlands-based ABN AMRO Bank N.V..

In September 2021, Polar Pevek's original 15-year charter with Exxon Neftegas was extended by two years until September 2023.

Shortly after the Russian invasion of Ukraine on 24 February 2022, GC Rieber Shipping started the process of exiting its business in Russia. In June 2022, the company terminated Polar Pevek's charter ahead of schedule and the vessel departed Russia.

=== Polar Circle (2022–2024) ===
After having been reflagged to Cyprus and given a new name, Polar Circle sailed from the Russian Far East through the Panama Canal and, during the second half of 2022, visited various cities along the Atlantic coast of the United States and Canada. Afterwards, the vessel headed to Norway for lay-up.

In February 2023, GC Rieber Shipping acquired the full ownership of Polar Circle after entering into an agreement with the joint venture partner, Maas Capital Offshore, to purchase its 50% share of the vessel.

=== Idun (2024 onwards) ===
In December 2023, the Swedish Maritime Administration issued a request for tender for the acquisition of an existing icebreaker from the second-hand market to provide relief to the oldest and smallest Swedish state-owned icebreaker, the 1973-built Ale, which typically accumulates the most operating hours during the Baltic Sea winter navigating season. Following the selection of Polar Circle as the winner, the icebreaker was brought to the Bothnian Bay for icebreaking trials in early March after which the Swedish Maritime Administration decided to purchase the vessel. The vessel will be drydocked before the next icebreaking season and fitted with a towing notch in the stern.

In April 2024, the Swedish Maritime Administration announced that the new icebreaker would be named Idun after Iðunn, the goddess associated with apples and youth in the Norse mythology. The new name would continue the tradition of naming Swedish icebreakers after the Norse gods and reflect how the 2006-built vessel, much younger than the other Swedish icebreakers, would begin rejuvenating the Swedish Maritime Administration's fleet. It was also the first Swedish icebreaker to receive a female name.

On 9 March 2025, Idun entered service with a short ceremony. The first assistance took place the following day when the icebreaker helped the timber ship Lappland through the ice into the port of Karlsborg.
