= Launch Rock =

Launch Rock (67°46′S 68°56′W) is a submerged rock lying southwest of the Glover Rocks, off the south end of Adelaide Island, Antarctica. It was named by the UK Antarctic Place-Names Committee to commemorate the unnamed launch from RRS John Biscoe that was used by the Hydrographic Survey Unit which charted this area in 1963.
