= RRS Bransfield =

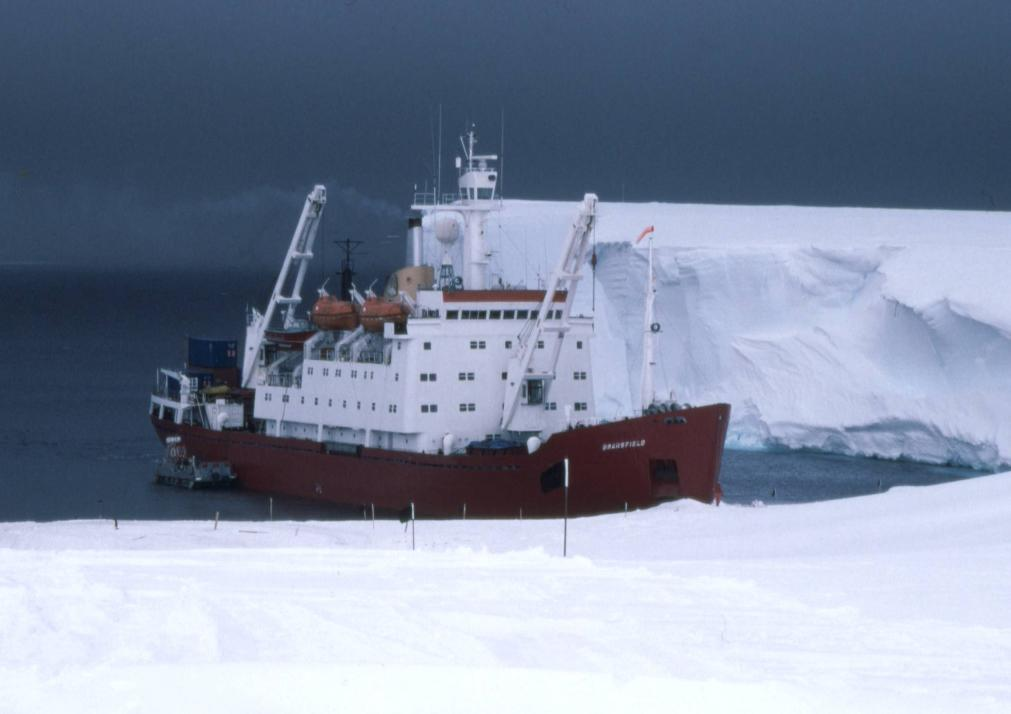
- RRS Bransfield

History

United Kingdom
- Name: RRS Bransfield
- Namesake: Edward Bransfield
- Owner: NERC
- Operator: British Antarctic Survey
- Port of registry: Port Stanley, Falkland Islands
- Route: Antarctic Research and Logistics
- Builder: Robb Caledon Shipbuilders Ltd, Leith
- Yard number: 508
- Launched: 4 September 1970 by Lady Joyce Fuchs, wife of the then Director of the Survey
- Identification: IMO number: 7029079; callsign: ZDLG
- Fate: Sold to GC Rieber Shipping in 1999
- Renamed: Igenpearl in October 1999
- Fate: broken up in Mumbai in 2000

General characteristics
- Class & type: Royal Research Ship; (Research/Survey/Cargo)
- Type: Ice Strengthened, steel hull
- Tonnage: 4,816 GT, 1,577 NT
- Length: 325 ft (99 m)
- Beam: 60 ft (18 m)
- Draught: 22 ft (6.7 m)
- Ice class: Lloyds 100 A1 Ice Class 1*
- Installed power: Diesel-electric 5000 SHP; 6400 bhp per engine
- Propulsion: single variable-pitch propeller
- Speed: 13.25 knots (2 engines); 10.75 knots (1 engine)
- Endurance: 55 days (2 engines); 90 days (1 engine)
- Capacity: 3450 m^{3}
- Complement: 24 crew; 13 officers; 58 expeditioners

RRS Bransfield was an ice-strengthened cargo vessel, purpose-built for the British Antarctic Survey (BAS).

== History ==
RRS Bransfield was designed by consultants Graham & Woolnaugh of Liverpool for the Natural Environment Research Council to be operated by BAS British Antarctic Survey, and built by Robb Caledon Shipbuilders Ltd, Leith.

She was the second vessel named after Edward Bransfield RN (1785-1852), who discovered the north west coast of the Antarctic Peninsula, roughly surveyed the South Shetland Islands, claiming King George Island and Clarence Island for Great Britain. Bransfield was the first man to chart part of the Antarctic mainland.

An earlier wooden Norwegian sealer, built in 1918 as Veslekari, was requisitioned by the Royal Navy in 1943 and renamed HMS Bransfield. She was the original expedition ship for Operation Tabarin, a secret British expedition to Antarctica during World War Two. Her service with Tabarin was inglorious - she proved to be unseaworthy, and was replaced before the expedition left English waters in November 1943.

In 1993/94, while in the Weddell Sea, RRS Bransfield suffered an engine room fire.

In May 1999, she was sold to GC Rieber Shipping as part of the contract for the long-term charter of her replacement, RRS Ernest Shackleton. She was subsequently renamed Igenpearl, and was scrapped in Mumbai in 2000.

== Service ==
RRS Bransfield was BAS's main supply vessel for 29 years, from 1970/71 to 1998/99. She also had limited facilities for on-board research. There was a fully equipped hospital bay on board.

Bransfield represented NERC in the Review of the Fleet at Spithead in 1977, held to celebrate Queen Elizabeth II's silver jubilee.
