= List of ships christened by Elizabeth II =

Queen Elizabeth II christened many ships throughout her reign, both naval, scientific, and passenger vessels. The following is a list of all the ships she named during her lifetime, from HMS Vanguard to the cruise ship Britannia.

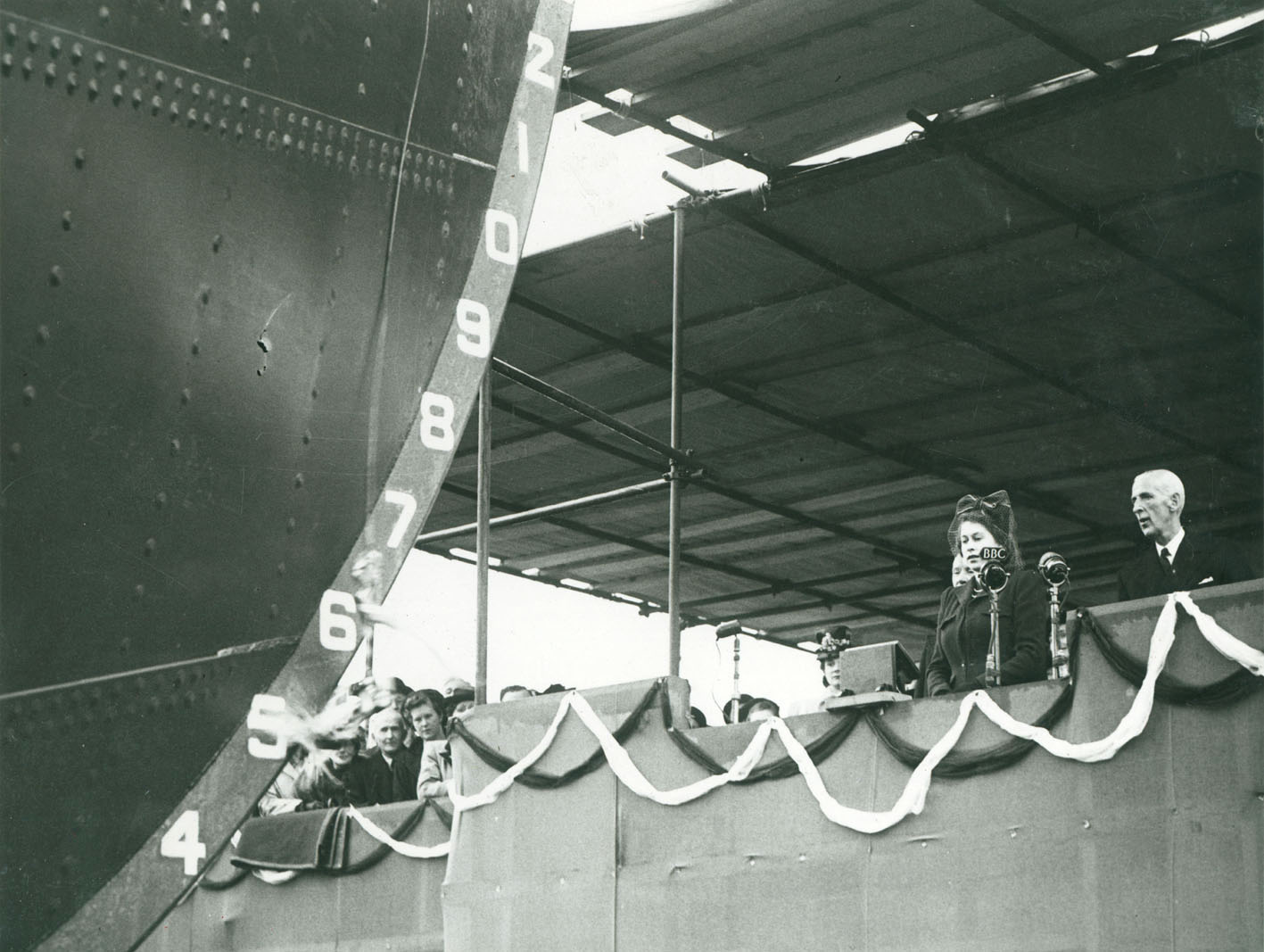
Princess Elizabeth launching the tanker British Princess built by Sir James Laing & Sons Ltd, Deptford, 30 April 1946

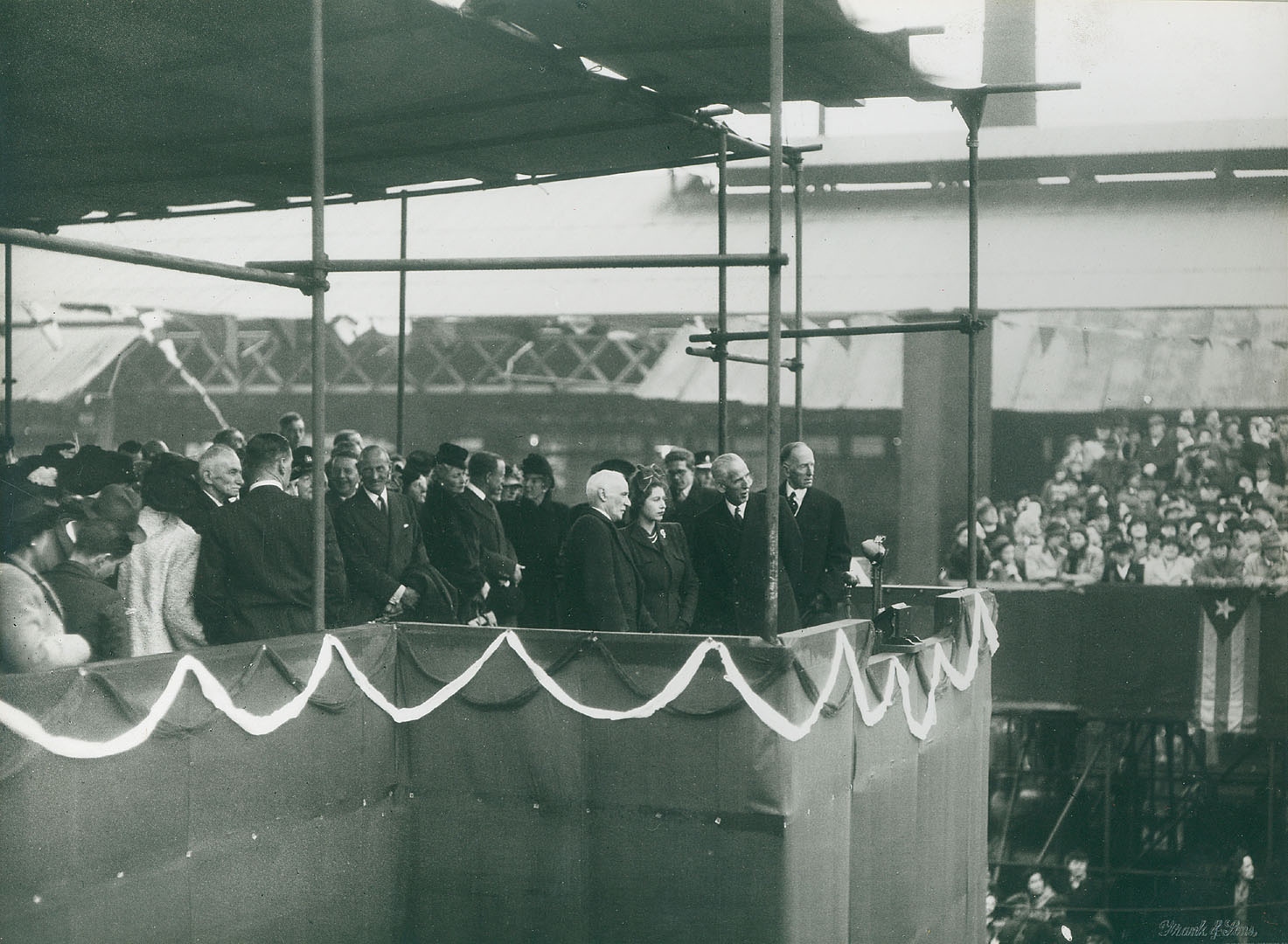
Princess Elizabeth watching the tanker British Princess sliding down the ways at the shipyard of Sir James Laing & Sons Ltd, Deptford, Sunderland, 30 April 1946

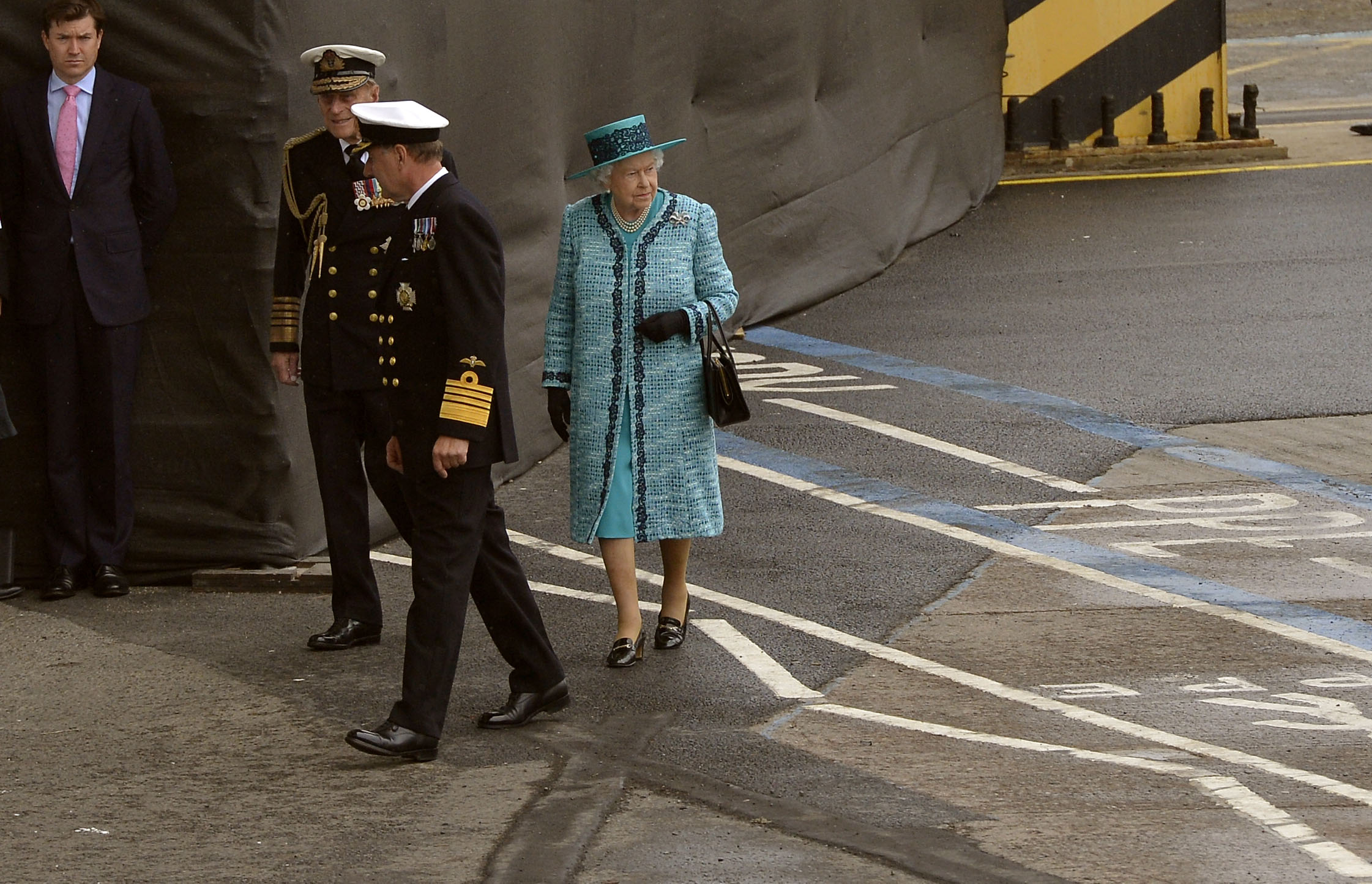
Queen Elizabeth II attending the naming ceremony for the new aircraft carrier HMS Queen Elizabeth in 2014

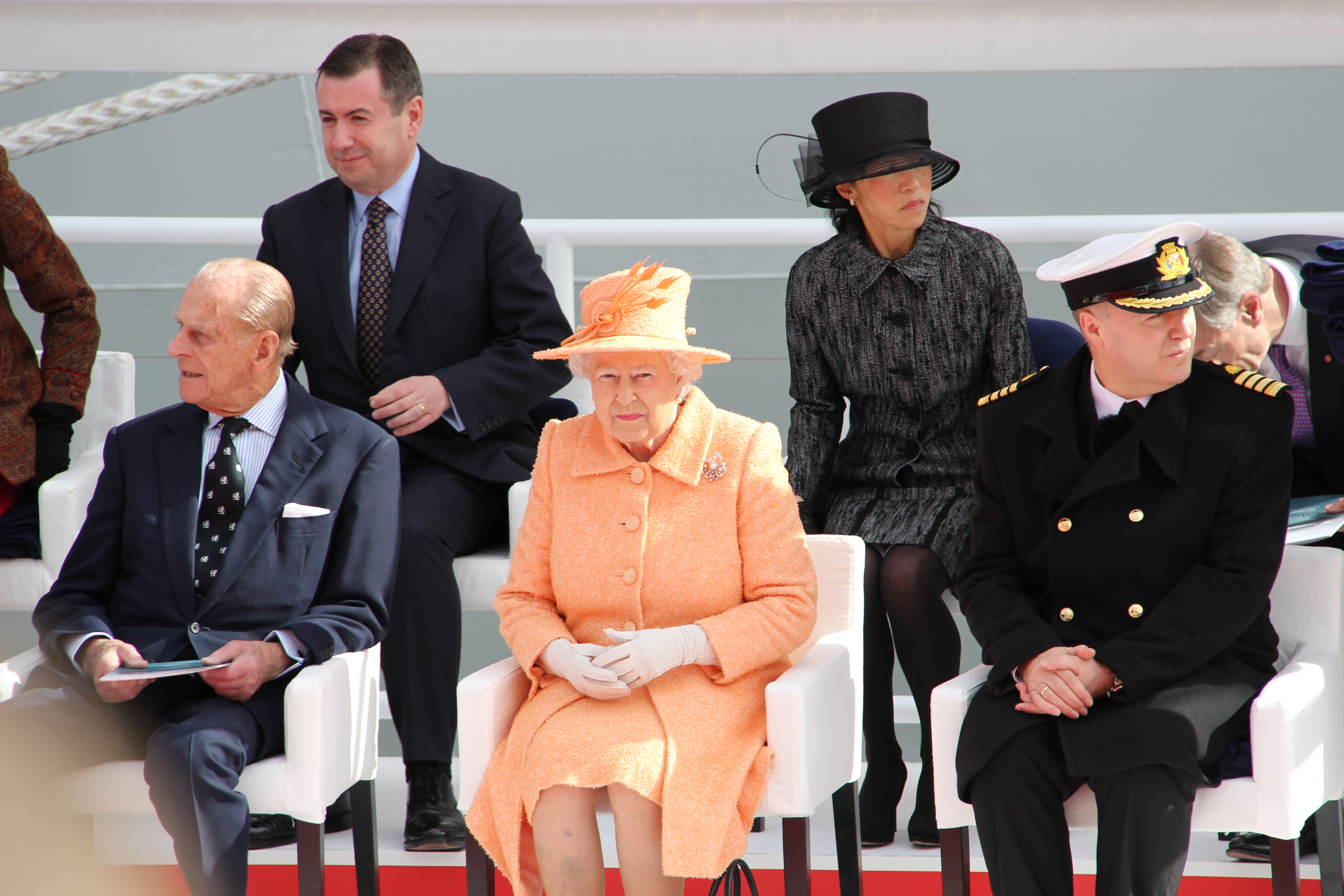
Queen Elizabeth II attending the naming ceremony for P&O Cruises Britannia in Southampton, England in 2015

== List of ships ==
As Princess
Name	Image	Affiliation	Date christened	Location christened	Status	Notes
HMS Vanguard		Royal Navy	30 November 1944	John Brown and Company, Clydebank, Scotland	Decommissioned, Scrapped, 1960	Last battleship built for Britain
British Princess		British Tanker Co. Ltd.	30 April 1946	Sir James Laing & Sons Ltd, Deptford	Scrapped in 1962	
RMS Caronia		Cunard White Star Line	30 October 1947	John Brown and Company, Clydebank, Scotland	Wrecked, Scrapped 1974	
As Queen
Name	Image	Affiliation	Date Christened	Location Christened	Status	Notes
HMY Britannia		Royal Yacht	16 April 1953	John Brown and Company, Clydebank, Scotland	Decommissioned in 1997, museum ship in Leith-Edinburgh, Scotland	
SS Southern Cross		Shaw Savill Line	17 August 1954	Harland & Wolff, Belfast	Scrapped 2003	*First merchant ship christened by Queen Elizabeth II
RMS Empress of Britain		Canadian Pacific Line	22 June 1955	Fairfield Shipbuilding in Govan, Glasgow, Scotland	Scrapped 2008	
Queen Elizabeth 2		Cunard Line	20 September 1967	John Brown and Company, Clydebank, Scotland	Hotel ship in Dubai	
HMS Invincible		Royal Navy	3 May 1977	Vickers Shipbuilding Limited, Barrow-in-Furness, England	Scrapped in 2011	
HMS Lancaster		Royal Navy	24 May 1990	Yarrow Shipbuilders, Glasgow, Scotland	In service	
RRS James Clark Ross		British Antarctic Survey	1st December 1990	Swan Hunter Shipbuilders in Wallsend, UK	In service	Sold in 2021 to National Antarctic Scientific Center of Ukraine, renamed Noosfera
Oriana		P&O Cruises	6 April 1995	Mayflower Terminal, Southampton, England	In service	
HMS Ocean		Royal Navy	11 October 1995	Vickers Shipbuilding and Engineering Ltd, Kværner (Govan)	Decommissioned 2018, sold to Brazilian Navy	
MV Hebrides		Caledonian MacBrayne	2 August 2000	Ferguson Marine, Port Glasgow	In service	
RMS Queen Mary 2		Cunard Line	8 January 2004	Queen Elizabeth II terminal, Southampton, England	In service	
MS Queen Elizabeth		Cunard Line	10 October 2010	Southampton, England	In service	
HMS Queen Elizabeth		Royal Navy	4 July 2014	Rosyth dockyard near Edinburgh, Scotland	In service	
MV Britannia		P&O Cruises	10 March 2015	Southampton, England	In service	

== Film links ==
- HMS Vanguard naming & launching (1944)
- British Princess tanker christening (1946)
- Caronia naming ceremony & launching (1947)
- Britannia christening & launching (1953)
- Southern Cross christening & launching (1954)
- Empress of Britain christening & launching (1955)
- QE2 christening & launching (1967)
- Oriana christening (1995)
- Queen Elizabeth naming ceremony (2010)
- HMS Queen Elizabeth naming ceremony (2014)
