= HMS Endurance (A171) =

Icebreaker that served as the Royal Navy ice patrol ship

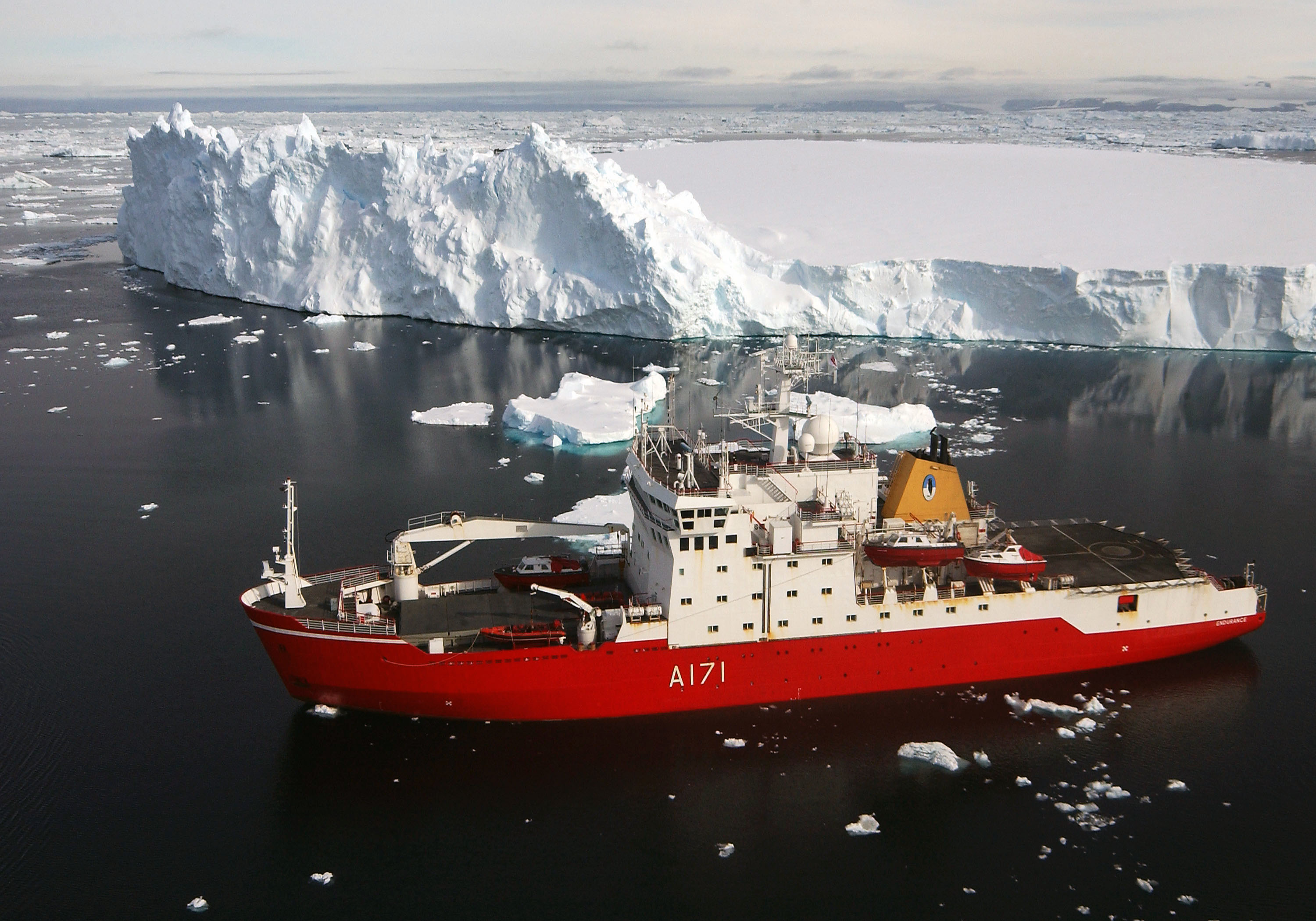
- HMS Endurance off the Antarctic Peninsula, in 2007.

History

United Kingdom
- Name: 1990: MV Polar Circle; 1991: HMS Polar Circle; 1992: HMS Endurance
- Operator: Royal Navy
- Builder: Ulstein Hatlo
- Completed: 1990
- Commissioned: 21 November 1991
- Out of service: 2008
- Home port: Portsmouth
- Identification: Pennant number: A171; IMO number: 8901561
- Motto: Fortitudine Vincimus; (Latin: "By Endurance We Conquer")
- Nickname(s): The Red Plum (from the colour of her hull).
- Fate: Scrapped 2016

General characteristics
- Type: Icebreaker
- Displacement: 6,100 t (6,004 long tons)
- Length: 91 m (298 ft 7 in)
- Beam: 17.9 m (58 ft 9 in)
- Draught: 8.5 m (27 ft 11 in)
- Ice class: 1A1
- Propulsion: 2 × Bergen BRG 8 Diesels, 8,160 hp (6,085 kW)
- Speed: 14 knots (26 km/h; 16 mph)
- Range: 24,600 nmi (45,600 km) at 12 kn (22 km/h; 14 mph)
- Boats & landing craft carried: James Caird, Nimrod, Eddie Shackleton and Dudley Docker
- Troops: Royal Marines
- Complement: 126
- Crew: Royal Navy, civilian researchers
- Sensors & processing systems: Type R84 and M34 surface search radar, Type 1006 navigation radar
- Electronic warfare & decoys: Classified
- Armament: 2 × 7.62mm Mk.44 Miniguns; 6 × 7.62mm L7 GPMGs
- Aircraft carried: 2 × Ice-modified Lynx HAS 3 helicopters
- Aviation facilities: Full aircraft facilities and double hangar

HMS Endurance was an icebreaker that served as the Royal Navy ice patrol ship between 1991 and 2008. Built in Norway as MV Polar Circle, she was chartered by the Royal Navy in 1991 as HMS Polar Circle, before being purchased outright and renamed HMS Endurance in 1992 as a replacement for the previous HMS Endurance whose hull had been weakened by striking an iceberg.

Endurance was a class 1 icebreaker. Her two Bergen BRG8 diesel engines produced over 8000 shaft horsepower enabling her to travel through ice up to 1 metre (3 ft 3 in) thick at 3 knots (5.6 km/h). Her propulsion system used a computer-controlled variable-pitch propeller and stern and bow thrusters. She carried two ice-modified Lynx helicopters, which were instrumental in the making of the BBC series Planet Earth in 2006.

The ship was laid up in Portsmouth from 2009 to 2016, following serious damage caused by flooding following an error during routine maintenance on a sea suction strainer. In October 2013 it was reported that she would be scrapped; in July 2015 the vessel was offered for sale for further use or recycling and left Portsmouth under tow to the Leyal ship recycling facility in Turkey on 1 June 2016.

== Career ==
MV Polar Circle was built in Norway in 1990 by Ulstein Hatlo for Rieber Shipping. The Royal Navy chartered her for eight months as HMS Polar Circle from 21 November 1991. She was bought outright and renamed HMS Endurance on 9 October 1992.

Endurance provided a sovereign presence in polar waters, performing hydrographic surveys and supporting the British Antarctic Survey in Antarctica. Her usual deployment saw her in the Southern Ocean and returning to the UK through tropical waters each year. Later, a longer, 18-month deployment was designed to maximise her time available for BAS usage.

In 1997, Endurance made the first visit to Argentina by a Royal Naval vessel since the Falklands War, calling at the capital, Buenos Aires, en route to her Antarctic deployment. That she was seen as a scientific and research vessel rather than a warship facilitated the visit and helped to normalise relations between Argentina and the United Kingdom. She visited the Argentinian port of Mar del Plata in 1998 and returned to Buenos Aires in 2002.

In 2005, Endurance was chosen to carry the Queen and the Duke of Edinburgh at the International Fleet Review as part of the Trafalgar 200 celebrations.

In July 2007, the United Kingdom offered Endurance to supply Argentina's Antarctic bases after their ARA Almirante Irizar icebreaker suffered extensive damage in a fire.

Although she enjoyed a varied, purposeful career as the UK's sole ice patrol vessel, Endurance's later years were problematic and ended in ignominy. After her 2004 docking period in Falmouth, the ship suffered a minor accident which resulted in her listing badly when the drydock she was situated in flooded up. The months after the refit were troublesome and the ship suffered numerous debilitating machinery failures. This was to become something of a theme over the next four years as the ship's crew struggled to keep her serviceable, set against more demanding challenges.

=== Docking in Puerto Belgrano 2006 ===
During survey work in Antarctica in January 2006, the ship's engineering staff discovered that her rudder was apparently loose on the stock. Her work period was cut short and she returned to Mare Harbour in the Falkland Islands for further inspections. Det Norske Veritas, the ship's assurance certification company, instructed that the ship should dock at the nearest available port – the nearest large enough being Puerto Belgrano, Argentina's largest naval base, where Endurance docked in mid-March 2006.

Without hotel services on board, the ship's company moved to shore-side accommodation in the city of Bahía Blanca, some twenty kilometres west of Puerto Belgrano. The rudder was removed for repairs, and once it was on the floor of the drydock, a dockers' strike followed. The ship remained there for nearly three weeks. Picket lines formed at the gates of the naval base, preventing the ship's company from relieving the stranded duty watch on board.

When the strike broke, the rudder was replaced and welded into position and the ship left Puerto Belgrano in early April 2006. She returned to Portsmouth via Lisbon and to drydock again for further engineering work on the rudder and stock.

=== 2008 near loss ===
In December 2008, while on an 18-month deployment, Endurance suffered extensive flooding to her machinery spaces and lower accommodation decks resulting in the near loss of the ship. A serious engine room flood left her without power or propulsion, and she was towed to Punta Arenas by a Chilean tug. After an extensive survey was completed, the estimates to refit the ship were put at around £30m. She was brought toPortsmouth on the semi-submersible transporter ship MV Target, arriving on 8 April 2008.

The Royal Navy inquiry found that the flood happened while a sea-water strainer was being cleaned, in an attempt to improve the production of fresh water. The air lines controlling a hull valve were incorrectly reconnected, resulting in the valve opening and an inability to close it. The pipe installation fell below generally accepted standards, which made reconnection of the air lines ambiguous.

The inquiry also found that, due to manpower constraints, the ship did not have a system maintainer and that clarity of engineering command had been lost, with no-one clearly in charge of risk-management. It was fortunate that, without propulsion, Endurance had drifted over an area shallow enough for anchors to be let go and to hold the ship in position, otherwise, "there was a very real possibility that she would have been lost either by running ashore or by succumbing to the flood." The inquiry judged that the ship's company responded well to control damage in challenging conditions.

=== Ice Patrol (TV series) ===
In 2009, National Geographic Channel ran a four-episode documentary series on Endurance. Five ran the same series the following year under the name Ice Patrol, with the final episode showing what happened the day the ship almost sank.

=== Replacement ===
On 9 September 2010, speculation in the press suggested it was likely that Endurance would be scrapped and replaced with another icebreaker from Norway.

On 22 March 2011, it was announced that the Royal Navy intended to hire MV Polarbjørn, to be renamed HMS Protector, for three years whilst a final decision on whether to repair or scrap Endurance is made. HMS Protector was purchased in September 2013.

It was announced on 7 October 2013 that Endurance would be sold for scrap, as it was not 'economically viable' to repair the damage sustained in 2008. In July 2015 the Ministry of Defence gave advanced notice of sale of the vessel for further use or recycling, noting that "parties interested in acquiring the vessel for future use should note it will require considerable investment". The vessel left Portsmouth under tow to the breakers' yard in Turkey on 1 June 2016.

== Link to Sir Ernest Shackleton ==
Endurance was named after the ship which Sir Ernest Shackleton used in his Antarctic expedition of 1914–1917. The names of Endurance's boats and landing craft continued the Shackleton connection: James Caird and Dudley Docker were named after boats carried by Shackleton's Endurance, Nimrod was named after the ship which Shackleton used on his Antarctic expedition of 1907–1909, and Eddie Shackleton was named after the explorer's son. The motto of Endurance, "fortitudine vincimus" ("by endurance, we conquer"), was also the Shackleton family motto.
