= M. Cristina Pedicchio =

Italian mathematician and academic administrator

Maria Cristina Pedicchio (born 1953) is an Italian mathematician and academic administrator, the president of the Agency for the Promotion of European Research.

== Education and career ==
Pedicchio was born in Trieste on 9 August 1953. She earned a laurea (then the equivalent of a master's degree) in mathematics from the University of Trieste in 1976. From 1976 to 2003 she held faculty positions in various ranks in the faculties of sciences and architecture at the University of Trieste, where she became professor of algebra in the faculty of sciences in 2003. Pedicchio's mathematical research was focused on category theory.

After shifting to academic administration, she became president of the National Institute of Oceanography and Applied Geophysics (OGS), and headed the Consorzio per il Centro di Biomedicina Molecolare in Trieste, and headed AREA Science Park near Trieste. She was named president of the Maritime Technology Cluster of the Friuli Venezia Giulia region (MareFVG) in 2021, and the Agency for the Promotion of European Research (APRE) in 2024.

== Recognition ==
Pedicchio was named as a commander in the Order of Merit of the Italian Republic in 2010.
