= HMS Protector (A173) =

Research ship & Icebreaker of the Royal Navy

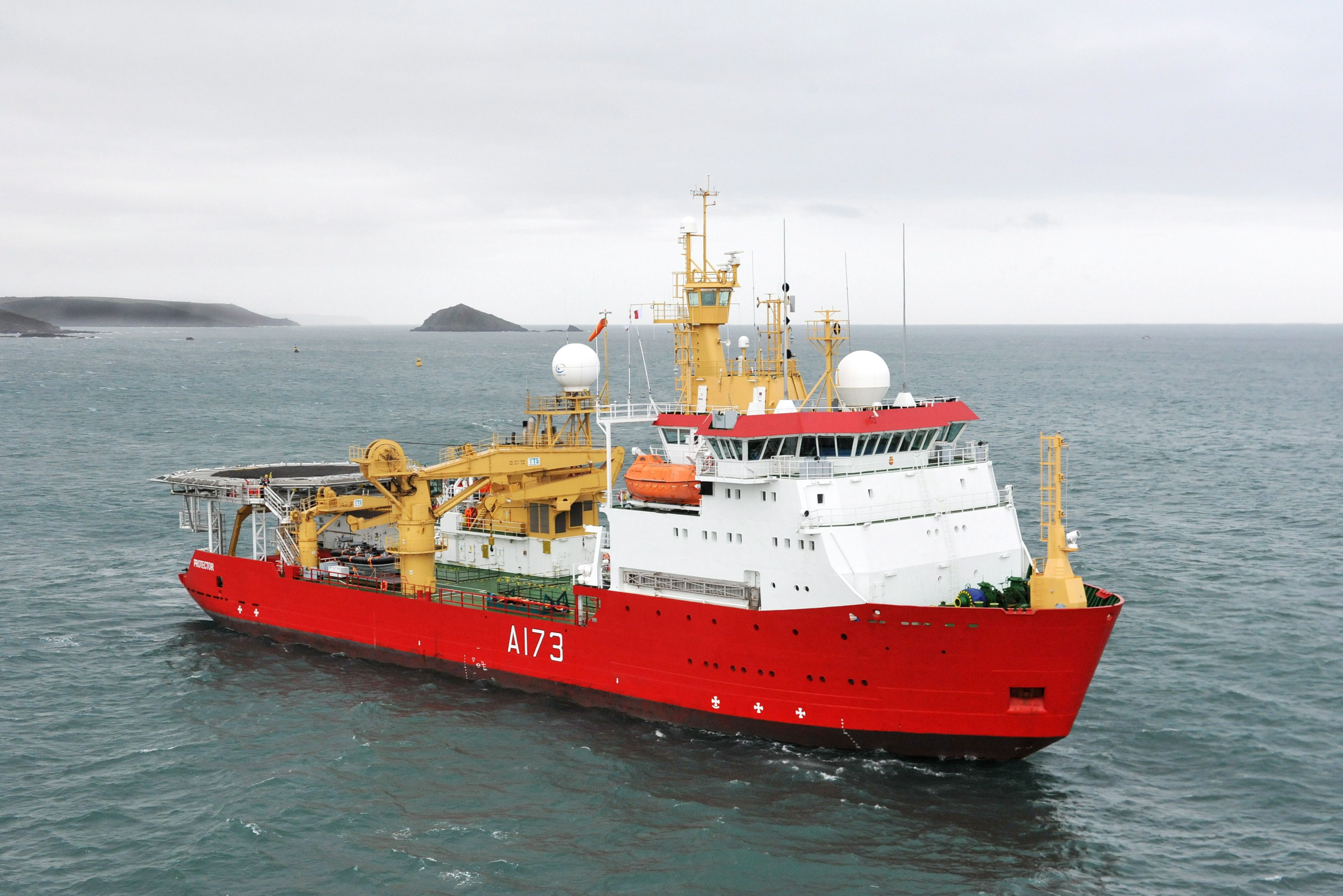
- HMS Protector in 2011

History

Norway
- Name: Polarbjørn
- Namesake: Polar bear
- Owner: GC Rieber Shipping, Bergen, Norway
- Builder: Western Shiprepair Yard, Klaipėda, Lithuania (hull); Havyard Leirvik, Leirvik, Norway (outfitting)
- Yard number: 076
- Laid down: 30 September 2000
- Launched: 21 July 2001
- Completed: 22 October 2001
- Home port: Bergen
- Identification: IMO number: 9233997; MMSI number: 257870000; Call sign: LARY5

United Kingdom
- Name: HMS Protector
- Owner: GC Rieber Shipping, Bergen; September 2013: Royal Navy
- Operator: Royal Navy
- In service: 2011
- Home port: HMNB Devonport
- Identification: Pennant number: A173; International call sign: GXRK; IMO number: 9233997; MMSI Number: 235086758
- Status: In commission, but inactive as of 2026 due to technical problems
- Badge

General characteristics
- Type: Research ship & Icebreaker
- Displacement: 5,000 t (4,900 long tons; 5,500 short tons)
- Length: LOA 89 m (292 ft 0 in); LBP 80.4 m (263 ft 9 in)
- Beam: 18 m (59 ft 1 in)
- Draft: 8.35 m (27 ft 5 in) (max); 7.3 m (23 ft 11 in) (as icebreaker)
- Ice class: DNV ICE-05
- Installed power: 2 × Rolls-Royce Bergen BR-8, 2 x 3,535 kW (4,741 hp)
- Propulsion: Rolls-Royce controllable-pitch propeller; Brunvoll bow thrusters (800+600 kW), stern thrusters (1125+990 kW) and retractable azimuth thruster (1500 kW)
- Speed: 15 knots (28 km/h; 17 mph)
- Boats & landing craft carried: 1 × Sea-class workboat; 1 x additional survey/workboat; 1 x Fast Rescue Craft (FRC); 2 × Pacific 22 RIBs
- Complement: 88 (accommodation for up to 100)
- Armament: 4 Miniguns (retired 2023; may be replaced by Browning .50 caliber heavy machine guns); 5 General purpose machine guns
- Aviation facilities: Helicopter deck (no hangar); Sky Mantis UAVs embarked

HMS Protector is a Royal Navy ice patrol ship built in Norway in 2000. As MV Polarbjørn (Norwegian: polar bear) she operated under charter as a polar research icebreaker and a subsea support vessel. In 2011, she was chartered as a temporary replacement for the ice patrol ship HMS Endurance and was purchased by the British Ministry of Defence in early September 2013. As a DNV Ice Class 05 vessel she can handle first year ice up to 0.5 metres (20 in) thick.

== Service history (Norway) ==
Polarbjørn was designed and built for long Antarctic expeditions and for supporting subsea work. Polarbjørn was equipped to DP2 class and had accommodation for 100 people. Large cargo holds and open deck areas provide storage capacity for ROVs and related equipment. A 50-ton knuckle-boom crane and the 25-ton stern A-frame allow equipment to be deployed over the side and over the stern.

Polarbjørn worked in the "spot" market, on short-term charter. During 2009, the vessel was chartered for electromagnetic survey work in the North Sea, Norwegian Sea and Barents Sea. She was exposed to a downturn in business during 2010, with only a 33% utilization.

Prior to the Royal Navy charter, she underwent a ten-day refit in Odense Steel Shipyard, Denmark. The helicopter deck, originally above her bridge, was repositioned over the stern and a multibeam echosounder for survey work was installed. Her engines and gearboxes were overhauled and she was modified to allow the carriage of the ancillary vessels and vehicles (survey boats, all-terrain vehicles) used in support of the British Antarctic Survey.

== Service history (Royal Navy) ==
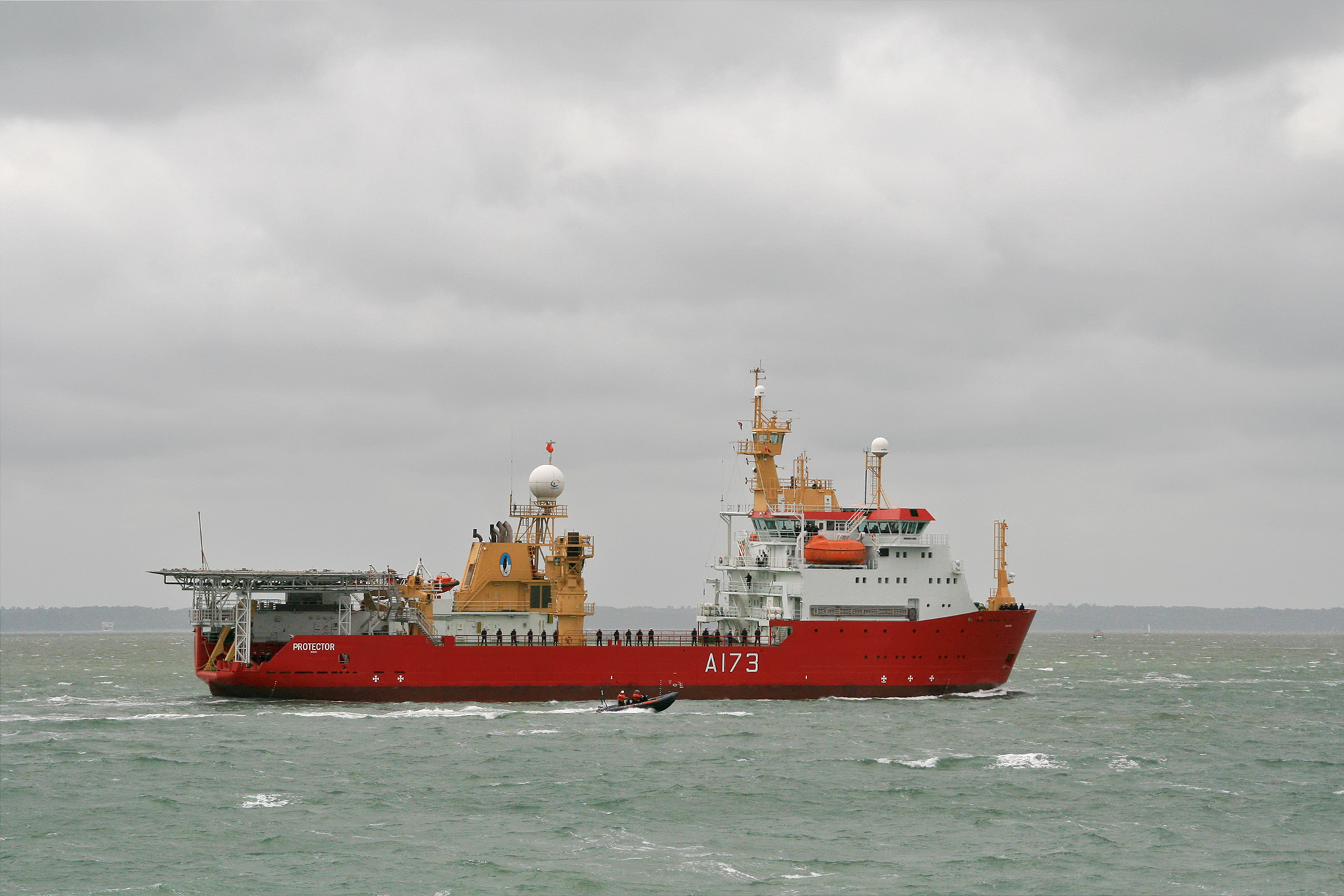
Protector inbound to HMNB Portsmouth on 23 May 2011 with naval crew lining the deck

From April 2011, she was chartered to the Royal Navy for three years as a temporary replacement for the ice patrol ship, HMS Endurance, and was renamed HMS Protector. The annual cost of the charter was £8.7m. In September 2013 the British Ministry of Defence purchased the ship outright from GC Rieber Shipping, for £51 million. In October 2013 the Ministry of Defence announced that from 1 April 2014 the ship's homeport would change from HMNB Portsmouth to HMNB Devonport, the location of the Hydrography and Meteorology Centre of Specialisation and where the Royal Navy's other survey ships are based.

She was commissioned into the Navy on 23 June 2011 as HMS Protector. The commissioning ceremony was held on the 50th anniversary of the date that the Antarctic Treaty came into force. During September 2011, Protector embarked on operational sea training in preparation for her first deployment in November.

In February 2012, after receiving a distress call from Comandante Ferraz Antarctic Station on King George Island in the South Shetland Islands, Protector sailed to provide assistance to the Brazilian research station after a large fire had broken out. 23 of her sailors were put ashore with fire-fighting equipment to tackle the blaze. Two of the researchers died in the incident.

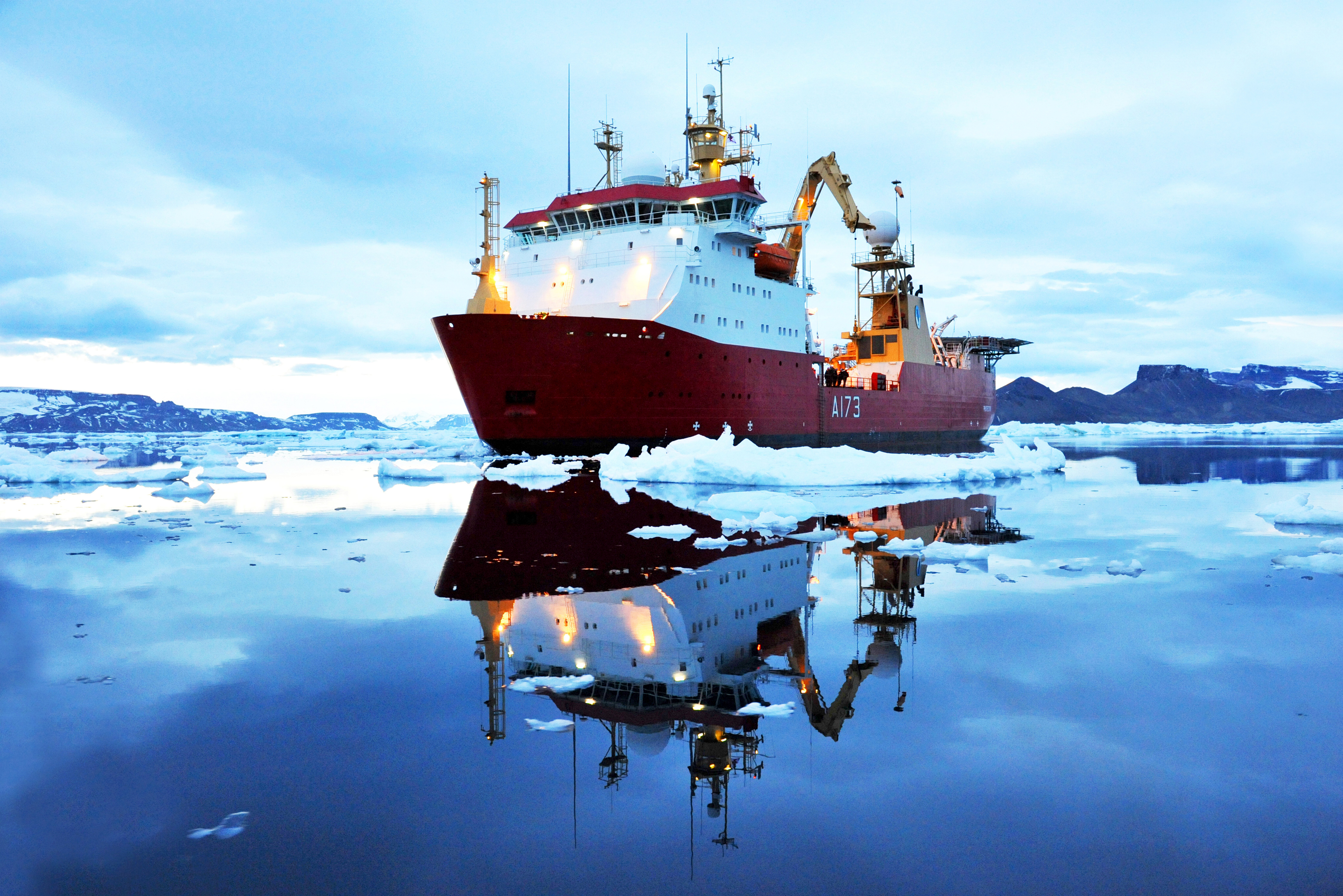
On her first Antarctic deployment, March 2012

During March and April 2012, the ship operated in the vicinity of Rothera Research Station. During a major visit, she delivered around 170 cubic metres of aviation fuel. At 67° 34′ S, this was the most southerly visit of her career up to that date, nearly 800 miles (1,300 km) from Cape Horn, the southernmost tip of the South America. The crew competed in a 'winter Olympics' with scientists from the British Antarctic Survey.

On the way to her second Antarctic deployment, in October 2012 Protector surveyed the wreck of the Dale-class oiler RFA Darkdale in James Bay, Saint Helena, as part of an assessment of its possible threat to the island's environment. On arriving in Antarctica in December, her designated Antarctic Treaty Observers supported an international team carrying out inspections of research stations to ensure compliance with the Antarctic Treaty.

The ship left for her third Antarctic deployment in October 2013. She revisited Rothera and then sailed across Marguerite Bay, reaching a latitude of 68° 12′ S, 850 miles (1,370 km) from Cape Horn.

In the northern summer of 2014, the ship visited the Caribbean to perform training for humanitarian assistance, and also assisted some community projects in the British Virgin Islands.

In late 2015, Protector commenced a 20-month deployment to the Ross Sea for fisheries patrol and hydrographic survey operations. It is the first time that a Royal Navy or British Government vessel has operated in the waters south of Australia and New Zealand since 1936. In addition to the ship's usual equipment, three unmanned aerial vehicles (designed and 3D printed by the University of Southampton) were embarked. Sailing from Devonport, Protector visited the Seychelles and Diego Garcia en route (in the latter instance, becoming the first Royal Navy surface ship to visit in eight years) before proceeding to Tasmania, Australia. At the start of December, Protector departed from Hobart, Tasmania to commence fisheries patrols. In January 2016, the ship completed a five-week patrol of the Ross Sea conducting inspections in support of the Convention for the Conservation of Antarctic Marine Living Resources, with the aid of six embarked Australian and New Zealand specialists. The ship visited Zucchelli Station and reached a latitude of 77° 56′ S. Crew members visited Scott's Hut at Cape Evans. Protector circled the globe, covering more than 18,500 nautical miles, in 2016.

In November 2017, following a request for assistance from the Argentine government, Protector was redeployed to aid international efforts to locate the missing submarine ARA San Juan.

In 2020 crew from the ship were trained aboard Canadian Coast Guard vessels in Arctic waters and renewed cooperation again in 2021.

In 2021, Protector made her first patrol of the Arctic, reaching 1,050 kilometres (570 nautical miles) from the North Pole, the furthest north any Royal Navy surface ship has reached. The ship was again on deployment in the South Atlantic during the 2023-24 regional summer, when internet access was provided for sailors using a commercial satellite internet constellation for the first time for a Royal Navy ship.

As of 2026, the ship was reported to be experiencing serious technical problems and she was unable to deploy to Antarctic waters for the 2025-26 regional summer. In October 2026, the ship had to be towed into Devonport with an uncertain future. While the 2026 Defence Investment Plan indicated that she would be replaced, the timing of that was unclear.

== Embarked equipment ==
Protector has operated several small boats, including the survey motor boat James Caird IV, the ramped work boat Terra Nova and two Pacific 22 RIBs Nimrod and Aurora. She also embarks three BV206 all-terrain vehicles, a number of quad-bikes and trailers for activities on Antarctica, such as moving stores and equipment as well as Sky Mantis UAVs used for search and rescue missions, aerial photography and surveying/plotting routes through sea ice.

The formerly embarked James Caird IV was a 10.5-metre (34 ft), ice-capable survey motor boat built by Mustang Marine in Pembroke Dockyard, based on a design of existing British Antarctic Survey boats. It has a crew of five, plus up to five passengers. The boat was named by Alexandra Shackleton, the granddaughter of Antarctic explorer Ernest Shackleton, during the commissioning ceremony for Protector on 23 June 2011. The boat's name commemorated the voyage of the James Caird made by Shackleton in 1916.

Subsequently, it was reported that Protector would carry at least one of the new 11-metre survey module variants of the Sea-class work boats being procured for various tasks in the Royal Navy. The survey module replaced James Caird IV.

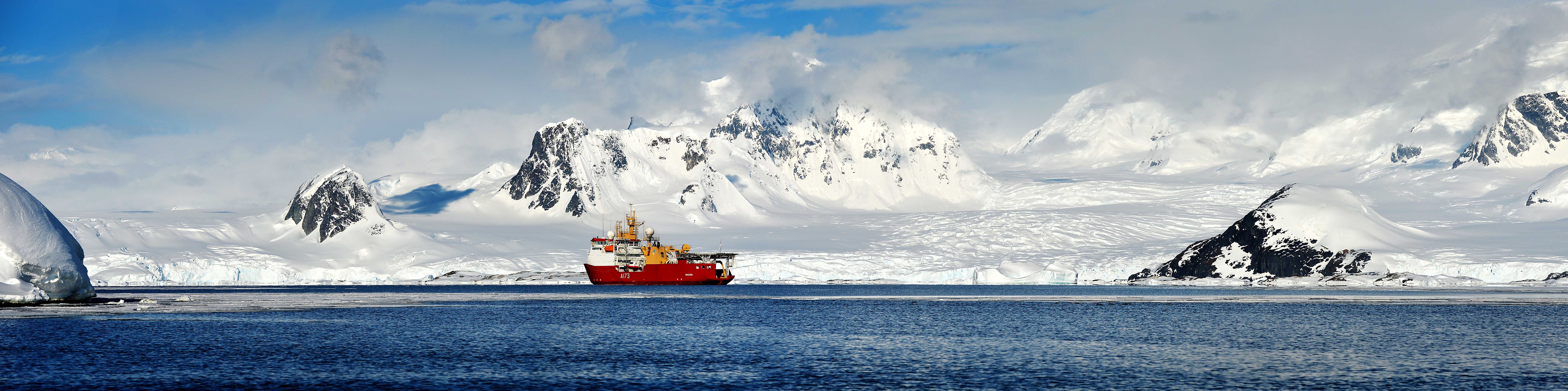
HMS Protector in Antarctica, December 2013

== See also ==
- Royal Research Ship
- Standing Royal Navy deployments
