= Laura Bassi (icebreaker) =

Icebreaker launched in 1995

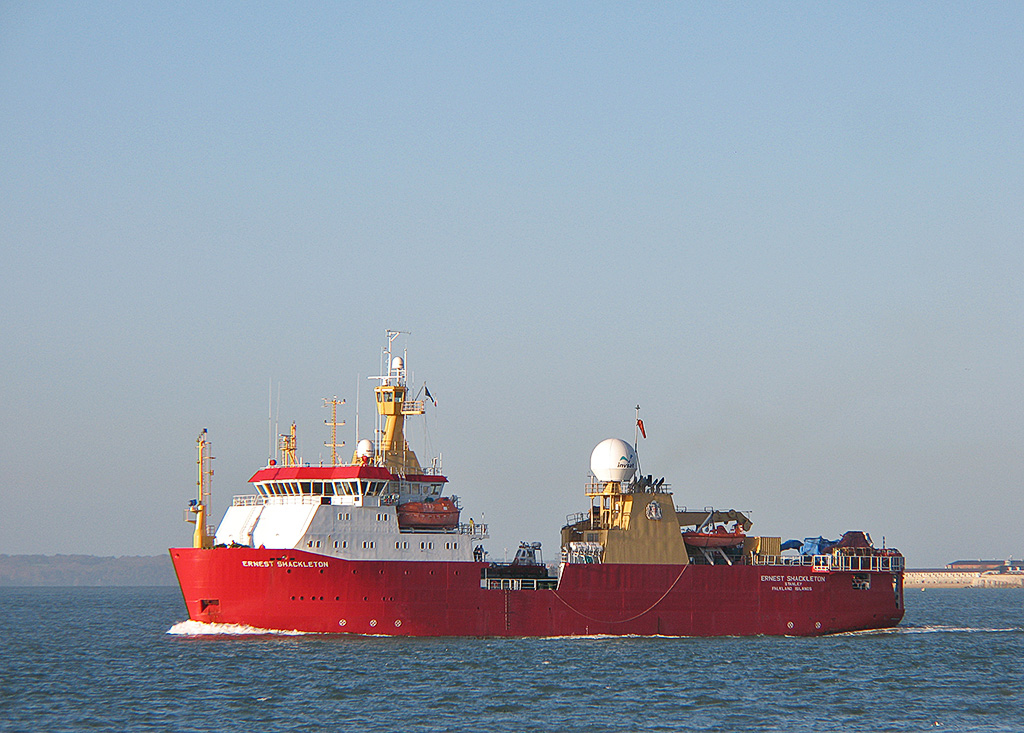
- The Ernest Shackleton (1999–2019), now N/R Laura Bassi (2019-)

History

Norway
- Name: Polar Queen
- Owner: GC Rieber Shipping
- Port of registry: Bergen
- Builder: Kværner Kleven Leirvik A/S, Leirvik, Sogn og Fjordane, Norway
- Cost: $27,352,000
- Yard number: 267
- Laid down: 26 November 1994
- Launched: July 1995
- Completed: 27 September 1995
- In service: 1995–1999
- Fate: Transferred to British Antarctic Survey

United Kingdom
- Name: Ernest Shackleton
- Namesake: Sir Ernest Shackleton
- Owner: GC Rieber Shipping
- Operator: British Antarctic Survey
- Port of registry: Stanley, Falkland Islands
- In service: 1999–2019
- Fate: Sold to Italy

Italy
- Name: Laura Bassi
- Namesake: Laura Bassi
- Owner: Istituto Nazionale di Oceanografia e di Geofisica Sperimentale (OGS)
- Acquired: 2019
- Identification: IMO number: 9114256
- Status: In service

General characteristics
- Class & type: Royal Research Ship; (Research/Survey/Cargo)
- Displacement: 5455 tonnes loaded
- Length: 80 m (262 ft)
- Beam: 17.0 m (56 ft)
- Draught: 6.15 m (20 ft)
- Ice class: DNV ICE-05 Icebreaker
- Installed power: 2 x Bergen Diesel BRM 6 each 2550 kW
- Propulsion: Thrusters : 816 Hp x 3 + 1088 Hp x 1 + 1 Azimuth 1088 Hp
- Speed: 11 knots (20 km/h; 13 mph); 14 knots (26 km/h; 16 mph) (maximum)
- Range: 40,000 nautical miles (74,000 km; 46,000 mi)
- Endurance: 130 days
- Complement: 72 (22 Officers/Crew, 50 expedition personnel)
- Aviation facilities: Helicopter deck, max helicopter weight 10 tonnes

Laura Bassi (formerly Polar Queen and RRS Ernest Shackleton) is an icebreaking research vessel operated by the Italian National Institute of Oceanography and Applied Geophysics. Between 1999 and 2019, she was the British Antarctic Survey (BAS) logistics ship, primarily used for the resupply of scientific stations in the Antarctic. Laura Bassi is ice strengthened with a double hull construction, certified Category A PC5 according to the Polar Code. She is capable of a wide range of logistic tasks, as well as having a scientific capability.

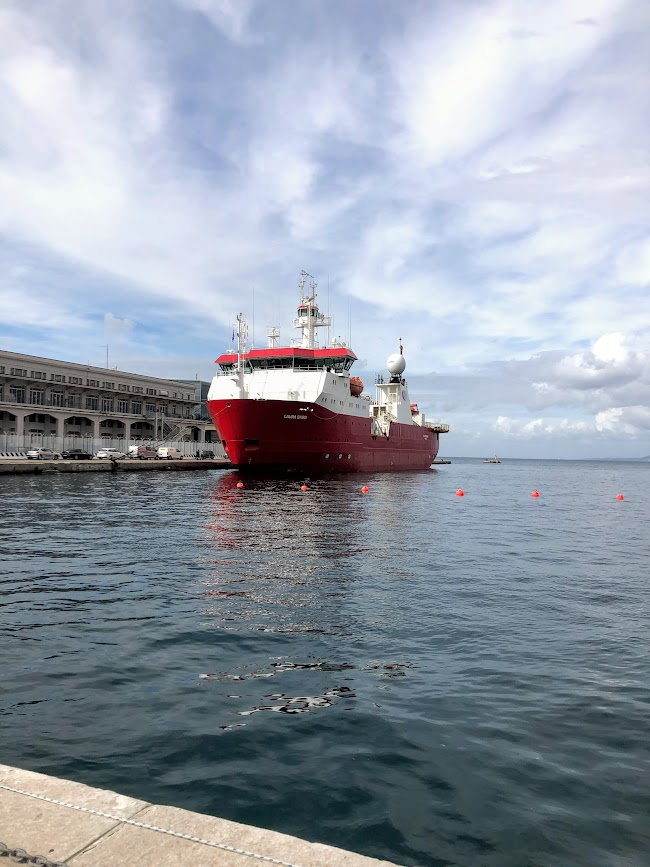
The N/R Laura Bassi moored in the port of Trieste

== History ==
Launched in July 1995 as MV Polar Queen for GC Rieber Shipping, she was operated in the Antarctic by other national programmes. The BAS acquired her on a long-term bareboat charter in August 1999 to replace RRS Bransfield. She was renamed RRS Ernest Shackleton in 2000, after the Anglo-Irish polar explorer Sir Ernest Shackleton, but was known to users as "The Shack".

=== RRS Ernest Shackleton ===
Between 1999 and 2019, RRS Ernest Shackleton was the main logistic ship for the BAS. She was used to resupply the survey's Antarctic research stations and also had a research capability. "Tula", a cargo tender stored on deck, allowed transfer ashore of stores and equipment when the ship could not berth alongside.

During the northern summer, she was commercially chartered, often working in the North Sea. On charter to Crystal Cruise Line, she escorted its 68,000 ton liner Crystal Serenity through Canada's Northwest Passage in late August/September 2016 and 2017.

After 20 years of polar duties for BAS, Ernest Shackleton was returned to her owners on 30 April 2019.

=== RV Laura Bassi ===
The National Institute of Oceanography and Applied Geophysics acquired the ship on 9 May 2019. They renamed her RV Laura Bassi, in honour of the first woman to earn a professorship in physics at a university and the first woman in the world to be appointed a university chair in a scientific field of studies.

In the austral summer 2019/2020, she carried out the first Antarctic mission under the Italian flag, completing two rotations between New Zealand and Zucchelli Station, the Italian Antarctic base.

In November 2020, she was certified Category A PC5 according to the Polar Code rules.

In September 2021, the vessel carried out its first Italian scientific campaign in the Arctic and in November 2021, it left for New Zealand as part of the 37th Italian scientific expedition to Antarctica.

In November 2022, during its voyage to New Zealand for the 38th Italian scientific expedition to Antarctica, while still in the Mediterranean Sea, the vessel rescued 92 people drifting at sea for six days.

In February 2023, she set a record by sailing further south than any ship before, achieving 78°44•280´S in the Bay of Whales, which was made possible by an unusual lack of ice. For this achievement, the vessel and its team were awarded the 29th Premio Barcola.

In June 2023, the vessel spent 18 days in the Mediterranean Sea on a research campaign contributing to three different geologic and oceanographic scientific initiatives.

During the 39th Italian scientific expedition to Antarctica, which ended in March 2024, researchers aboard the vessel discovered a previously unknown chain of underwater volcanoes in the seas of Northern Victoria Land in Antarctica.

In December 2024, the vessel suffered a port engine failure which required repairs in the harbour of Lyttelton, New Zealand.

Between December 2024 and March 2025, the vessel spent two months travelling in Antarctic waters to study physical and biogeochemical dynamics around the continent. This was the 40th scientific expedition to Antarctica as part of the Italian National Programme for Research in Antarctica.

In March 2025, the vessel transported the oldest ice samples ever extracted from Antarctica, result of the Beyond EPICA project, to Europe.

== See also ==
- Noosfera, formerly RRS James Clark Ross, another former British Antarctic Survey Royal Research Ship now operated by the National Antarctic Scientific Center of Ukraine
- RRS Sir David Attenborough, a new Royal Research Ship which entered service in 2021
