= MV Polar Princess =

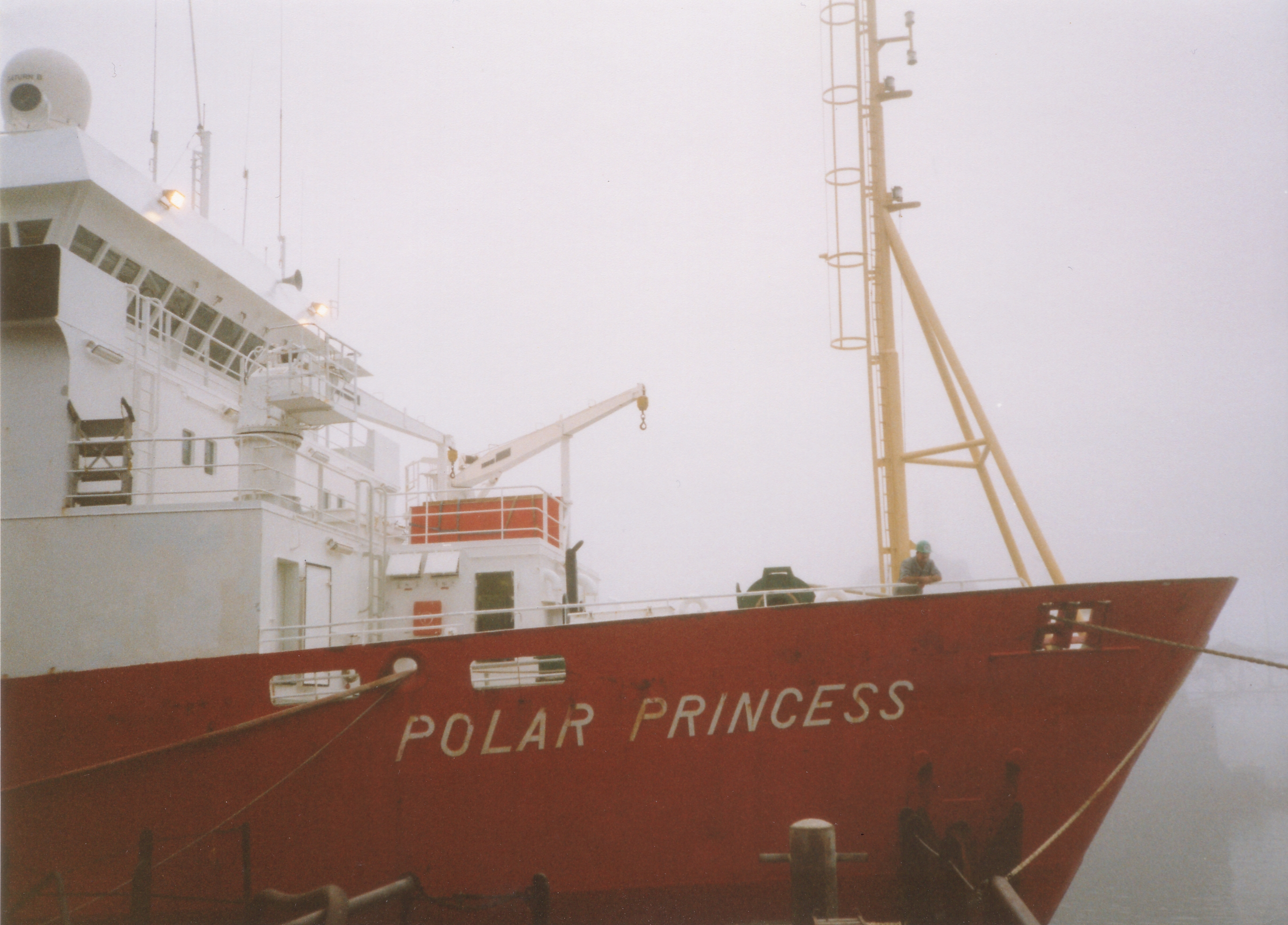
- Polar Princess as photographed in 1999.

History

Norway
- Name: MV Polar Princess
- Owner: Rieber Shipping AS.
- Operator: Rieber Shipping AS.
- Port of registry: Bergen, Norway
- Builder: Kleven Løland, Leirvik, Norway
- Launched: 1985
- Out of service: 2020
- Identification: IMO number: 8501074; Callsign JXBV3
- Status: In service

General characteristics
- Type: Seismic Survey Vessel
- Tonnage: 2,508 GT
- Length: 76.2 m (250 ft)
- Beam: 14 m (46 ft)
- Draft: 7.1 m (23 ft)
- Crew: 60

MV Polar Princess was a Norwegian seismic survey vessel owned by Rieber Shipping AS, and is operated by them on behalf of CGGVeritas. The ship was in early 2020. The ship was formerly operated by Geophysical Service Incorporated along with the now decommissioned MV Polar Prince survey ship.

Crew change by helicopter, Gulf of Mexico, 1999
