= Glover Rocks =

Group of rocks on Avian Island, Antarctica

The Glover Rocks (67°46′S 68°54′W) are a group of rocks lying northwest of Avian Island, off the south end of Adelaide Island, Antarctica. They were named by the UK Antarctic Place-Names Committee for John F. Glover, 3rd Engineer of RRS John Biscoe (1962–63), the ship assisting the Royal Navy Hydrographic Survey Unit which charted the feature in 1963.
