= De-Kastri terminal =

Port in De-Kastri, Khabarovsk Krai, Russia

De-Kastri Terminal
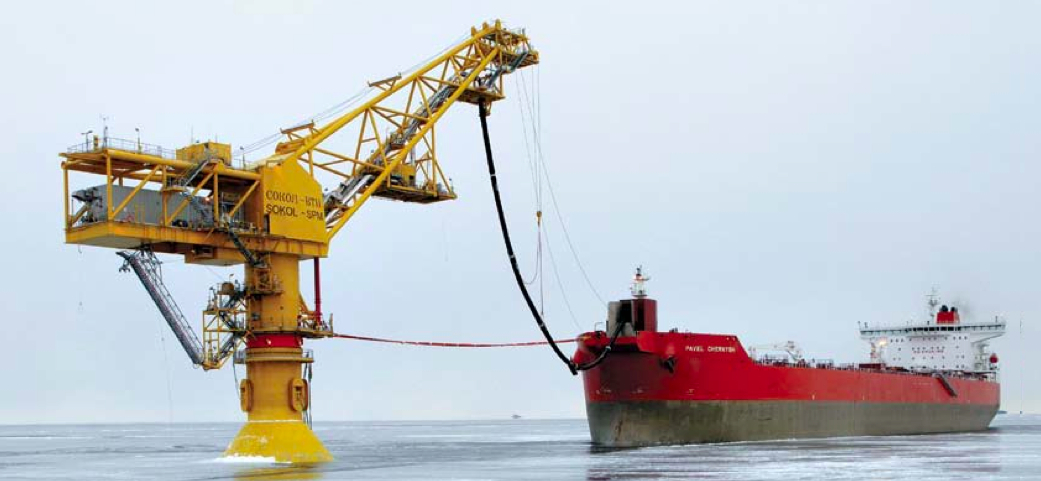
- Interactive map of De-Kastri Terminal

Location
- Country: Russia
- Location: Khabarovsk Krai
- Coordinates: 51°28′N 140°46′E
- UN/LOCODE: RUDKA

Details
- Opened: 2006
- Operated by: Exxon Neftegas
- Owned by: Russian Federation
- Type of harbour: Oil and Gas Terminal
- Size: 256,000 m^{2} (2,760,000 sq ft)

Statistics
- Annual cargo tonnage: 88 Mbbl (~1.2×10^{7} t)

De-Kastri Oil Terminal (Russian: Нефтеотгрузочный терминал Де-Кастри) is an oil export terminal located 6 km (3.7 mi) away from the village of De-Kastri in Khabarovsk Krai, Russian Federation. It is one of the biggest oil terminals in the Far East that serves as a hub for crude oil deliveries to Asian markets. The terminal which started operations in 2006 belongs to the Sakhalin-I consortium led by Exxon Neftegas which also includes 20% stake held by Russian affiliates of Rosneft: Sakhalinmorneftegas-Shelf and RN-Astra. The overall capacity of the export terminal is approximately 88 million barrels per annum (~1.2×10^{7} t/a) of oil. Tanker loading capacity is suitable for Aframax tankers up to 110,000 DWT. The five Aframax tankers servicing the terminal are purpose-designed double-hull ice class vessels. The area of the terminal covers nearly 256,000 square metres (2,760,000 sq ft)

The construction of the terminal started in 2003 and was completed by August 2006. Construction subcontractors included Russian-Turkish joint venture, Enka-Technstroiexport and Russian companies Koksokhimmontazh and Dalmorstroi.

== Awards ==
In November 2009, during the IV International congress Oil Terminal 2009 held in Saint Petersburg, De-Kastri terminal won the Terminal of the Year award. The award Terminal of the Year with capacity of shipment of more than 5 million tonnes per year is presented to an international terminal with best economic, ecological and social indicators once in every three years. De-Kastri terminal was nominated among the total of 34 candidates. Since 2006, nearly 300 oil tankers have transported more than 30 million tonnes of crude oil from the terminal without a single incident. De-Kastri's SBM loading is considered to be the largest in the industry.

== See also ==
- Exxon Neftegas
- Sakhalin-I
- Sakhalin
