= Royal Research Ship =

Scientific research vessel of the United Kingdom

A Royal Research Ship (RRS) is a merchant navy vessel of the United Kingdom that conducts scientific research on behalf of His Majesty's Government. Before a ship can be designated as an RRS, a warrant from the monarch is required.

Organisations operating Royal Research Ships include the Natural Environment Research Council (NERC), the British Antarctic Survey (BAS) and the National Oceanography Centre (NOC). In the 1950s and 1960s, the ships were owned by the Admiralty and partially managed by the Royal Fleet Auxiliary. The current fleet comprises three active vessels operated under NERC, while a number of notable ships have been retired from service.

== Relationship with the Royal Navy ==
In the 1950s and 1960s the Royal Research Ships of the day were owned by the Admiralty, partially managed by the Royal Fleet Auxiliary (RFA), and run as ships of that fleet.

The work of the Royal Research Ship operated by the British Antarctic Survey is complemented by a Royal Navy icebreaker, currently HMS Protector, which provides science logistics support to the British Antarctic Survey.

== Current Royal Research Ships ==
All ships bear the prefix "RRS" - Royal Research Ship.

Ship	Entered service	Displacement	Type	Owner	Operator
RRS Sir David Attenborough	2021	15,000 tonnes	Research ship	Natural Environment Research Council	British Antarctic Survey
RRS James Cook	2007	5,800 tonnes	Research ship	Natural Environment Research Council	National Marine Facilities Division; National Oceanography Centre
RRS Discovery	2013	6,260 tonnes	Research ship	Natural Environment Research Council	National Marine Facilities Division; National Oceanography Centre

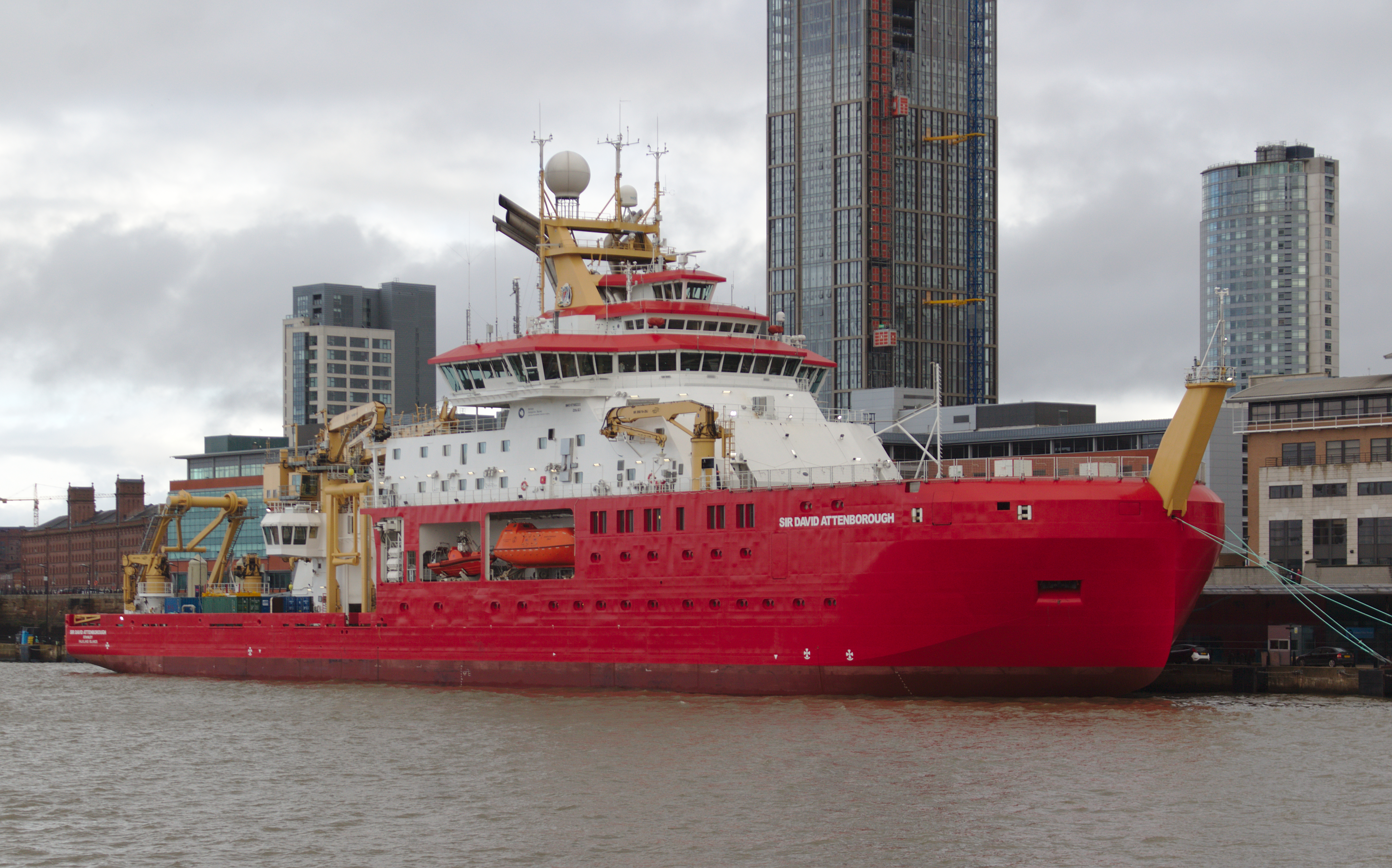
Sir David Attenborough

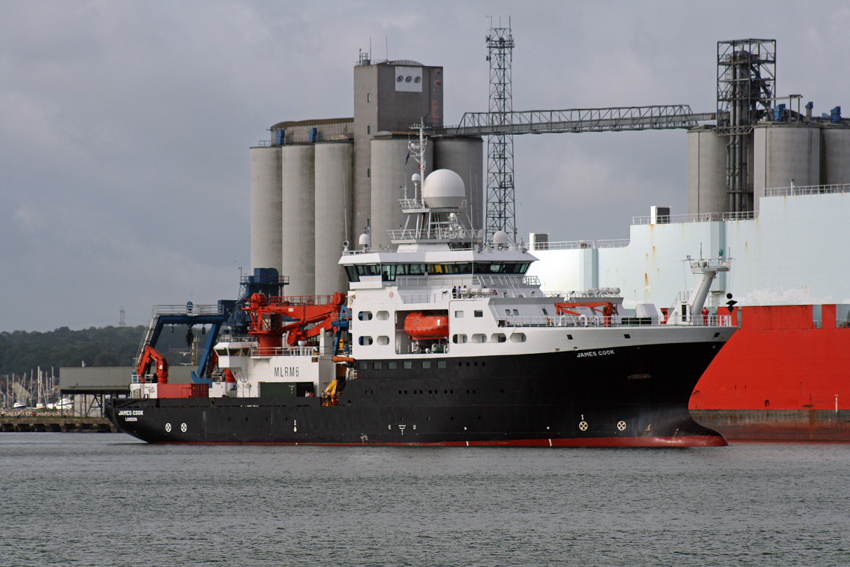
James Cook

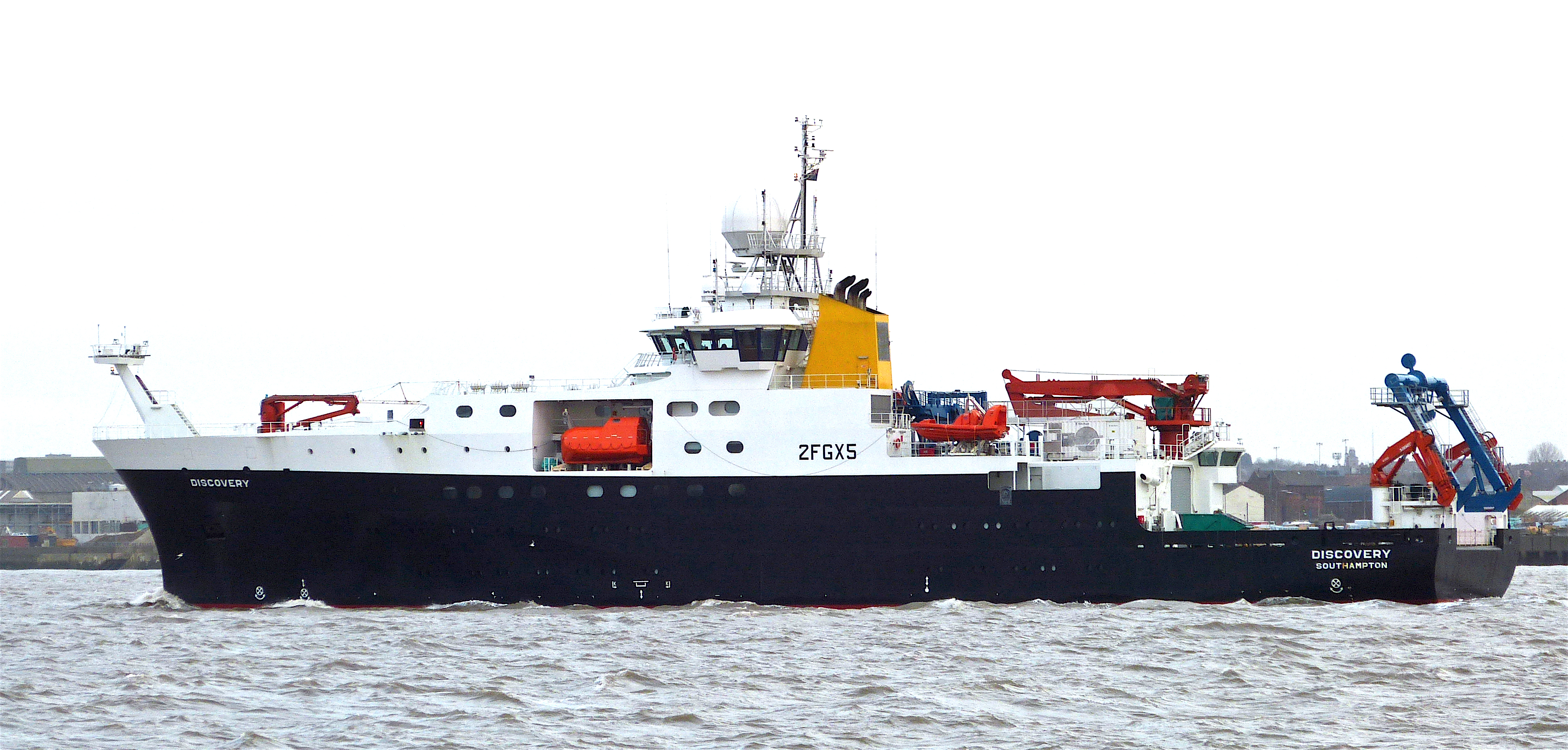
Discovery

== Notable former Royal Research Ships ==
- RRS Discovery (1901)
- RRS William Scoresby (1926)
- RRS Discovery II (1929)
- RRS Shackleton (1955)
- RRS John Biscoe (1956)
- RRS Discovery (1962)
- RRS Bransfield (1970)
- RRS Charles Darwin (1985)
- RRS Ernest Shackleton (1999)
- RRS James Clark Ross (1990)

== See also ==
- Marine Directorate
- History of research ships
- Research vessel
