= De-Kastri =

De-Kastri Де-Кастри
- Settlement
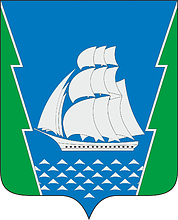
- Coat of arms
- Interactive map of De-Kastri
- Location of De-Kastri De-Kastri (Khabarovsk Krai)
- Coordinates: 51°28′45″N 140°46′16″E
- Country: Russia
- Federal subject: Khabarovsk Krai
- Administrative district: Ulchsky District
- Founded: 1853

Population (2010 Census)
  - Total: 3,238
  - Estimate (2021): 2,658 (−17.9%)
- Time zone: UTC+10 (MSK+7)
- Postal codes: 682000, 682400, 682429
- OKTMO ID: 08650413101

De-Kastri (Russian: Де-Ка́стри) is a rural locality (a settlement) in Ulchsky District of Khabarovsk Krai, Russia. Population: 3,238 (2010 census); 3,724 (2002 census).

== Etymology ==
The settlement's name is the Russian phonetic transliteration of the name of the Marquis de Castries, who sponsored the expedition of the French explorer La Pérouse, who was the first European to sight the bay where the settlement is located.

== Geography ==
The settlement is located on the Chikhachyova Bay, which was known as Bay of de Castries until 1952.

== History ==
This locality was named De-Kastri for the former name of the bay on which it stands. The bay was discovered by La Pérouse on July 25, 1787 and named after the sponsor of the expedition—the then Secretary of State of the French Navy, the Marquis de Castries. The bay is a convenient natural refuge for vessels, giving it strategic importance from a military viewpoint.

The settlement was founded in 1853, although the land where it was situated would not officially be Russian territory until the signing of the Treaty of Aigun five years later.

In 1854, the difficult task of defending Petropavlovsk-Kamchatsky when it came under siege from the British and French forces during the Crimean War brought to attention the difficulties of supply and defense of the Kamchatka Peninsula, where a large section of the Russian Pacific Fleet was based. It was decided to move the port from Kamchatka without waiting for another attack. In the spring of 1855, the Russian navy's weapons and sailors under the leadership of Rear Admiral Vasily Zavoyko headed toward the mouth of the Amur River; however, the river mouth was still covered with ice. It was decided to wait for the break-up, hiding in the Bay of de Castries from the superior forces of French and English. Russian ships were discovered there, but managed to escape to the Amur River in the Strait of Tartary before the arrival of enemy reinforcements. The British and French did not know that Sakhalin was an island, and spent the later years of the war waiting in vain for the Russian fleet at its southern coast.

Anton Chekhov visited the settlement in 1890, and described it in his book Sakhalin Island.

During the Russo-Japanese War, the Japanese landed at De-Kastri on July 10, 1905.

During the Russian Civil War, from January 11 to February 27, 1920, De-Kastri was occupied by the 48-man strong White Army detachment of Ivan Vits. The White Army was hoping to hold out in the village until the arrival of spring, to be rescued by sea by the Japanese. After a brief siege, De-Kastri was captured by the Red Army. Commander Vits was shot in the lighthouse at Kloster-Kamp (now Cape Orlov) in the settlement's vicinity.

During the 1930s and early 1940s, De-Kastri became the location of a naval outpost to protect against the Japanese, who until the end of World War II possessed the southern half of Sakhalin as Karafuto Prefecture. During the war, the bay sheltered Russian naval ships. The military installations were abandoned after the war, as the whole of the island of Sakhalin reverted to Russian control.

Under Joseph Stalin, De-Kastri became a gulag camp base, involved in coordinating part of the construction of a tunnel to Sakhalin beginning in 1950; specifically the construction of the railway connecting the planned tunnel with the rail network at Selikhino (near Komsomolsk-on-Amur). At its largest, the De-Kastri camp held 13,030 prisoners. The project was abandoned after the death of Stalin in 1953.

== Economy and infrastructure ==
Today, De-Kastri is a seaport associated with the oil and natural gas industry, with the De-Kastri terminal located nearby. It is connected by road to Komsomolsk-on-Amur.
