= Noosfera (icebreaker) =

Supply and research ship operated by the National Antarctic Scientific Center of Ukraine

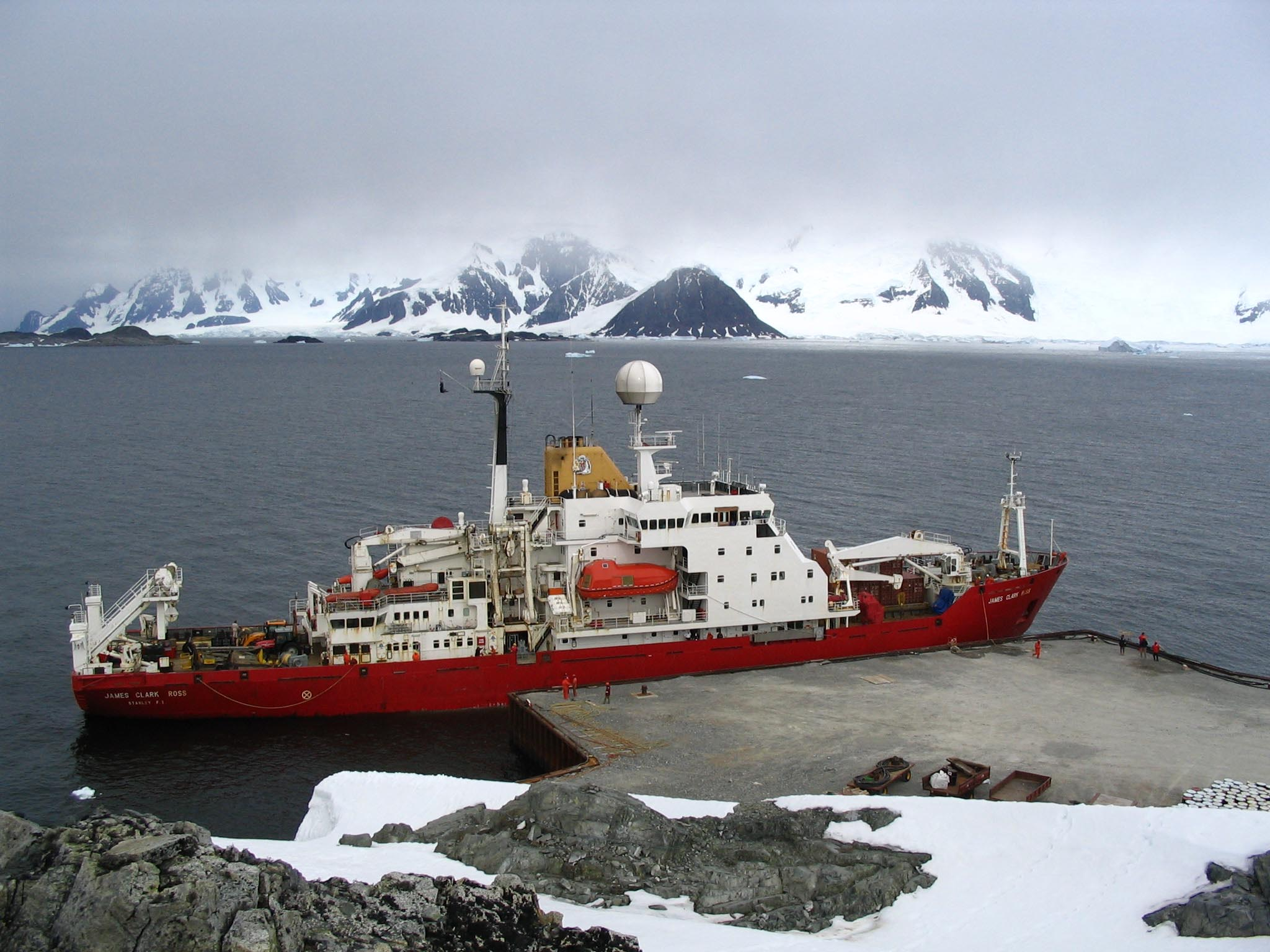
- RRS James Clark Ross at Rothera Research Station

United Kingdom
- Name: RRS James Clark Ross
- Namesake: James Clark Ross
- Operator: British Antarctic Survey
- Builder: Swan Hunter, Wallsend, England
- Launched: 1 December 1990
- Sponsored by: Queen Elizabeth II
- Out of service: March 2021
- Home port: Stanley, Falkland Islands
- Identification: IMO number: 8904496; MMSI number: 740339000; Callsign: ZDLP
- Fate: Sold to National Antarctic Scientific Center of Ukraine

History

Ukraine
- Name: Noosfera
- Namesake: research in the noosphere by Vladimir Vernadsky
- Owner: National Antarctic Scientific Center of Ukraine
- Operator: National Antarctic Scientific Center of Ukraine
- Acquired: 2021
- In service: August 2021
- Home port: Odesa, Ukraine
- Identification: IMO number: 8904496
- Status: In service

General characteristics
- Type: Research vessel
- Tonnage: 5,732 GT
- Displacement: 7,767 tonnes (loaded)
- Length: 99.04 m (324 ft 11 in)
- Beam: 18.85 m (61 ft 10 in)
- Draught: 6.30 m (20 ft 8 in)
- Propulsion: Diesel-electric; Single shaft (8,500 shp); fixed pitch propeller; Azimuthing bow and stern thrusters (10 tons and 4 tonnes of thrust, respectively)
- Speed: 12 knots (22 km/h; 14 mph)
- Endurance: 57 days
- Capacity: 1,500 m^{3} (53,000 cu ft) of general cargo; 250 tonnes of bulk aviation fuel; 300 tonnes of diesel fuel.
- Complement: 11 officers, 15 crew and up to 50 scientific personnel

Noosfera (Ukrainian: Ноосфера, lit. 'Noosphere') is a polar supply and research ship operated by the National Antarctic Scientific Center of Ukraine. Until 2021, she was operated by the British Antarctic Survey and named RRS James Clark Ross.

== History ==
=== British Antarctic Survey ===
RRS James Clark Ross was constructed at Swan Hunter in Wallsend, England and was named after the British explorer James Clark Ross. She replaced the RRS John Biscoe in 1991. She was launched by Queen Elizabeth II on 1 December 1990.

In March 2018, RRS James Clark Ross was due to sample the marine life around the world's biggest iceberg, A-68, but was unable to reach the site due to sea ice conditions.

After 30 years' service, James Clark Ross was sold to the National Antarctic Scientific Center of Ukraine, in August 2021.

== Gallery ==
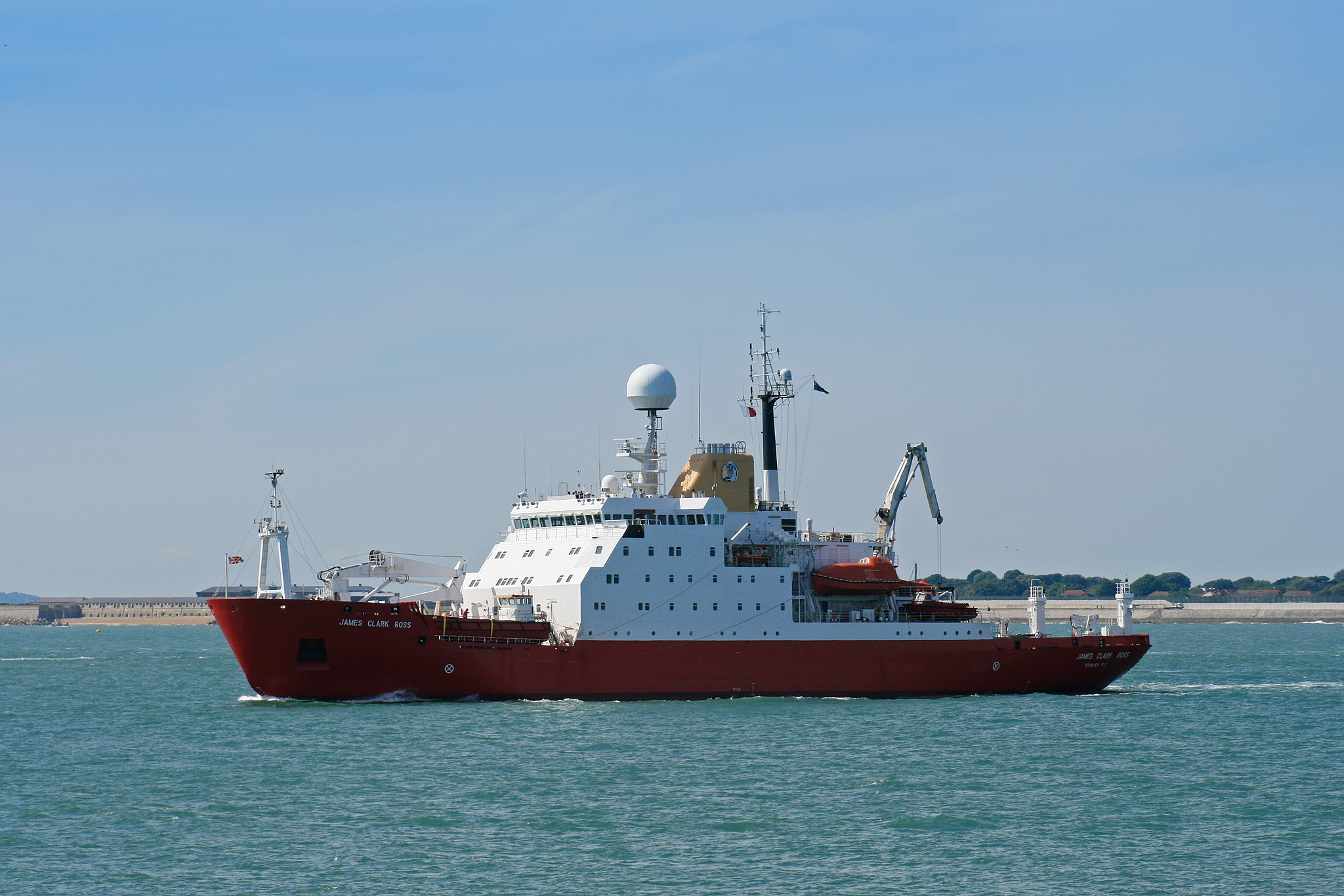
James Clark Ross outward bound from Portsmouth Naval Base 1 September 2010

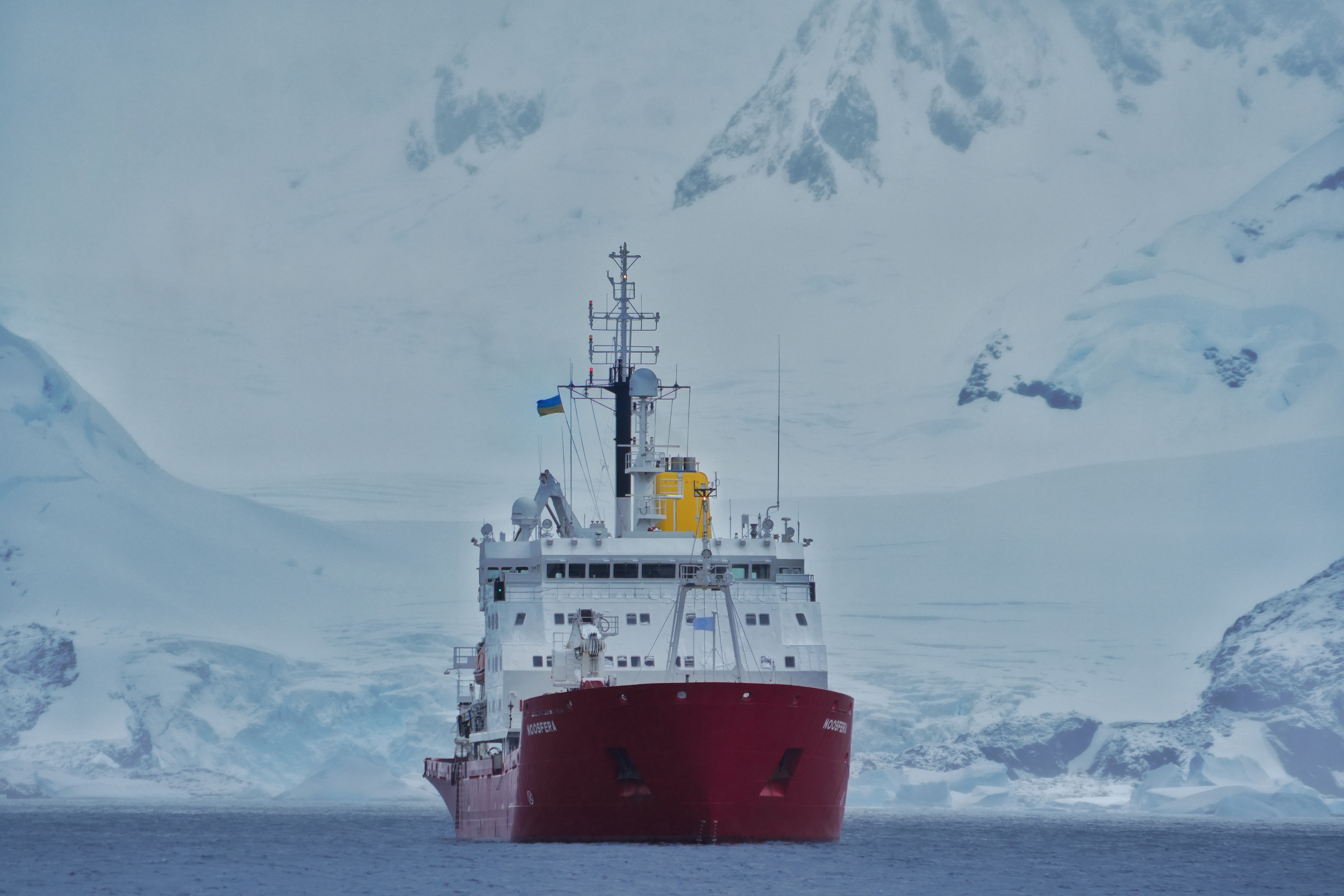
Noosfera in 2025

== See also ==
- Vernadsky Research Base
- RRS Ernest Shackleton, a former British Antarctic Survey Royal Research Ship.
- RRS Sir David Attenborough, a new Royal Research Ship which entered service in 2021.
- James Ross Island
