= Extended reach drilling =

Technique used to drill long horizontal wells

Extended Reach Drilling (ERD) is directional drilling of very long non-vertical wells. The aims of ERD are: a) to reach a larger area from one surface drilling location, and b) to keep a well in a reservoir for a longer distance in order to maximize its productivity and drainage capability.

Challenges in ERD are hole cleaning, managing the mechanical loads on the drill string and downhole pressure, and cost.

== Definition ==
Early ERD-well definitions related wells to those that exceeded some step-out/vertical-depth ratio (often 2:1). However, for most highly deviated wells in deepwater environments, this definition clearly does not fit. Some methods have evolved to categorize wells according to their stepout within different vertical-depth ranges. ERD wells then can be described conveniently as shallow, intermediate, deep, and ultradeep. Other variants are associated with operating in deep water and high-pressure/high-temperature environments. Currently, there is no generally accepted ERD-well definition.

What exactly determines a well to be "extended reach" varies over time and location with the development of technologies and of experiences.

- On 24 April 2015 the world's longest borehole was drilled and completed from the Orlan Platform in the Chayvo Field, Sakhalin-1 Project with a total measured depth of 13,500 m (44,294 ft) and a horizontal displacement of 12,030 m (39,469 ft)
- The previous world record was drilled and completed 30 March 2014 by the Yastreb land drilling rig in the Chayvo Field, Sakhalin-1 Project to a total measured depth of 13,000 m (42,653 ft) and a horizontal displacement of 12,130 m (39,797 ft)

== New developments ==
New technologies have emerged that claim to be pushing the existing boundaries of ERD. One of these is the Reelwell Drilling Method.

== See also ==
- Underbalanced drilling
- Well drilling
- Drilling fluid
- Lost circulation
