= National Institute of Oceanography and Applied Geophysics =

Italian scientific institute

The National Institute of Oceanography and Applied Geophysics (Italian: Istituto Nazionale di Oceanografia e di Geofisica Sperimentale), commonly referred to as OGS, is an Italian public research institution under the supervision of the Italian Ministry of University and Research. It specializes in conducting research in the fields of earth science and oceanography on an international level.

== History ==
On 20 August 1753, the Jesuits established the School of Astronomy and Navigation in response to a request from Empress Maria Theresa of Austria. This school was established to meet the development needs of the free port of Trieste. Over time, the institute underwent several reorganizations and name changes. In 1958, it was established as the Trieste Applied Geophysical Observatory; later in 1999, it was renamed to the National Institute of Oceanography and Applied Geophysics.

== Locations ==
The primary headquarters of the National Institute of Oceanography and Applied Geophysics (OGS) are located in Sgonico (Trieste), Trieste, and Udine.

In addition to these main offices, OGS has also established new offices and laboratories in the following locations:

1. Venice
2. Latera (Viterbo)
3. Panarea (Messina)

== Research infrastructures ==
Since 2019, OGS has been operating the Italian icebreaker R/V Laura Bassi, specifically designed for polar regions, to support the objectives of the National Antarctic Research Program and Italian research in polar areas. This vessel works in conjunction with the R/V OGS Explora, which has been involved in Italian polar scientific research since 1989.

OGS holds the national coordination role for the following European infrastructures (ESFRI):

- EURO-ARGO: The European component of the global system for in situ observation of oceans, polar seas, and marginal seas.
- ECCSEL: The European infrastructure focused on the capture, utilization, and storage of carbon dioxide.

In addition to this, OGS actively participates in other European infrastructures related to Earth and Ocean Sciences, which are coordinated by other research bodies. These infrastructures include EUROFLEETS, EMSO, EPOS LIFEWATCH-Italy, EMBRC-IT, ICOS, and ECORD.
