= RRS John Biscoe (1956) =

Supply and research vessel used by the British Antarctic Survey between 1956 and 1991

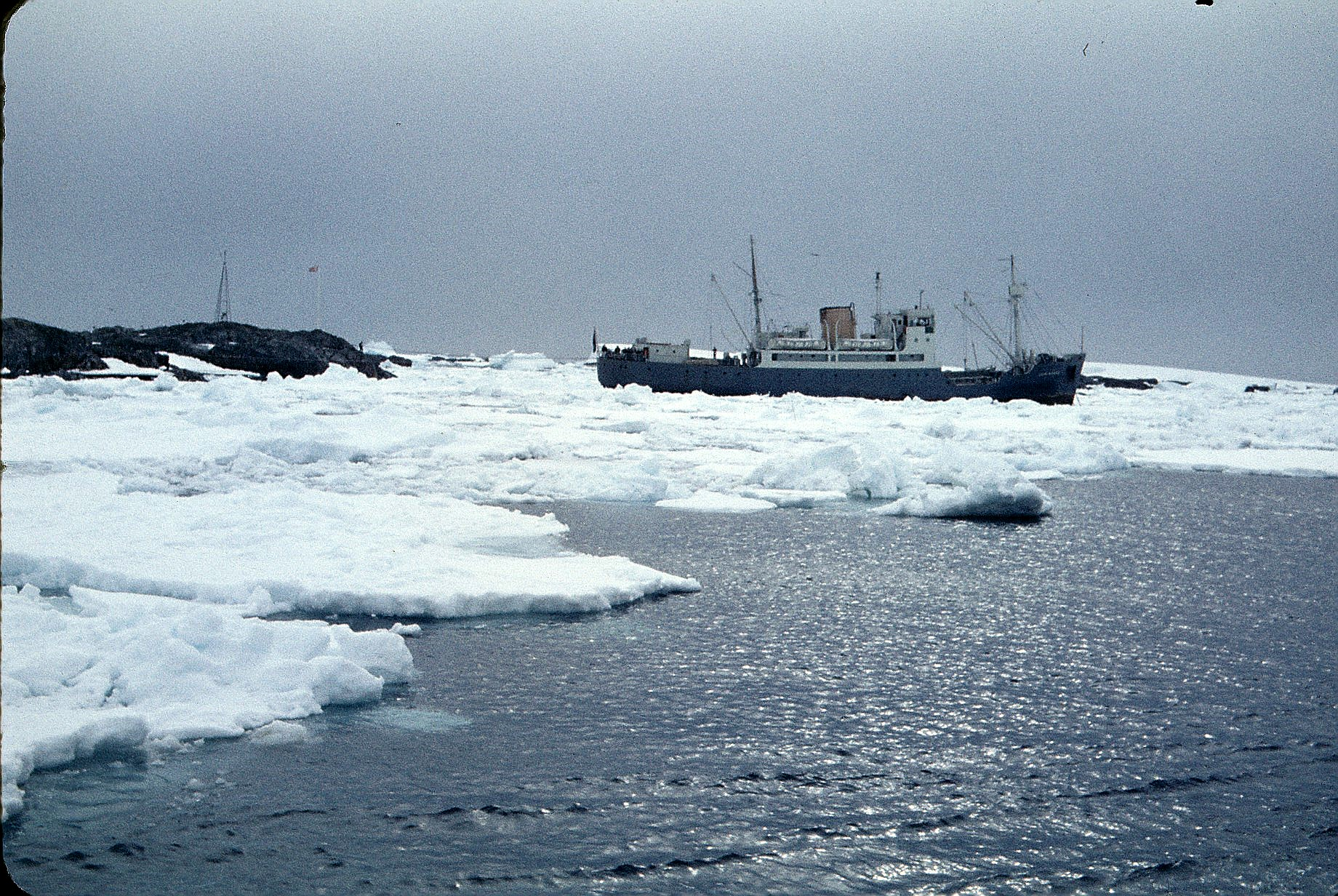
- John Biscoe resupplying Base F in 1958

History

United Kingdom
- Namesake: John Biscoe
- Operator: British Antarctic Survey
- Builder: Fleming & Ferguson, Paisley
- Yard number: 778
- Launched: 11 June 1956
- In service: 1956
- Out of service: 1991
- Homeport: Stanley, Falkland Islands
- Identification: IMO number: 5173321
- Fate: Sold 1992

Cyprus
- Name: Fayza Express
- Operator: Fayza Shipping Co. Ltd.
- Identification: IMO number: 5173321
- Fate: Scrapped 2 March 2004 at Aliaga, Turkey

General characteristics
- Class & type: Royal Research Ship; survey vessel; later used as passenger/cargo vessel
- Tonnage: 1,554 GRT; 615 NRT
- Length: 220 ft (67 m)
- Beam: 40 ft (12 m)
- Draught: 18.42 ft (5.61 m)
- Propulsion: Diesel electric
- Complement: 33 crew, 34 scientists

The RRS John Biscoe was a supply and research vessel used by the British Antarctic Survey between 1956 and 1991.

== History ==
An earlier vessel, RRS John Biscoe (1944) operated from 1947 to 1956. Both were named after the English explorer John Biscoe, who discovered parts of Antarctica in the early 1830s.

John Biscoe II was replaced by RRS James Clark Ross in 1991. After decommissioning, she was sold under the name Fayza Express and eventually scrapped in 2004.

== Command ==
Biscoe's first visit to Halley Research Station, in 1959/60 was under the veteran captain, Bill Johnston.

From 1975, joint Masters of John Biscoe were Malcolm Phelps and Chris Elliott. Chris Elliott had joined BAS as Third Officer on John Biscoe in 1967, becoming Second Officer in 1970. He established the successful Offshore Biological Programme cruises and helped superintend the building of replacement James Clark Ross. Elliott was awarded the Polar Medal in 2004 and an MBE in 2005. The sea passage between Adelaide Island and Jenny Island is named after Chris Elliott.
