= National Antarctic Scientific Center of Ukraine =

- Національний антарктичний науковий центр
- Abbreviation: NANC
- Formation: 1993; 32 years ago
- Legal status: Government agency
- Purpose: Scientific research and surveys in the Antarctic
- Headquarters: Kyiv
- Region served: Ukraine
- Director: Yevhen Dykyi
- Parent organization: Ministry of Education and Science of Ukraine
- Website: www.uac.gov.ua

The National Antarctic Scientific Center (NANC) (Ukrainian: Національний антарктичний науковий центр, romanized: Natsionalnyi antarktychnyi naukovyi tsentr, abbreviated as НАНЦ) is an organization of the Ukrainian government, part of the Ministry of Education and Science of Ukraine. The center operates Vernadsky Research Base and coordinates Ukrainian research of Antarctic. Since 2021, it has operated the polar supply and research ship Noosfera.

The National Antarctic Scientific Center of Ukraine (NASC) was designated as the lead institution of the Ukrainian IPY Initiative Group for the International Polar Year 2007-2008.

== Goals ==
The body's goals are:

- development and implementation of research programs in Antarctica;
- ensuring further development of Vernadsky Research Base;
- interdisciplinary research in the field of environmental protection.

== Leaders ==
- Petro Hozhyk (1996–1999);
- Valerii Lytvynov (1999–2018);
- Yevhen Dykyi since 2018.

== Links ==
- Official website of the National Antarctic Science Center
