= Exxon Neftegas =

Defunct Russian subsidiary of ExxonMobil

Exxon Neftegas Limited
- Native name: Эксон Нефтегаз Лимитед
- Type: Subsidiary
- Industry: Petroleum
- Founded: April 26, 2001; 25 years ago
- Defunct: March 1, 2022; 4 years ago
- Fate: Dissolved as a result of the 2022 Russian invasion of Ukraine
- Headquarters: Moscow, Russia
- Parent: ExxonMobil
- Website: sakhalin-1.com, archived from the original (today offline)

Exxon Neftegas Limited (ENL; Russian: Эксон Нефтегаз Лимитед) is a defunct subsidiary of the American oil company ExxonMobil which operated mostly in Russia, notably Sakhalin and other parts of the Far East. ENL was the primary American operator (as well as 30% owner) of Sakhalin-I Consortium, which oversaw exploration and production of oil and gas on both Sakhalin island and in the Chayvo, Odoptu and Arkutun-Dagi fields in the Sea of Okhotsk. The subsidiary is incorporated in the Bahamas and has an office in Yuzhno-Sakhalinsk. Exxon Neftgas was led by future ExxonMobil CEO Rex Tillerson from 1998 to at least May 2001.

== Founding ==
ENL was first founded on April 26, 2001, when ABB and ExxonMobil signed an agreement for ABB to design the front-end systems of the Sakhalin-I project's first phase. ENL was formally declared as commercial on October 29 of that same year, representing a $12 billion USD ($20 billion today) investment, the largest foreign direct investment into Russia at the time.

Across the 2000s, ENL awarded multiple contracts for logistics relating to the project, including Amur Shipbuilding Plant, Sakhalinskiye Aviatrassy, Fesco Transport, Vostok Aviation, Sovcomflot, and Lukoil. On July 12, 2003, ENL began drilling at the Chavyo wellsite, the project's first extended-reach drillsite. Later in 2005, ExxonMobil announced that ENL has start up production on the project, and that by 2006, the project could produce 250,000 barrels per day.

In 2007, ENL broke a world drilling record for the world's longest extended-reach oil well at 37,016 feet; it superseded its record in 2008 by 1,306 more feet. Also in 2007, ENL announced it had passed 100 million barrels produced from Sakhalin.

== Fate ==
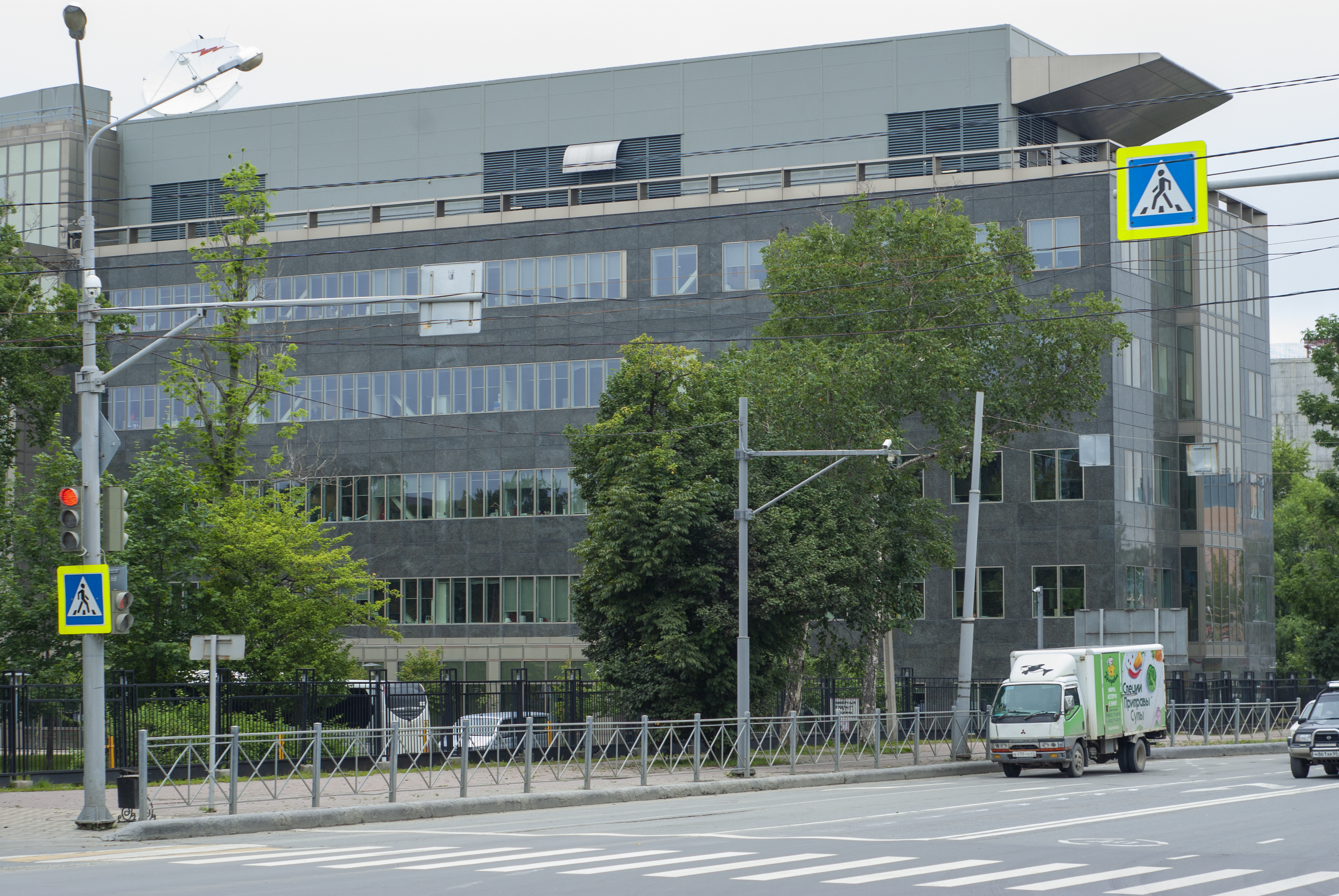
Office building of Exxon Neftegas in Yuzhno-Sakhalinsk (2022)

Upon Russia's 2022 invasion of Ukraine, Exxon announced that it would pull out of Russia immediately, including ENL and the Sakhalin-I project. Exxon's pullout announcement was published on March 1, 2022, and paired with statement in support of Ukraine, though Russia attempted to halt the pullout by passing legislation which barred energy companies based in "unfriendly countries" from pulling out of Russian energy projects. ExxonMobil responded by announcing that it would sue the Federal government of Russia in August unless it would be allowed to exit the country.
