= GC Rieber Shipping =

Norwegian shipping company

GC Rieber Shipping AS
- Company type: Private
- Industry: Shipping
- Founded: 1981
- Headquarters: Bergen, Norway
- Area served: Global
- Key people: Einar Ytredal, CEO (2018–).
- Revenue: NOK 392 million (2007)
- Operating income: NOK 169 million (2007)
- Net income: NOK 39 million (2007)
- Website: www.gcrieber-shipping.com

GC Rieber Shipping (OSE: RISH) is a Norwegian shipping company that operates offshore subsea support vessels, marine seismic vessels and polar logistics and research expeditions. Based in Bergen, Norway it is listed on the Oslo Stock Exchange. A major owner is GC Rieber.

== History ==
The company dates back to the establishment of G.C. Rieber & Co. AS in 1879. The company started with shipping in the 1930s and soon entered both the polar exploration field and in 1965 the seismic shipping field in the North Sea. Through the 1970s the company specialized in Arctic and Antarctic research expeditions and in 1981 the division was established as a separate company, Rieber Shipping A/S. The company has since established an in-house design department for the specialized vessels.

== Business ==
The company operates in three related markets, Subsea, Ice/Support and Marine Seismic. GC Rieber Shipping has a 65% stake in Armada Seismic, a 50% stake in the subsea services company Reef Subsea and a 73% stake in environmental monitoring company Octio.

== Fleet ==
The company has owned several vessels that are periodically leased to other contractors, and also leases vessels from others as well.

Subsea

- Polar Prince (built 1999 at Flekkefjord Yard, sold to the greek Asso-Group in 2015, renamed to Aethra)
- Polar King (built 2011 at Freire Shipyard, Spain, sold to the greek Asso-Group in August 2020, renamed to Argo)
- Polar Queen (built 2011 at Freire Shipyard, Spain, sold to the Schmidt Ocean Institute in March 2021, retrofitted to an oceanographic research vessel and renamed to RV Falkor (too))
- Polar Onyx (built 2014 at Ulstein Verft, sold to Taiwanese offshore wind company Dong Fang Offshore in December 2021)

Ice / Support

- Polar Pevek – icebreaker/support vessel (built 2006 at Aker Yars Aukra)
- Polar Piltun – crew boat (built 1998, converted 2009, at Kværner Fjellstrand)
- Polar Baikal – crew boat (built 2000, converted 2009, at Kværner Fjellstrand)
- RRS Ernest Shackleton – icebreaker (built 1995 at Kverner Kleven Leirvik)

Marine Seismic

- MV Polar Princess (built 1985)
- Polar Empress (built 2015 at Kleven Myklebust)
- Polar Duke (built 2010 at Factorias Juliana)
- Polar Duchess (built 2011 at Factorias Juliana)
- Polar Marquis (built 2000, bought 2009 as Geo Atlantic, renovated and renamed 2014, at Flekkefjord Slipp & Maskinfabrikk)
