= King Haakon VII Sea =

Proposed name for part of the Southern Ocean on the coast of East Antarctica

Overview of the proposed King Haakon VII Sea at top of the map.

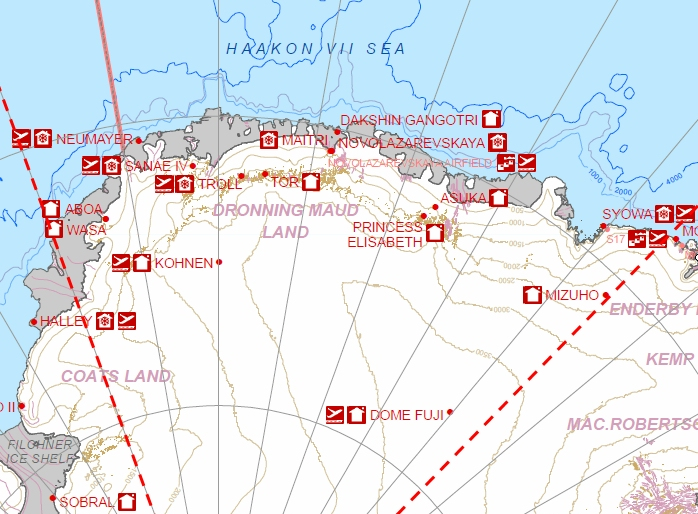
Area map of King Haakon VII Sea proposal.

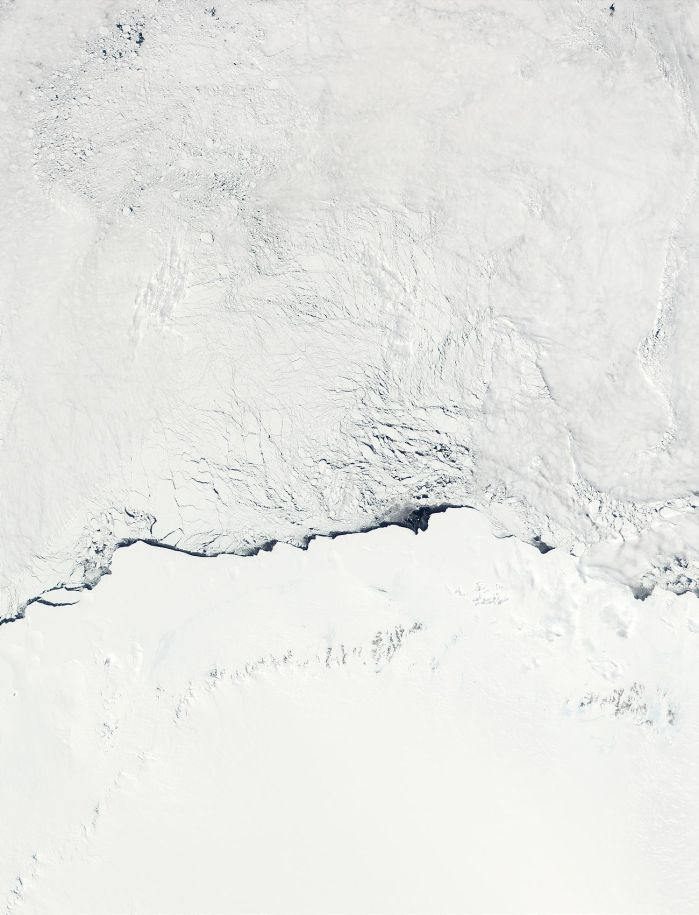
Overview map: Crown Princess Märtha Kyst, Princess Astrid Kyst and Princess Ragnhild Kyst.

King Haakon VII Sea (Norwegian: Kong Håkon VII Hav) is a proposed name for part of the Southern Ocean on the coast of East Antarctica.

== Geography ==
The International Hydrographic Organization (IHO), often recognized as the authority for worldwide water body names, does not include this sea name. The IHO 2002 draft was never approved by the IHO (or any other organization), and the 1953 IHO document (which does not contain the name) remains currently in force. Most leading geographic authorities and atlases do not use the name, including the 2014 10th edition World Atlas from the National Geographic Society.

By a narrow proposed definition, this sea would be between the Weddell Sea and a proposed Lazarev Sea name, and thus stretch only along Princess Martha Coast from Cape Norvegia at 12°18′W, the easternmost point of the Weddell Sea, to Fimbul Ice Shelf close to the Prime Meridian at 0°0′, which is proposed as the western border of Lazarev Sea.

From the Norwegian point of view, which also does not recognize Lazarev Sea, King Haakon VII Sea is situated along the entire coast of Queen Maud Land between 20°W and 45°E and stretches for about 10,090 km (6,270 mi) from the Stancomb-Wills Glacier at 19°W on Princess Martha Coast in the west to Shinnan Glacier at 44°38′E on the eastern border of Prince Olav Coast in the east.

The water here is covered by ice most of the year. During autumn pack ice forms which does not break up until spring. The rough coordinates of the proposed sea area would be 67°S 20°E.

The area is an important habitat for the Ross seal (Ommatophoca rossii).

== History ==
On 27 January 1820 Russian Fabian Gottlieb von Bellingshausen made the first confirmed sighting of Terra Australis (Antarctica) as he was cruising this area near the Fimbul Ice Shelf at Princess Märtha Coast.

The area is named in honour of Haakon VII, the first king of Norway after the dissolution from Sweden.
