= List of Antarctic features named after Norwegian royalty =

A number of Antarctic features were named after Norwegian royal family members. This is due to either the name being bestowed by Roald Amundsen when he reached the South Pole as the first person in 1911, or due to Norwegian feats of exploration or claims on the area.

- King Haakon VII Vidde was the name given to the entire plateau surrounding the South Pole in honour of King Haakon VII of Norway, now denoted the Antarctic Plateau.
- Queen Maud Land is named in honour of Queen Maud of Norway. Five sectors of Queen Maud Land have been named after other members of the royal family:
  - Prins Olav Kyst
  - Kronprinsesse Märtha Kyst
  - Prinsesse Astrid Kyst
  - Prinsesse Ragnhild Kyst
  - Prins Harald Kyst
- Dronning Maud Fjellene
- Prins Olav Fjellene
