= Partizan Island =

Island in Antarctica

- Location within Antarctica

Geography
- Location: Antarctica
- Coordinates: 68°31′S 78°10′E

Administration
- Administered under the Antarctic Treaty System

Demographics
- Population: Uninhabited

Partizan Island is an island in Antarctica. This hook-shaped island 5.6 kilometres (3 nmi) long lies in the middle of the entrance to Langnes Fjord, Vestfold Hills. Mapped by Norwegian cartographers from air photos taken by the Lars Christensen Expedition (1936–37). They gave the name Onguloy (Fishook Island), but that name might be confused with the better known Ongul Island, the site of recent Japanese Antarctic Research Expeditions. The area was subsequently photographed from the air by U.S. Navy Operation Highjump (1946–47), ANARE (Australian National Antarctic Research Expeditions) (1954–58), and the Soviet Antarctic Expedition (1956). It was renamed Ostrov Partizan (Partisan Island) by the Soviet expedition.

== See also ==
- List of antarctic and sub-antarctic islands
