= Kaname Island =

Island in Antarctica

- Location within Antarctica

Geography
- Location: Antarctica
- Coordinates: 69°21′S 37°36′E

Administration
- Administered under the Antarctic Treaty System

Demographics
- Population: Uninhabited

Kaname Island is a small, isolated island which lies about 40 kilometres (22 nmi) northwest of Padda Island in Lützow-Holm Bay, Antarctica. The island was discovered by the Japanese Antarctic Research Expedition (JARE) during helicopter reconnaissance flights from East Ongul Island in the 1969–70 season. The name "Kaname-jima" (chief or important island) was given by JARE Headquarters in 1972.

== See also ==
- List of antarctic and sub-antarctic islands
