= Riiser-Larsen =

Riiser-Larsen may refer to:

- Hjalmar Riiser-Larsen
- Riiser-Larsen Ice Shelf
- Riiser-Larsen Peninsula
- Riiser-Larsen Sea
- Mount Riiser-Larsen
