= Topografov Island =

Island in Antarctica

Topografov Island (68°30′S 78°11′E) is an island just north of Partizan Island in the north part of the entrance to Langnes Fjord, Vestfold Hills in Antarctica. Mapped by Norwegian cartographers from air photos taken by the Lars Christensen Expedition (1936–37). Subsequently, photographed by U.S. Navy Operation Highjump (1946–47), ANARE (Australian National Antarctic Research Expeditions) (1954–58) and the Soviet Antarctic Expedition (1956). The latter named it Ostrov Topografov (topographers' island).

== See also ==
- List of antarctic and sub-antarctic islands
