= Honnør Glacier =

Glacier in Antarctica

- Location of Queen Maud Land in Antarctica

- Location within Antarctica
- Location: Queen Maud Land
- Coordinates: 69°23′S 39°50′E
- Thickness: unknown
- Terminus: Lützow-Holm Bay
- Status: unknown

Honnør Glacier (69°23′S 39°50′E) is a glacier flowing to the east side of Lützow-Holm Bay, Antarctica, to the north of the Byvågåsane Peaks. A glacier tongue extending seaward from this feature was mapped by the Lars Christensen Expedition 1936–37 and named Honnørbrygga (the honor wharf). The Japanese Antarctic Research Expedition, 1957–62, found the glacier tongue had broken off but amended the original naming to apply to the glacier.

== See also ==
- List of glaciers in the Antarctic
- Glaciology
