= Minamo Island =

Island in Antarctica

- Location within Antarctica

Geography
- Location: Antarctica
- Coordinates: 69°39′S 39°37′E

Administration
- Administered under the Antarctic Treaty System

Demographics
- Population: Uninhabited

Minamo Island is the largest of several small islands which lie in the narrow inlet between the Skallen Hills and Skallen Glacier, along the coast of Queen Maud Land, Antarctica. It was mapped from surveys and air photos by the Japanese Antarctic Research Expedition (JARE), 1957–62, and was named by JARE Headquarters in 1972.

== See also ==
- List of antarctic and sub-antarctic islands
