= Flein Island =

Island in Antarctica

- Location within Antarctica

Geography
- Location: Antarctica
- Coordinates: 69°45′S 39°5′E

Administration
- Administered under the Antarctic Treaty System

Demographics
- Population: Uninhabited

Flein Island (Norwegian: Fleinøya) is a small island lying 0.7 kilometres (0.4 nmi) north of Berr Point in the southeast part of Lutzow-Holm Bay. Norwegian cartographers working from air photos taken by the Lars Christensen Expedition, 1936–37, mapped this feature as two islands, applying the name Fleinoya (the bare island) to the larger. The Japanese Antarctic Research Expedition, 1957–1962, determined that only one island exists in this position and retained the name given earlier for the larger island.

== See also ==
- List of antarctic and sub-antarctic islands
