= Nøkkelholmane Islands =

Islands in Antarctica

- Location within Antarctica

Geography
- Location: Antarctica
- Coordinates: 69°24′S 39°29′E

Administration
- Administered under the Antarctic Treaty System

Demographics
- Population: Uninhabited

The Nøkkelholmane Islands are a scattered group of about 24 islands and rocks lying just off the west side of Skarvsnes Foreland in the east part of Lutzow-Holm Bay. They were mapped by Norwegian cartographers from air photos taken by the Lars Christensen Expedition, 1936–37, and named Nøkkelholmane (the key island).

The largest island in the group is Nøkkel Island.

== See also ==
- List of antarctic and sub-antarctic islands
