= Narabi Rocks =

Three aligned rocks off Queen Maud Land, Antarctica

Narabi Rocks (68°24′S 41°47′E) is a three aligned rocks extending nearly 3 nautical miles (6 km) along the coast, between Temmondai Rock and Kozo Rock, in Queen Maud Land. Mapped from surveys and air photos by Japanese Antarctic Research Expedition (JARE), 1957–62, and named Narabi-iwa (row rocks).
