= Seal Bay (Antarctica) =

Bay in Antarctica

Coordinates: 71°45′S 12°45′W

Seal Bay (Norwegian: Selbukta) is a bay which indents the northeastern end of Riiser-Larsen Ice Shelf just southward of Cape Norvegia, on the coast of Queen Maud Land. It was discovered in the year 1930 by Capt. Hjalmar Riiser-Larsen and so named by him because of the abundance of seals in the bay.
