= Trilling Islands =

Islands in Antarctica

Trilling Islands (69°30′S 39°38′E) is a three islands at the south side of Skarvsnes Foreland, lying in Trilling Bay in the east part of Lutzow-Holm Bay. Mapped by Norwegian cartographers from air photos taken by the Lars Christensen Expedition, 1936–37, and named Trillingoyane (the triplet islands).

== See also ==
- List of antarctic and sub-antarctic islands
