= Rumpa Island =

Island in Antarctica

Rumpa Island (69°8′S 39°26′E) is an island in the east part of Lutzow-Holm Bay, 5 nautical miles (9 km) northwest of Langhovde-kita Point. Mapped by Norwegian cartographers from air photos taken by the Lars Christensen Expedition, 1936–37, and named Rumpa (the rump).

Ōgi Beach is a beach at the head of the cove in southern Rumpa Island. It was mapped by the Japanese Antarctic Research Expedition (JARE). The name Ōgi-hama, meaning "fan beach," was applied by JARE Headquarters in 1973.

== See also ==
- List of antarctic and sub-antarctic islands
