= Hiroe =

- Gender: Female

Origin
- Origin: Japanese
- Meaning: Different meanings depending on the kanji used

Hiroe (written: 博恵, 博江, 浩江, 宏江, 寛恵 or 弘恵) is a feminine Japanese given name. Notable people with the name include:

- Hiroe Amano (天野 博江; born 1943), Japanese badminton player
- Hiroe Igeta (井桁 弘恵; born 1997), Japanese model and actress
- Hiroe Kakizaki (柿崎 宏江; born 1969), Japanese women's basketball player
- Hiroe Makiyama (牧山 弘恵; born 1964), Japanese politician
- Hiroe Minagawa (皆川 博恵; born 1987), Japanese sport wrestler
- Hiroe Nakai (中井 広恵; born 1969), Japanese shogi player
- Hiroe Oka (岡 寛恵; born 1971), Japanese actress and voice actress
- Hiroe Suga (菅 浩江; born 1963), Japanese writer
- Hiroe Yuki (湯木 博恵; 1948–2011), Japanese badminton player

Hiroe (written: 広江) is also a Japanese surname. Notable people with the surname include:

- Rei Hiroe (広江 礼威; born 1972), Japanese manga artist

== See also ==
- Mount Hiroe, a mountain in Queen Maud Land, Antarctica
- Hiroe Point, a headland in Queen Maud Land, Antarctica
