= Einstødingen Island =

Island in Antarctica

- Location within Antarctica

Geography
- Location: Antarctica
- Coordinates: 69°39′S 38°50′E

Administration
- Administered under the Antarctic Treaty System

Demographics
- Population: Uninhabited

Einstødingen Island is a lone island lying 19 kilometres (10 nmi) east of Padda Island in southern Lutzow-Holm Bay. It was mapped by Norwegian cartographers from air photos taken by the Lars Christensen Expedition, 1936–37, and named "Einstødingen" (the hermit) because of its isolated position.

== See also ==
- List of antarctic and sub-antarctic islands
