= Gobanme Rock =

Gobamme Rock (碁盤目岩, Gobanme-iwa, 68°22′S 41°56′E) is an exposed rock standing on the coast between Kozō Rock and Byōbu Rock in Queen Maud Land, Antarctica. It was mapped from surveys and air photos by the Japanese Antarctic Research Expedition, 1957–62, and named Gobanme-iwa (checkerboard rock).
