= Prince Olav =

Prince Olav or Prins Olav may refer to

People

Prince Olav of Norway (Norwegian: Prins Olav) (1903-91), the future King Olav V held this title between 1905 and 1957.

Places

- Prince Olav Coast, part of Queen Maud Land, Antarctica
- Prince Olav Mountains, Queen Maud Land, Antarctica

Ships

- SS Prins Olav, a Norwegian passenger ship in service 1925-40
