= Byobu (disambiguation) =

Byobu or Byōbu may refer to:

- Byōbu: Japanese folding screens
- Byobu Rock: a large rock on the coast of Queen Maud Land
- Byobu (software): an enhancement for GNU Screen or tmux
