= Suribachi (disambiguation) =

Suribachi can refer to:

- Suribachi, Japanese mortar
- Mount Suribachi, mountain on Iwo Jima, Japan
- Mount Suribachi (Antarctica), mountain in Antarctica
- USS Suribachi (AE-21), ship of the United States Navy
- Suribachi-class ammunition ship, class of ship of United States Navy
