= Kozō Rock =

Exposed rock standing on the coast of Antarctica

Kozō Rock (68°23′S 41°54′E) is an exposed rock standing on the coast between the Narabi Rocks and Gobamme Rock in Queen Maud Land, Antarctica. It was mapped from surveys and air photos by the Japanese Antarctic Research Expedition, 1957–62, and named Kozō-iwa (youngster rock).
