= Systerflesene Islands =

Islands in Antarctica

Systerflesene Islands (69°17′S 39°25′E) is a group of three small islands lying 5 miles (8 km) west of Hamnenabben Head in the east part of Lutzow-Holm Bay. Mapped by Norwegian cartographers from air photos taken by the Lars Christensen Expedition, 1936–37, and named "Systerflesene" (the sister islets).

== See also ==
- List of antarctic and sub-antarctic islands
