= Nesøya =

Nesøya may refer to:

- Nesøya, Akershus, an island in Asker municipality, Norway (just outside Oslo)
- Nesøya, Nordland, an island in Rødøy municipality, Norway
- Nesøya (Antarctica), an island in Antarctica
