= Mount Hiroe =

Mountain in Antarctica

Mount Hiroe (69°21′S 39°47′E) is a rocky mountain, 316 metres (1,037 ft) high, situated 0.5 nautical miles (0.9 km) northwest of Breidvågnipa Peak and 1.3 nautical miles (2.4 km) northeast of Hiroe Point, on the coast of Queen Maud Land, Antarctica. It was first mapped by H.E. Hansen from air photos taken by the Lars Christensen Expedition, 1936–37. The name "Hiroe-yama" (broad bay mountain) was applied by the headquarters of the Japanese Antarctic Research Expedition in 1973 and follows Japanese research in this area.
