= Shinnan Rocks =

Area of coastal rocks in Antarctica

Coordinates: 67°57′S 44°33′E

Shinnan Rocks is a substantial area of exposed coastal rocks at the west side of Shinnan Glacier in Queen Maud Land. Mapped from surveys and air photos by the Japanese Antarctic Research Expedition (JARE), 1957–1962, and named Shinnan-iwa (new south rocks).
