= East Ongul Island =

Island in Antarctica

- Location within Antarctica

Geography
- Location: Antarctica
- Coordinates: 69°1′S 39°35′E

Administration
- Administered under the Antarctic Treaty System

Demographics
- Population: Uninhabited

East Ongul Island is an island in the Flatvaer Islands off of Antarctica. It is 2 kilometres (1 nmi) long, lying immediately east of the northern part of Ongul Island at the east side of the entrance of Lutzow-Holm Bay.

East Ongul Island this island was originally mapped as a part of Ongul Island by Norwegian cartographers who worked from air photos taken by the Lars Christensen Expedition (LCE), 1936–37. In 1957, the Japanese Antarctic Research Expedition (JARE) discovered the Nakano-seto Strait, a small strait separating Ongul and East Ongul islands. The name Ongul Island was retained for the largest island in the group, and the smaller island was given the name East Ongul Island. Showa Station, a Japanese permanent research station, was built on East Ongul Island in 1957.

== Named features ==
Both the Lars Christensen Expedition (LCE) and the later Japanese Antarctic Research Expedition (JARE) mapped and named many features on and around East Ongul Island. Unless noted below, all names were applied by JARE.

Tachimachi Point is a low, snow-covered point which marks the northeast extremity of East Ongul Island. The name Tachimachi-misaki, meaning "stand and wait point," was given by JARE Headquarters in 1972. Kitano-ura Cove, meaning "northern cove," indents the island's northern side. Miharashi Peak, a hill 40 metres (130 ft) high, is the highest point in the northeastern extremity of East Ongul Island. Its name means "extensive view peak".

Nishino-ura Cove indents the western side of East Ongul Island. First mapped from LCE photographs, it was named Nishino-ura, or "western cove," by JARE. On southern part of the cove is Kitami Beach, meaning "north-looking beach." 0.2 nautical miles (0.4 km) south of that is Kaino-hama Beach, meaning "beach of shells."

The highest point on the island is Hachinosu Peak ("beehive peak"), a small hill 45 metres (150 ft) high. It sits 0.2 miles (0.3 km) east of Nishino-ura Cove. Mizukumi Stream, a small meltwater stream, sits 0.1 nautical miles (0.2 km) north of Hachinosu Peak. Its name comes from Mizukumizawa and means "water-drawing stream."

On the southern portion of the island there are a number of small lakes. 0.3 nautical miles (0.6 km) southeast of Hachinosu sits Lake Midori, a small lake whose name means "green pond". Lake Kamome ("seagull pond") sits just southeast. Lake Tarachine sits to the south of Kamome, with Lake Minami just to the south of Tarachine.

== See also ==
- List of antarctic and sub-antarctic islands
- A Place Further than the Universe
