= Ytrehovdeholmen Island =

Island in Antarctica

- Location within Antarctica

Geography
- Location: Antarctica
- Coordinates: 69°13′S 39°28′E

Administration
- Administered under the Antarctic Treaty System

Demographics
- Population: Uninhabited

Ytrehovdeholmen Island is the largest of four islands in a cluster. It lies 7 kilometres (4 nmi) west of Langhovde Hills in the east part of Lutzow-Holm Bay. Mapped by Norwegian cartographers from air photos taken by the Lars Christensen Expedition, 1936–37, and named Ytrehovdeholmen (the outer knoll island) because of its position among the islands adjacent to Langhovde Hills.

== See also ==
- List of antarctic and sub-antarctic islands
