= Langhovde Glacier =

Glacier in Antarctica

- Location of Queen Maud Land in Antarctica

- Location within Antarctica
- Location: Queen Maud Land
- Coordinates: 69°13′S 39°48′E
- Length: 8 nmi (15 km; 9 mi)
- Thickness: unknown
- Terminus: Lützow-Holm Bay
- Status: unknown

Langhovde Glacier (69°13′S 39°48′E) is a glacier at the east side of the Langhovde Hills, flowing north to Hovde Bay on the east shore of Lützow-Holm Bay, Antarctica. It was mapped from surveys and air photos by the Japanese Antarctic Research Expedition, 1957–62, and named for its proximity to the Langhovde Hills.

== See also ==
- List of glaciers in the Antarctic
- Glaciology
