= Bentenjima =

Bentenjima or Bentenshima may refer to:

- Bentenjima Station, Japanese railway station on the Tokaido link
- Benten-jima (Wakkanai), deserted island, the northernmost point under Japanese control
- Bentenjima, at the center of Shinobazu Pond in Ueno Park in Tokyo
- Bentenjima, multiple islands: See List of islands of Japan

== See also ==
- Benten Island, English version of name
