= Breidvågnipa Peak =

Mountain in Queen Maud Land, Antarctica

Breidvågnipa Peak (69°21′S 39°48′E) is a peak, 325 metres (1,066 ft) high, rising 0.5 nautical miles (1 km) southeast of Mount Hiroe on the coast of Queen Maud Land, Antarctica. It was mapped by Norwegian cartographers from air photos taken by the Lars Christensen Expedition, 1936–37, and named "Breidvågnipa" (the "broad bay peak") in association with nearby Breidvåg Bight.
