= Ungane Islands =

Island in Antarctica

The Ungane Islands (69°16′S 39°29′E) are an archipelago of three small islands lying 4 miles (6 km) west-northwest of Hamnenabben Head in the east part of Lutzow-Holm Bay. They were first mapped by Norwegian cartographers from air photos taken by the Lars Christensen Expedition, 1936–37, and named Ungane (the young ones).

== See also ==
- List of antarctic and sub-antarctic islands
