= Revsnes =

Revsnes may refer to:

== Places ==
- Revsnes Island, an island off the coast of Antarctica
- Revsnes, Troms, a village in Kvæfjord municipality in Troms county, Norway
- Revsnes, Trøndelag, a village in Åfjord municipality in Trøndelag county, Norway
- Revsnes, an old spelling of the village of Räfsnäs in Uppland, Sweden

== See also ==
- Algot Magnuson of Revsnes, a medieval Swedish noble
