= Azuki (disambiguation) =

Azuki may refer to:

- Adzuki bean
  - Red bean paste
- Azuki Island
- Azuki (manga publisher)

== People with the surname ==
- Nana Azuki, Japanese musical lyricist
- Yu Azuki, author of Igano Kabamaru

== Characters with the name ==
- Miho Azuki, a character in the manga series Bakuman
- Azuki Rousai, a character in the novel The Kouga Ninja Scrolls
- Azuki-chan (Azusa Noyama), in the anime series Azuki-chan
- Azuki Shinatsu, in the manga series Maken-ki!
- Azuki Minaduki, in the adult visual novel series Nekopara
