= Revsnes Island =

Island in Antarctica

- Location within Antarctica
- Etymology: Norwegian for "fox's nose"

Geography
- Location: Lutzow-Holm Bay, Prince Harald Coast, Queen Maud Land
- Coordinates: 69°17′S 39°37′E

Revsnes Island (69°17′S 39°37′E) is a distinctive forked island with two branches, lying just off Hamnenabben Head in the east part of Lutzow-Holm Bay. Mapped by Norwegian cartographers from air photos taken by the Lars Christensen Expedition, 1936–37, and named Revsnes (fox's nose) because of its shape.

== See also ==
- List of antarctic and sub-antarctic islands
