= Mitsudomoe Islands =

Island in Antarctica

- Location within Antarctica

Geography
- Location: Antarctica
- Coordinates: 69°57′S 38°45′E

Administration
- Administered under the Antarctic Treaty System

Demographics
- Population: Uninhabited

The Mitsudomoe Islands are three small islands lying close together 2 kilometres (1 nmi) west of Strandnebba in the southeastern extremity of Lützow-Holm Bay, Antarctica. They were mapped from surveys and air photos by the Japanese Antarctic Research Expedition, 1957–62, and named "Mitsudomoe-shima" (commas-united-to-form-a-circle islands).

== See also ==
- List of antarctic and sub-antarctic islands
