= Djupvika =

Djupvika may refer to:

- Djupvika Bay, Antarctica
- Djupvika Beach, Norway
