= Telen Glacier =

Glacier in Antarctica

- Location of Queen Maud Land in Antarctica

- Location within Antarctica
- Location: Queen Maud Land
- Coordinates: 68°38′S 39°42′E
- Thickness: unknown
- Lowest elevation: Lützow-Holm Bay
- Status: unknown

Telen Glacier (69°38′S 39°42′E) is a glacier flowing to the east side of Lutzow-Holm Bay between Telen Hill and Kjuka Headland. Mapped from air photos and surveys by Japanese Antarctic Research Expedition (JARE), 1957–62, and named after nearby Telen Hill.

== See also ==
- List of glaciers in the Antarctic
- Glaciology
