= Nabbøya =

Island in Antarctica

- Location within Antarctica

Geography
- Location: Antarctica
- Coordinates: 69°16′S 39°35′E

Administration
- Administered under the Antarctic Treaty System

Demographics
- Population: Uninhabited

Nabbøya is a high, small, bare rock island lying 1.9 kilometres (1 nmi) west of Hamnenabben Head in the east part of Lutzow-Holm Bay. Mapped by Norwegian cartographers from air photos taken by the Lars Christensen Expedition, 1936–37, and named Nabbøya (the peg island).
