= Nesholmen Island =

Island in Antarctica

- Location within Antarctica

Geography
- Location: Antarctica
- Coordinates: 69°44′S 38°12′E

Administration
- Administered under the Antarctic Treaty System

Demographics
- Population: Uninhabited

Nesholmen Island is a small island lying 0.93 kilometres (0.5 nmi) off Djupvikneset Peninsula in southern Lützow-Holm Bay. Mapped by Norwegian cartographers from air photos taken by the Lars Christensen Expedition, 1936–37, and named Nesholmen (the ness islet) because of its proximity to Djupvikneset Peninsula.

== See also ==
- List of antarctic and sub-antarctic islands
