= Kakure Rocks =

Rock formations in Antarctica

The Kakure Rocks (67°57′S 44°47′E) are two rocky exposures along the east wall of Shinnan Glacier, at the western extremity of Enderby Land, Antarctica. They were mapped from surveys and air photos by the Japanese Antarctic Research Expedition, 1957–62, and named Kakure-iwa (hidden rocks).
