= Benten Island =

Island in Antarctica

- Location within Antarctica

Geography
- Location: Antarctica
- Coordinates: 69°1′S 39°13′E

Administration
- Administered under the Antarctic Treaty System

Demographics
- Population: Uninhabited

Benten Island is a small island lying 9 kilometres (5 nmi) west of Ongulkalven Island in the eastern part of Lutzow-Holm Bay. It was mapped from surveys and from air photos by the Japanese Antarctic Research Expedition, 1957–62, and named "Benten-shima" ("goddess of fortune island").

== See also ==
- List of antarctic and sub-antarctic islands
