= Indrehovdeholmen =

Island in Antarctica

- Location within Antarctica

Geography
- Location: Antarctica
- Coordinates: 69°11′S 39°33′E

Administration
- Administered under the Antarctic Treaty System

Demographics
- Population: Uninhabited

Indrehovdeholmen is an island lying 2.8 kilometres (1.5 nmi) west of Langhovde-kita Point in the eastern part of Lützow-Holm Bay, Antarctica. It was mapped by Norwegian cartographers from air photos taken by the Lars Christensen Expedition, 1936–37, and named "Indrehovdeholmen" (the inner knoll island) because of its position among the islands adjacent to the Langhovde Hills.
