= Botnnuten =

Mountain in Queen Maud Land, Antarctica

Botnnuten (70°24′S 38°1′E) is an isolated rock peak, 1,460 metres (4,790 ft) high, located south of Havsbotn and 22 nautical miles (40 km) southwest of Shirase Glacier in Queen Maud Land. It was mapped by Norwegian cartographers from air photos taken by the Lars Christensen Expedition, 1936–37, and named Botnnuten (the bottom peak), presumably in association with Havsbotn and because it is the furthest south peak in the immediate vicinity.
