= Hjart Island =

Island in Antarctica

- Location within Antarctica

Geography
- Location: Antarctica
- Coordinates: 69°38′S 39°16′E

Administration
- Administered under the Antarctic Treaty System

Demographics
- Population: Uninhabited

Hjart Island is an island lying 4 kilometres (2 nmi) west of the Skallen Hills in the eastern part of Lützow-Holm Bay, Antarctica. It was mapped by Norwegian cartographers from air photos taken by the Lars Christensen Expedition, 1936–37, and named Hjartoy (heart island) because of its shape.

== See also ==
- List of antarctic and sub-antarctic islands
