= Sigaren Islands =

Islands in Antarctica

The Sigaren Islands (69°10′S 39°28′E) are two islands lying in the east part of Lutzow-Holm Bay, 3.5 miles (6 km) west of Langhovde-kita Point. The islands were mapped by Norwegian cartographers from air photos taken by the Lars Christensen Expedition, 1936–37, and named Sigaren (the cigar) because of their shape.

== See also ==
- List of antarctic and sub-antarctic islands
