= Riiser-Larsen Ice Shelf =

Ice shelf of Antarctica

Coordinates: 72°40′S 16°0′W

Location of Riiser-Larsen Ice Shelf in Queen Maud Land
Antarctica

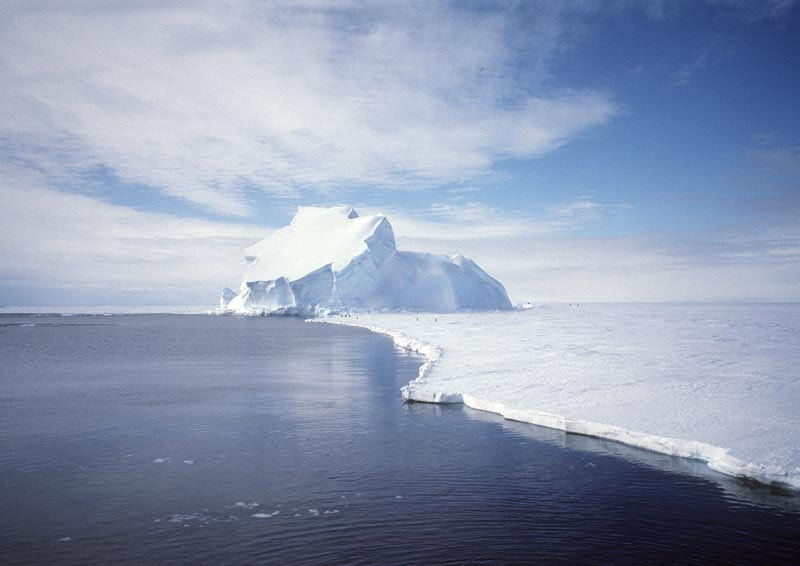
View of the Riiser-Larsen Ice Shelf

Riiser-Larsen Ice Shelf is an ice shelf about 250 miles (400 km) long on the coast of Queen Maud Land, Antarctica, extending from Cape Norvegia in the north to Lyddan Island and Stancomb-Wills Glacier in the south.

== Discovery and naming ==
Parts of the ice shelf were sighted by William Speirs Bruce in 1904, Ernest Shackleton in 1915, and Hjalmar Riiser-Larsen in 1930. Most of it was photographed from the air in 1951-52 by the Norwegian-British-Swedish Antarctic Expedition (NBSAE) and delineated from these photos. Additional delineation of the southern and landward margins of the feature was accomplished from aerial photos taken, by the USN's Operation Deep Freeze from 1967 to 1969. The feature was named by Norway for Captain Hjalmar Riiser-Larsen, who explored the area in the late 1920s and early 1930s.

== Important Bird Area ==
A 477 ha site on fast ice, on the northern coast of the ice shelf some 90 km south-west of Seal Bay and 140 km north-east of Cape Vestkapp, has been designated an Important Bird Area (IBA) by BirdLife International because it supports a breeding colony of about 4,000 emperor penguins, estimated from 2009 satellite imagery.

== See also ==
- Cape Vestkapp
