= Byvågåsane Peaks =

Mountain in Antarctica

The Byvågåsane Peaks (69°25′S 39°48′E) are three low aligned rock peaks which surmount the east shore of Byvågen Bay on the east side of Lutzow-Holm Bay. They were mapped by Norwegian cartographers from air photos taken by the Lars Christensen Expedition, 1936–37 and named Byvågåsane (the town bay peaks) in association with Byvågen Bay.

Bōzu Peak (69°25′S 39°47′E) is the central and, at 235 metres (770 ft), the highest of the Byvagasane Peaks. It was surveyed by the Japanese Antarctic Research Expedition, 1957–62, and named Bōzu-san (treeless peak).

Tankobu Peak (69°24′S 39°48′E) is a bare rock peak, 155 metres (510 ft) high, marking the north end of the Byvagasane Peaks. It was surveyed by JARE and named Tankobu-san (craggy peak).
