= Lützow-Holm Bay =

Bay in Antarctica

Coordinates: 69°10′S 37°30′E

Location of Lützow-Holm Bay in Queen Maud Land, Antarctica

Lützow-Holm Bay is a large bay, about 220 kilometres (120 nmi) wide, indenting the coast of Queen Maud Land in Antarctica between Riiser-Larsen Peninsula and the coastal angle immediately east of the Flatvaer Islands. It was discovered by Captain Hjalmar Riiser-Larsen in two airplane flights from his expedition vessel, the Norvegia, on February 21 and 23, 1931. The name honours Commander Finn Lützow-Holm of the Royal Norwegian Navy Air Service, a pilot for Captain Riiser-Larsen on the Aagaard in 1935.

== Named features ==
Several features in and around Lützow-Holm Bay have been charted and named by various expeditions and survey groups, particularly a number of smaller bays indenting its shores. Unless otherwise specified, the following features were mapped and given Norwegian language names by Norwegian cartographers from air photos taken by the Lars Christensen Expedition (LCE) of 1936–37. Many other features were given Japanese language names by personnel from Japanese Antarctic Research Expedition headquarters, following the JARE expeditions of 1957–62.

=== West shore ===
The Riiser-Larsen Peninsula is a large rocky peninsula forming the western portal to Lützow-Holm Bay. It also marks the separation of the Princess Ragnhild Coast from the Prince Harald Coast, which encompasses the entire bay, ending at its east entrance. The peninsula was named after Captain Hjalmar Riiser-Larsen, who discovered the peninsula in a flight from the Norvegia on February 21, 1931. JARE applied names to two large rocks and a point on the peninsula: Kita-karamete Rock ("north back gate rock"), Minami-karamete Rock ("south back gate rock"), and Karamete Point ("back gate point").

Fletta Bay ("the braid") is a smaller bay which indents the southwest shore of Lützow-Holm Bay. Nearby Innhovde Point ("inner knoll") is a lone bare rock point within it. On the east side of the bay stands Såta Nunatak ("the haystack"), with Kista Nunatak just 0.5 nautical miles (0.93 km) south.

Southeast of Fletta is ice-covered Botnneset Peninsula ("bottom promontory"). Its rocky western portion is called the Vesthovde Headland ("west knoll"), and its elevated eastern portion is called Austhovde Headland ("east hillock"). At the base of Botnneset Peninsula are two exposed rocks called the Kattaugo Rocks ("cat's eyes"). At the centre of the peninsula is an isolated nunatak, Veslestabben Nunatak ("little stump").

Djupvika ("deep bay") deeply indents the western shore between Botnneset and, to the east, Djupvika Point and Djupvikneset Peninsula. The rocky Berrnabbane Crags ("bare crags") line its southeast side. High, ice-covered Djupvikneset Peninsula ("deep-bay ness") is named in association with the bay. On its north side are the four Yotsume Rocks ("rock with four eyes"), named by JARE.

=== Southern shore ===
The narrow southernmost portion of Lützow-Holm Bay is another smaller bay, called Havsbotn, meaning "sea bottom". South of the head of Havsbotn is a rock summit, Botnnuten. On the eastern shore of Havsbotn, the Ystekleppane Rocks ("outermost lumps") protrude through the ice. Shirase Glacier enters the bay at this point. Along the east side of Havsbotn is Insteodden Point ("innermost point").

A low series of bare rock hills called Strandnebba, "the shore beak," extends along the south shore of Lützow-Holm Bay for 1.5 mi (2.4 km). One nautical mile (1.9 km) northeast stands Vesleknausen Rock ("tiny crag"), 110 metres (360 ft) high. 3 nautical miles (5.6 km) northeast, a headland called Rundvågs Head stands 160 metres (520 ft) high, marking the southwest margin of Rundvåg Bay. Rundvåg Bay is a rounded embayment, the south part of which is occupied by a glacier tongue. On the east side of the bay are the Rundvågs Hills, a group of bare rock hills. Both the Hills and the Head are named for their association to the Rundvåg Bay, Rundvåg meaning "round bay". A bare rock headland called Berr Point ("bare point") sits 4 nmi (7.4 km) northeast of the hills.

The next major group of features begins with Sudare Rock, a coastal rock whose name, meaning "bamboo blinds rock", was issued by JARE. To the east is Skallevik Point, which marks the northwest end of the Skallevikhalsen Hills, a line of bare rock hills that fringe the southeast shore of Lützow-Holm Bay for 4 nmi (7.4 km). Just east lies Skallevika, a small bay. Continuing east, Kado Point, named "corner point" by JARE, marks the western extremity of the Skallen Hills, an area of bare rock coastal hills. On the northeast side of the hills is Oshiage Beach ("raised beach"), named by JARE. East of the Skallen Hills, Magoke Point, named by JARE, projects into an inlet separating the hills from Skallen Glacier, which flows into the bay. Skallen Hills was presumably named by LCE personnel because the outline of the feature on a Norwegian map was suggestive of a skull. These remainder of the nearby features were all named descriptively in association with the hills, such as Skallevika, meaning "skull bay", and Skallevikhalsen, meaning "skull bay neck".

=== East shore ===
On Lützow-Holm Bay's east coast, the bare rocky hill Telen Hill ("frozen crust") stands between Skallen Glacier and Telen Glacier. Kjukevåg Bay indents the coast between the seaward projection of Telen Glacier and the coast just northward, Kjuka Headland ("the lump"), which stands 300 metres (1,000 ft) high. Trilling Bay ("triplet bay") sits just north of this.

The extensive Skarvsnes Foreland, surmounted by bare rock peaks and indented by several coves, protrudes into the east part of the bay north of Trilling Bay. The Honnør Glacier flows into the sea east of it, north of the Byvågåsane Peaks.

North of that, still on the east shore, a small bight called Breidvåg Bight ("broad bay") indents the coast just west of Breidvågnipa Peak. Its north point, just southwest of Mount Hiroe, is called Hiroe Point ("broad bay point"). Continuing north, a bare rock headland called Hamnenabben Head ("harbor crag") marks the south shore of Hamna Bay, with the Systerflesene Islands to the west in the water. Immediately east of Hamnenabben Head, Hamna Icefall descends to the south end of Hamna Bay. The icefall was named by JARE in association with Hamna Bay.

Continuing east, the next major feature is the Langhovde Hills, bordered on the west by Hamna Bay and the east by Hovde Bay. The Langhovde Glacier flows north from the east side of the hills into Hovde Bay.

=== Islands ===
Islands and island groups within Lützow-Holm Bay:

- Azuki Island
- Benten Island
- East Ongul Island
- Einstødingen Island
- Flatvaer Islands
- Flein Island
- Hjart Island
- Indrehovdeholmen
- Kaname Island
- Minamo Island
- Mitsudomoe Islands
- Nabbøya
- Nesholmen Island
- Nøkkelholmane Islands
- Oyayubi Island
- Padda Island
- Revsnes Island
- Rumpa Island
- Sigaren Islands
- Systerflesene Islands
- Trilling Islands
- Ungane Islands
- Ytrehovdeholmen Island
