= Cape Norvegia =

Cape on Queen Maud Land, Antarctica

Coordinates: 71°20′S 12°18′W

Cape Norvegia is a prominent cape on Princess Martha Coast of Queen Maud Land. It marks the northeast extremity of Riiser-Larsen Ice Shelf in East Antarctica, and the border point of Weddell Sea and King Haakon VII Sea. It was discovered by Commander Hjalmar Riiser-Larsen in February 1930 while on an airplane flight from the Norvegia, the ship in which the expedition was made. The cape was named by Riiser-Larsen for the ship.
