= Inger Dag Steen =

Norwegian politician and textile artist (1933–2019)

- Born: Inger Dag; 22 March 1933; Kristiansand, Norway
- Died: 22 November 2019 (aged 86)
- Occupation: Politician
- Political party: Socialist Left Party
- Spouse: Knut Steen (m. 1957)

Inger Dag Steen (née Inger Dag; 22 March 1933 – 22 November 2019) was a Norwegian textile artist and politician for the Socialist Left Party.

== Biography ==
Steen was born in Kristiansand on 22 March 1933 to architect Ragnar Dag and Dagny Fosby. She married sculptor Knut Steen in 1957.

She was elected representative to the Storting from the constituency of Vestfold for the period 1989–1993.

On the local level she was a member of the municipal council of Sandefjord Municipality from 1967 to 1989 and 2003 to 2007, and Vestfold county council from 1983 to 1989. She chaired Sandefjord Socialist Left Party from 1975 to 1978 and 1993 to 1994, and was deputy chair of Vestfold Socialist Left Party from 1994 to 1999.

She died on 22 November 2019.
