= Azuki Island =

Small island in Antarctica

- Location within Antarctica

Geography
- Location: Antarctica
- Coordinates: 69°53′S 38°56′E

Administration
- Administered under the Antarctic Treaty System

Demographics
- Population: Uninhabited

Azuki Island is a small island in Antarctica 2 kilometres (1 nmi) west of Rundvågs Head in the southeast part of Lutzow-Holm Bay. It was mapped from surveys and from air photos by the Japanese Antarctic Research Expedition (JARE), 1957–1962, and named "Azuki-shima" ("azuki bean island").

== See also ==
- List of antarctic and sub-antarctic islands
