= Padda Island =

Island in Antarctica

- Location within Antarctica

Geography
- Location: Antarctica
- Coordinates: 69°39′S 38°20′E

Administration
- Administered under the Antarctic Treaty System

Demographics
- Population: Uninhabited

Padda Island is an island lying near the west side of the entrance to Havsbotn in Lutzow-Holm Bay. The island and its named features were mapped by Norwegian cartographers from air photos taken by the Lars Christensen Expedition, 1936–37. The island was named Padda (the toad) because of its shape.

The headland Austpynten, meaning "east point," forms the entire northeastern extremity of the island. Kujira Point is the northernmost extremity of Padda Island. It remapped by the Japanese Antarctic Research Expedition (JARE) of 1957–62, and named Kujira-misaki, meaning "whale point". Nordbukta, meaning "north bay," is on the north side of the island.

Ice-covered Nagagutsu Point forms the southeast extremity of Padda Island. It was remapped by JARE and named Nagagutsu-misaki (boot point).

== See also ==
- List of antarctic and sub-antarctic islands
