= Temmondai Rock =

Rock exposure on the coast of Queen Maud Land

Temmondai Rock (68°25′S 41°41′E) is a rock exposure on the coast at the east side of the terminus of Higashi-naga-iwa Glacier in Queen Maud Land. Mapped from surveys and air photos by Japanese Antarctic Research Expedition (JARE), 1957–62, and named Temmondai-iwa (astronomical observatory rock).
