= Winterstoke sun shelter and rock gardens =

Coordinates: 51°20′20″N 1°25′58″E

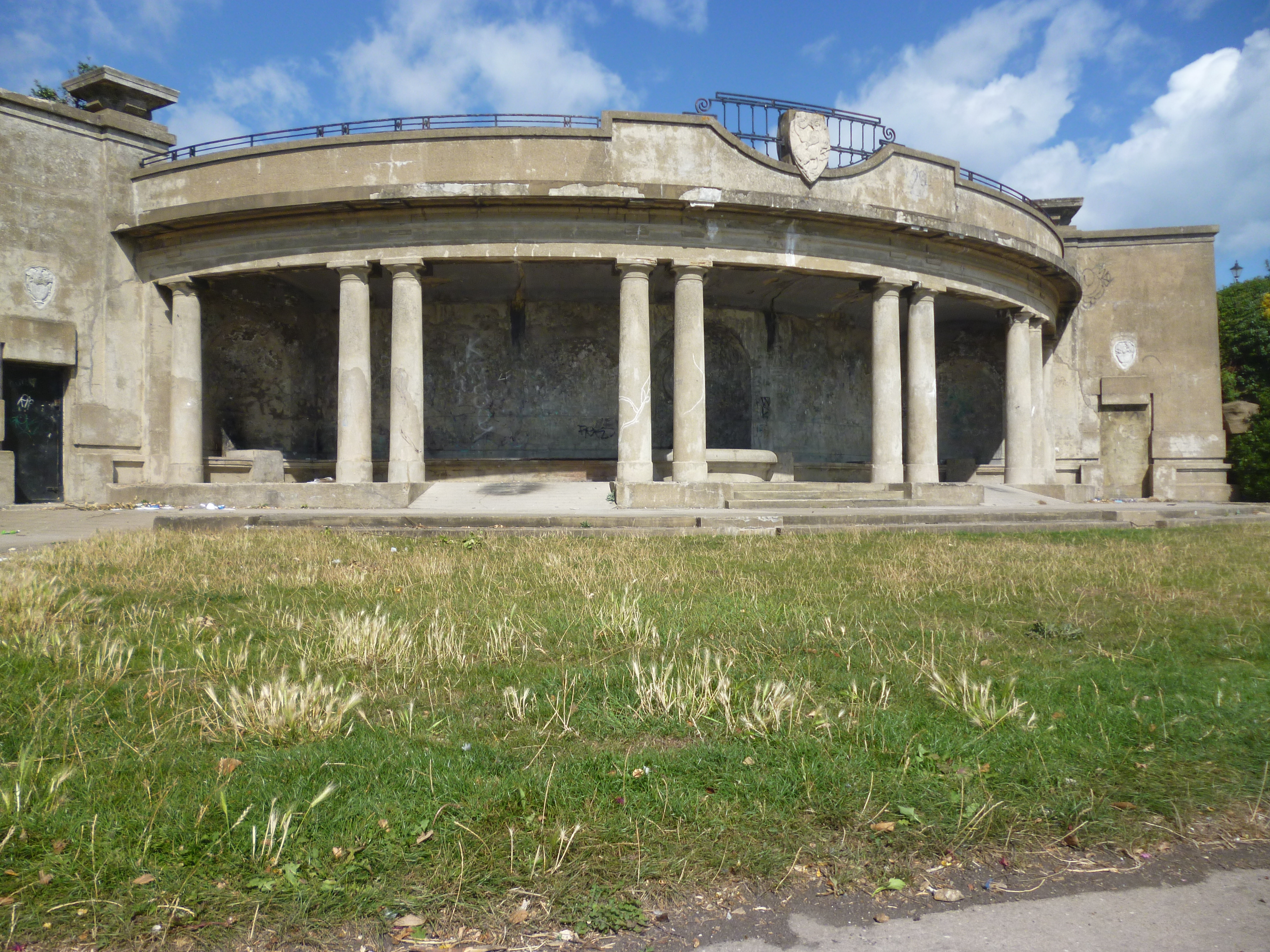
Winterstoke sun shelter in 2013.

The Winterstoke sun shelter and rock gardens are located on Victoria Parade, Ramsgate, Kent, United Kingdom.

Overlooking the sea, the ornamental gardens were laid out and presented to the Borough of Ramsgate by Dame Janet Stancomb-Wills in 1920 and opened to the public in June 1923 by the Mayor of Ramsgate (Alderman A. W. Larkin). They are maintained by Thanet District Council and were Grade II listed on 4 February 1988. The site is listed on the Ramsgate Society's Buildings at risk register.

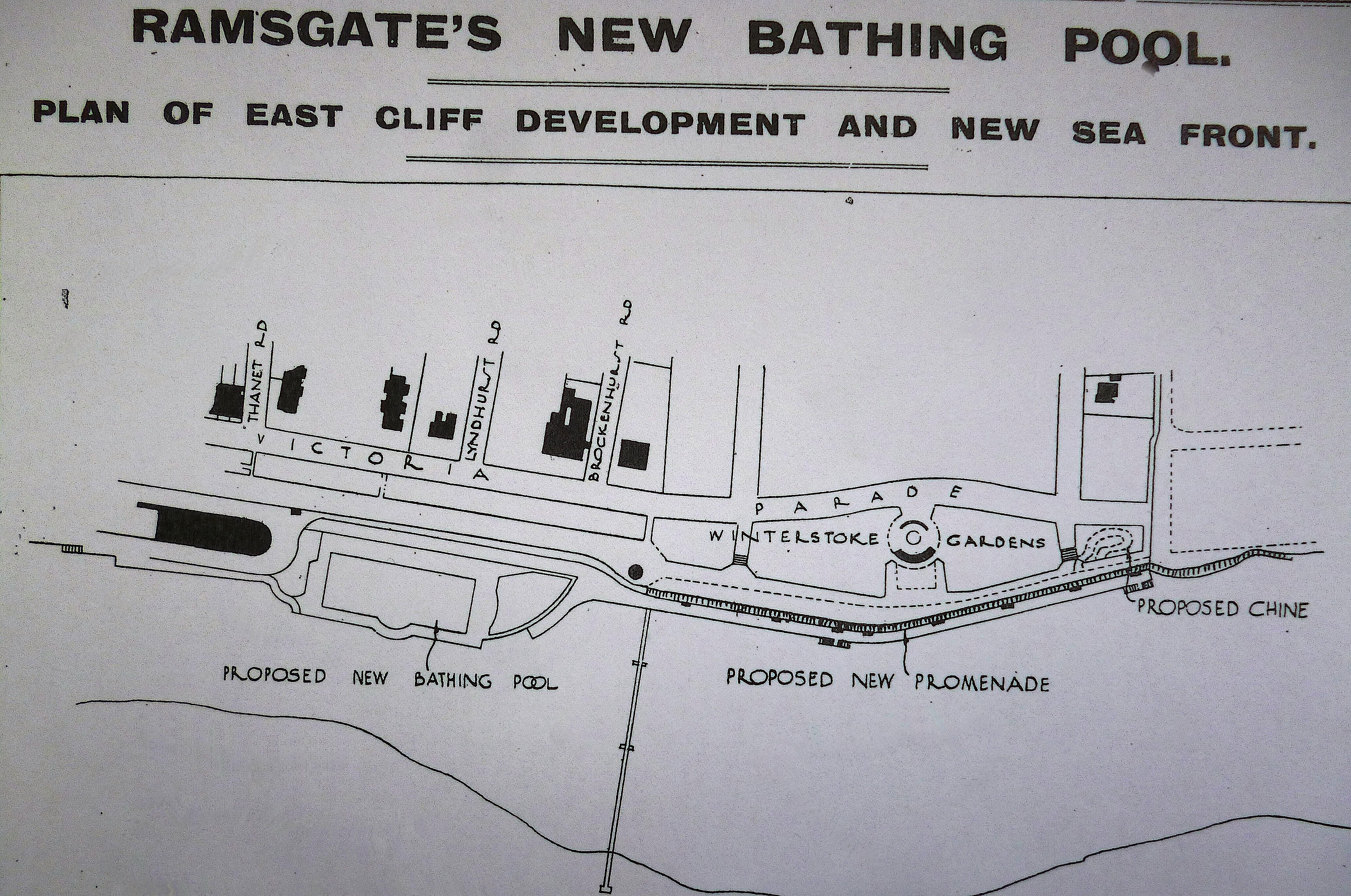
A map of Ramsgate's East Cliff, showing the location of the Winterstoke Gardens in relation to later proposed developments in the area. The East Kent Times, 2 January 1935

The gardens were designed by the architects Sir John Burnet & Partners, and constructed by Pulham and Son. The main feature of the gardens, is a semi-circular shaped colonnade carved into the pulhamite recess. Inside the shelter, and now lost, were two pieces of sculpture work by Mr. Gilbert Bayes. They represented children playing with the "Ram" of Ramsgate.

On the upper terrace, approached by broad flights of steps, the gardens proper are reached. In the centre, and immediately over the shelter, is a circular pool enclosed on the north side by a semi-circular Roman seat.
