= Cape Vestkapp =

Peninsula on the Princess Martha Coast of Antarctica

Cape Vestkapp (72°40′S 19°0′W) is a prominent westward projection of the ice front of the Antarctic continent's Riiser-Larsen Ice Shelf, located midway along the ice front and about 60 nautical miles (110 km) west of the Kraul Mountains, in the region of Queen Maud Land. It was first photographed from the air by Norwegian-British-Swedish Antarctic Expedition (NBSAE) in 1951-52 and mapped from these photos. It was named Vestkapp (meaning "west cape" in Norwegian).
