= Byōbu Rock =

- Location within Antarctica

Geography
- Location: Queen Maud Land, East Antarctica

Byōbu Rock (68°22′S 42°0′E) is a large rock whose seaward face presents a crenulate or irregular shoreline, standing 1 nautical mile (2 km) east of Gobamme Rock on the coast of Queen Maud Land. It was mapped from surveys and air photos by the Japanese Antarctic Research Expedition, 1957–62, and named Byōbu-iwa (folding screen rock).
