= Princess Ragnhild Coast =

Coast of Antarctica

Coordinates: 70°30′S 27°0′E

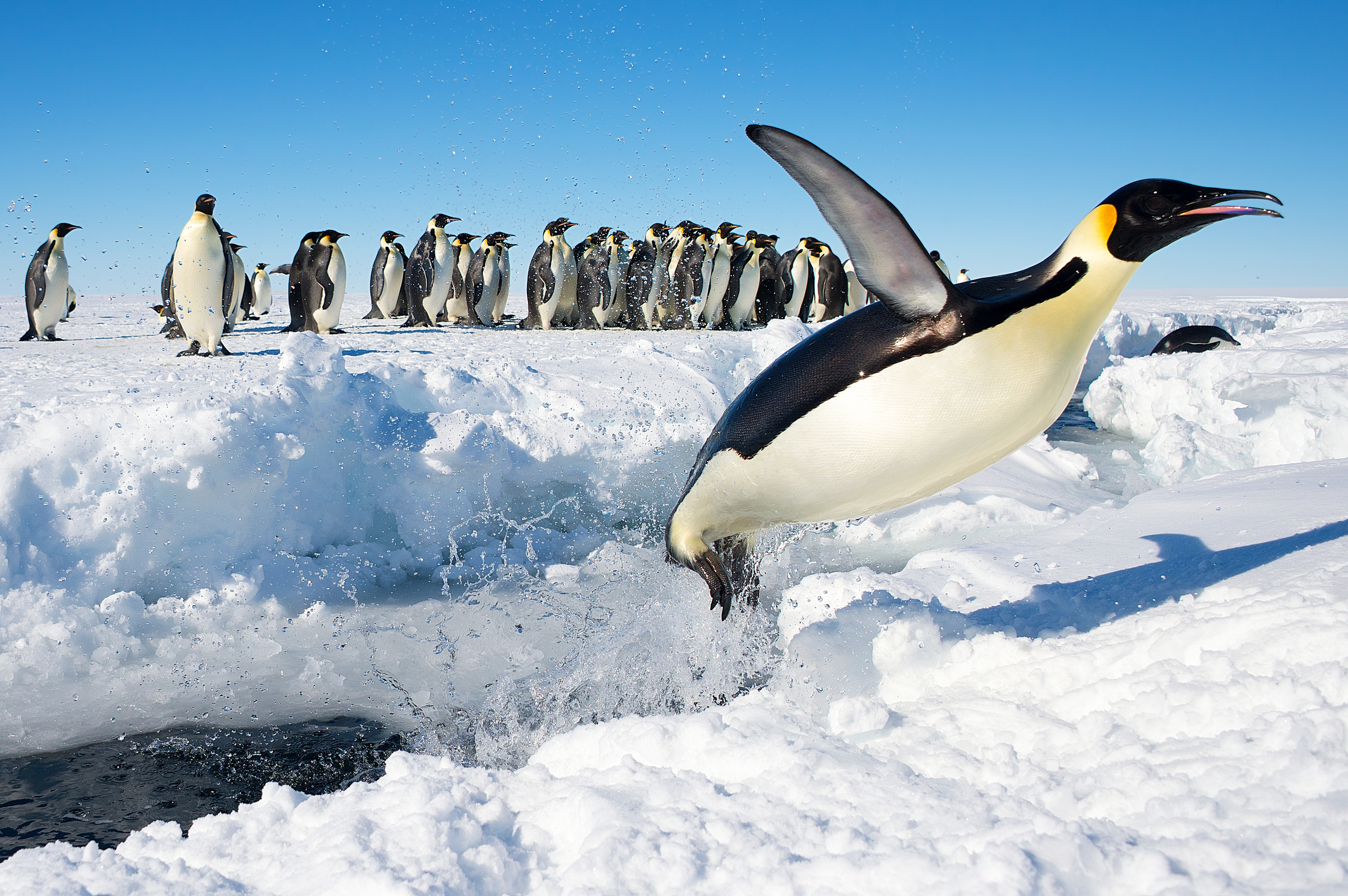
Emperor penguins breed in the IBA

Princess Ragnhild Coast (Norwegian: Prinsesse Ragnhild Kyst) is the portion of the coast of Queen Maud Land in Antarctica lying between 20° E and the Riiser-Larsen Peninsula, at 34° E. All but the eastern end of the coast is fringed by ice shelves. It was discovered by Capt. Hjalmar Riiser-Larsen and Capt. Nils Larsen in aerial flights from the ship Norvegia on February 16, 1931, and named for Princess Ragnhild of Norway. Vestvika Bay is a large bay on the west side of Riiser-Larsen Peninsula; it was mapped from air photos taken by the Lars Christensen Expedition, 1936–37, and named Vestvika, meaning "west bay."

== Important Bird Area ==
A 379 ha site on fast ice, within a crack in the ice shelf some 230 km west of the Riiser-Larsen Peninsula, has been designated an Important Bird Area (IBA) by BirdLife International because it supports a breeding colony of emperor penguins, initially discovered on 2009 satellite imagery and subsequently visited, with about 20,000 adults and chicks estimated in 2014.
