= Skarvsnes Foreland =

Foreland in Antarctica

Skarvsnes Foreland (69°28′S 39°39′E) is an extensive foreland surmounted by bare rock peaks and indented by several coves, protruding into the east part of Lutzow-Holm Bay, Antarctica. It was first mapped by Norwegian cartographers from air photos taken by the Lars Christensen Expedition (LCE) of 1936–37. Its name means "barren mountain headland." Most other features on the foreland were mapped and named by LCE personnel, with a few others mapped from surveys and air photos by Japanese Antarctic Research Expedition (JARE) of 1957–62. Unless otherwise specified, the following features were mapped and named by LCE personnel.

A number of rock peaks are situated on Skarvsnes Foreland. The bare rock summit Knappen Peak ("button peak") stands 220 metres (720 ft) high near Osen Cove at the north of the headland. Skjegget Peak ("the barb") stands 360 m (1,180 ft) high at the northwest extremity of the headland. On the south-central portion of the headland is Mount Suribachi, a conical hill named descriptively by JARE. At the foreland's southern extremity is Mount Tempyo, which stands 260 m (850 ft) high. Its name, apparently descriptive of the feature, was given by JARE Headquarters in 1973.

Narrow Torinosu Cove ("bird's nest cove") indents the west side of Skarvsnes Foreland, 1.5 nmi (2.8 km) west of Mount Suribachi. It was named by JARE in 1973. Lake-like Osen Cove, whose name means "the outlet," indents the north part of the headland. Kizahashi Beach sits at its head. Its name, meaning "stair beach", was assigned by JARE in 1972. A small island called Osøya sits in the middle of the cove. Osen Cove opens onto Byvågen Bay ("town bay"), a small bay tucked between Skarvsnes Foreland to the east and the Byvågåsane Peaks to the west. On the northwest part of the headland is Langpollen Cove ("long bay"), a long, narrow cove.
