= Prince Olav Coast =

Coast of Queen Maud Land, Antarctica

Coordinates: 68°30′S 42°30′E

Prince Olav Coast (Norwegian: Kronprins Olav Kyst) is that portion of the coast of Queen Maud Land between the east entrance point of Lützow-Holm Bay, marked by the coastal angle at 40° E, and Shinnan Glacier at 44° 38' E. It was discovered by Capt. Hjalmar Riiser-Larsen in January 1930 on a flight from the Norvegia, and named for the future King Olav V of Norway. To the west of it is the Prince Harald Coast.
