= Janet Stancomb-Wills =

British philanthropist (1853–1932)

Dame Janet Stancomb Graham Stancomb-Wills DBE PPRWA (25 January 1854 – 22 August 1932) was the first woman mayor of Ramsgate in Kent, an office which she held from 1923–24, and she was also the first person to receive, in 1922, the Freedom of the Town. She was elected President of the Royal West of England Academy (RWA) in 1911, decades before any other British Academy even admitted women as full members, and also became President of the School of Architecture at Bristol in 1921. In 1927, she was appointed Justice of the Peace for Kent. She died on 22 August 1932 at East Court, Ramsgate, Kent, aged 78.

== Biography ==
Born Janet Stancomb Graham Stancomb, she was the elder daughter of George Perkins and Catherine Janet (née Lobb) Stancomb, of Aldersgate, London, and niece of the first Baron Winterstoke (Sir W. H. Wills). With the early deaths of her father, and older brother, she and her sister, Yda Emily Margaretha Stancomb (31 January 1856 – 22 September 1936), were adopted by their mother's sister, Elisabeth, and her husband, Sir William Henry Wills. Janet and Yda officially changed their names in 1893 to respectively, Janet Stancomb Graham Stancomb-Wills and Yda Emily Margaretha Stancomb-Wills.

== Philanthropy/accomplishments ==
- Elected President of the Royal West of England Academy in 1911, the first woman to hold such a role, and more than a century before the Royal Academy in London elected its first woman President.
- In 1923, she completed the Winterstoke sun shelter and rock gardens for public use on the sea front near her home (East Court) on the East Cliff in Ramsgate
- She provided the money for a maternity ward and nurses home at the Ramsgate General Hospital. The Nurses Home in Ramsgate opened in 1927, containing 30 bedrooms and offices; she also provided the town with a motor ambulance and most up-to-date fire-fighting equipment.
- She bought land for a new elementary school in Ramsgate, which was named in her honour, the Dame Janet Community Junior School - From December 2012 has been merged with the infants school to become "Dame Janet Primary Academy".
- She helped to fund Ernest Shackleton's polar expedition. The Stancomb-Wills Glacier Tongue (75°0′S 22°0′W) is the extensive seaward projection of the Stancomb-Wills Glacier into the eastern Weddell Sea. The cliffed front of this feature was discovered in January 1915 by a British expedition led by Ernest Shackleton. He named it the Stancomb-Wills Promontory after Dame Janet, one of the principal donors of the expedition. One on the lifeboats in which Shackleton's crew escaped to Elephant island was named the 'Stancomb Wills'.

The Scott Polar Research Institute holds the Janet Stancomb-Wills collection of papers, which comprises correspondence by Dame Janet to or regarding the Antarctic explorer Sir Ernest Henry Shackleton.

== Popular culture ==
Dame Janet Stancomb-Wills was portrayed by Elizabeth Spriggs in the TV series 'Shackleton'.
