= Riiser-Larsen Peninsula =

Peninsula of Antarctica

Coordinates: 68°46′26″S 34°23′48″E

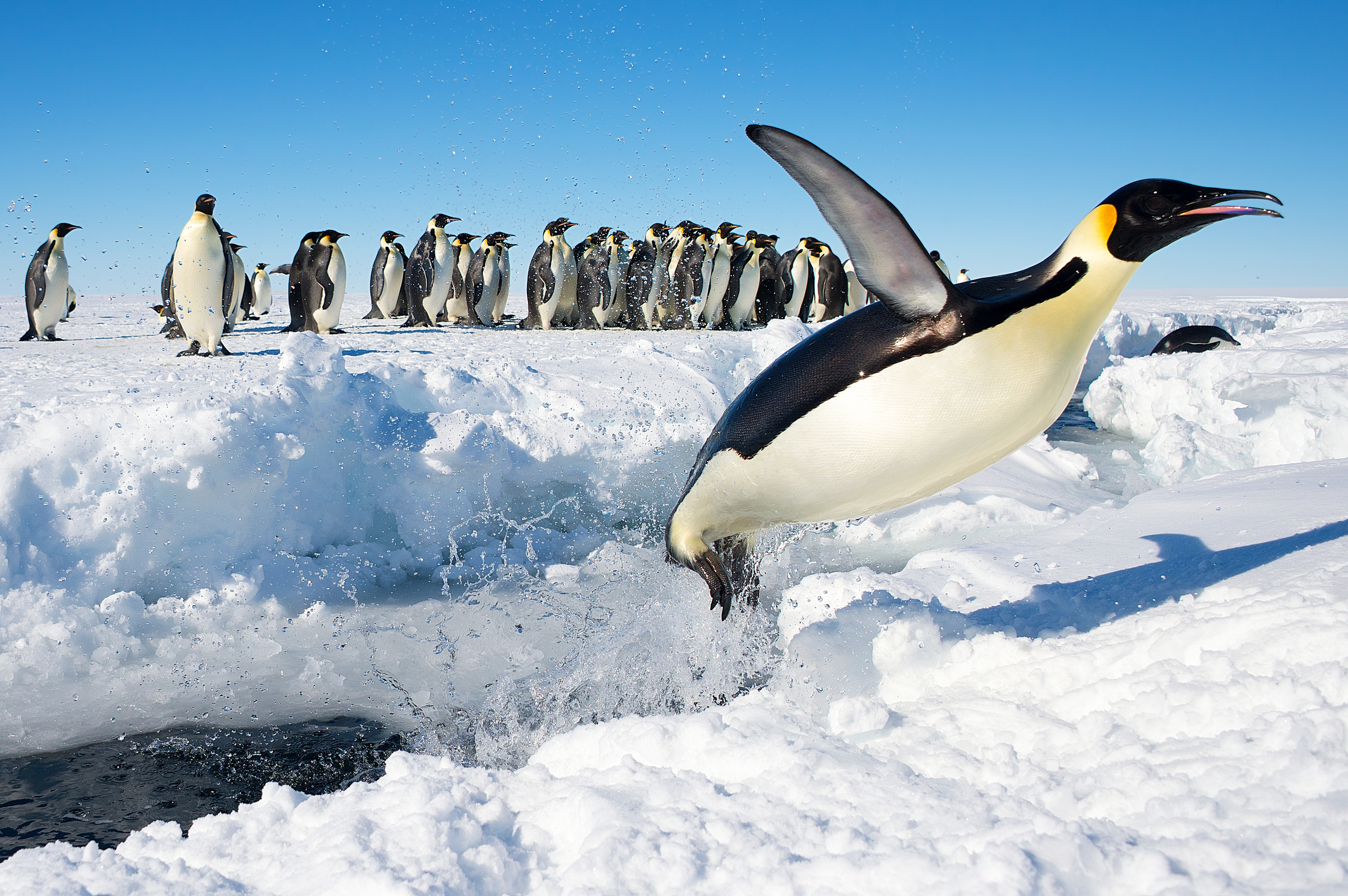
Emperor penguins breed in the IBA

Location of Riiser-Larsen Peninsula in Queen Maud Land, Antarctica

The Riiser-Larsen Peninsula (Norwegian: Riiser-Larsenhalvøya) is a large peninsula which forms the western portal to Lützow-Holm Bay and marks the separation of the Princess Ragnhild and Prince Harald Coasts. It was named after Captain Hjalmar Riiser-Larsen who discovered the peninsula in a flight from the Norvegia on 21 February 21 1931.

== Important Bird Area ==
A 1.75 square mile site on fast ice that forms in north-western Lützow-Holm Bay close to the peninsula has been designated an Important Bird Area (IBA) by BirdLife International because it supports a breeding colony of about 4,600 emperor penguins, estimated from 2009 satellite imagery.
