= Whaler's Monument =

Monument in Sandefjord, Norway

Coordinates: 59°07′39″N 10°13′32″E

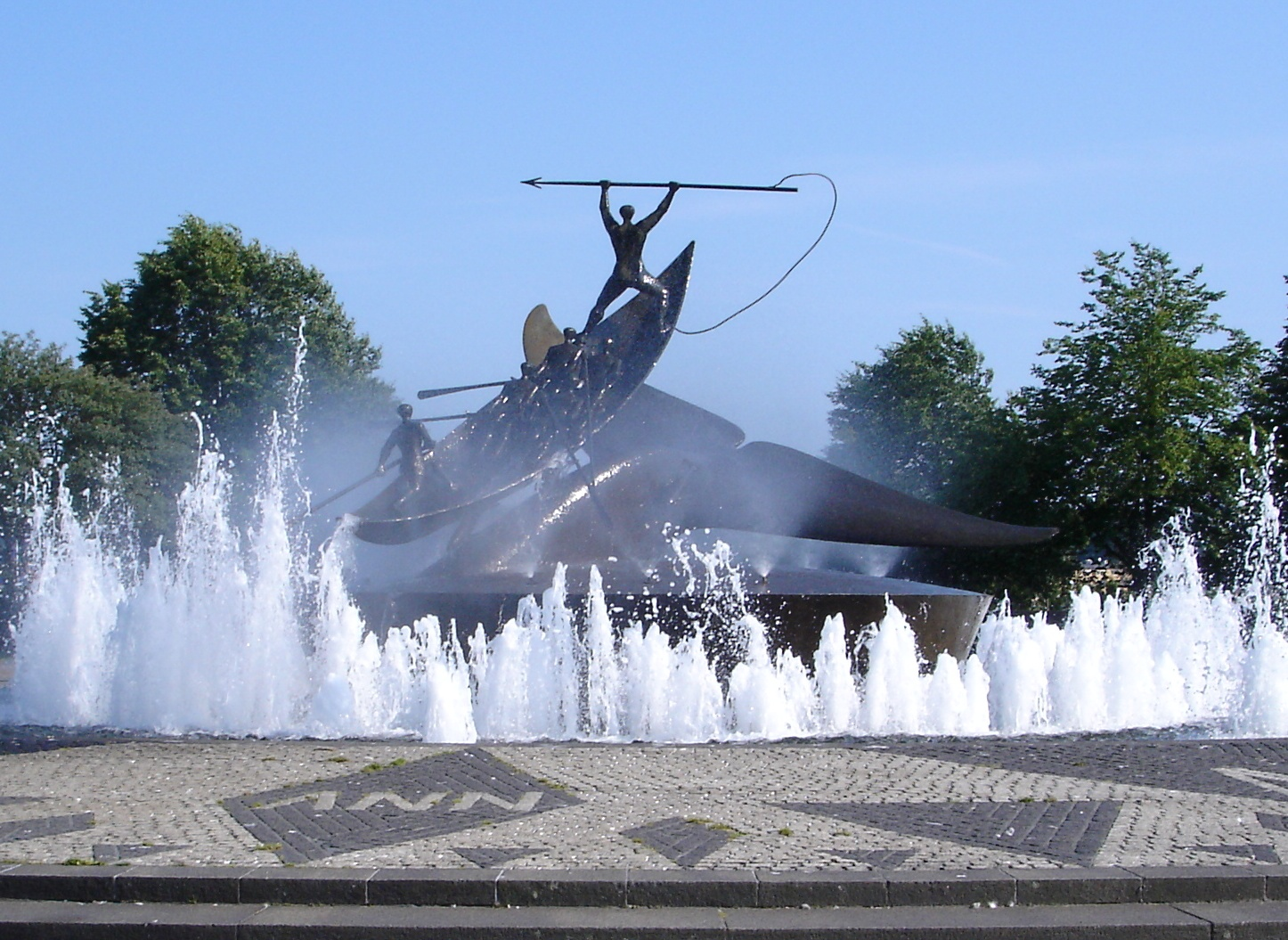
Whaler's Monument (Hvalfangstmonumentet)

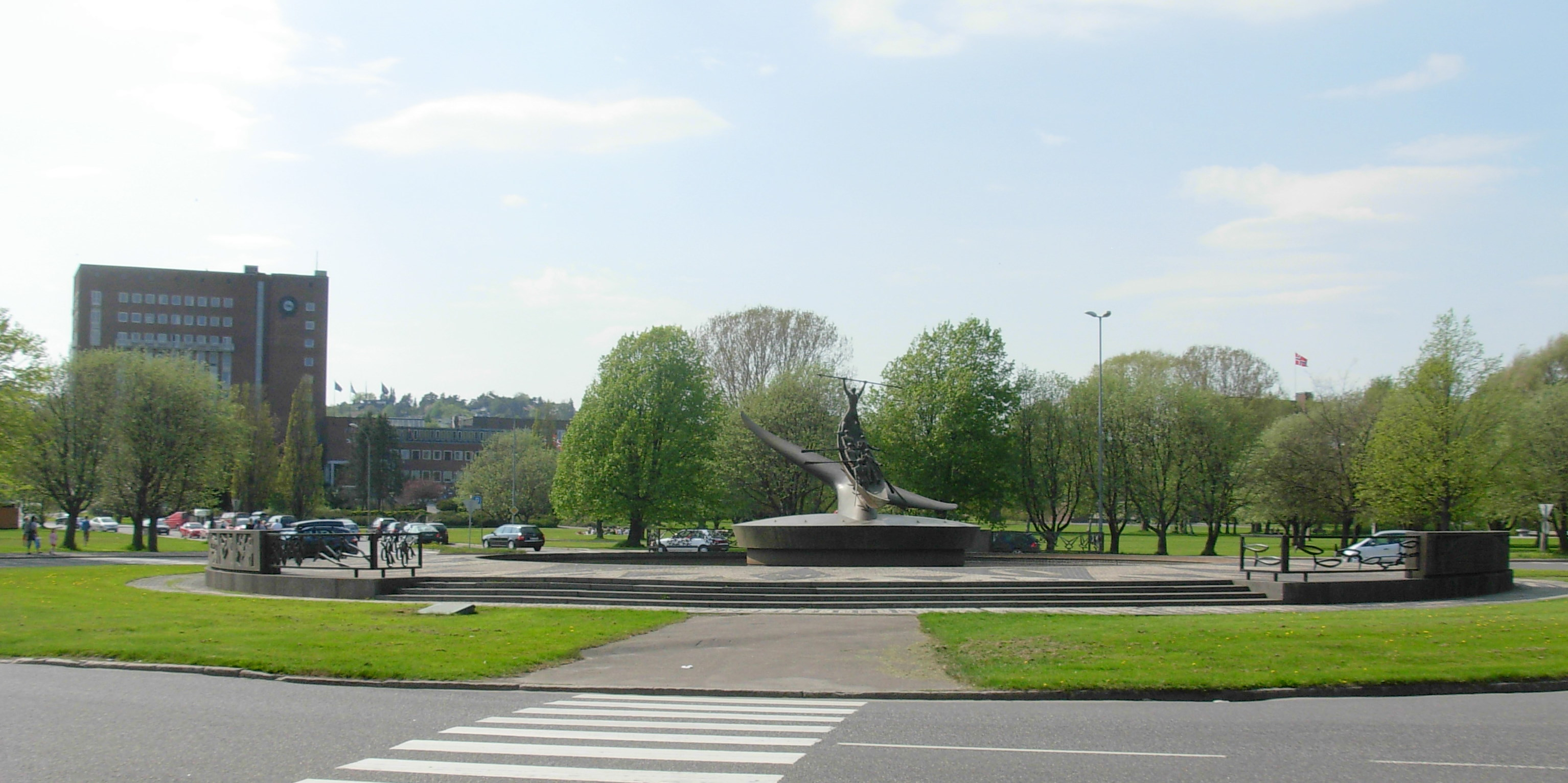
Whaler's Monument (Hvalfangstmonumentet) on Jernbanealleen. Photo taken by Helge Høifødt

Whaler's Monument, also known as The Whaling Monument (Norwegian: Hvalfangstmonumentet), is a rotating bronze memorial statue situated near the harbor in Sandefjord, Norway. It is located at the end of Jernbanealleen, the main street of the town.

The monument was sculpted by Norwegian sculptor Knut Steen, for which he won a competition more than one hundred sculptors had competed in. A commission was granted to Steen in 1953. The work took seven years to complete. It was first unveiled in 1960 and has become one of his most widely recognized works of sculpture.

It features an elegant fishing boat raised by a whale fin. It depicts four stylized figures of whalers with oars in an open boat, with harpoons ready and water spraying. It is made in the style of a compass rose and rotates slowly. Central parts are made of bronze and weighs 26 tons. The dramatic effect is enhanced by the water columns in the fountain that are regulated at different heights. The pool has 128 underwater lights. Around the fountain are stylized reliefs in granite from modern whaling.

The costs associated with the design and construction of the sculpture were donated to the city by shipowner and whaling magnateLars Christensen. Earlier, Consul Christensen had also funded the costs associated with the construction and development of the Sandefjord Museum.

== Gallery ==
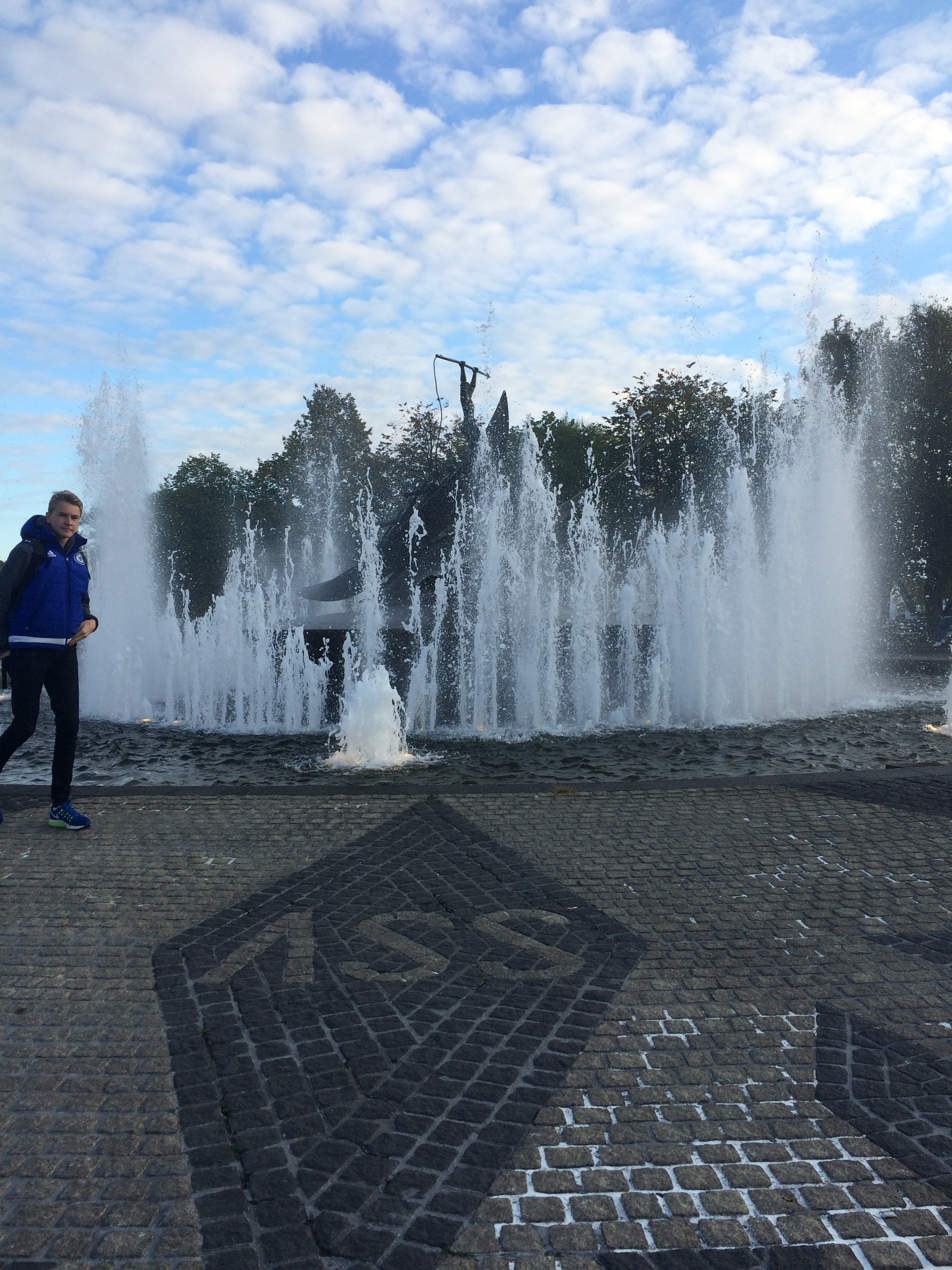

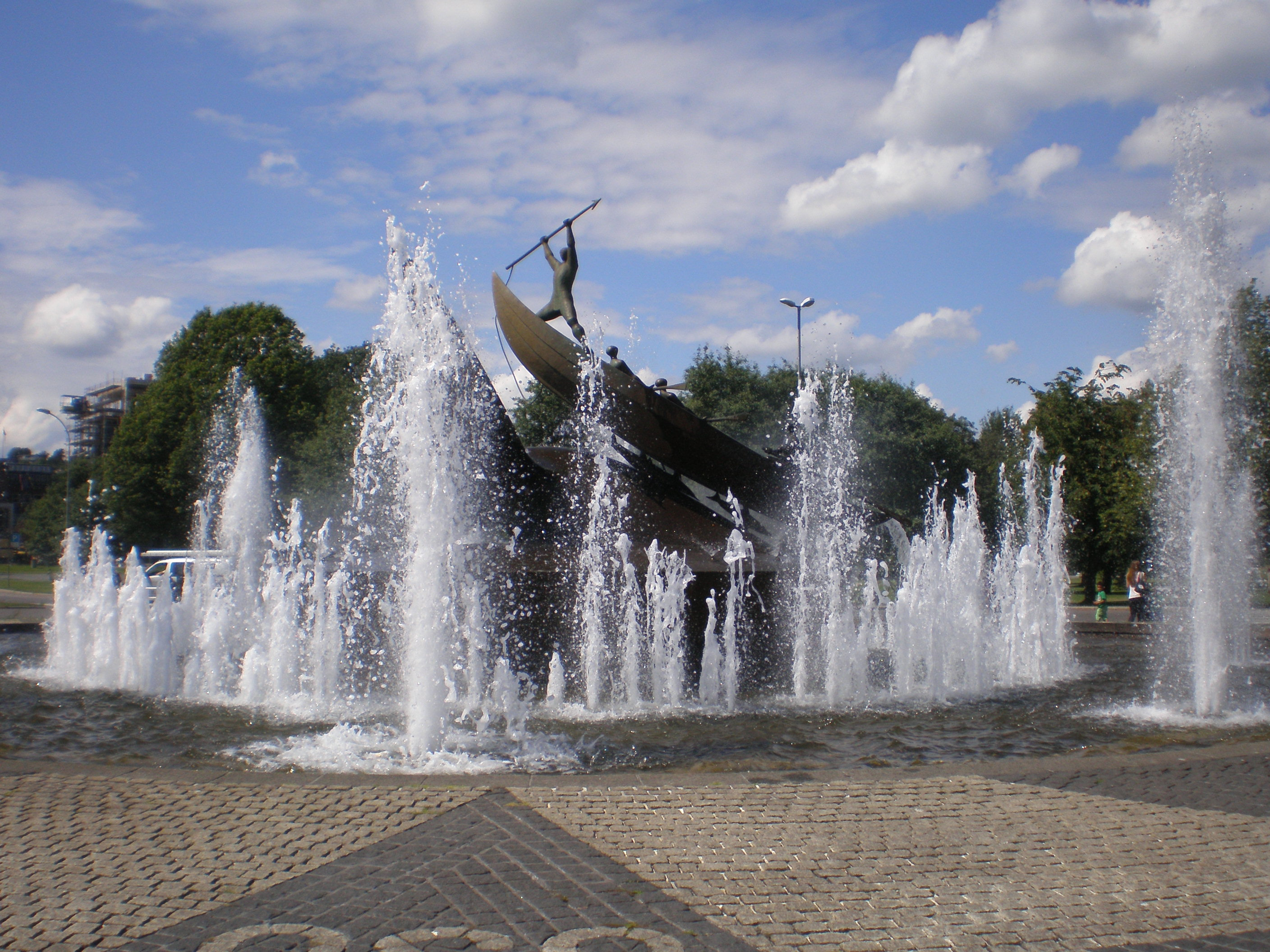

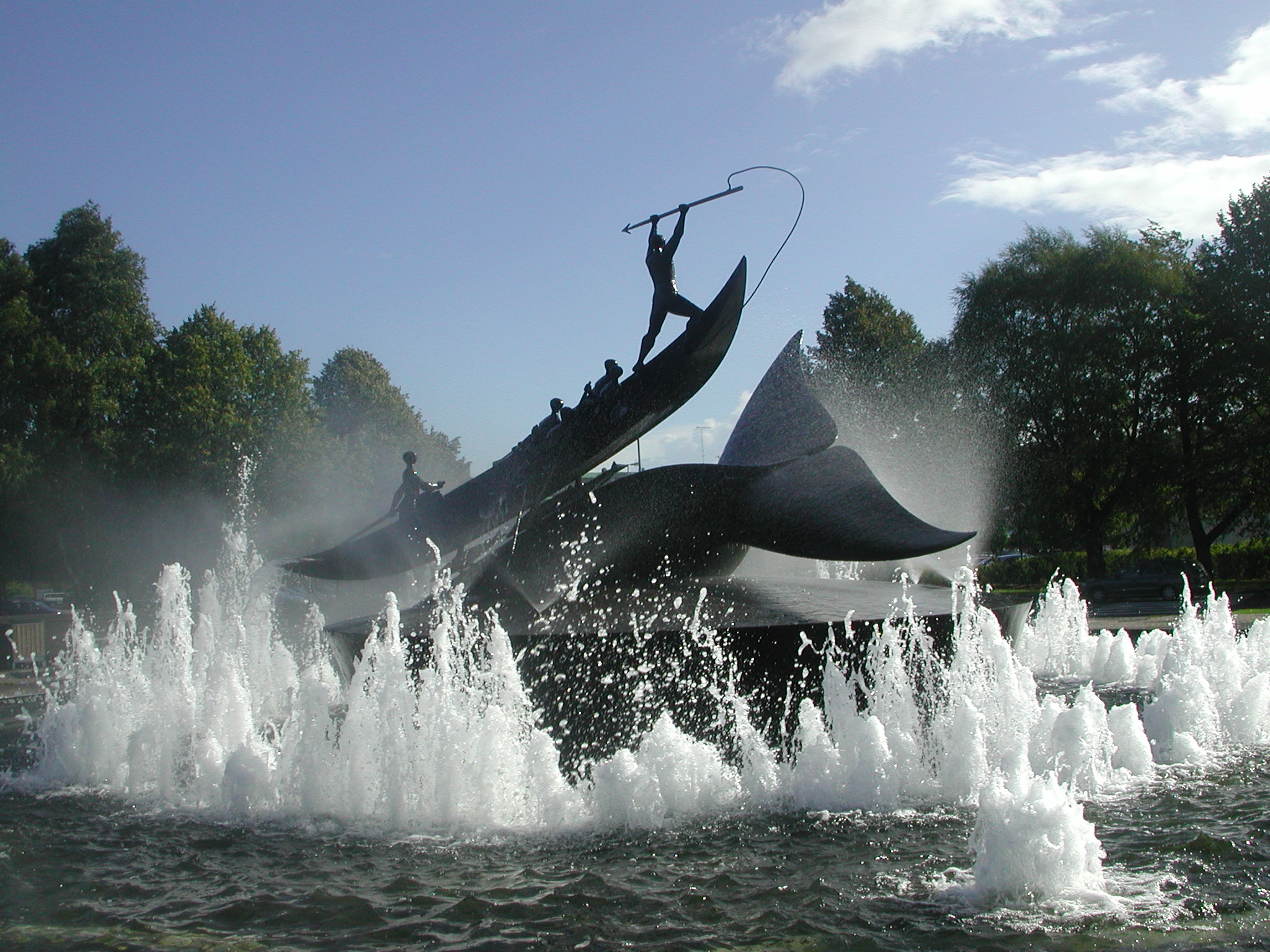

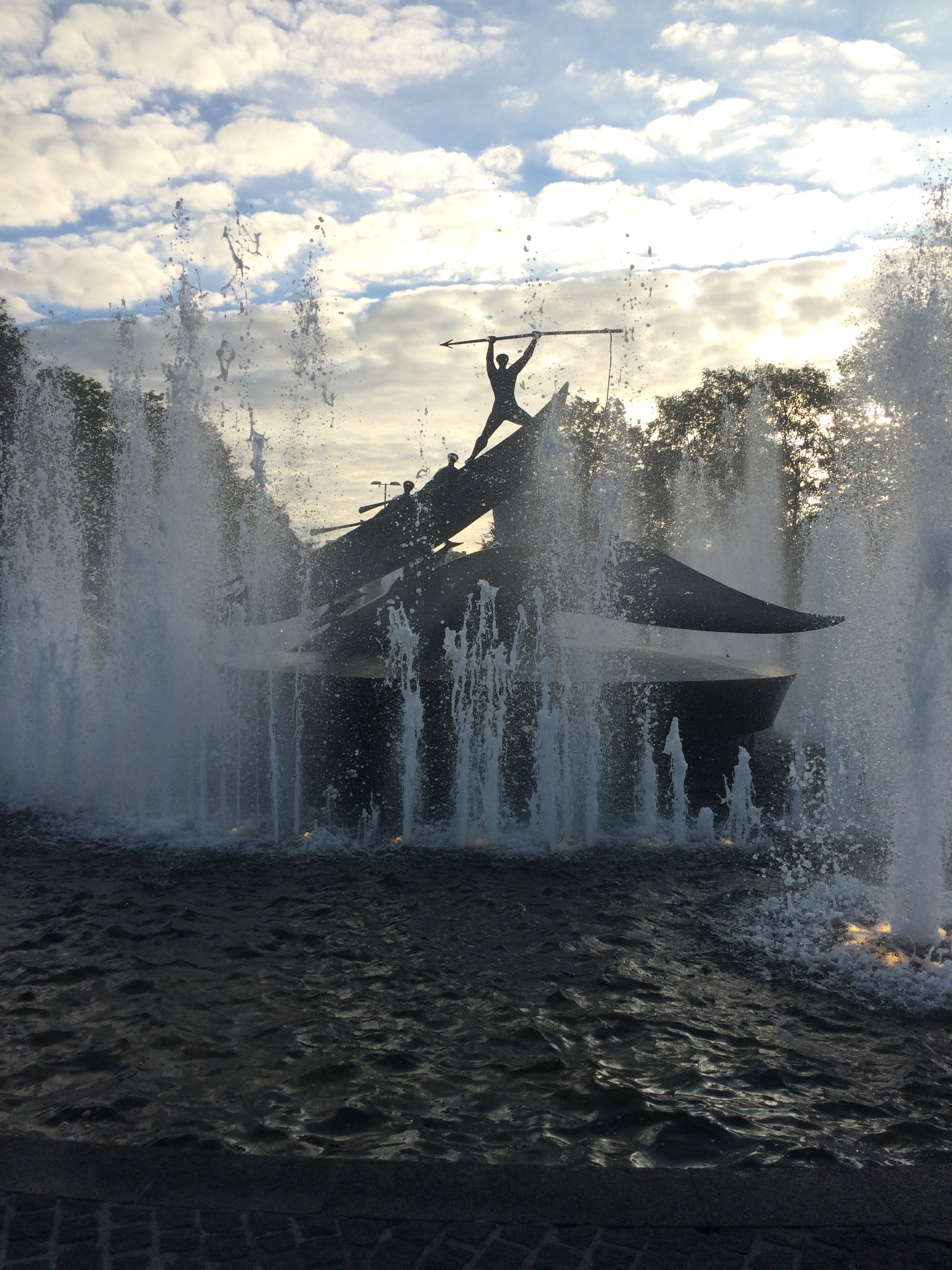
