= Skallen Glacier =

Glacier in Antarctica

- Location of Queen Maud Land in Antarctica

- Location within Antarctica
- Location: Queen Maud Land
- Coordinates: 69°40′S 39°33′E
- Thickness: unknown
- Terminus: Lützow-Holm Bay
- Status: unknown

Skallen Glacier (69°40′S 39°33′E) is a glacier flowing to Lutzow-Holm Bay to the east of Skallen Hills. Mapped from surveys and air photos by Japanese Antarctic Research Expedition (JARE), 1957–62, and named for its proximity to Skallen Hills.

== See also ==
- List of glaciers in the Antarctic
- Glaciology
