= Lyddan Island =

Coordinates: 74°25′S 20°45′W

Lyddan Island is an ice-covered island located at the southwestern extremity of the Riiser-Larsen Ice Shelf, separating it from the Brunt Ice Shelf, about 20 nautical miles (37 km) off the Princess Martha Coast of Antarctica. It is about 45 nautical miles (80 km) long and has three narrow arms in the form of a trefoil. It was discovered and plotted by W.R. MacDonald on November 5, 1967, in the course of a U.S. Navy Squadron VXE-6 reconnaissance flight over the coast in LC-130 aircraft, and was named by the Advisory Committee on Antarctic Names for Robert H. Lyddan, Chief Topographic Engineer of the United States Geological Survey, who had been active in the planning and supervision of Antarctic mapping operations since the 1950s.

Though originally recorded as an island, later research has shown that the ground surface under the ice is below sea level, indicating that "ice rise" might be a more accurate naming.
