= Princess Martha Coast =

Portion of the coast of Queen Maud Land lying between 05° E and 20° W

Coordinates: 72°0′S 7°30′W

Princess Martha Coast (Norwegian: Kronprinsesse Märtha Kyst) is the portion of the coast of Queen Maud Land lying between 05° E and the terminus of Stancomb-Wills Glacier, at 20° W. The entire coastline is bounded by ice shelves with ice cliffs 20 to 35 metres (66 to 115 ft) high.

The name "Crown Princess Martha Land" was originally applied by Captain Hjalmar Riiser-Larsen to that section of the coast in the vicinity of Cape Norvegia which he discovered from the Norvegia and roughly charted from the air during February 1930. It is named in honour of Crown Princess Märtha of Norway.

On 19 January 1939 Nazi Germany reached the Martha Coast, as part of the German Antarctic Expedition.

Troll is located in the eastern part, 235 kilometres (146 mi) from the coast. Explora Escarpment is an undersea escarpment off the coast.
