= Prince Harald Coast =

Coast of Queen Maud Land, Antarctica

Coordinates: 69°30′S 36°0′E

Prince Harald Coast (Norwegian: Prins Harald Kyst) is a portion of the coast of Queen Maud Land, Antarctica, encompassing Lutzow-Holm Bay, lying between Riiser-Larsen Peninsula, at 34° E, and the east entrance point of Lützow-Holm Bay, marked by the coastal angle at 40° E. It was discovered during a flight on February 4, 1937, by Viggo Widerøe, Nils Romnaes, and Mrs. Ingrid Christensen of the Lars Christensen Expedition, 1936–1937, and named after the infant son of the Crown Prince of Norway. The portion of the coast to the east of it is the Prince Olav Coast.
