= Flatvaer Islands =

Archipelago of Antarctica

- Location within Antarctica

Geography
- Location: Antarctica
- Coordinates: 69°01′S 39°33′E

Administration
- Administered under the Antarctic Treaty System

Demographics
- Population: Uninhabited

The Flatvaer Islands (Norwegian: Flatvær, meaning "flat islands"), also known as the Ongul Islands, are a group of small islands lying at the east side of the entrance of Lützow-Holm Bay, 4 km from the coastline of Antarctica. They were mapped by Norwegian cartographers from air photos taken by the Lars Christensen Expedition (LCE), 1936–37. Many of the islands and their features were subsequently named by members of the Japanese Antarctic Research Expedition (JARE); unless otherwise noted, features noted in this article were named by JARE.

The Flatvaer Islands are separated from Lützow-Holm Bay by Ongul Sound, which is 2 mi (3.2 km) wide and named in association with Ongul Island. On its east margin, opposite East Ongul Island, sits a small cluster of rocks called the Mukai Rocks. The name Mukai-iwa, meaning "facing rocks" or "opposite rocks," was given by JARE Headquarters in 1972.

== Ongul and East Ongul Islands ==
The largest of the Flatvaer Islands is Ongul Island, at 2.8 kilometres (1.5 nmi) long. When initially surveyed, the LCE believed this island to be connected to East Ongul Island, a 2 kilometres (1 nmi) island immediately east of the northern part of Ongul Island. The LCE applied the name "Ongul" ("fishhook"), which is suggestive of the outline of the two islands when taken together. In 1957, the Japanese Antarctic Research Expedition (JARE) discovered that "Ongul" was actually two islands, separated by the Nakano-seto Strait, meaning "central strait". The name Ongul Island was retained for the largest island in the group, and the smaller island was given the name East Ongul Island. Showa Station, a Japanese permanent research station, was built on East Ongul Island in 1957.

Lake O-ike ("big pond") is a lake in the east extremity of Ongul Island, so named because it is the largest lake on the island. Shōwa Flat is a small flattish area along the northwest shore of the lake. It was named Shōwa-taira ("Emperor Hirohito's era flat"), presumably in association with Showa Station.

== Minor islands ==
The northwesternmost island of the Flatvaer Islands is Utholmen Island, meaning "the outer island". Meholmen Island, meaning "the middle island", sits between Utholmen and Ongul. Both were named by LCE personnel.

East Ongul Island is separated from nearby Nesøya ("the point island") to the north by the Kitano-seto Strait ("northern strait"). Nesøya is 0.93 kilometres (0.5 nmi) long, and lies close off the north point of East Ongul Island. It was named by LCE personnel. Antenna Island, named by JARE in 1972, is a tiny island in the strait between Nesøya and East Ongul.

Just 1 kilometre (0.5 nmi) northwest of the Nakano-seto Strait is a cluster of small islands: Wakadori Island ("young-bird island"), Hiyoko Island ("baby chick island"), and Mendori Island ("hen island"). Mendori Island was named in association with nearby Ondori Island ("rooster island"), which sits 2 kilometres (1 nmi) north of Ongul Island.

Pollholmen, which is 0.56 kilometres (0.3 nmi) long, is situated 0.19 kilometres (0.1 nmi) off the southeast side of East Ongul Island. LCE personnel named it Pollholmen, meaning "bay island", presumably because of its location opposite the narrow inlet or bay separating Ongul and East Ongul.

To the south, narrow Minamino-seto Strait ("southern strait") separates Ongul Island from the Te Islands, a group of three small islands and several nearby rocks. Norwegian cartographers, working from air photos taken by LCE personnel, initially mapped the three main islands as one in error, giving it the name Teoya ("tea island"). JARE personnel later determined the feature was actually a cluster of islands, but retained the name Te for the group. Ongulgalten Island, meaning "the fishhook boar", was named by LCE in association with Ongul Island. It is the northernmost of the cluster.

Ongulkalven Island lies 1.9 kilometres (1 nmi) west of Ongul Island, separated by Nishino-seto Strait ("western strait"). The island was named "Ongulkalven" ("the fishhook calf") in association with Ongul Island by LCE. Kurumi Island ("walnut island") sits between Ongulkalven and Ongul in the strait. Mame Island ("bean island") lies 0.2 kilometres (0.1 nmi) west of Ongul.
