= Knut Steen =

Norwegian sculptor (1924–2011)

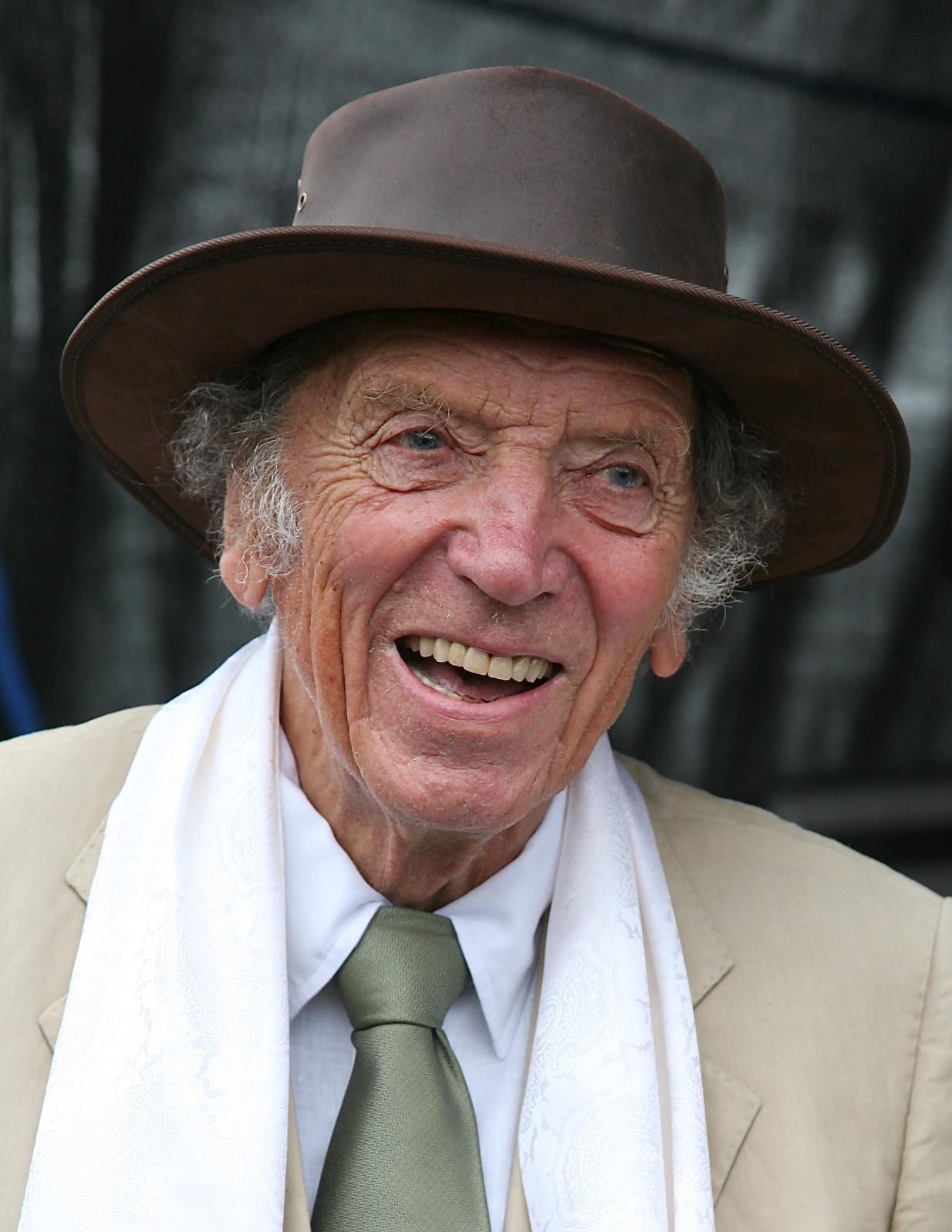
- Knut Steen, 2007
- Born: 19 November 1924; Oslo, Norway
- Died: 22 September 2011 (aged 86); Sandefjord, Norway
- Known for: Sculpting
- Spouse: Inger Dag Steen

Knut Steen (19 November 1924 – 22 September 2011) was a Norwegian sculptor. Steen lived in Sandefjord for most of his life and dedicated works such as the Whaler's Monument to the city. Many of his sculptures may also be seen at Midtåsen Sculpture Park, a park dedicated to Steen at the former villa of Anders Jahre in Sandefjord.

== Biography ==
Steen was born in Oslo, Norway. He was the eldest of four siblings born to Johannes Steen (1895–1983) and Jenny Charlotte Huseby (1895–1976). As a young child, he suffered from tuberculosis before he underwent major lung surgery in 1951. He entered the Norwegian National Academy of Craft and Art Industry (Statens Håndverks- og Kunstindustriskole) in 1944 and the following year at the Norwegian National Academy of Fine Arts (Statens kunstakademi). His teachers included Stinius Fredriksen and Danish sculptor Per Palle Storm.

Steen is often associated with his work on the Norwegian National Academy of Fine Arts in conjunction with the Per Palle Storm. Perhaps his most notable and commonly recognized work is his Whaler’s Monument (Hvalfangstmonumentet), a rotating bronze statue located by the harbor in Sandefjord, Norway. The monument depicting four stylized figures of whalers with oars in an open boat was first unveiled in 1960.

In 2000, he was commissioned to create a statue of King Olav V of Norway, which became the subject of great controversy. At a cost of NOK 2 million (US$317,000), Steen based his statue on a photo of the king in military garb and depicted him in a serious pose with his right arm raised. This drew the ire of critics, who compared it with similar statues of dictators. Eventually, the Oslo City Council rejected the work and the statue was later installed in Gulen Municipality.

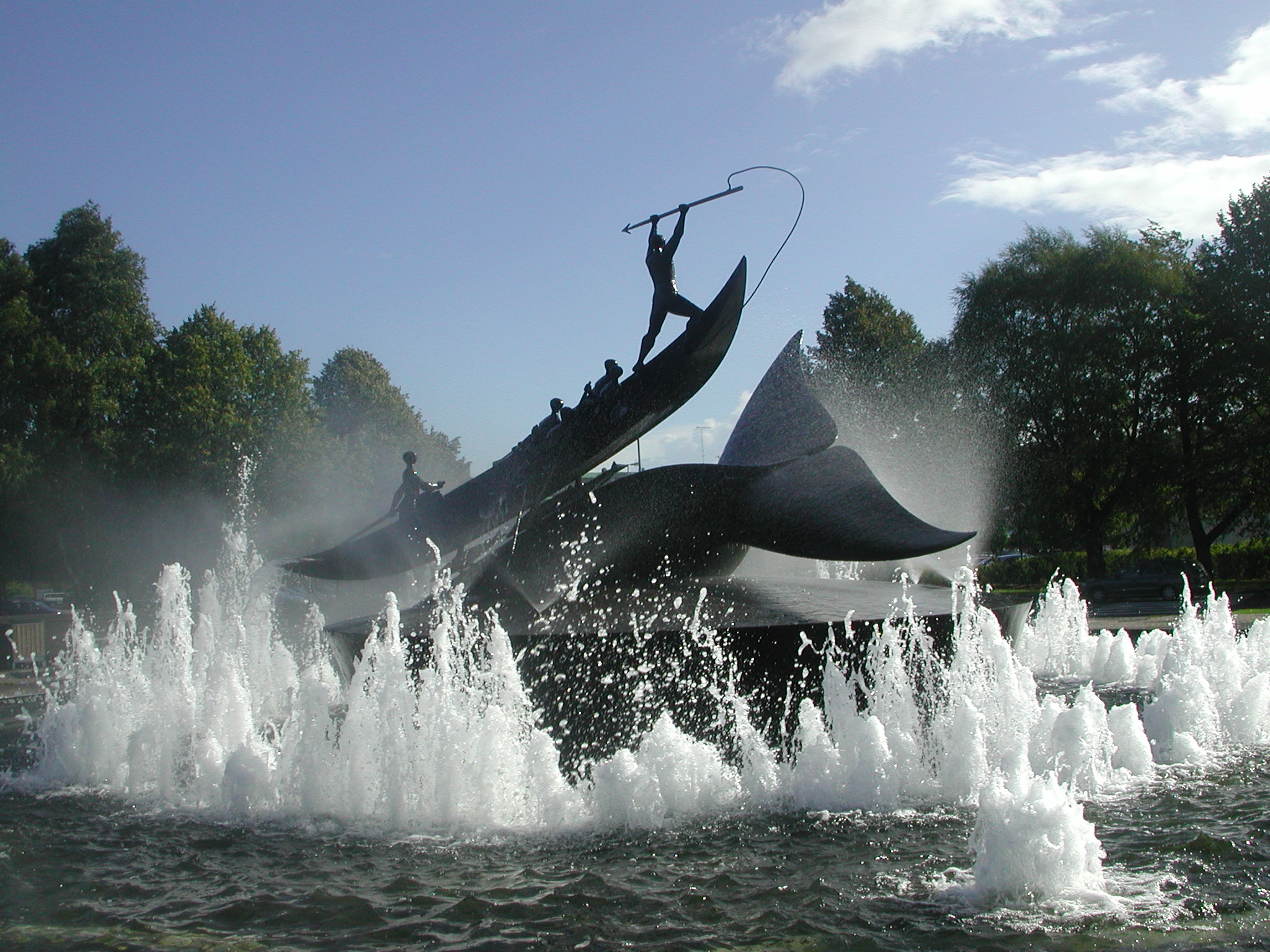
Whaler’s Monument (Hvalfangstmonumentet) at Sandefjord

Steen lived and worked in Pietrasanta, Italy, in 1973. He died at Sandefjord in September 2011. The Knut Steen Foundation (Knut Steens Venneforening) has fostered the development of the Knut Steens Pavilion at Midtasen Sculpture Park in Sandefjord which features works of Steen in marble and bronze. The foundation has also made his studio in Pietrasanta open for public viewing.

== Selected works ==
- Monument to Fredrik Paasche, University Garden, Oslo, 1950
- Monument to Rudolf Nilsen, Rudolf Nilsens plass, Oslo, 1953
- Whaler's Monument , Sandefjord, 1960
- Landscape Pan, Gjøvik 1966
- Nike, Tromsø Maskinistskole, Tromsø, 1967
- Revival history, Hønefoss 1979
- Aurora and Sapfo, Concert Hall, Oslo, 1981
- Aurora, Government Building, Oslo, 1982
- Fantastico, Sandvika 1985
- Drømmersken, marble, Ekebergparken, Oslo, 1992
- Olav Kyrre, Bergen 1998
- King Olav 5, granite, 2006
