= Shinnan Glacier =

Glacier in Antarctica

- Location of Queen Maud Land in Antarctica

- Location within Antarctica
- Location: Queen Maud Land
- Coordinates: 67°55′S 44°38′E
- Thickness: unknown
- Terminus: nearby Shinnan Rocks
- Status: unknown

Shinnan Glacier (Japanese: 新南氷河, Shinnan Hyoga) is a glacier which flows northwest to the coast just east of Shinnan Rocks and marks the division between Queen Maud Land and Enderby Land. Mapped from surveys and air photos by Japanese Antarctic Research Expedition (JARE), 1957–62, and named Shinnan Hyōga (new south glacier).

== See also ==
- Kakure Rocks, rocky exposures along the east wall of Shinnan Glacier
- List of glaciers in the Antarctic
- Glaciology
