= Langnes Fjord =

Fjord and bay in Antarctica

Langnes Fjord (68°30′S 78°15′E) is a narrow fjord, 10 nautical miles (19 km) long, between Langnes Peninsula and Breidnes Peninsula in the Vestfold Hills of Antarctica. It was mapped from air photos by the Lars Christensen Expedition (1936–37) and named after Langnes Peninsula. John Roscoe's 1952 study of air photos taken by U.S. Navy Operation Highjump (1946–47) revealed that this fjord continues farther east than was previously mapped, and that it includes what had been plotted as an isolated lake which the Norwegians had called "Breidvatnet."
