= Stancomb-Wills Glacier =

Glacier of Antarctica

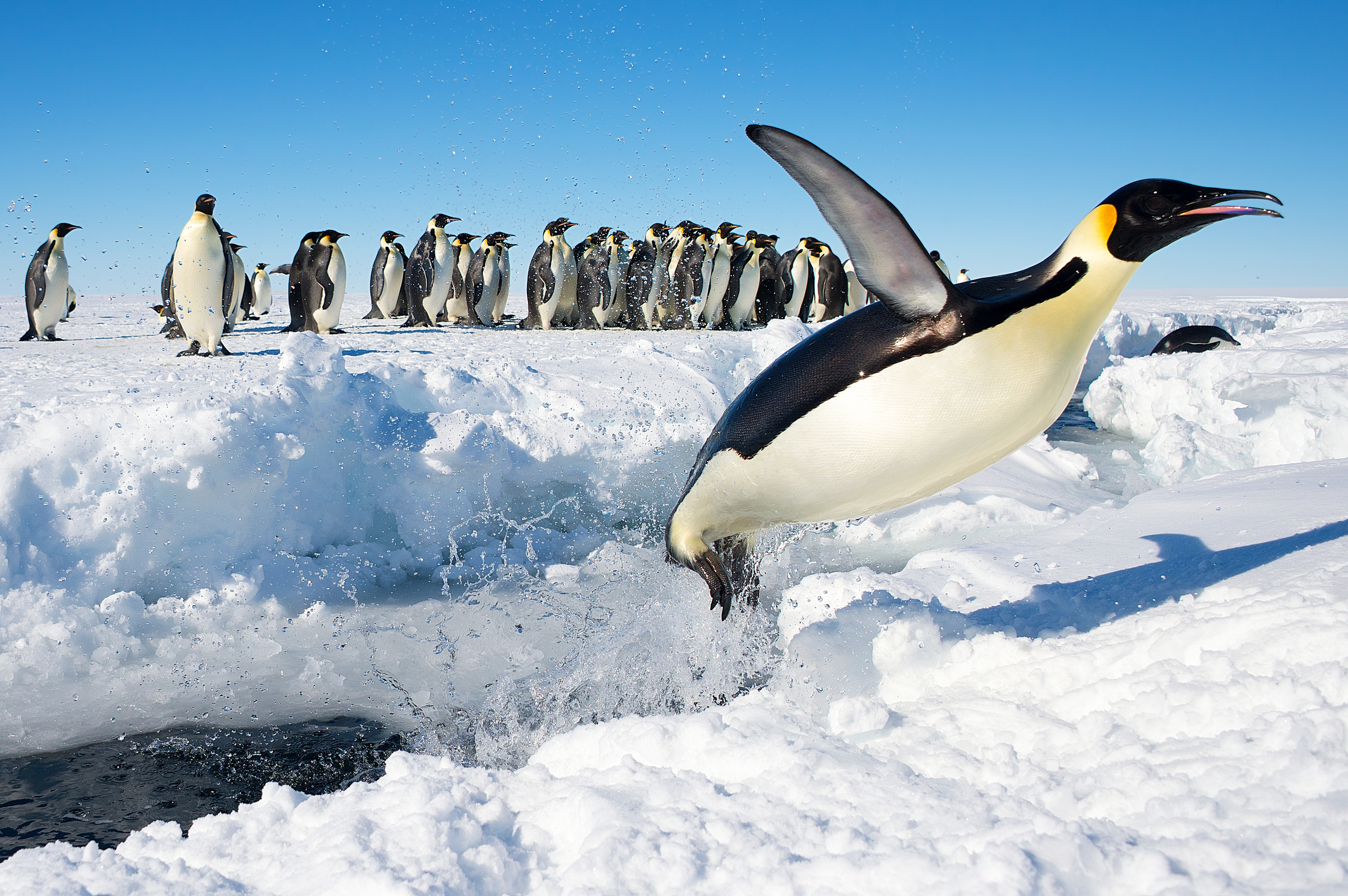
- Emperor penguins breed in the IBA

- Location within Antarctica
- Type: cirque
- Location: Coats Land
- Coordinates: 75°18′S 19°00′W
- Thickness: unknown
- Terminus: Weddell Sea
- Status: unknown

The Stancomb-Wills Glacier is a large glacier that debouches into the eastern Weddell Sea southward of Lyddan Island. The glacier was discovered in the course of the U.S. Navy LC-130 plane flight over the coast on November 5, 1967, and was plotted by the United States Geological Survey (USGS) from photographs obtained at that time. The name was applied by the Advisory Committee on Antarctic Names (US-ACAN) in 1969.

== Glacier Tongue ==
The Stancomb-Wills Glacier Tongue (75°0′S 22°0′W) is the extensive seaward projection of the Stancomb-Wills Glacier into the eastern Weddell Sea. The cliffed front of this feature was discovered in January 1915 by a British expedition led by Ernest Shackleton. He named it "Stancomb-Wills Promontory," after Dame Janet Stancomb-Wills, one of the principal donors of the expedition. In 1969, US-ACAN amended the name to "Stancomb-Wills Glacier Tongue". This followed the U.S. Navy flight on which the glacier was discovered and the relationship with the glacier tongue was first observed.

== Important Bird Area ==
The Stancomb-Wills Glacier Important Bird Area (74°06′15″S 23°05′31″W) is a 352 ha site which has been designated an Important Bird Area (IBA) by BirdLife International because it supports a breeding colony of about 5,500 emperor penguins, as estimated from 2009 satellite imagery, on fast ice on the north-eastern coast of the glacier tongue, some 60 km west of Lyddan Island.

== See also ==
- List of glaciers in the Antarctic
- List of Antarctic ice streams
- Glaciology
