= Hjalmar Riiser-Larsen =

Norwegian aviation pioneer, military officer, polar explorer and businessman

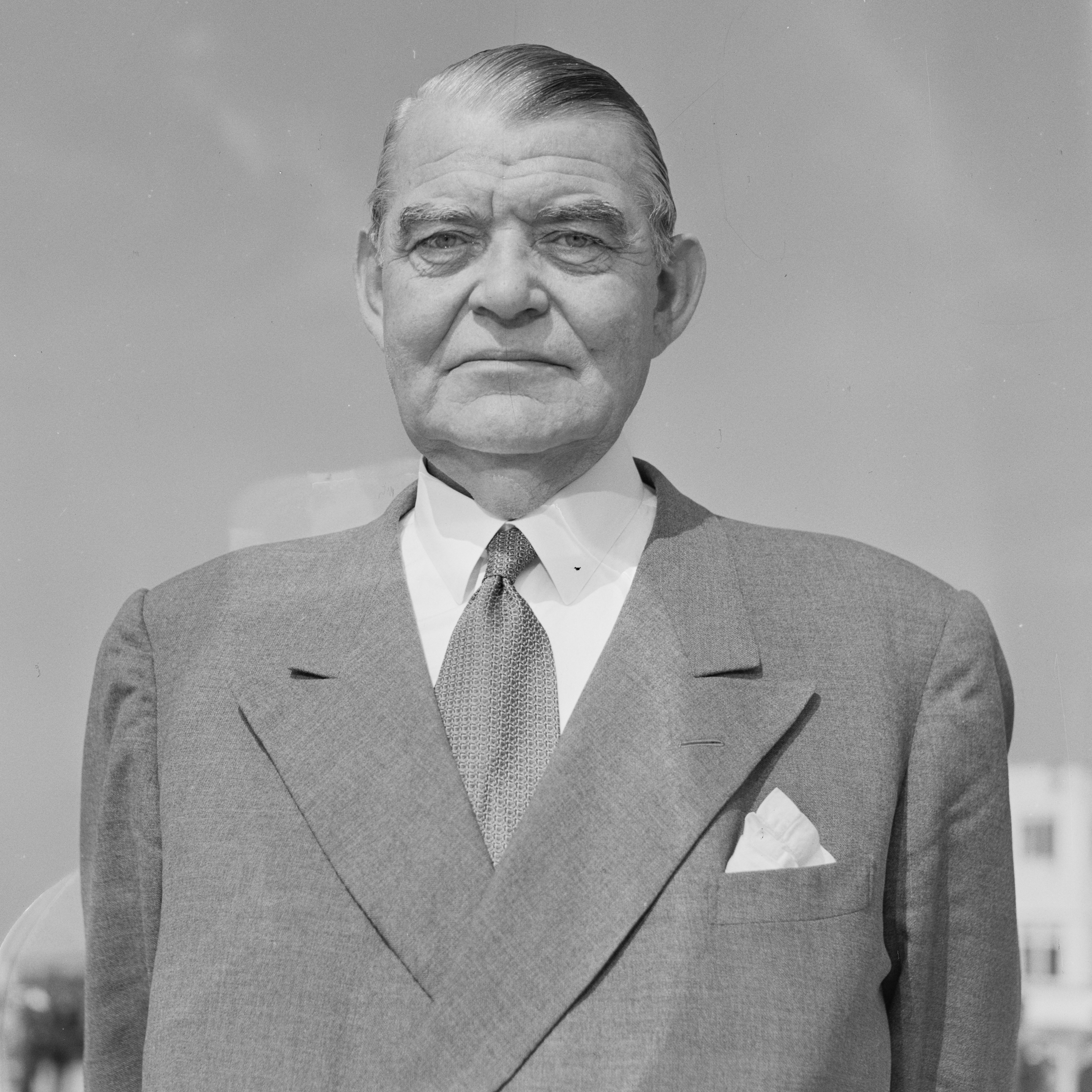
- Riiser-Larsen in 1953
- Born: 7 June 1890; Norway
- Died: 3 June 1965 (aged 74)
- Allegiance: Norway
- Service years: 1909–1933, 1940–1946
- Rank: Major General
- Commands: Royal Norwegian Navy Air Service; Royal Norwegian Air Force
- Conflicts: World War II
- Other work: Polar exploration Aviation leader

Hjalmar Riiser-Larsen (7 June 1890 – 3 June 1965) was a Norwegian aviation pioneer, military officer, polar explorer and businessman. Among his achievements, he is generally regarded a founder of the Royal Norwegian Air Force.

== Background ==
Riiser-Larsen was born in Kristiania, Norway. In 1909, aged nineteen, he joined the Norwegian Naval Academy. In 1915 he became a 1st lieutenant in the newly formed Royal Norwegian Navy Air Service (RNoNAS). After World War I, he served as the acting head of the RNoNAS's factory until a more senior officer was appointed. In 1921, he joined the Aviation Council, then part of the Norwegian Ministry of Defence, as a secretary. This gave him the opportunity to study the fledgling military and civil aviation infrastructure for which the council was responsible. He also became a frequent pilot on the air routes used by the new aviation companies.

== Polar exploration ==
=== Flying over the North Pole ===
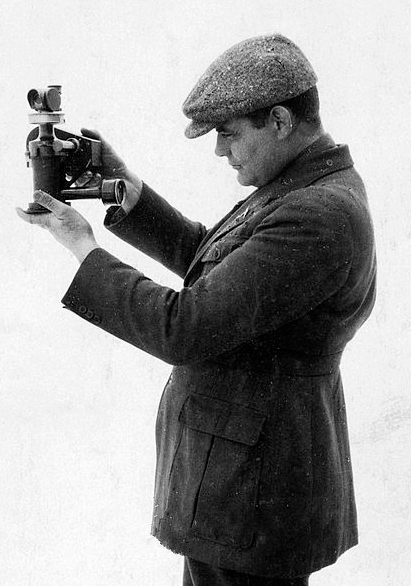
Riiser-Larsen during one of Amundsen's expeditions

Riiser-Larsen's years of polar exploration began in 1925 when his compatriot Roald Amundsen, the famed polar explorer, asked him to be his deputy and pilot for an attempt to fly over the North Pole. Riiser-Larsen agreed and secured the use of two Dornier Do J Wal seaplanes, with Karl Feucht as one of two expedition flight mechanics. The expedition, however, was forced to land close to the Pole, badly damaging one of the planes. After twenty-six days on an ice shelf, first trying to shovel tons of snow to create an airstrip, until someone suggested the easier way of tramping the snow surface, the expedition's six members squeezed themselves into the remaining plane. Riiser-Larsen somehow managed to coax the overloaded plane into the air and flew the expedition back to the coast of Northern Svalbard.

The following year, Riiser-Larsen rejoined Amundsen for another attempt to fly over the Pole, this time with Italian aeronautical engineer Umberto Nobile in his recently renamed airship, the Norge. Leaving Spitsbergen on 11 May 1926, the Norge completed the crossing two days later, landing near Teller, Alaska. The flight is considered by many to be the first successful overflight or journey of any kind to the North Pole, as the other claimants, Frederick Cook, Robert Peary and Richard Byrd, were unable to verify their attempts in full.

In 1928, Riiser-Larsen became involved in searching the Arctic for Nobile after he had made a successful flight to the Siberian islands and visited the North Pole once more, but crashed near the coast of the North Eastern part of Svalbard. Riiser-Larsen also became involved in a search for Amundsen, when he as passenger in a French naval flying boat went missing while he was en route to join the search for Nobile. Eventually Nobile and most of his team were found, but Amundsen was not.

=== The Norvegia expeditions ===
The Norvegia expeditions were a sequence of Antarctic expeditions financed by the Norwegian shipowner and whaling merchant Lars Christensen during the late 1920s and 1930s. Ostensibly their goal was scientific research and the discovery of new whaling grounds, but Christensen also requested permission from the Norwegian Foreign Office to claim for Norway any uncharted territory that was found. By the end of the second expedition, two small islands in the Southern Ocean, Bouvet Island and Peter I Island, had been annexed. In 1929 Christensen decided to include aeroplanes in the next expedition and appointed Riiser-Larsen its leader. Riiser-Larsen then supervised and took part in mapping most of the Antarctic in this and three further expeditions. More territory was also annexed, this time the large area of the continent known as Queen Maud Land.

== Commerce and war ==
In 1939, the Norwegian military was downsized and Riiser-Larssen was among those officers finding themselves out of work. However, he was quickly offered a new job by the shipping company Fred. Olsen & Co. as manager of its newly formed airline, DNL. He invited some former naval pilots to join the airline and soon made it the most successful in Norway. In 1946, DNL would be one of the four Scandinavian airlines merged to create the present-day Scandinavian Airlines System (SAS).

During the Nazi German occupation of Norway, Riiser-Larsen rejoined the Royal Norwegian Navy Air Service. However, both the Norwegian Army and Royal Norwegian Navy Air Services were quickly overwhelmed by the Wehrmacht before he saw combat. Instead, he accompanied the Norwegian cabinet and military leaders into exile in London, before moving on to Canada, to become the first commander of the Royal Norwegian Air Force training camp dubbed Little Norway in Ontario.

At the beginning of 1941, Riiser-Larsen returned to London to take up the post of Commander in Chief of the Naval Air Service; then of the Combined Arms Air Force; and finally, in 1944, of the fully amalgamated Royal Norwegian Air Force. By the end of the war, however, many of the pilots under his command had become critical of his leadership. He resigned, bitterly, from the Air Force in 1946.

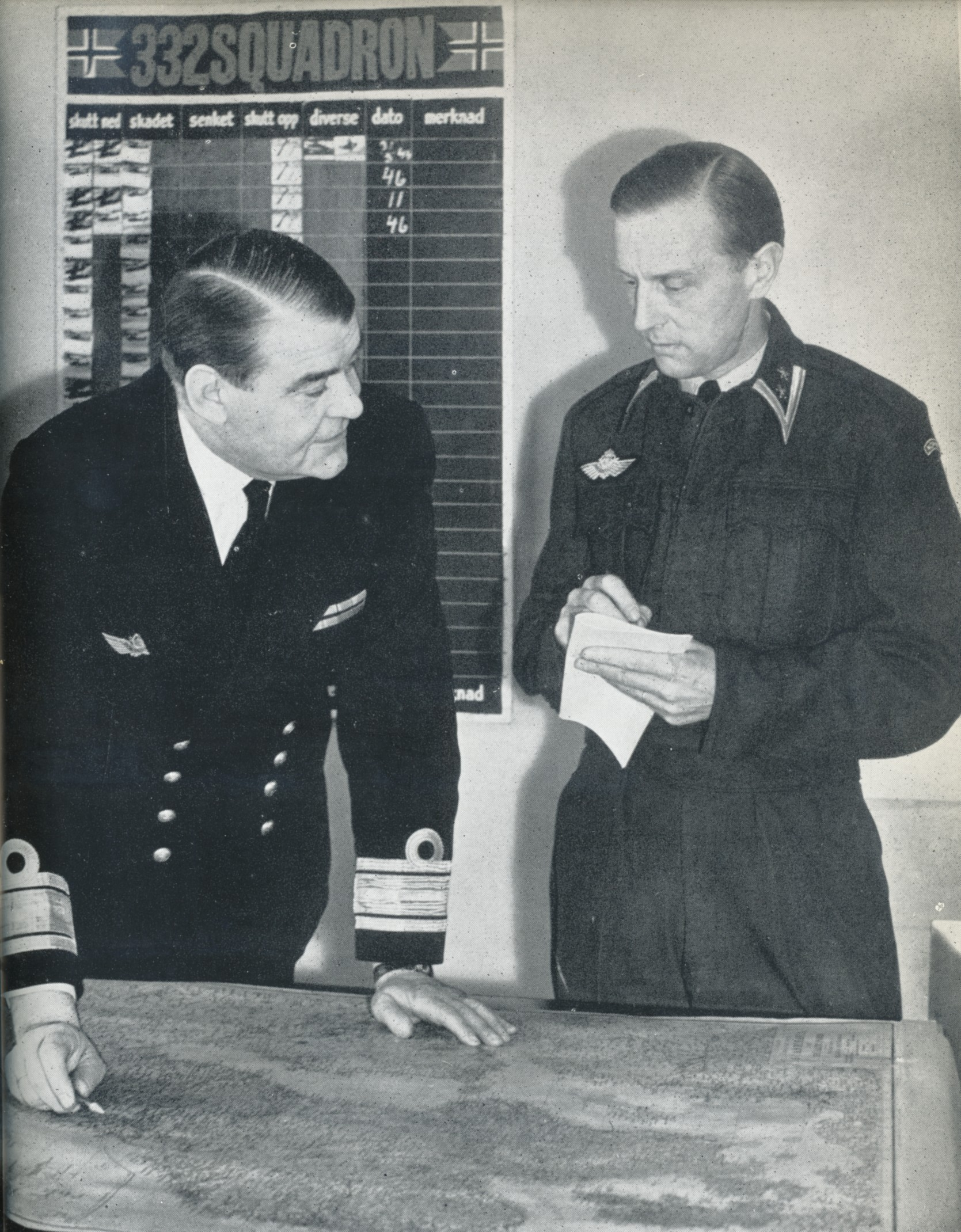
Riiser-Larsen (left) with Birger Fredrik Motzfeldt in 1959

== Return to business ==
In 1947, Riiser-Larsen again became the head of DNL, a few months before it merged with DDL, SIL and ABA to create SAS. He was the director of the Norwegian region of Scandinavian Airlines Systems (SAS) 1950–55. He then became an advisor to the SAS executive and a regional manager with responsibility for transcontinental air routes. One of these routes, although established after his retirement in 1955, represented the "fulfilment of a vision" : the route to North America over the North Pole.

In 1951 Riiser-Larsen was chosen as the president of the World Movement for Federal World Government.

Riiser-Larsen died in 1965, four days before his seventy-fifth birthday, and was buried at the Vår Frelsers gravlund in Oslo.

== See also ==
- Riiser-Larsen Peninsula
- Riiser-Larsen Sea
- Riiser-Larsen Ice Shelf
- Mount Riiser-Larsen

== Bibliography ==
- Hjalmar Riiser-Larsen, Femti År for Kongen (Fifty Years for the King, Riiser-Larsen's autobiography), Oslo: Gyldendal Norsk Forlag, 1958.
