= Japanese Antarctic Research Expedition =

Japanese Antarctic expedition for scientific research

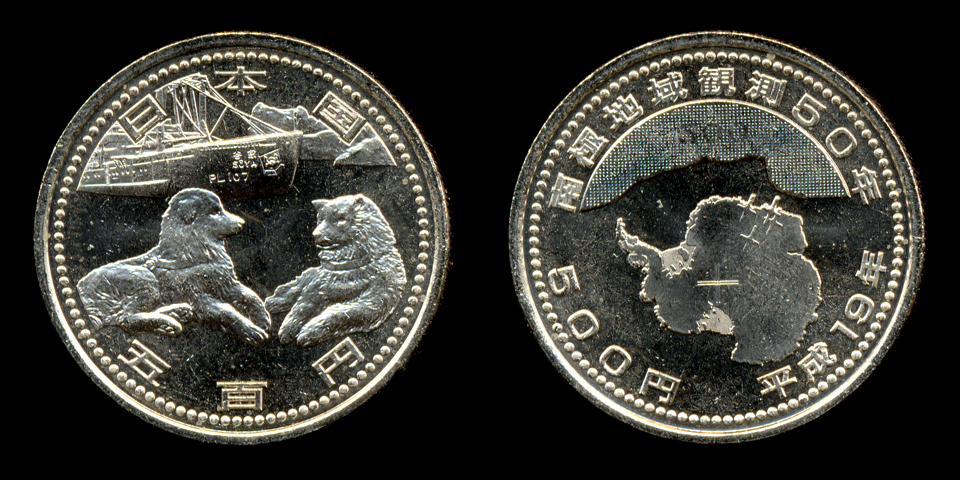
A coin of the Japanese Antarctic Research Expedition, with Taro and Jiro

The Japanese Antarctic Research Expedition (南極地域観測隊, Nankyoku chiiki kansoku-tai; JARE) refers to a series of Japanese Antarctic expeditions for scientific research.

== History ==
The first JARE expedition was launched in 1957 to coordinate with the International Geophysical Year. This was the team which left 15 dogs, including Taro and Jiro, behind after an emergency evacuation in February 1958.

Expeditions to the Antarctic took place from 1968 to 1977, and ice cores were drilled on these expeditions, mostly at Mizuho.

A later instance was an ecological expedition studying the ecosystems near Showa Station in Antarctica. The project was first undertaken in February 1986. It was associated with the international BIOTAS program, which also launched in 1986. Taxonomical studies of some organisms (particularly plants and small animals) were carried out by the expedition.

The current research expedition is "60th Japanese Antarctic Research Expedition" (第60次南極地域観測隊, Dai Rokuju-ji Nankyoku chiiki kansoku-tai) and began in November 2018 as part of the "Japanese Antarctic Research Project Phase IX".

The expedition abandoned 15 Sakhalin Huskies chained up in Antarctica. Only two survived.

Remarkably, Saitō’s commitment to the welfare of animals involved the White House in Washington D.C. This fact is almost forgotten. In February 1958, the first Cross-Winter Expedition for the Japanese Antarctic Survey Team left 15 Sakhalin Huskies chained at the unmanned Shōwa Station, upon the expedition’s return to Japan. (The team took with it one adult female, Shiroko, and her eight puppies who were born in Antarctica.) The second Cross-Winter Expedition Team was to take over from the first team, but the Japanese ice-breaker Sōya could not land them. The team gave up on their mission, and sailed home, leaving the dogs chained at the Shōwa Station. Saitō, as director-general of the JSPCA, went to the Antarctic Headquarters of the Japanese Ministry of Education. He protested the decision of the first Cross-Winter Expedition Team of leaving the dogs chained, and requested a rescue operation for these dogs. The Ministry of Education refused. Nevertheless, Saitō did not give up. In the end, he sent a telegram to President Dwight Eisenhower, requesting that the USS Burton Island recover these dogs. This U.S. Navy Wind-class icebreaker had rescued the Japanese human crew of the first Cross-Winter Expedition Team. President Eisenhower responded and ordered the Navy to proceed with the rescue of these dogs. Unfortunately, the extreme weather forestalled this.[403] Meanwhile, eight of the 15 Sakhalin Huskies managed to break loose from their chains and fended for themselves. In January 1959, the third Cross-Winter Expedition Team found two, out of the 15 dogs, surviving after 11 months. Seven dogs were still chained and buried in the snow. They had died of starvation. The two survivors were siblings of the same litter, Tarō (October 1955–August 1970) and Jirō (October 1955–July 1960). Upon this discovery, Saitō initiated the project to create bronze statues of the 15 dogs at the foot of the brand-new Tokyo Tower in Minato ward, Tokyo. Andō Teru’s son, Takeshi, made their group statues, Nankyoku kansoku de hataraita Karafuto-ken no kinen-zō (Statues in Commemoration of the Sakhalin Huskies Who Worked for the Antarctica Survey).[404] There are also statues of the 15 dogs in Ōhama Park in Sakai, Osaka prefecture, and statutes of Tarō and Jirō at the Nagoya Port Antarctica Park in Nagoya, Aichi prefecture. People were deeply touched by their true story, so that an unprecedented collaboration of mass media produced the film, Nankyoku monogatari (The Tale of Antarctica), in 1983. Their story also inspired the Walt Disney studio to produce Eight Below in 2006.

— Mayumi Itoh (2017, Hachikō: Solving Twenty Mysteries about the Most Famous Dog in Japan, pages: 247-249)

== Sources ==
- MacKinnon, P.K. (1980). Ice Cores. Washington DC: World Data Center A for Glaciology [Snow and Ice]. ISSN 0149-1776.
