= Lars Christensen =

Norwegian businessman (1884–1965)

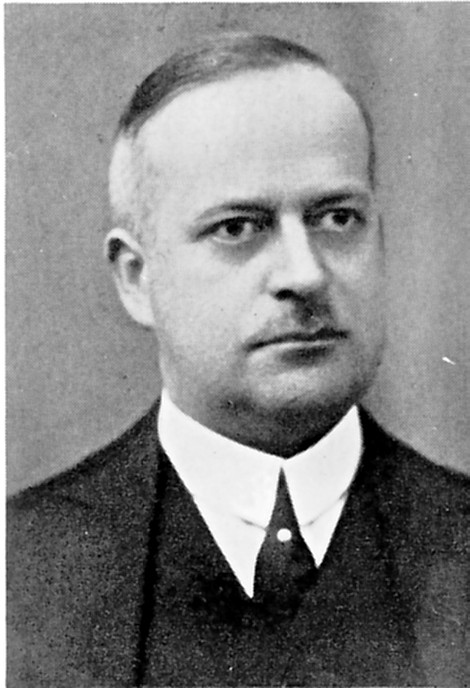
- Born: 6 April 1884; Sandeherred Municipality, Vestfold, Norway
- Died: 10 December 1964 (aged 80); New York City, New York
- Known for: Whaling; Antarctic exploration
- Spouse: Ingrid Christensen

Lars Christensen (6 April 1884 – 10 December 1965) was a Norwegian shipowner and whaling magnate. He was also a philanthropist with a keen interest in the exploration of Antarctica.

== Career ==
Lars Christensen was born at Sandeherred Municipality in Vestfold, Norway. Born into a wealthy family, Christensen inherited his whaling fleet from his father, Christen Christensen. After completing middle school in 1899, he received training in Germany and at Newcastle upon Tyne, followed by trade college in Kristiania (now Oslo). He started his career as a ship owner in 1906. He ventured into the whaling industry in 1909, and directed several companies, including Framnæs Mekaniske Værksted, AS Thor Dahl, AS Odd, AS Ørnen, AS Thorsholm and Bryde og Dahls Hvalfangstselskap.

Christensen was Danish consul in Sandefjord from 1909. In 1910 Lars Christensen had married Ingrid Dahl (1891–1976), daughter of wholesale merchant and ship owner Thor Dahl (1862–1920). He would later assume control of large part of his father's and his father-in-law's extensive businesses following their deaths during the 1920s.

Endurance, the ship that became famous after Sir Ernest Shackleton's failed Imperial Trans-Antarctic Expedition of 1914, was originally built for Christensen, who intended to use her for Arctic cruises for tourists to hunt polar bears. When this did not happen, Christensen sold the ship to Shackleton.

Christensen had a deep interest in Antarctica and its animal life. He was particularly interested in making geographical discoveries, and gave his captains wide latitude to do so. He financed several expeditions specifically devoted to the exploration of the Antarctic continent and its waters, and participated in some of these himself, even bringing his wife Ingrid with him in the 1936–1937 expedition. He was among the first to use aerial surveying with seaplanes to map the coast of East Antarctica, which he completed from the Weddell Sea to the Shackleton Ice Shelf, concentrating on Bouvetøya and the region from Enderby Land to Coats Land. From the seaplane brought on the 1936–1937 expedition, members took 2,200 oblique aerial photographs, covering 6,250 square miles (16,200 km^{2}). Mrs Christensen became the first woman to fly over the continent.

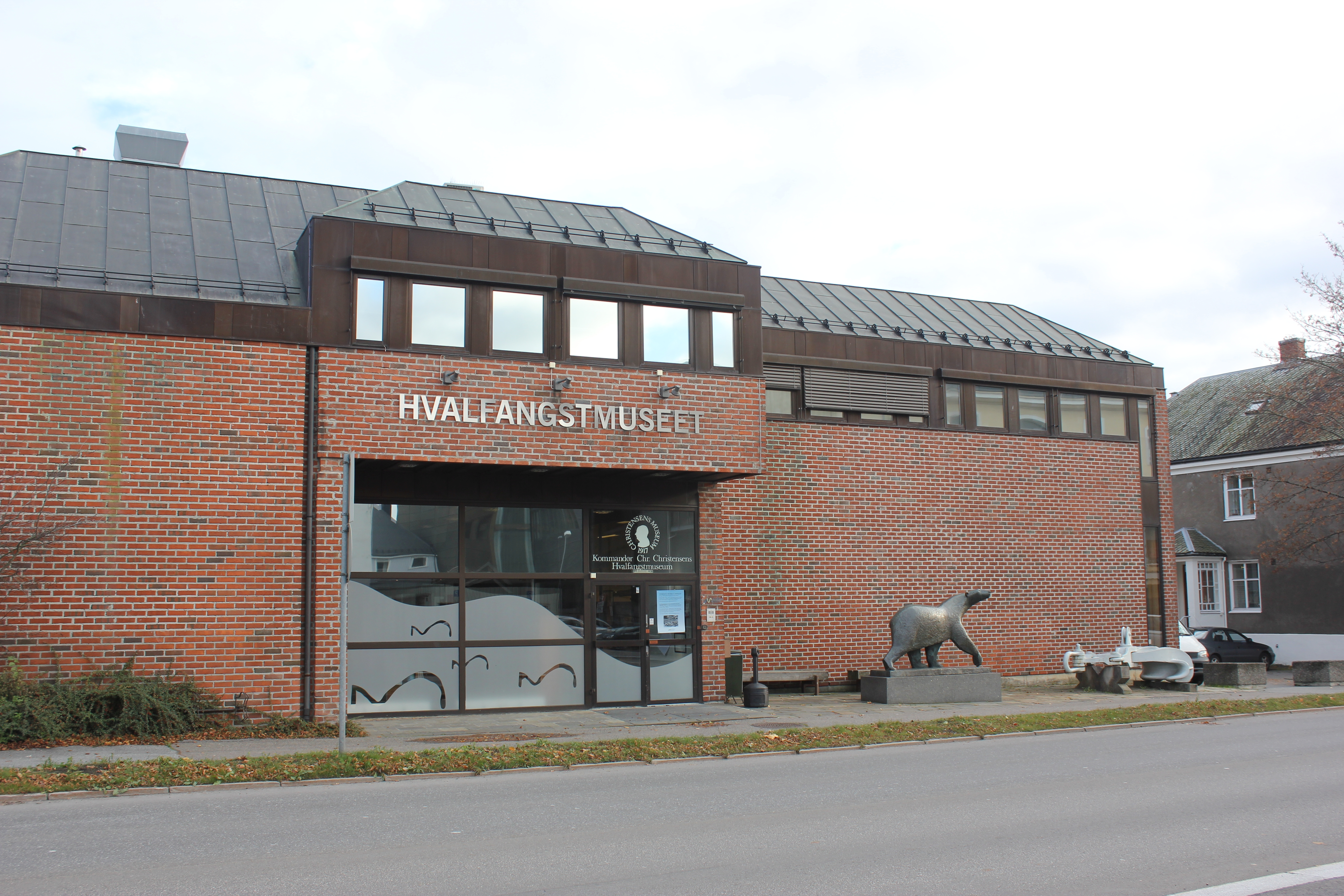
Sandefjord Whaling Museum (Hvalfangstmuseet i Sandefjord))

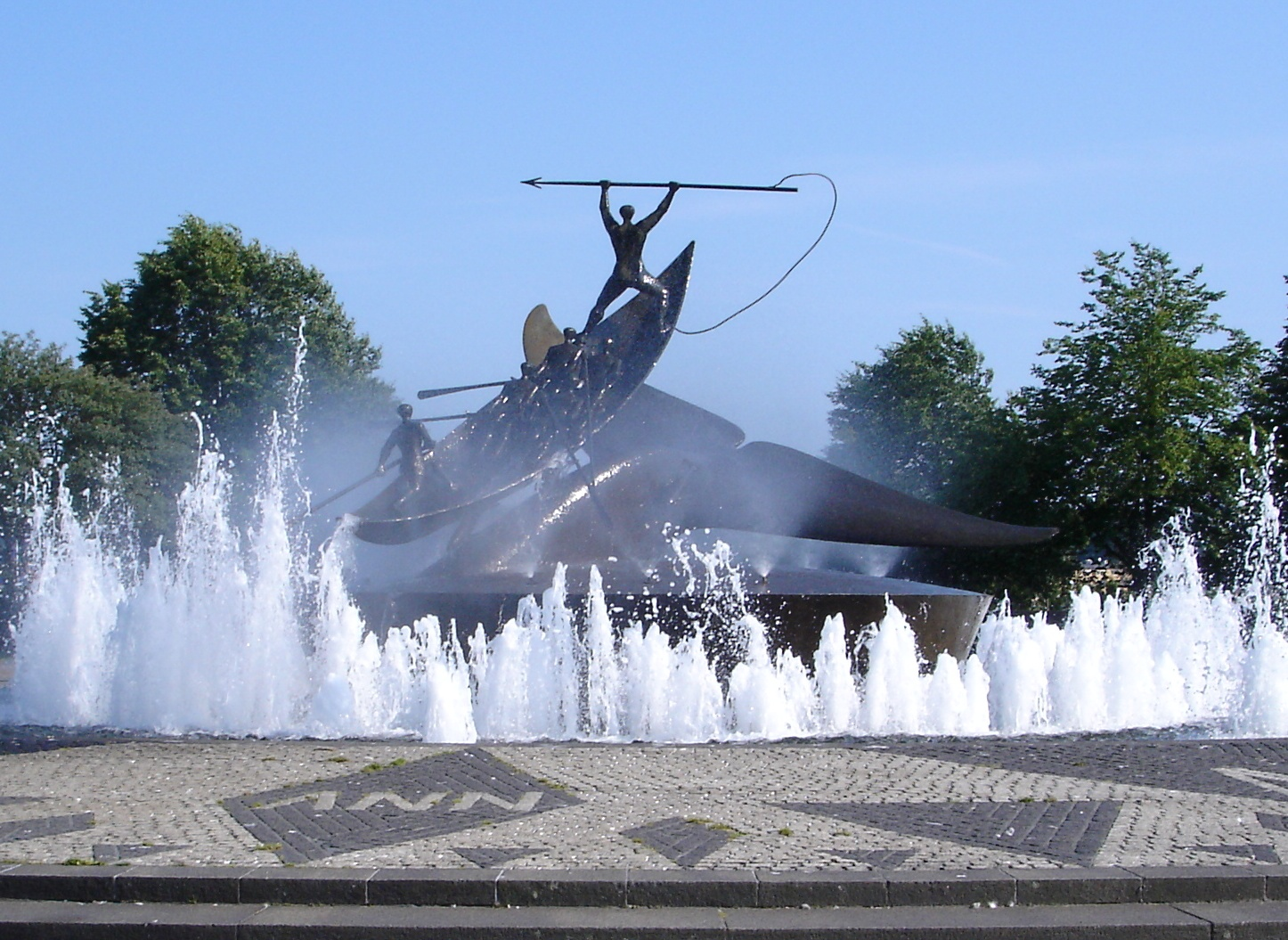
The Whaler's Monument, Sandefjord (Hvalfangstmonumentet)

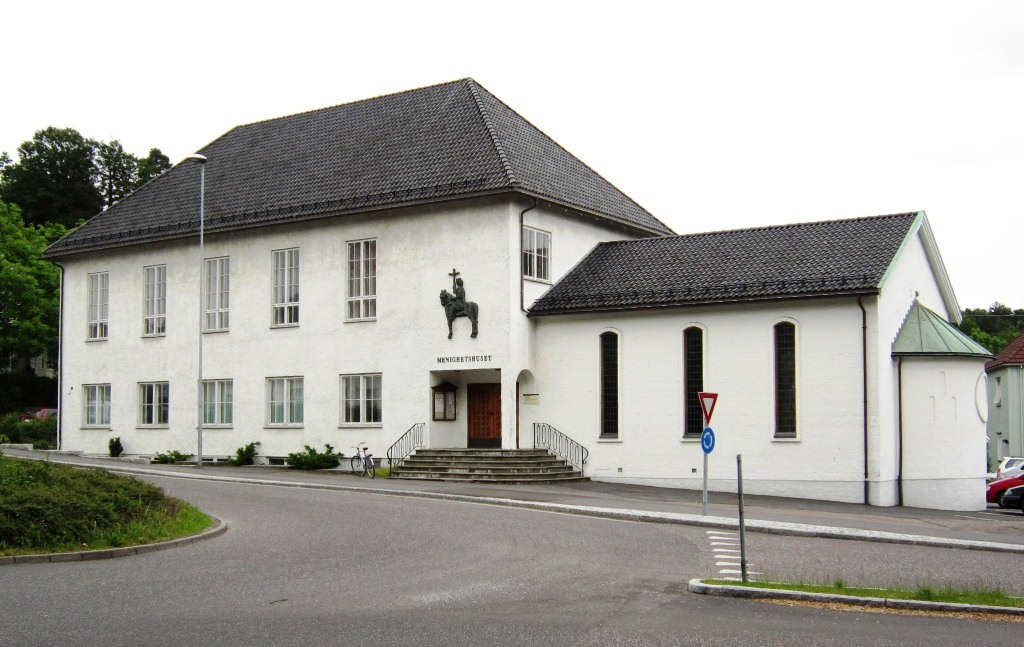
Olav Chapel (Olavskapellet) in Sandefjord

On 1 December 1927, as the leader of one of his financed expeditions, Christensen landed on and claimed the Bouvet Island (Bouvetøya) for Norway; it had previously been claimed by Great Britain, but the British soon abandoned their claim and recognised the island as Norwegian.

On the expeditions he financed between 1927 and 1937, Christensen's men discovered and surveyed substantial new land on the Dronning Maud Land and MacRobertson Land coasts. Places in Antarctica named after Christensen include the Lars Christensen Peak, the Lars Christensen Coast as well as Lars Christensen Land, also known as MacRobertson Land, where the (now closed) Russian Soyuz station operated. In addition, Ingrid Christensen Coast was named after Christensen's wife, one of the first women to visit Antarctica.

During World War II, Christensen was Counsellor of Finance at The Royal Norwegian Embassy in Washington, DC and a member of the Nortraship Council. After the War, the Thor Dahl Group, under the leadership of Christensen, regained its position as one of the leaders in the industry. The business also gained an increasing number of other shipping companies, both tankers and liner shipping.

== Philanthropy ==
Together with Otto Sverdrup and Oscar Wisting, Christensen initiated an expedition to recover another famous ship, the Fram. In 1935 the Fram was installed in the museum where it now stands; the Fram Museum in Oslo.

Sandefjord Whaling Museum (Hvalfangstmuseet i Sandefjord) ) was donated to Sandefjord in 1917. This was one of the first dedicated museum buildings in Norway. In his travels, Christensen collected a considerable volume of literature, including much on the subject of whaling; his interests included research as well as merely supporting the industry. This material was donated to the library of Sandefjord Museum in the 1920s and 1930s. Christensen also provided funds for the further expansion of the Whaling Museum's library, which was overseen by shipping broker, author and consultant Bjarne Aagaard (1873–1956), whose extensive book collection also formed a major addition to the library.

The Whaler's Monument ( Hvalfangstmonumentet) was first unveiled in 1960. The rotating bronze memorial statue is situated by the harbour at the end of Jernbanealleen in Sandefjord. The monument was created by Norwegian sculptor Knut Steen. The costs associated with the design and construction of the sculpture were donated to the city by Lars Christensen.

In 1962, Christensen funded the cost of the construction of Olav Chapel (Olavskapellet) in Sandefjord. Outside the building is a relief of Saint Olav by sculptor Ragnhild Butenschøn. The frame around the front door shows Bible motifs designed by Finn Henrik Bodvin. The altar image was painted by Hugo Lous Mohr.

== Honors ==
He was decorated as a commander of the Order of Vasa. In 1917, he was appointed Commander of the Order of Dannebrog. He was appointed to knight of the Order of St. Olav in 1931 and received the Commander's Cross with the Star of Order of St. Olav in 1944. Christensen was awarded an honorary doctorate at St. Olaf College.

Christensen was a fellow of the Royal Norwegian Society of Sciences and Letters and received its Gunnerus Medal, and an honorary fellow of the Norwegian Academy of Science and Letters. He was an honorary member of the Norwegian Geographic Society and in the Royal Norwegian Science Society in Trondheim and was awarded of the American Geographical Society David Livingstone Centenary Medal in 1935.

== Related reading ==
- Lars Christensen (1938) My Last Expedition to the Antarctic 1936-1937 (Oslo: Johan Grundt Tanum)
- Hans S I Bogen (1955) 70 år. Lars Christensen og hans samtid (Oslo: Johan Grundt Tanum)
