= List of glaciers of Queen Maud Land =

Queen Maud Land in Antarctica

Following is a list of glaciers of Queen Maud Land in Antarctica. This list may not reflect recently named glaciers in Queen Maud Land.

== Crevasse fields ==
- Hamarglovene Crevasses
- Jutulgryta Crevasses
- Jutulpløgsla Crevasses
- Kråsen Crevasse Field
- Styggebrekka Crevasses
- Trollkjelen Crevasse Field
- Ulendet Crevasses

== Glaciers ==
- Akebono Glacier
- Altarduken Glacier
- Anuchin Glacier
- Asimutbreen Glacier
- Austreskorve Glacier
- Barkov Glacier
- Borchgrevinkisen
- Byrdbreen
- Charles Glacier
- Chijire Glacier
- Christiaensen Glacier
- Dakshin Gangotri Glacier
- Ellis Glacier
- Entuziasty Glacier
- Flogeken Glacier
- Giaever Glacier
- Gillock Glacier
- Gjel Glacier
- Glitrefonna Glacier
- Gluvreklett Glacier
- Gunnestad Glacier
- Hålisen Glacier
- Hansenbreen
- Hargreavesbreen
- Hei Glacier
- Heitō Glacier
- Hette Glacier
- Higashi-naga-iwa Glacier
- Honnør Glacier
- Ichime Glacier
- Ising Glacier
- Jennings Glacier
- Kamp Glacier
- Kasumi Glacier
- Koms Glacier
- Kreitzerisen
- Langflog Glacier
- Langhovde Glacier
- Langskavlen Glacier
- Lunde Glacier
- Mefjell Glacier
- Mendeleyev Glacier
- Mjell Glacier
- Mushketov Glacier
- Nipe Glacier
- Nishi-naga-iwa Glacier
- Norsk Polarinstitutt Glacier
- Oberst Glacier
- Oku-iwa Glacier
- Omega Glacier
- Parizhskaya Kommuna Glacier
- Peter Glacier
- Rakuda Glacier
- Rogstad Glacier
- Sal Glacier
- Sandhøhallet Glacier
- Schytt Glacier
- Shinnan Glacier
- Shirase Glacier
- Sigyn Glacier
- Skålebreen
- Skallen Glacier
- Skarsbrotet Glacier
- Skarskvervet Glacier
- Snuggerud Glacier
- Stuttflog Glacier
- Svea Glacier
- Tama Glacier
- Telen Glacier
- Tønnesen Glacier
- Torii Glacier
- Tverregg Glacier
- Vangengeym Glacier
- Vestreskorve Glacier
- Veststraumen Glacier
- Vindegghallet Glacier
- Vinje Glacier
- Yamato Glacier
