= Wangenheim (disambiguation) =

Wangenheim is a municipality in the district of Gotha, in Thuringia, Germany.

Wangenheim may also refer to:

- Wangenheim (surname)
- Wangenheim family, German noble family
- Wangenheim Palace

== See also ==
- Wagenheim
- Wangenheimia, a genus of Mediterranean plants in the grass family
- Vangengeym Glacier, from the Russified form of the surname
