= Mushketov Glacier =

Mushketov Glacier refers to glaciers named after I. V. Mushketov:

- Mushketov Glacier (Antarctica), in Queen Maud Land. Antarctica
- Mushketov Glacier (Severnaya Zemlya) in Bolshevik Island, Severnaya Zemlya
