= Nipe (disambiguation) =

Nipe may refer to:

== Places ==
- Nipe, a village in Risør municipality in Aust-Agder county, Norway
- Nipe Bay, a bay on the northern coast of Cuba in Holguín Province
- Nipe-Sagua-Baracoa, a mountain range of eastern Cuba
- Nipe Formation, a geologic formation in Cuba
- Nipe Glacier, a broad glacier in the Sør-Rondane Mountains in Antarctica

== Other ==
- NIPE or Net income per employee, a company's net income or revenue divided by the number of employees
