= Mendeleyev (disambiguation) =

Dmitri Mendeleev (1834–1907) was a Russian chemist.

Mendeleyev (masculine) or Mendeleyeva (feminine or masculine genitive) may also refer to:

- Mendeleev (crater), a crater on the far side of the Moon
- Mendeleev Ridge, a ridge under the Arctic Ocean
- Mendeleevbreen, glacier in Svalbard
- Mendeleyev Glacier, a glacier in Antarctica
- Mendeleyeva, a stratovolcano in the Kuril Islands, Russia

== See also ==
- Mendeleyevo, several inhabited localities in Russia
- Mendeleyevsk, a town in the Republic of Tatarstan, Russia
- Mendeleyevsky (disambiguation)
