= Swithinbank =

Swithinbank may refer to:

== People ==
- Swithinbank (surname)

== Geography ==
- Swithinbank Slope an ice slope in the Kirwan Escarpment.
- Swithinbank Range, part of the Churchill Mountains.
- Swithinbank Glacier, glacier on the Hemimont Plateau.
- Swithinbank Moraine, medial moraine in the Shackleton Glacier.
