= Nashornkalvane Rocks =

Nashornkalvane Rocks (72°19′S 1°56′W) is a group of rocks 2 nautical miles (3.7 km) north of Nashornet Mountain, at the south side of the mouth of Viddalen Valley in Queen Maud Land. Mapped by Norwegian cartographers from surveys and air photos by Norwegian-British-Swedish Antarctic Expedition (NBSAE) (1949–52) and air photos by the Norwegian expedition (1958–59) and named Nashornkalvane (the rhinoceros' calves).
