= Alain Hubert =

Belgian explorer (born 1953)

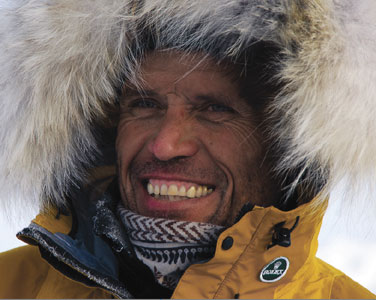
Alain Hubert

Alain Hubert (born September 11, 1953, in Schaerbeek) is a Belgian explorer. He is a certified mountain and polar guide, a civil engineer, and the founder President of the International Polar Foundation. With the Foundation and its private partners, he built and financed the construction of the scientific research station ‘Princess Elisabeth’. This station is the first ‘Zero Emissions’ station in Antarctica, designed under the spirit of the Madrid protocol system establishing in 1992 the strictest environmental rules to date for a continent through the Antarctic Treaty System.

== Biography ==
Alain Hubert obtained his Civil Engineering diploma from the University of Louvain (UCLouvain) in 1974. As an adolescent, he became an avid practitioner of outdoor sports: mountaineering, marathon, back-country ski and para-gliding.

Professionally, he founded a cooperative specialized in carpentry and joinery (CHERBAI) and established himself in the Belgian Ardennes. Alain Hubert has been going on major polar and mountaineering expeditions. His achievements include being the first Belgian to ever reach the North Pole in 1994 with Didier Goetghebuer, a world record crossing of the Antarctic continent (3924 km in 99 days) with Dixie Dansercoer in 1998 and five attempts at summiting Mount Everest. The Arctic Arc expedition with Dixie Dansercoer in 2007 was the First ever Siberia-Greenland crossing via the North Pole.

During his expeditions, Alain Hubert witnessed the pace and magnitude of climate change first hand and dedicated himself to that cause. He collaborates with scientists and collects ground data for them during his expeditions both in Antarctica and the Arctic (for example snow depth ground data for Cryosat during his Arctic Arc Expedition). He is the founders of the International Polar Foundation, with the scientists André Berger and Hugo Decleir. The International Polar Foundation supports polar scientific research and promotes informed action on climate change and the development of a sustainable society.

During the 2004-2005 and 2008-2009 BELARE Campaigns, the International Polar Foundation built the first-ever "Zero Emissions" Antarctic Research Station: Princess Elisabeth Antarctica. The project was initiated by Alain Hubert and funded by private partners and the Belgian government. Since 2009, he is with the International Polar Foundation the Head of Belgian Research Expedition at Princess Elisabeth Antarctica Station.

== Distinctions and awards ==
- 2003: "Georges Lemaître International Award" - for services to science, University of Louvain (UCLouvain), Belgium.
- 2003: "Grand Officier de l’Ordre de la Couronne", Belgium.
- 2005: "European Descartes Prize" Nominee – for excellence in science communication.
- 2008: "Climate Change Award" by the Prince Albert II de Monaco Foundation - for his clairvoyance and commitment towards climate change-related issues, Monaco.
- 2009: "Doctor honoris causa", University of Hasselt - for his general merits as explorer and scientist who encourages more care for environment in economic development, and in particular for his merits on disposal of the CO_{2} neutral Princess Elisabeth Station in Antarctica, Belgium.
- 2009: "Harvard Leadership Award" – for having provided a means to address climate change through an innovative and scientific approach, Belgium.
- 2015: "Geographical Award", Royal Geographical Society - for furthering the understanding of polar scientific research in Antarctica, UK.
- 2023: "Belgica Gold Medal", Royal Academy of Science, Letters and Fine Arts - in recognition of his exceptional contribution to research in the polar regions, in particular his record-breaking polar expeditions, the establishment of important scientific research programmes and the construction of the world's first Zero Emissions polar research station, the Princess Elisabeth Antarctica, Belgium.

== Publications and films ==
- "L’Enfer Blanc" - "De Witte Hel", North Pole Expedition, Éditions Labor, Brussels, 1994.
- "In the Teeth of the Wind, the Great Antarctic Crossing", Bluntisham Books, London, 2001.
- "Cent jours pour l’Antarctique, La grande traversée", Éditions Labor, Brussels, 1998 - "In de tand of de wind", Van Hallewyck, Leuven, 1998.
- "Chaos sur la Banquise", the book of the 2002 Arctic Expedition, Labor, Brussels, 2002 - "Chaos op het ijs", Van Hallewyck, Leuven, 2002
- "Deux pôles, Un rêve", Arthaud (Flammarion), Paris, 2004.
- "La décision, entre passion et raison" (with Jean Mossoux), De Boeck, Brussels, 2006.
- "L’Appel des glaces", Mardaga, Brussels, 2007.
- "antarctica.org", 1998, a documentary film (multilingual) on the Great Antarctic crossing, which won the Toison d’Or (first prize) at the Adventure Film Festival held in Dijon (France) in 1999, and the first prize of the Mountain Film Festival held in Trente (Italy) in 2001.
- "Chaos sur La Banquise", 2002, a documentary film (multilingual) of the attempt at the longest Arctic crossing.
- "The Testament of Ice", multilingual DVD pack on polar expeditions with several original bonus (film music, pictures, topics and video animation on the International Polar Foundation activities), Michel de Wouters productions, 2005.
- "Beyond Silence", 2008, documentary film (multilingual) on the first arctic crossing from Siberia to Greenland (the Arctic Arc expedition 2007), which won a "Special mention" and the "Toison d’Or de l’Aventurier de l’Année" at the Adventure Film festival in Dijon (France), 2008.
- "The Base", documentary film (multilingual) on the construction of the Princess Elisabeth Antarctica, the first zero-emission scientific station in Antarctica.
- "Princess Elisabeth Antarctica" – (with N. Amin as author), Racines / Lanoo, Brussels, 2012.

== Expeditions ==
=== Mountaineering expeditions ===
- Ama Dablam (6858 m) – First ascent of the East Ridge and first crossing (with André Georges), Nepal, 1983, and winter ascension of the Southwest face, Nepal, 1992.
- Kanchenjunga South (8491 m) – Attempt at a solo ascent of the Southwest face, Nepal, 1987.
- Cho Oyu (8201m) – Attempt at the winter ascent of the Southeast face, Nepal, 1989; Ascent of the North-west face (Polish route), Tibet, 1990.
- Everest (8846 m) – 1991, 1992, 1994, 1996 and 1999. Attempt at the ascension of the North face, Tibet (storm, altitude reached 7250m) -1991. South ridge, without oxygen, Nepal, (altitude reached 8450 m) -1992, 1994 and 1996. North Ridge without oxygen (altitude reached 8580m, climb stopped following fatalities in the group) - 1999.
- Gasherbrum I & II (8064m & 8130m), Pakistan, 2001, Attempt.
- Musthag Ata (7550m), China (Xingjang), 2003.
- Denali (6187m), Alaska, 2004.
- Aoraki / Mount Cook (3754m), solo ascent of the East face, New Zealand, 2004.
- Various climbs in the Himalayas, the Andes, Antarctica, Patagonia, Africa and Alaska, 1989–2015.

=== Arctic and Antarctic expeditions ===
- Geographic North Pole, Polar expedition – first Belgian (with Didier Goetghebuer) to ever reach the North Pole, 76 days on ski and in autonomy, 760 km, Arctic Ocean, 1994.
- Greenland, polar trek on ski and with kites, 620 km, 1995 and 1997.
- World record crossing of the Antarctic continent, 3924 km in 99 days in autonomy (with Dixie Dansercoer), Antarctica, 1997–1998. The longest crossing ever made on foot and ski, using innovative new power kites.
- Queen Maud Land, - First ever ascent of the south summit of Holtanna Peak and a dozen of other rock peaks. International expedition, Antarctica, 2000–2001.
- The Arctic - Compaq Pole II - an attempt at the longest crossing (over 2400 km) of the Arctic Ocean, in autonomy with Dixie Dansercoer, Arctic Ocean, 2002. The Expedition was forced to abandon after 68 days because of poor ice conditions.
- Mount Vinson (4897m), Antarctica, 2003.
- North Pole guiding treks - The last degree, Arctic Ocean, 10 expeditions from 2001 to 2014.
- Sør Rondane Mountains - first ascent of Mount Widerøe (2998m) and a dozen of other peaks, Antarctica, 2004–2014.
- The Arctic Arc - First-ever Siberia-Greenland crossing via the North Pole. 106 days on the ice, 1800 km (with Dixie Dansercoer), Arctic Ocean, 2007.
- Belgian Antarctic Expeditions (BELARE), Utsteinen, Antarctica, Expedition leader of all summer seasons since 2007.
