= Jutulpløgsla Crevasses =

Crevasse field in Antarctica

The Jutulpløgsla Crevasses (72°28′S 1°35′W) form a crevasse field halfway up Jutulstraumen Glacier, about 8 nautical miles (15 km) southeast of Nashornet Mountain, in Queen Maud Land, Antarctica. They were mapped by Norwegian cartographers from surveys and air photos by the Norwegian–British–Swedish Antarctic Expedition (1949–52) and from air photos by the Norwegian expedition (1958–59) and named Jutulpløgsla (the giant's plowed field).
