= Princess Elisabeth, Duchess of Brabant =

Heir apparent to the Belgian throne (born 2001)

Princess Elisabeth
- Duchess of Brabant
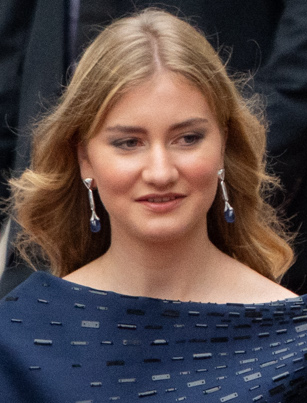
- Elisabeth in 2025
- Born: Princess Elisabeth of Belgium; 25 October 2001 (age 25); Erasmus Hospital, Anderlecht, Brussels-Capital Region, Belgium
Names
- French: Elisabeth Thérèse Marie Hélène de Saxe-Cobourg (Note: For almost a hundred years, official documents of the Belgian royal family members indicate "de Belgique/van België" as their surname. In January 2023, La Libre Belgique reported that members of the Belgian royal family were asked to go to the municipal administration to change their identity papers and write "de Saxe-Cobourg/van Saksen-Coburg" as their surname instead of the name "de Belgique/van België". In the same month, Het Laatste Nieuws reported that Elisabeth, as heir to the throne, will be exempted from this rule and continue to use "de Belgique/van België" as surname. However, in June 2024, Billed Bladet revealed that she uses the French version of the royal family's surname ("de Saxe-Cobourg") as her surname in her identity card.); Dutch: Elisabeth Theresia Maria Helena van Saksen-Coburg
- House: Belgium
- Father: Philippe
- Mother: Mathilde d'Udekem d'Acoz
- Education: St John Berchmans College; UWC Atlantic College; Lincoln College, Oxford (BA); Harvard Kennedy School (MPP)
- Military career
- Branch: Belgian Air Force; Belgian Army; Belgian Navy
- Service years: 2020–present
- Rank: Captain

Princess Elisabeth of Belgium, Duchess of Brabant (Note: French: Elisabeth Thérèse Marie Hélène de Saxe-Cobourg; Dutch: Elisabeth Theresia Maria Helena van Saksen-Coburg) (born 25 October 2001), is the heir apparent to the Belgian throne. The eldest child of King Philippe and Queen Mathilde, she was elevated to the dukedom after her grandfather Albert II abdicated on 21 July 2013. Should she ascend to the throne as expected, she will be Belgium's first-ever queen regnant.

== Birth ==
Elisabeth was born to Philippe and Mathilde, then the duke and duchess of Brabant. She was delivered by Caesarean section at 21:58 CET on 25 October 2001 at Erasmus Hospital, the teaching hospital of the Université libre de Bruxelles in Anderlecht, Brussels. She was christened on 9 December 2001 at Ciergnon Castle, a summer residence of the Belgian royal family, by Cardinal Godfried Danneels, then Archbishop of Mechelen-Brussels. Her godparents are Archduke Amedeo of Austria-Este (paternal cousin) and Countess Hélène d'Udekem d'Acoz (maternal aunt).

== Education and military training ==
Elisabeth was initially educated at St John Berchmans College, a Dutch-language school in the Marolles/Marollen, Brussels, from September 2004 until August 2018. This marked a significant change in Belgian royal tradition, being the first time that a future Belgian monarch's education has begun in Dutch. Elisabeth graduated from primary school in July 2013 with a 95% average on her report card. She contributed to the St John Berchmans College's newspaper under the name "Elisabeth van België". From August 2018, Elisabeth continued her secondary education at UWC Atlantic College in Llantwit Major, Wales under the name "Elisabeth de Brabant", receiving her International Baccalaureate diploma in May 2020. Elisabeth attended the Yale Young Global Scholars Program at Yale University. She also attended an introductory course at the Permanent Representation of Belgium to the United Nations in New York City.

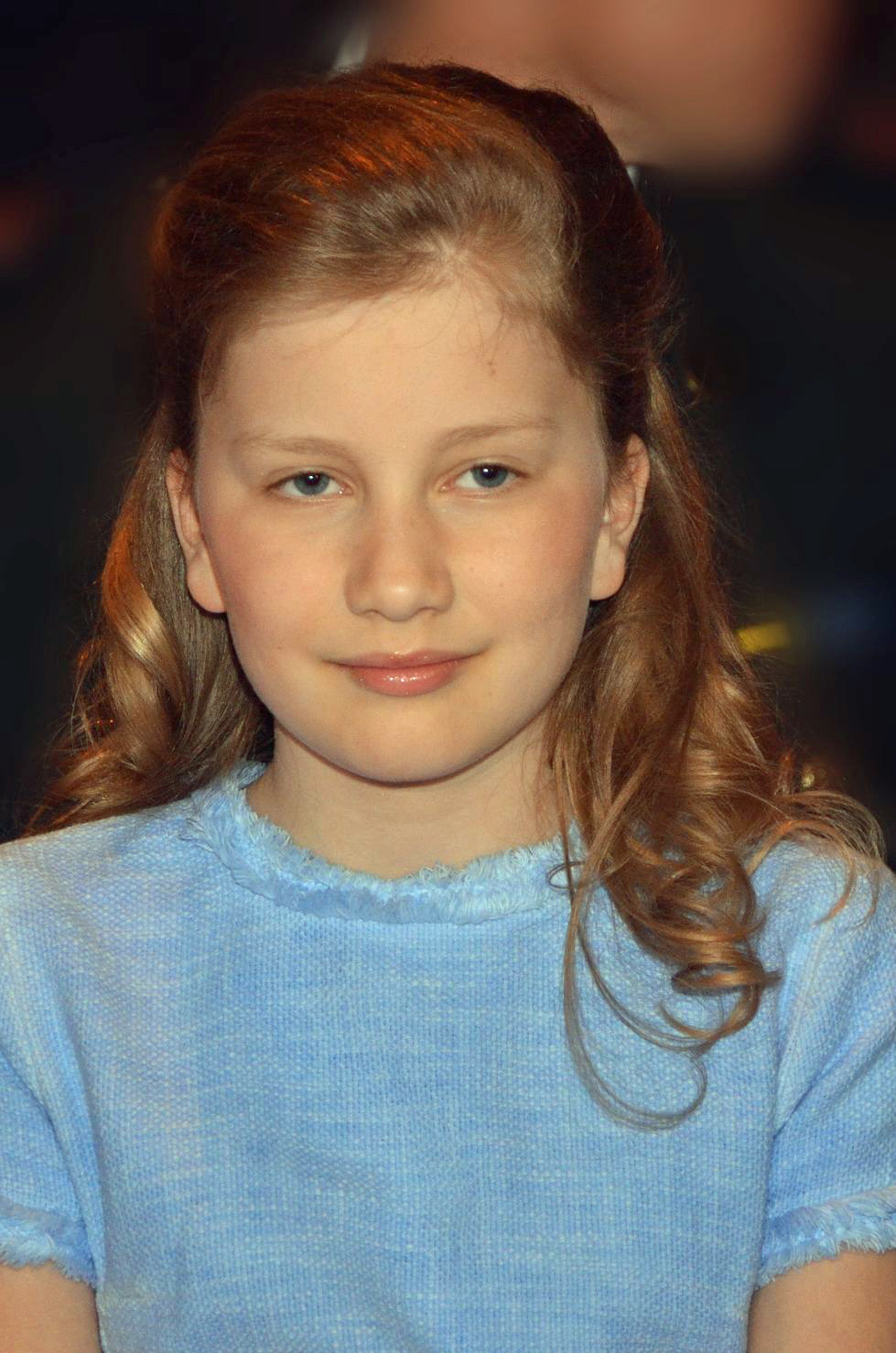
Elisabeth in 2014

In May 2020, the Belgian Royal Court announced that Elisabeth would undertake military training. On 31 August 2020, Elisabeth entered the Royal Military Academy in Brussels, studying social and military sciences. Among the 160th promotion, she received her blue beret in September 2020 and completed her one-year military training on 9 July 2021. Whilst attending the military academy, Elisabeth renounced any money that cadets receive and only obtained a certificate that she has completed the first year of training. For the next two years, she attended the Royal Military Academy's annual three-week summer camps and other practical and theoretical military classes. She swore the officers' oath on 26 September 2023 being commissioned as a second lieutenant in three branches of the Belgian Armed Forces. Elisabeth had one of the highest grades among her promotion.

Elisabeth went on to study history and politics at Lincoln College, Oxford, in October 2021. She obtained her Bachelor of Arts degree with upper second class honours in July 2024. Elisabeth rowed for Lincoln College Boat Club in Torpids, an Oxford rowing race, in February 2023 under the name "Elisabeth de Saxe-Cobourg". In May 2024, the Belgian Royal Court announced that Elisabeth was admitted into Harvard Kennedy School to study for a two-year master's degree in public policy. She was also selected for an Honorary Award from the Fulbright program. Elisabeth began her studies at Harvard in September 2024. As she finished her first year, her ability to continue at the Harvard Kennedy School was possibly jeopardised under the Trump administration ban on foreign students. As of 18 August 2025 she obtained a visa to study; she did say prior to this she did not want to use her status as she understood the situation of her international classmates who were in the same position. In July 2025, Elisabeth completed a seven-week internship with Bruegel, an independent research centre in Brussels that specialises in European economic policy. On 28 May 2026, she graduated from Harvard.

Elisabeth speaks Dutch, French, German and English, and has also taken classes in Mandarin Chinese.

== Public appearances and duties ==
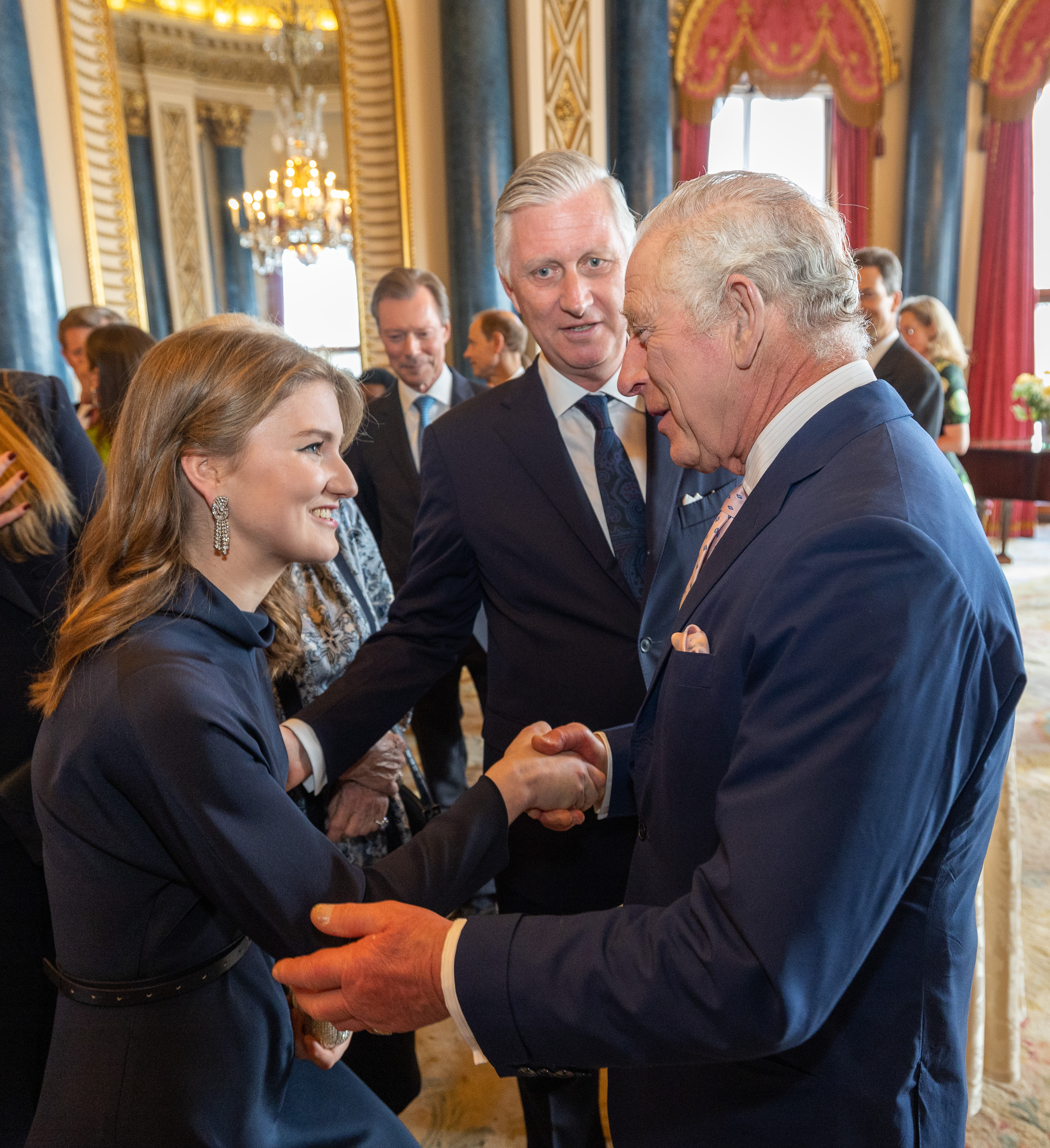
Elisabeth meets King Charles III at a reception at Buckingham Palace, the evening before his coronation, 5 May 2023. Watching on is her father King Philippe

Elisabeth's first public appearance was on 21 July 2006, when she accompanied her parents during the Te Deum for National Day celebrations at the Cathedral of St. Michael and St. Gudula. The following year, on 13 June 2007, Elisabeth and her parents attended the opening of a new Technopolis youth interactive at Mechelen. In February 2009, Elisabeth gave her name to a Belgian scientific polar research station. She and her father also recorded a video message to support Belgian scientists in Antarctica. In September 2011, Elisabeth gave her first public speech in Dutch at the opening of the Princess Elisabeth Children's Hospital, part of Ghent University Hospital. She gave her first self-written speech on 17 October 2014 during commemorations of the centenary of the outbreak of World War I at Nieuwpoort. Elisabeth read the prayer intentions at her great-aunt Queen Fabiola's funeral in December 2014. She christened the patrol vessel Pollux P902 on 6 May 2015 in Zeebrugge. In April 2019, Elisabeth joined her father King Philippe on a visit to the training center of the Brussels firefighters. She attended the funeral of Grand Duke Jean of Luxembourg in May 2019. In June 2019, Elisabeth and her mother traveled to Kenya on behalf of the United Nations Children's Fund and visited the Kakuma refugee camp.

During the COVID-19 pandemic, Elisabeth held conversations over the phone with elderly people in residential care centers in order to give them encouragement and support. On 21 July 2021, she joined fellow students of the Royal Military Academy of Belgium to parade during Belgian National Day. In March 2022, Elisabeth and her parents attended a roundtable discussion about the ramifications of the Russian invasion of Ukraine. On 12 May 2022, Elisabeth accompanied her aunt Princess Astrid on a visit to St Hilda's College, Oxford. There, she and her aunt met St Hilda's Principal Professor Dame Sarah Springman and the Vice-Chancellor of Oxford University Professor Dame Louise Richardson. On 17 June 2022, together with her mother Queen Mathilde, she was among the royal guests invited to the celebrations of the 18th birthday of Princess Ingrid Alexandra of Norway. Elisabeth carried her two first solo official engagements in the following week by christening the Belgian oceanographic research vessel RV Belgica and inaugurating KU Leuven's Princess Elisabeth Additive Manufacturing Lab. In December 2022, Elisabeth and her brother Prince Emmanuel participated in the Warmathon in Brussels.

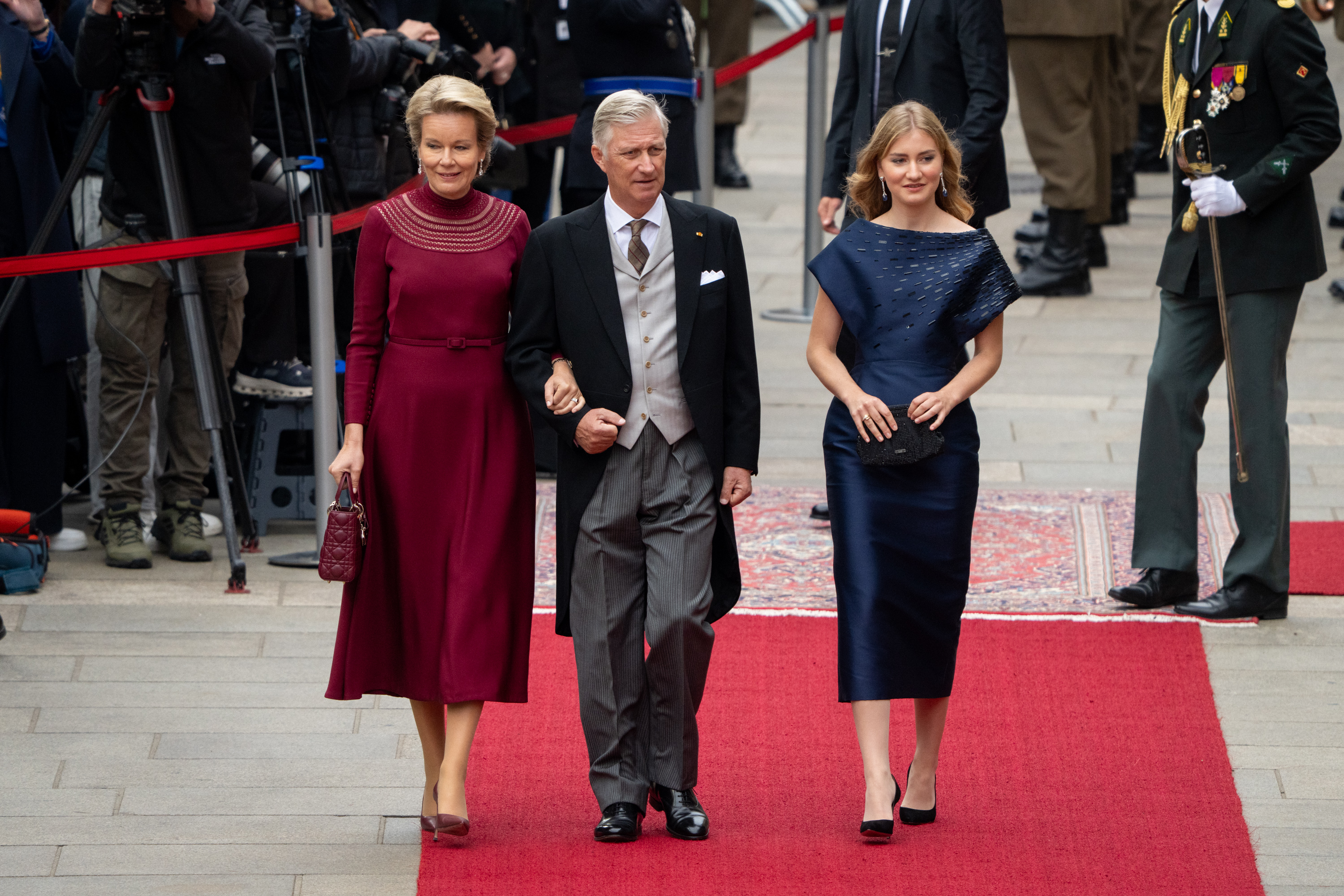
Elisabeth with her parents at the enthronement of Guillaume V, Grand Duke of Luxembourg, 3 October 2025

In March 2023, Elisabeth and her mother Queen Mathilde traveled to Egypt, where they visited archaeological sites. On 5 May 2023, Elisabeth accompanied her father to a reception at Buckingham Palace the evening before the coronation of King Charles III and Queen Camilla of the United Kingdom. In June 2023, she and her father attended the wedding of Crown Prince Hussein of Jordan and Rajwa Al Saif. Elisabeth carried her first solo official trip abroad in October 2023 by attending Prince Christian of Denmark's 18th birthday celebration banquet at Christiansborg Palace, Denmark. In March 2024, she and her father King Philippe received the former U.S. President Barack Obama at the Castle of Laeken. In June 2024, Elisabeth and her siblings voted for the regional, federal and European elections. In October 2025, Elisabeth accompanied her parents to events surrounding the abdication of Henri, Grand Duke of Luxembourg, and the enthronement of his son Guillaume V.

In 2020 it was reported that Elisabeth volunteered to help children with learning difficulties, the elderly, the homeless and disabled people.

== Position ==
Ten years prior to Elisabeth's birth, a new 1991 amendment of the succession line was implemented which introduced absolute primogeniture, defining her as the first in the line of succession since she is the eldest child. On 21 July 2013, once Elisabeth's father had sworn the oath of office as King (her grandfather having abdicated shortly before), she became heir apparent to the throne, receiving the title of Duchess of Brabant. Should she ascend as expected, Elisabeth will become Belgium's first female monarch.

== Titles, styles, honours and arms ==
Elisabeth's monogram

=== Titles and styles ===
- 25 October 2001 – 21 July 2013: Her Royal Highness Princess Elisabeth of Belgium
- 21 July 2013 – present: Her Royal Highness Princess Elisabeth, Duchess of Brabant

=== Military ranks ===
Belgian Army

- 25 September 2020 – 26 September 2023: Officer Cadet
- 26 September 2023 – 21 July 2026: Second Lieutenant
- 21 July 2026 – present: Captain

Belgian Air Force

- 26 September 2023 – 21 July 2026: Second Lieutenant
- 21 July 2026 – present: Captain

Belgian Navy

- 26 September 2023 – 21 July 2026: Second Lieutenant
- 21 July 2026 – present: Lieutenant at Sea

=== Honours ===
==== National ====
- Belgium: Grand Cordon of the Order of Leopold (25 October 2019)

==== Foreign ====
- Japan: Grand Cordon of the Order of the Chrysanthemum (23 June 2026)

=== Honorific eponyms ===
==== Structures ====
- Antarctica: Princess Elisabeth Antarctica Station in Utsteinen Nunatak, Queen Maud Land.
- Belgium: Princess Elisabeth Children's Hospital, Ghent University Hospital in Ghent, East Flanders.
- Belgium: Princess Elisabeth Street in Malle, Antwerp Province.
- Belgium: Crown Princess Elisabeth Street in Boortmeerbeek, Flemish Brabant.
- Belgium: Duchess of Brabant Square in Boortmeerbeek, Flemish Brabant.
- Belgium: Princess Elisabeth Additive Manufacturing Lab, Katholieke Universiteit Leuven in Leuven, Flemish Brabant.
- Belgium: Athénée Royal Princesse Elisabeth in Aywaille, Liège Province.

==== Geographic locations ====
- Belgium: Princess Elisabeth Island in the offshore of Ostend, West Flanders.

==== Species ====
- Microcostatus elisabethianus, a species of diatom.

=== Arms ===
Coat of arms of Princess Elisabeth, Duchess of Brabant
Notes As Duchess of Brabant the Princess displays the coat of arms granted by Royal Decree of King Philippe in 2019. Adopted 12 July 2019 Coronet Coronet of a Princess of Belgium Escutcheon On a lozenge, Sable a Lion rampant Or armed and langued Gules (Belgium), on the shoulder an Escutcheon barry of ten Sable and Or a Crancelin Vert (Wettin), overall a Label of three points Or. Supporters Two Lions guardant Proper each supporting a Lance Or with the Banner of the Duchy of Brabant. Motto French: L'union fait la force Dutch: Eendracht maakt macht German: Einigkeit macht stark Other elements Behind the Arms a Mantle Purpure lined Ermine fringed and tasseled Or, surmounted by the Belgian Royal Crown.

== See also ==
- List of current heirs apparent

== Footnotes ==
Princess Elisabeth, Duchess of Brabant House of Saxe-Coburg and Gotha Born: 25 October 2001
Lines of succession
First Heir apparent	Succession to the Belgian throne 1st in line	Succeeded by Prince Gabriel
Belgian royalty
Preceded by Philippe	Duchess of Brabant; 2013–present	Incumbent
