= Ellis Glacier =

Glacier in Antarctica

- Location of Queen Maud Land in Antarctica

- Location within Antarctica
- Location: Queen Maud Land
- Coordinates: 71°58′S 24°17′E
- Thickness: unknown
- Terminus: Sør Rondane Mountains
- Status: unknown

Ellis Glacier (71°58′S 24°17′E) is a glacier, 4 nautical miles (7 km) long, flowing north from Mount Walnum between Gillock Glacier and Jennings Glacier in the Sør Rondane Mountains of Antarctica. It was mapped by Norwegian cartographers in 1957 from air photos taken by U.S. Navy Operation Highjump, 1946–47, and named for Edwin E. Ellis, aerial photographer on Operation Highjump photographic flights in this area and other coastal areas between 14°E and 164°E.

== See also ==
- List of glaciers in the Antarctic
- Glaciology
