= Turkestanskie vedomosti =

Newspaper published in Tashkent (1870–1917)

Turkestanskiye vedomosti
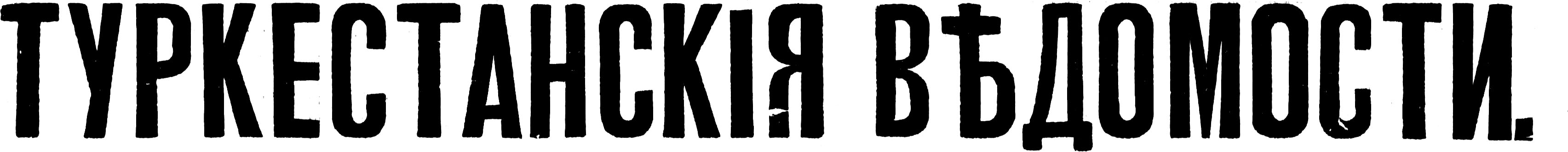

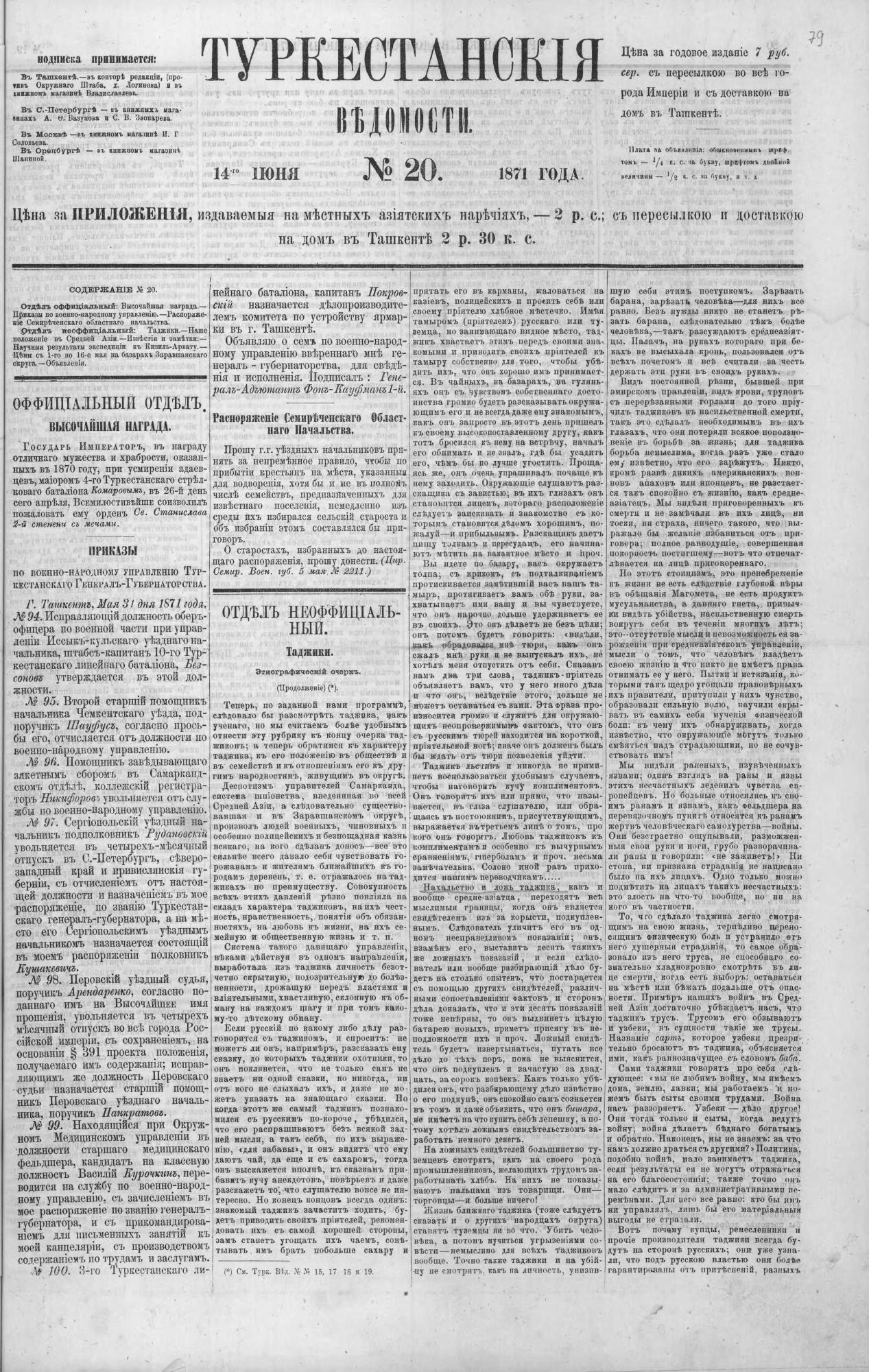
- Title page of Turkestanskiye vedomosti No. 20 (14/26 June 1871)
- Native name: Туркестанские ведомости
- Type: Weekly (twice weekly from 1893; three times a week from December 1903; four times a week from March 1904; daily from July 1907)
- Publisher: Chancellery of the Turkestan Governor-Generalship
- Founded: 28 April (O.S.) / 10 May 1870 (N.S.)
- Ceased publication: December 1917
- Language: Russian; with supplements in Kazakh and Uzbek
- Headquarters: Tashkent

Turkestanskiye vedomosti (Туркестанские ведомости, lit. Turkestan Gazette) was the first Russian-language newspaper published in Russian Turkestan, appearing in Tashkent from 1870 to 1917. As the official organ of the Turkestan Governor-Generalship, it played a central role in disseminating administrative orders and information about Central Asia to both local administrators and the broader Russian public. The newspaper evolved from a weekly to a daily by 1907 and carried regular supplements in Kazakh and Uzbek, making it an important multilingual outlet in colonial Central Asia.

The newspaper served dual functions as both an official gazette publishing ordinances and a vehicle for scholarly and practical information on the newly incorporated region. It featured contributions from prominent researchers and explorers, including Vasily Bartold, Lev Berg, Ivan Mushketov and Nikolai Severtzov, who documented the krai’s geography, natural history and ethnography. Estimates place circulation broadly between 1,000 and 2,500 copies.

== History ==
=== Foundation and early years (1870–1890) ===
Following the capture of Tashkent in 1865 and the establishment of the Turkestan Governor-Generalship in 1867, the authorities launched a newspaper to promulgate military–administrative orders and to disseminate information about the newly annexed territory. The first issue of Turkestanskiye vedomosti appeared on 28 April (O.S.) / 10 May 1870 (N.S.) under the editorship of Staff Captain Nikolay A. Mayev. From the outset the paper was structured in two sections: an official section for government orders, circulars and announcements, and a non-official section containing reports, essays and studies on the region's history, geography, economy and ethnography—mirroring the dual model of provincial gubernskie vedomosti.

From 1870 to 1882 the Russian-language edition carried a supplement titled Turkeston viloyatining gazeti (Arabic script: ترکستان ولایتینینگ گزیتی, “Turkestan Regional Newspaper”), published alternately in “Kirghiz” (Kazakh) and “Sart” (Uzbek). These supplements provided translations of key administrative announcements and original content for indigenous audiences. In 1883 the supplements became an independent Uzbek-language weekly; from 1887 its Russian title was Turkestanskaya tuzemnaya gazeta ("Turkestan Native Newspaper").

=== Development and expansion (1890–1907) ===
The 1890s marked a period of expansion. In 1893 publication frequency increased from weekly to twice weekly; from December 1903 the paper appeared three times a week, from March 1904 four times a week, and from July 1907 it became a daily. The paper attracted contributions from leading scholars of Central Asia. The twenty-fifth anniversary in 1896 was marked by a commemorative issue outlining the journal’s role in advancing knowledge of the region. Turkestanskiye vedomosti was also monitored by military strategists and diplomatic observers for developments in neighbouring Afghanistan and Chinese Xinjiang.

=== Final years and closure (1907–1917) ===
As a daily from 1907, the paper reflected the growing complexity of governing Russian Turkestan amid political upheaval. The proportion of official material increased markedly, though the non-official section continued to publish scholarly articles and regional reporting. The newspaper operated through the First World War and the February Revolution; Fyodor I. Kolesov served as the final editor. Publication ceased in December 1917 with the collapse of the Governor-Generalship's administrative apparatus.

== Content and editorial policy ==
=== Structure and sections ===
Throughout its 47-year run the paper maintained an official / non-official dual structure. The official section published decrees, orders and circulars of the Governor-General’s chancellery, tender notices and statistics; the non-official section featured:

- historical and archaeological studies of Central Asia;
- geographic surveys and expedition reports;
- economic analyses of agriculture, trade and industry;
- ethnographic studies of local populations;
- reports on public health and education; and
- news from other parts of the Russian Empire and international developments.

=== Notable contributors ===
Regular and occasional contributors included V. V. Bartold (history), L. S. Berg (geography), I. V. Mushketov (geology), N. A. Severtzov (natural history), A. P. Fedchenko (natural history), V. F. Oshanin (entomology) and S. K. Glinka-Yanchevsky (military affairs).

=== Native-language editions ===
The Kazakh- and Uzbek-language supplements initially appeared as integral parts of the Russian edition (1870–1882), alternating by language. After their separation in 1883, the Uzbek-language weekly continued under Russian administrative oversight, and from 1887 was titled Turkestanskaya tuzemnaya gazeta.

== Administration and censorship ==
As the official organ of the Governor-Generalship, Turkestanskiye vedomosti operated under imperial press statutes with prior and post-publication oversight by the administration. This status distinguished it from private newspapers that emerged in Turkestan in the early twentieth century and which faced fines and temporary suspensions.

== Circulation and finance ==
Circulation fluctuated from the late nineteenth to the early twentieth century; later syntheses place it broadly in the 1,000–2,500 copy range by the 1900s. Revenue derived from the paper's official status (budgetary support and mandatory subscriptions by administrative bodies), paid notices and commercial advertisements, and official tender announcements.

== Legacy and digitisation ==
Turkestanskiye vedomosti remains a key primary source on Russian colonial administration, regional history and the development of print culture in Central Asia. Digitised runs and catalogue records are held by the Russian National Library and accessible via the National Electronic Library (NEB) under the persistent identifier 000200_000018_RU_NLR_DRGNLR_5108. Holdings include the Russian-language editions and surviving copies of native-language supplements.

== List of editors ==
- Nikolay Aleksandrovich Mayev — first editor (from 1869), staff captain who launched the newspaper
- Mikhail Vladimirovich Grulyov — developed the publication into a more frequent and informative edition
- Apolloniy Pavlovich Romanovich — 1892–1899, naval officer and researcher
- Sergey Aleksandrovich Geppener — acting editor, 1899–1901, captain with orientalist education
- Nikolay Guryevich Mallitskiy — 1901–1906, historian and philologist
- Mikhail Venyaminovich Levin — 1909–1914
- Ivan Dionisyevich Yagello — acting editor, July 1913, colonel and orientalist, head of Pamir detachment
- Aleksandr Yakovlevich Skvortsov — 1914–1917
- Fyodor Ivanovich Kolesov — 1917, final editor, Bolshevik revolutionary and Chairman of the Council of People's Commissars of Turkestan ASSR

== See also ==
- Turkistan Viloyatining Gazeti
- Turkestanskaya tuzemnaya gazeta
- Turkestan Governor-Generalship
- Russian Turkestan
- Mass media in the Russian Empire
