= Hålisen Glacier =

Glacier in Antarctica

- Location of Queen Maud Land in Antarctica

- Location within Antarctica
- Type: cirque glacier
- Location: Queen Maud Land
- Coordinates: 72°2′S 8°51′E
- Thickness: unknown
- Terminus: Kurze Mountains
- Status: unknown

Hålisen Glacier (72°2′S 8°51′E) is a cirque glacier between Halisstonga Peak and Halisrimen Peak in the Kurze Mountains of Queen Maud Land, Antarctica. It was mapped by Norwegian cartographers from surveys and air photos by the Sixth Norwegian Antarctic Expedition (1956–1960) and named Hålisen (the slippery ice).

== See also ==
- List of glaciers in the Antarctic
- Glaciology
