= Asimut Glacier =

Glacier in Antarctica

Asimutbreen Glacier
- Location of Queen Maud Land in Antarctica

- Location within Antarctica
- Type: steep tributary
- Location: Queen Maud Land
- Coordinates: 71°23′S 13°42′E
- Thickness: unknown
- Terminus: Vangengeym Glacier
- Status: unknown

Asimutbreen Glacier (71°23′S 13°42′E) is a small, steep tributary glacier to Vangengeym Glacier, descending southeast and then northeast between Solhogdene Heights and Skuggekammen Ridge, in the eastern Gruber Mountains of the Wohlthat Mountains, Queen Maud Land. It was discovered and plotted from air photos by the Third German Antarctic Expedition, 1938–39, replotted from air photos and from surveys by the Sixth Norwegian Antarctic Expedition, 1956–60, and named Asimutbreen (the azimuth glacier).

== See also ==
- List of glaciers in the Antarctic
- Glaciology
