= Muskegbukta =

Bay of Antarctica

Coordinates: 70°00′04″S 01°25′12″W

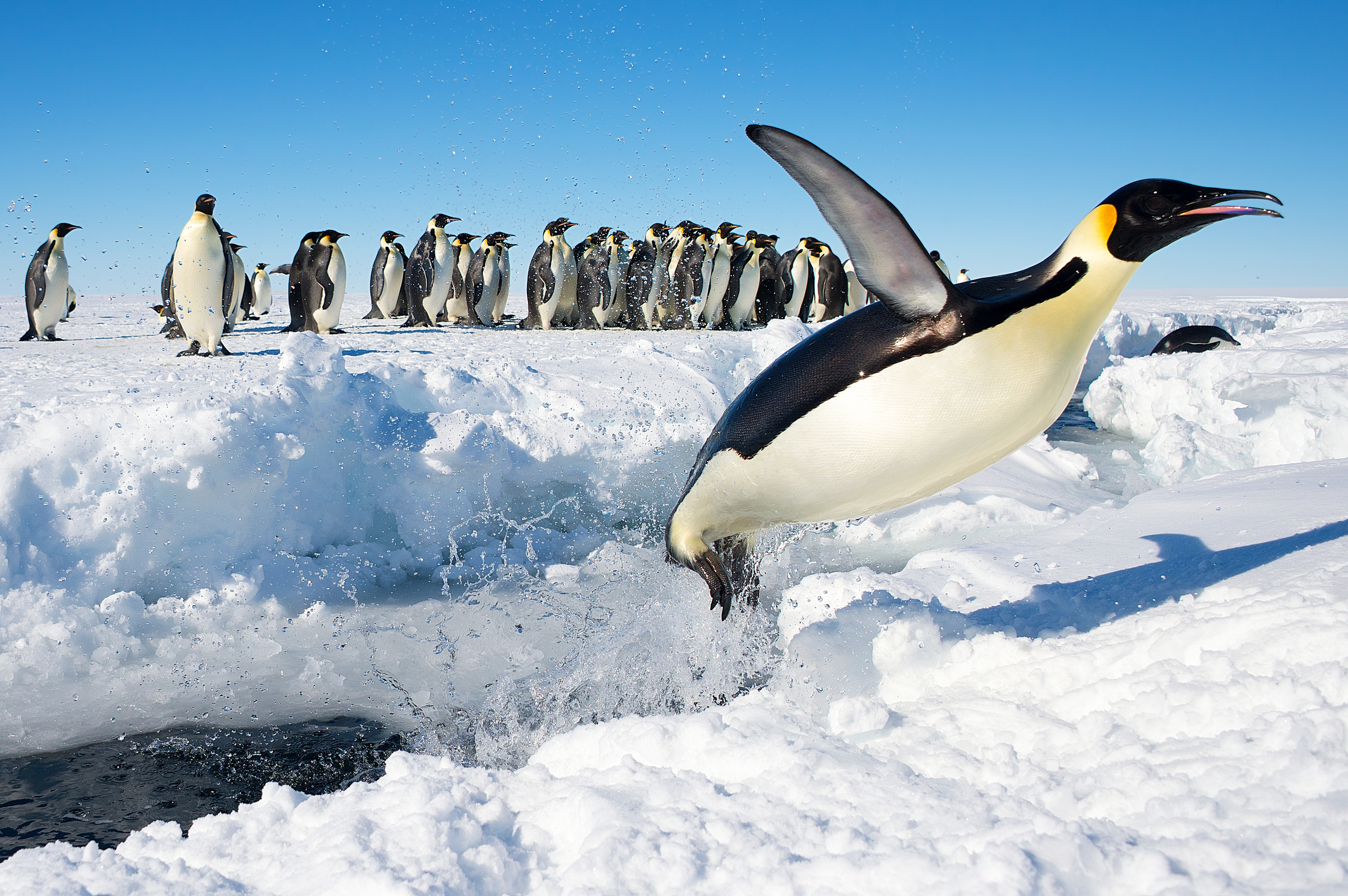
Emperor penguins breed in the IBA

Muskegbukta is a small bay on the west of the Fimbul Ice Shelf, on the Princess Martha Coast of Queen Maud Land, Antarctica.

== Important Bird Area ==
A 431 ha site on fast ice that forms in cracks along the western coast of the ice shelf has been designated an Important Bird Area (IBA) by BirdLife International because it supports a colony of some 3,000 emperor penguins, based on 2009 satellite imagery.
