= Horteflaket Névé =

Horteflaket Névé (71°56′S 12°45′E) is a névé at the head of Mushketov Glacier, between the Petermann Ranges and the Weyprecht Mountains in Queen Maud Land, Antarctica. First plotted from air photos by the Third German Antarctic Expedition, 1938–39, it was replotted from air photos and surveys by the Sixth Norwegian Antarctic Expedition, 1956–60, and named by them.
