= Nupsskarvet Mountain =

Mountain in Queen Maud Land, Antarctica

Nupsskarvet Mountain (71°56′S 8°52′E) is a broad mountain at the north side of Halisrimen Peak in the Kurze Mountains of Queen Maud Land. Mapped from surveys and air photos by Norwegian Antarctic Expedition (1956–60) and named Nupsskarvet.

== See also ==
- Lokehellene Cliffs, steep rock cliffs which form the west side of Nupsskarvet Mountain
- Nupsskåka Valley, an ice-filled valley at the southwest side of Nupsskarvet Mountain
