= Kiletangen Ice Tongue =

Ice shelf projection in Antarctica

Kiletangen Ice Tongue (69°57′S 26°25′E) is a narrow projection of the ice shelf on the east side of Tangekilen Bay, along the coast of Queen Maud Land, Antarctica. It was first mapped by Norwegian cartographers from aerial photographs taken by the Lars Christensen Expedition, 1936–37, and named Kiletangen (the bay tongue).
