= Mefjell Glacier =

Glacier in Antarctica

- Location of Queen Maud Land in Antarctica

- Location within Antarctica
- Location: Queen Maud Land
- Coordinates: 71°58′S 25°00′E
- Length: 5 nmi (9 km; 6 mi)
- Thickness: unknown
- Terminus: Gjel Glacier
- Status: unknown

Mefjell Glacier (71°58′S 25°0′E) is a glacier, 5 nautical miles (9 km) long, flowing northwest into Gjel Glacier between Menipa Peak and Mefjell Mountain in the Sør Rondane Mountains of Antarctica. It was mapped by Norwegian cartographers in 1957 from air photos taken by U.S. Navy Operation Highjump, 1946–47, and named Mefjellbreen (the middle-mountain glacier).

== See also ==
- List of glaciers in the Antarctic
- Glaciology
