= Nupsskåka Valley =

Valley in Queen Maud Land, Antarctica

Nupsskåka Valley (71°58′S 8°48′E) is an ice-filled valley at the southwest side of Nupsskarvet Mountain in the Kurze Mountains of Queen Maud Land. Mapped from surveys and air photos by Norwegian Antarctic Expedition (1956–60) and named Nupsskåka (the peak shaft).
