= Oku-iwa Rock =

Oku-iwa Rock (68°42′S 40°50′E) is a substantial rock exposure just east of Oku-iwa Glacier on the coast of Queen Maud Land. Mapped from surveys and air photos by Japanese Antarctic Research Expedition (JARE), 1957–62, and named Oku-iwa (interior rock). The name presumably suggests the interior position of the rock with respect to the minor recession of the coast along which the rock is located.
