= Kråsen Crevasse Field =

Crevasse field in Queen Maud Land, Antarctica

Kråsen Crevasse Field (71°48′S 0°58′W) is a crevasse field about 15 nautical miles (30 km) long in the lower part of Jutulstraumen Glacier, in Queen Maud Land, Antarctica. It was mapped by Norwegian cartographers from surveys and air photos by the Norwegian–British–Swedish Antarctic Expedition (1949–52) and air photos by the Norwegian expedition (1958–59) and named Kråsen (the crop).
