= Brekilen Bay =

Bay in Antarctica

Brekilen Bay (70°8′S 25°48′E) is an indentation in the ice shelf about 10 nautical miles (20 km) southwest of Tangekilen Bay, along the coast of Queen Maud Land. It was mapped by Norwegian cartographers from air photos taken by the Lars Christensen Expedition, 1936–37, and named "Brekilen" (the "glacier bay").
