= Ulendet Crevasses =

Crevasse field in Antarctica

Coordinates: 72°51′S 0°59′W

Ulendet Crevasses is a crevasse field about 7 miles (11 km) long in the Jutulstraumen Glacier, about 15 miles (24 km) northeast of Neumayer Cliffs in Queen Maud Land. Mapped by Norwegian cartographers from surveys and air photos by the Norwegian-British-Swedish Antarctic Expedition (NBSAE) (1949–1952), led by John Schjelderup Giæver and air photos by the Norwegian expedition (1958–59) and named Ulendet (the rough ground).
