= Mount Romnaes =

Mountain in Queen Maud Land, Antarctica

Mount Romnaes (71°31′S 24°0′E) is a prominent isolated mountain in Antarctica. It rises to 1,500 m, standing 22 miles (35 km) northwest of Brattnipane Peaks and the main group of the Sor Rondane Mountains.

The mountain was mapped by Norwegian cartographers in 1946 from air photos taken by the Lars Christensen Expedition of 1936 - 37, and is named for Nils Romnaes, aerial photographer with this expedition.
