= Dixie Dansercoer =

Belgian explorer (1962–2021)

Dirk "Dixie" Dansercoer (12 July 1962 – 7 June 2021) was a Belgian explorer, endurance athlete and photographer. He held records or won prizes for high altitude mountain biking, windsurfing, ultramarathon running, and expedition filmmaking.

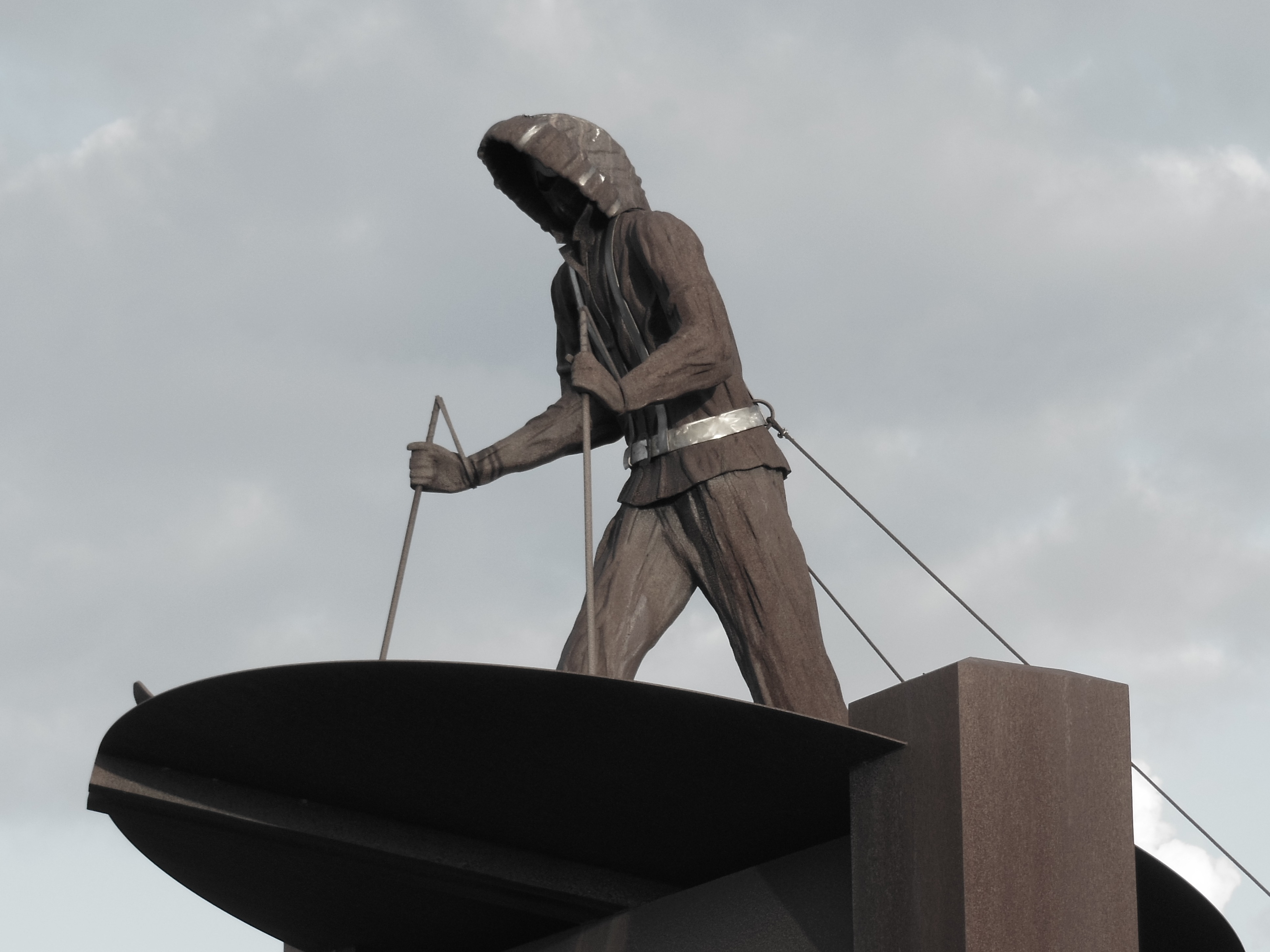
The arctic explorer. Monument by Freddy Cappon in Nieuwpoort, Belgium.

== Biography ==
- In 1980, as a student, Dansercoer spent a year in Moscow, Idaho, United States with AFS Intercultural Programs where he got his Dixie nickname.
- He was a graduated translator-interpreter.
- He served for 13 years as an air Steward with Sabena, the Belgian airlines.
- As a prize-winner he flew to Alain Hubert basecamp and befriended him.
- In 1997–98, he made a record-breaking crossing of Antarctica with Alain Hubert.
- In 2006, the European Space Agency commissioned him and Hubert to measure snow cover in the Arctic to calibrate measurements taken with the CryoSat 2 satellite. The two left Arctic Cape, Siberia on 1 March 2007. They reached the North Pole after 55 days and Greenland in another 51 days, the first time anyone had walked from Siberia to Greenland.
- In 2008, he led the 'In the wake of the Belgica expedition', a re-enactment of the de Gerlache expedition.
- In 2011–12 he ski-kited with Sam Deltour on the Antarctic ice cap on a pioneering 5,013 kilometres (3,115 mi) circular trajectory.
- In 2014, Dansercoer and Eric McNair-Landry completed the first full circumnavigation on the Greenland ice cap with 4,040 kilometres (2,510 mi) as final distance. During all of his expeditions parallel scientific missions were executed.

He provided polar guiding services through his companies Polar Circles and Polar Experience, with trips to both the Arctic polar regions and Antarctica.

Dixie Dansercoer co-founded in 2011 with a few explorers a travel agency.

Together with ultra-runners he also co-founded 'Polar Running Expeditions' in 2018, a new type of fast-paced polar expeditions.

Dansercoer was a father of four. One of his children was born in 2002 while he was away on the Ultimate Arctic Crossing.

== Death ==
Dansercoer died on 7 June 2021 during an expedition in Greenland at the age of 58. He went missing after falling into a glacier gorge. It is unclear if his body can be recovered. A search and rescue team descended into the crevasse and located his sled at a depth of 25 m, but was unable to find him after descending a further 15 m. No further rescue attempts were undertaken. Dansercoer recorded in his last journal entry at 443 km of the destination Qaanaaq "nice temperatures, terrain wonderful and perfect visibility". According to his partner Sebastien Audy, Dansercoer was manhauling the sled when the accident occurred and aware that the duo had strayed into a crevasse zone.
