= Peter Glacier =

Glacier in Antarctica

- Location of Queen Maud Land in Antarctica

- Location within Antarctica
- Location: Queen Maud Land
- Coordinates: 73°20′S 1°9′E
- Thickness: unknown
- Terminus: Jutulstraumen Glacier
- Status: unknown

Peter Glacier (73°20′S 1°9′W) is a short, broad glacier draining northeast into Jutulstraumen Glacier just east of Neumayer Cliffs and Melleby Peak in Queen Maud Land. Mapped by Norwegian cartographers from surveys and air photos by Norwegian-British-Swedish Antarctic Expedition (NBSAE) (1949–52) and air photos by the Norwegian expedition (1958–59). Named for Peter Melleby who was in charge of sledge dogs with the NBSAE.

== See also ==
- List of glaciers in the Antarctic
- Glaciology
- Skarvhalsen Saddle
