= Ellis Fjord =

Fjord in Antarctica

Ellis Fjord (68°36′S 78°5′E) is a long narrow fjord between Breidnes Peninsula and Mule Peninsula in the Vestfold Hills of Antarctica. It was photographed by the Lars Christensen Expedition (1936–37), and plotted by Norwegian cartographers as a bay and a remnant lake which were called "Mulvik" (snout bay) and "Langevatnet" (long lake) respectively. Analysis by John Roscoe of air photos taken by U.S. Navy Operation Highjump (1946–47) showed these two features to be connected. The feature was renamed Ellis Fjord by Roscoe after Edwin E. Ellis, aerial photographer on U.S. Navy Operation Highjump flights over this area.
