= Higashi-naga-iwa Glacier =

Glacier in Antarctica

- Location of Queen Maud Land in Antarctica

- Location within Antarctica
- Location: Queen Maud Land
- Coordinates: 68°27′S 41°38′E
- Thickness: unknown
- Status: unknown

Higashi-naga-iwa Glacier (68°27′S 41°38′E) is a wide glacier flowing to the sea at the eastern side of Naga-iwa Rock in Queen Maud Land, Antarctica. It was mapped from surveys and air photos by the Japanese Antarctic Research Expedition, 1957–62, and, in association with nearby Naga-iwa Rock, named "Higashi-naga-iwa-hyoga" (eastern long rock glacier).

== See also ==
- List of glaciers in the Antarctic
- Glaciology
