= Ko-iwa Rock =

Rock exposure on the coast of Antarctica

Ko-iwa Rock (68°42′S 40°33′E) is a small rock exposure 3.5 nautical miles (6 km) west of Oku-iwa Glacier on the coast of Queen Maud Land, Antarctica. It was mapped from surveys and air photos by the Japanese Antarctic Research Expedition, 1957–62, and given the name "Ko-iwa", which means "small rock" in Japanese.
