= Skarvhalsen Saddle =

Skarvhalsen Saddle (73°20′S 1°39′W) is an ice saddle just south of Neumayer Cliffs, between Peter Glacier and Swithinbank Slope, in Queen Maud Land. Mapped by Norwegian cartographers from surveys and air photos by Norwegian-British-Swedish Antarctic Expedition (NBSAE) (1949–52) and air photos by the Norwegian expedition (1958–59) and named Skarvhalsen (the barren mountain neck).
