= Tangekilen Bay =

Bay in Antarctica

Tangekilen Bay (69°58′S 26°20′E) is an indentation of the ice shelf northward of the Sor Rondane Mountains and 42 nautical miles (80 km) east-northeast of Breid Bay, along the coast of Queen Maud Land. First mapped by Norwegian cartographers from air photos taken by the Lars Christensen Expedition, 1936–37, and named Tangekilen (the tongue bay) after the large ice tongue just eastward.

Brekilen Bay is located about 10 nautical miles (20 km) southwest of Tangekilen Bay.

== See also ==
- Kiletangen Ice Tongue
