= Entuziasty Glacier =

Glacier in Antarctica

- Location of Queen Maud Land in Antarctica

- Location within Antarctica
- Type: broad outlet
- Location: Queen Maud Land
- Coordinates: 70°30′S 14°30′E
- Thickness: unknown
- Terminus: Lazarev Ice Shelf
- Status: unknown

Entuziasty Glacier (70°30′S 14°30′E) is a broad outlet glacier of Queen Maud Land, flowing generally northward into the Lazarev Ice Shelf. It is nourished in its upper reaches by ice draining from the Hoel Mountains and the northeast end of the Wohlthat Mountains, and its tributaries include the Mushketov Glacier. The lower part of the glacier, particularly the relationship with the Mushketov Glacier, was first delineated by the Soviet Antarctic Expedition in 1961. They named it "Lednik Entuziastov" (enthusiasts' glacier).

== See also ==
- List of glaciers in the Antarctic
- Glaciology
