= Kasumi Rock =

Rock formation in eastern Antarctica

Kasumi Rock (68°22′S 42°14′E) is a substantial rock exposure on the coast between Ichime Glacier and Kasumi Glacier in Queen Maud Land, Antarctica. It was mapped from surveys and air photos by the Japanese Antarctic Research Expedition, 1957–62, who also gave the name.
