= Lake Untersee =

Freshwater lake in Queen Maud Land in East Antarctica

- Untersee (German)
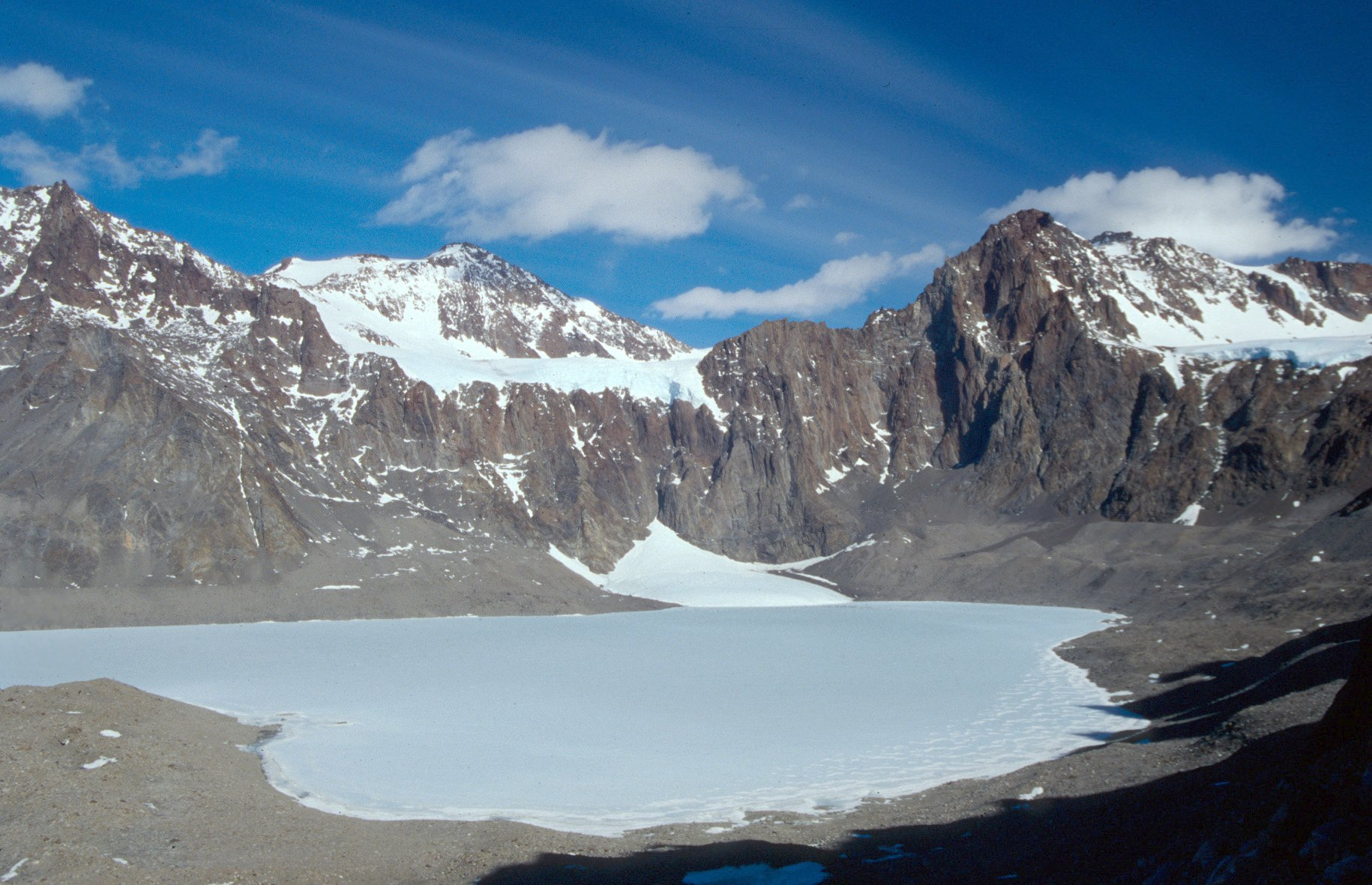
- Lake Untersee in 1996

- Location of Lake Untersee in Antarctica
- Location: Queen Maud Land, Antarctica
- Coordinates: 71°20′S 13°27′E
- Type: glacial
- Etymology: "Lower Lake" (from German "unter" [lower] + "see" [lake])
- Basin countries: (Antarctica)
- Max. length: 6.5 kilometres (4.0 mi)
- Max. width: 2.5 kilometres (1.6 mi)
- Surface area: 11.4 square kilometres (4.4 mi^{2})
- Max. depth: 169 metres (554 ft)
- Surface elevation: 563 metres (1,847 ft)
- Frozen: Permanently
- References: Wand et al.

Lake Untersee (German: Untersee, pronounced [ˈʊntɐzeː], lit. 'Lower Lake') is the largest surface freshwater lake in the interior of the Gruber Mountains of central Queen Maud Land in East Antarctica. It is situated 90 kilometres (56 mi) to the southeast of the Schirmacher Oasis.

The lake is approximately 6.5 kilometres (4.0 mi) long and 2.5 kilometres (1.6 mi) wide, with a surface area of 11.4 square kilometres (4.4 mi^{2}), and a maximum depth of 169 metres (554 ft). The lake is permanently covered with ice and is partly bounded by glacier ice.

Lake Untersee is an unusual lake, with pH between 9.8 and 12.1, dissolved oxygen at 150 per cent supersaturation, and very low primary production in the water column. Despite the high oxygen supersaturation in most of the lake, there is a small sub-basin at the southern end that is anoxic, and its sediments may have a higher methane concentration than those of any other known lake on Earth. Much of the primary production is in microbial communities that grow on the floor of the lake as stromatolites. The water temperature varies between 0.5 °C (32.9 °F) and 5 °C (41 °F) and the ice cover on the lake is 2–6 metres (6.6–19.7 ft) thick.

The ice cover may have persisted for over 100,000 years, and some scientists studying climate change fear significant environmental changes associated with global warming in the coming decades. In the past, the water chemistry of the lake has been compared to Clorox. However, the chemical activity of bleach is due to Cl^{−} in addition to a pH that is higher than that measures in Lake Untersee, and Lake Untersee does not have high chlorine or chlorite concentrations.

== Geography ==
Lake Untersee lies in the interior of the Gruber Mountains of central Queen Maud Land in East Antarctica, which is roughly on the same longitude as Huab, in the Skeleton Coast National Park on the northern coast of Namibia. It is situated 90 kilometres (56 mi) to the southeast of the Schirmacher Oasis. Aurkjosen Cirque lies at the east side of the lake.

The lake is approximately 6.5 kilometres (4.0 mi) long and 2.5 kilometres (1.6 mi) wide and has a surface area of 11.4 square kilometres (4.4 mi^{2}) (10 square kilometres (3.9 mi^{2}) is also reported). Its maximum depth is 169 metres (554 ft). It is permanently covered with ice, which has an average thickness of 3 metres (9.8 ft) in summer. The lake is dammed by the Anuchin Glacier, and meltwater from the Anuchin Glacier is the main source of water. The lake has no outlet. Water is lost through sublimation and ablation of the ice cover. The lake is categorized as an ultra-oligotrophic lake.

Lake Ober-See, a smaller (3.4 square kilometres (1.3 mi^{2}) glacial lake, is located a few kilometres to the northeast and is similar in most respects.

== History ==
Isotope studies have established that the lake has long had a permanent ice cover. Further, studies carried out during the austral summer confirm the lake's homogeneous characteristics, with thermal convection as the reason given for its hydro-geochemical and isotropical nature. It is replenished perennially by a process of underwater melting of the adjacent glacier ice. It is also stated that the lake existed during the Holocene period when it emerged from a melt-water pond.

Studies of Lake Untersee have revealed that there are several large boulders which dam the lake. Geodetic studies carried out during two summer seasons indicated that the boulders move at an annual rate of 1.1–3.9 metres (3.6–12.8 ft). Residence time of the boulders has been estimated as 500 years. The floating boulders, which are several metres in diameter, have evolved as result of debris deposits from pro-glacial interaction, mass wasting from hills surrounding the lake and the displacement of glacial ice by lake ice.

The lake was first discovered by the German Antarctic Expedition of 1938–39. After that, several expeditions have studied the lake's characteristics. The first reconnaissance study of the lake was carried out by N. G. Kosenko and D. D. Kolobov in early 1969, followed by more studies by Russian and German scientists, namely by W. D. Hermichen et al. (1985), E. Kaup et al. (1988) and A. Loopmann et al. (1988).

=== Research ===
In studies carried out prior to 1991–92 on physical and chemical parameters of the lake water, Lake Untersee was stated to be well-mixed and unstratified. However, studies performed in the summer of 1991–92 found significant stratification in a 500-metre (1,600 ft) wide trough in the southeastern part of the lake, where it is up to 105 metres (344 ft) deep. There were sharp vertical gradients of temperature, pH, dissolved oxygen and electrical conductivity. While a thermocline was recorded at a depth between 40 metres (130 ft) and 50 metres (160 ft), an oxycline followed at 70–80 metres (230–260 ft), with a chemocline extending from 80 metres (260 ft) to bottom of the lake. Below 80 metres (260 ft), the water column was anoxic and smelled of hydrogen sulfide. The presence of hydrogen sulfide was associated with decreased sulfate concentrations, indicating that it probably arose from bacterial reduction of sulfate.

The salt content of the upper levels of the lake is about 50 times that of glacial meltwater. Salinity increased below 80 metres (260 ft), with sodium ion concentration and electrolytic conductivity more than doubling. The lake is highly alkaline (pH 10.4) down to a depth of 70 metres (230 ft); below this depth, pH drops, reaching the slightly acidic value of 6.1 at maximum depth. The proportion of methane in the sediment at the lake bottom is the highest recorded for any lake in the world, according to NASA scientists.

In 2008, as part of the Tawani Foundation 2008 Antarctic International Expedition (see below), Dale Andersen and Ian Hawes discovered conical stromatolites growing in Lake Untersee, the largest living ones known to date. Small microbial pinnacles are also present, and it appears that the large conical stromatolites and the small pinnacles are made by different microbial communities. These communities provide an important analog to some of the oldest fossil stromatolites found to date.

=== Expeditions ===
In November and December 2008, the "Tawani Foundation 2008 Antarctic International Expedition" headed by Richard Hoover of NASA's Marshall Space Flight Center used the lake as a test bed in its hunt for extreme life. Conditions in the lake are similar in some respects to those thought to exist on other moons and planets that contain water ice and methane; thus, this lake might provide an analog to environments that exist elsewhere in space. The expedition did find several new strains of extremophile microorganisms in the lake's waters, including a chemolithotroph that metabolises hydrogen.

This expedition involved an interdisciplinary international team of ten scientists and two teachers who explored not only Lake Untersee but also the Schirmacher Oasis. The geomicrobiological aspects of this expedition had three objectives: "to test laser induced fluorescence emission (L.I.F.E.) to be used for the exploration of the Mars regolith and poles; monitor global climate change; and to evaluate methods for detecting hydrocarbon contamination and subsequent bio-remediation in a fragile, endangered ecosystem." The results indicate that Lake Untersee, as a permanently ice-covered region, has very little usable soil and could be likened to the polar regions of Mars.

Experiments conducted have examined the metagenomes of eukaryotes; identified Prokaryotes and viruses inhabiting the lake; provided evidence of virus-mediated horizontal gene transfer and adaptive metabolic or cold protective phenotype alterations, identified microbial nanowire connections between multiple species at the ice-water interface, in the water column, and in the sediment; and established biomass estimates of life in the lake ice during the early spring growing season using laser-induced fluorescence emission (L.I.F.E.) imaging techniques.

Two scientific divers were also part of this team. Dale Andersen, with the SETI Institute's Carl Sagan Center for the Study of Life in the Universe, and Ian Hawes of Aquatic Research Solutions dived in Lake Untersee to study its unique microbial communities.
