= Solhøgdene Heights =

Solhogdene Heights (71°22′S 13°42′E) is the heights 1 nautical mile (1.9 km) east of Mount Mentzel, overlooking the north side of Asimutbreen Glacier in the eastern Gruber Mountains of the Wohlthat Mountains, Queen Maud Land. Discovered and plotted from air photos by German Antarctic Expedition, 1938–39. Replotted from air photos and surveys by Norwegian Antarctic Expedition, 1956–60, and named Solhogdene (the sun heights).
