= Sør Rondane Mountains =

Mountain range in Antarctica

Coordinates: 72°0′S 25°0′E

Location of Sør Rondane Mountains in Queen Maud Land, Antarctica

The Sør Rondane Mountains are a group of mountains about 100 miles (160 km) long with main peaks rising to 3400 m, between the Queen Fabiola Mountains and Wohlthat Mountains in Queen Maud Land. They were discovered and photographed from the air by members of the Lars Christensen Expedition (LCE) on February 6, 1937, and named after Rondane, a mountain massif in southern Norway. The mountains and their constituent features were mapped in greater detail and named in 1957 by Norwegian cartographers working with air photos taken by U.S. Navy Operation Highjump, 1946–47.

== Features ==
=== Mountains ===
- Austhamaren: 2,060 metres (6,760 ft) high, standing close east of Byrdbreen glacier. "Austhamaren" means "the east hammer."
- Austhjelmen: 1,740 m (5,710 ft) high, standing 2 nautical miles (3.7 km) east of Vesthjelmen. "Austhjelmen" means the "east helmet."
- Balchen: 2,820 m (9,250 ft) high, at the east side of Byrdbreen. Named for Bernt Balchen, famous Norwegian polar aviator.
- Bamse: 2,500 m (8,200 ft) high, standing 11 nmi (20 km) west of Mount Nils Larsen. "Bamsefjell" means "bear mountain."
- Bautaen: 2,240 m (7,350 ft) high, on the northeast side of Mount Bergersen. "Bautaen" means "the monolith."
- Bergersen: 2,636 m (8,648 ft) high, at the west side of Byrdbreen. Named for Ambassador Birger Bergersen. A prominent rock pinnacle called Tårnet Pinnacle ("the tower") sits on its northwest side.
- Bond Peaks: a group of peaks, 3,180 m (10,430 ft) high, at the southwest side of Mount Bergersen. Named for United States Navy Captain Charles A. Bond, commander of the Western Group of Operation Highjump.
- Borchgrevink: 2,390 m (7,840 ft) high, 3 nmi (6 km) south of the Tanngarden Peaks. Named for Captain Otto Borchgrevink, leader of the Norwegian whaling expedition 1930–31.
- Brattnipane Peaks: a group of peaks, the highest 2,660 m (8,730 ft) tall, 9 nmi (17 km) northwest of Mefjell. "Brattnipane" means the "steep peaks."
- Devold: 3,280 m (10,760 ft) high, between Kjelbotn and the Pukkelen Rocks near the head of Byrdbreen. Named for Antarctic explorer Hallvard Devold.
- Dufek Mountain: is a large mountain rising to 3,150 m (10,330 ft), standing 2 nmi (3.7 km; 2.3 mi) southwest of Mefjell. It was named for Rear Admiral George J. Dufek, commander of the Eastern Group of Operation Highjump.
- Dungane Peaks: a pair of peaks 2,870 m (9,420 ft) high, standing 9 nmi (17 km) west of Dufek Mountain. "Dungane" means "the heaps."
- Fidjeland: 1,630 m (5,350 ft) high, close northeast of Mehaugen Hill on the west side of the mouth of Byrdbreen. Named mechanic Tom Fidjeland of the Lars Christensen Expedition (LCE) 1936–37.
- Isachsen: a large mountain 2,750 m (9,020 ft) high, standing 4 nmi (7 km; 5 mi) southeast of Bergersen. Named for Major Gunnar Isachsen, the leader with Captain Hjalmar Riiser-Larsen of the Norwegian expedition 1930–31.
- Kjelbotn: 3,210 m (10,530 ft) high, between Isachsen and Devold. Named for Antarctic explorer Olav Kjelbotn.
- Komsa Mountain: 2,960 m (9,710 ft) high, located between Koms Glacier and Salen Mountain. "Komsa" means "the Lapp cradle."
- Luncke Range: a range of peaks rising to 3,020 m (9,900 ft), extending in a north–south direction for 10 nmi (19 km) between Jennings and Gjel glaciers. Named for Norwegian cartographer Bernhard Luncke.
- Mefjell: is a large mountain rising to 3,080 m (10,100 ft), 5 nmi (9 km) west of Mount Bergersen. "Mefjell" means "middle mountain".
- Menipa: 2,590 m (8,500 ft) high, 5 nmi (9 km) north of Mefjell in the central part of the range. "Menipa" means "middle peak."
- Nils Larsen: 2,190 m (7,190 ft), 3 nmi (5.6 km) southwest of Mount Wideroe. Named for Captain Nils Larsen, leader of the Norwegian expedition 1928–29.
- Prince de Ligne Mountains: a small group of mountains rising to 2,285 metres (7,497 ft), standing 10 nautical miles (19 km) north of the Belgica Mountains sub-range. Discovered by the Belgian Antarctic Expedition of 1957–1958 and named for expedition member Prince Antoine de Ligne.
- Rogers Peaks: a small group of peaks standing just southwest of Dufek. Named for US Navy Lt. Commander William J. Rogers, aerial crew commander with Operation Highjump.
- Salen: 2,950 m (9,680 ft) high, between Komsa Mountain and Sal Glacier. "Salen" means "the saddle"; named for its shape.
- Simensen Peak: 2,215 m (7,267 ft) high, on the north side of Glitrefonna Glacier. Named for LCE photographer Erik Simensen.
- Sørhjelmen: stands 2,030 m (6,660 ft) high at the head of Hette Glacier. "Sørhjelmen" means "the south helmet."
- Strandrud: 2,070 m (6,790 ft) high, rising above the glacial ice at the southeast side of the Austkampane Hills. Named for one of the LCE mechanics.
- Tanngarden Peaks: a row of peaks, 2,350 metres (7,710 ft) high, just north of Vikinghodga and Mount Widerøe. "Tanngarden" means "the row of teeth."
- Tustane Peaks: a group of peaks at the head of Koms Glacier. "Tustane" means "the clumps".
- Tvetaggen Peaks: a short line of peaks 1.5 nmi (2.8 km) north of Austkampane Hills on the west side of the Kamp Glacier. Named "Tvetaggen" meaning "the double prongs" because of their appearance.
- Vesthjelmen: 1,810 metres (5,940 ft), 8 nmi (15 km) west of Austhamaren. "Vesthjelmen" means "the west helmet." Hjelmkalven Point is a rocky point on its north side.
- Vikinghogda: a prominent flat-topped mountain, 2,960 m (9,710 ft) high m, between the Tanngarden Peaks and Widerøe. "Vikinghogda" means "the Viking heights."
- Walnum: a large mountain rising to 2,870 m (9,420 ft), standing 4 nmi (7.4 km) east of Widerøe. Named for Ragnvald Walnum, one-time chairman of the Norwegian Whaling Board.
- Mount Widerøe: a large mountain rising to 2,994 m between Walnum and Nils Larsen. Named for LCE pilot Viggo Widerøe. Vengen Spur ("the wing") projects north from the east part of Widerøe.

=== Glaciers ===
- Borchgrevinkisen
- Byrdbreen
- Ellis Glacier
- Fimbulheimen
- Gillock Glacier
- Gjel Glacier
- Glitrefonna Glacier
- Gunnestad Glacier
- Hansenbreen
- Hargreavesbreen
- Hette Glacier
- Jennings Glacier
- Kamp Glacier
- Koms Glacier
- Kreitzerisen
- Mefjell Glacier
- Mjell Glacier
- Nipe Glacier
- Oberst Glacier
- Sal Glacier

=== Hills ===
- Austkampane Hills: a group of hills rising to 2,210 m (7,250 ft), standing 5 nmi (9.3 km) north of Menipa. "Austkampane" means "the east crags."
- Blåklettane Hills: a small group of hills standing 18 nmi (33 km) southwest of Bamse Mountain at the southwest end of the range. "Blåklettane" means "the blue hills."
- Bulken: 2,220 m (7,280 ft) high, standing 3 nmi (5.6 km) north of Balchen. "Bulken" means "the lump."
- Glashaugen: a small rocky hill 2 nmi (4 km) north of the Bleikskoltane Rocks, near the head of Byrdbreen glacier. "Glashaugen" means "the glass hill."
- Isklakken: a rocky hill 2 nmi (3.7 km) east of Balchen at the eastern end of the range. "Isklakken" means "the ice lump."
- Kaggen: a small ice-covered hill standing in Byrdbreen glacier, 7 nautical miles (13 km) east of Mount Bergersen. "Kaggen" means "the keg."
- Kamp Glacier Hills: three hills border the east side of Kamp Glacier.
  - Nordhaugen: the northernmost; "Nordhaugen" means "the north hill."
  - Mehaugen: the middle hill; "Mehaugen" means "the middle hill."
  - Sørhaugen: the southernmost; "Sørdhaugen" means "the south hill."
- Krakken: a rocky hill standing in Byrdbreen, 5 nmi (9.3 km) east of Bautaen Peak. "Krakken" means "the stool."
- Lågkollane Hills: a group of hills 7 nmi (13 km) north of Bamse Mountain between Kreitzerisen and Hansenbreen. "Lågkollane" means "the low hills."

=== Nunataks ===
- Devoldkalven: a 2,215 m (7,267 ft) nunatak near Devold Peak in the high section of Byrdbreen glacier. Named for Antarctic explorer Hallvard Devold.
- Dotten: a nunatak 2 nmi (3.7 km) north of Smalegga Ridge, near the mouth of Gillock Glacier. "Dotten" means "the lump."
- Nordtoppen: stands 1,100 m (3,600 ft) high, 16 nmi (30 km) north of the Austkampane Hills. "Nordtoppen" means "the north peak."
- Småhausane Nunataks: a group of small nunataks 1,180 m (3,870 ft) high, between Fidjeland and Nordtoppen Nunatak on the north side of the range. "Småhausane" means "the small crags."
- Taggen: stands between Borchgrevinkisen and Kreitzerisen glaciers in the western part of the range. "Taggen" means "the prong."
- Teltet: a prominent nunatak 2 nmi (3.7 km) north of Vengen Spur on Mount Widerøe. "Teltet" means "the tent."
- Tertene Nunataks: a group of small nunataks on the west side of Kreitzerisen. "Tertene means "the tarts."
- Trillingane Nunataks: a trio of nunataks standing 6 nmi (11 km) northeast of Balchen at the east end of the range. "Trillingane" means "the triplets."
- Utsteinen: a nunatak standing 4 nmi (7.4 km) north of Vikinghogda. Named Utsteinen ("the outer stone") because of its position. Belgian research station Princess Elisabeth Base was established on this nunatak in 2009.
- Vesthaugen: a nunatak rising to 1,400 m (4,600 ft), standing 15 nmi (28 km) northwest of the Brattnipane Peaks. "Vesthaugen" means "the west hill."
- Vørterkaka: a rock outcrop 1 nmi (1.9 km) south of the Bleikskoltane Rocks at the southeast extremity of the range. Vørterkaka or Vørterkake are a type of round Norwegian sweet rolls containing brewer's wort.

=== Rock outcroppings ===
- Bleikskoltane Rocks: a rocky outcrop 7 nmi (13 km) south of Balchen in the southeast part of the range. "Bleikskoltane" means "the pale knolls."
- Bollene Rocks: a group of rocks just west of the Bleikskoltane Rocks at the head of Byrdbreen. "Bollene" means "the buns."
- Pukkelen Rocks: a rock outcropping just west of the Bollene Rocks at the head of Byrdbreen. "Pukkelen" means "the hump."
- Roysane Rocks: a group of rocks 4 nmi (7.4 km) southeast of Mount Nils Larsen. "Roysane" means "the pile of stones."

=== Other ===
- Bulkisen: a blue ice field between Austhamaren Peak and Bulken Hill. Named Bulkisen because of association with Bulken Hill.
- Byrdbreen
- Kvalfinnen Ridge: a ridge, 2,670 m (8,760 ft) high, on the west side of Byrdbreen and 0.5 nmi (0.93 km) north of Isachsen Mountain. "Kvalfinnen" means "the whale fin", and it was named for its shape.
- Smalegga Ridge: 4 nmi (7.4 km) long, extending north from Mount Walnum to the west of Gillock Glacier. "Smalegga" means "the narrow ridge."

== See also ==
- Mount Romnaes, an isolated mountain close to this range
- Russkiye Mountains, a mountain range between the Sør Rondane Mountains and the Hoel Mountains
- Tangekilen Bay, an indentation of the ice shelf north of the Sør Rondane Mountains
