= Trollkjelen Crevasse Field =

Crevasse field in Antarctica

Trollkjelen Crevasse Field (71°17′S 0°50′W) is a crevasse field about 12 nautical miles (22 km) long in the Fimbul Ice Shelf, lying immediately off the northeast side of Trollkjelneset Headland in Queen Maud Land. Mapped by Norwegian cartographers from surveys and air photos by Norwegian-British-Swedish Antarctic Expedition (NBSAE) (1949–52) and air photos by the Norwegian expedition (1958–59) and named Trollkjelen (the troll's cauldron).
