= Jutulgryta Crevasses =

Crevasse field in Antarctica

Jutulgryta Crevasses (71°16′S 0°27′E) is a crevasse field about 12 nautical miles (22 km) long, at the east side of the mouth of Jutulstraumen Glacier in Queen Maud Land, Antarctica. It was mapped by Norwegian cartographers from surveys and air photos by the Norwegian–British–Swedish Antarctic Expedition (1949–52) and from air photos by the Norwegian expedition (1958–59) and named Jutulgryta (the giant's caldron).
