= Lokehellene Cliffs =

Coordinates: 71°56′S 8°47′E

The Lokehellene Cliffs are steep rock cliffs which form the west side of Nupsskarvet Mountain, in the Kurze Mountains of Queen Maud Land, Antarctica. They were mapped from surveys and air photos by the Sixth Norwegian Antarctic Expedition (1956–60) and named Lokehellene (Loki slopes) after the Norse god Loki.
