= Viddalskollen Hill =

Antarctica hill

Viddalskollen Hill (72°25′S 2°19′W) is a hill 6 nautical miles (11 km) southwest of Nashornet Mountain, on the south side of Vaddalen Valley in Queen Maud Land. It was mapped by Norwegian cartographers from surveys and air photos by the Norwegian-British-Swedish Antarctic Expedition (NBSAE) (1949–52) and air photos by the Norwegian expedition (1958–59) and named Viddalskollen, meaning "the wide valley's knoll."
