= Edwin E. Ellis =

American inventor and photographer

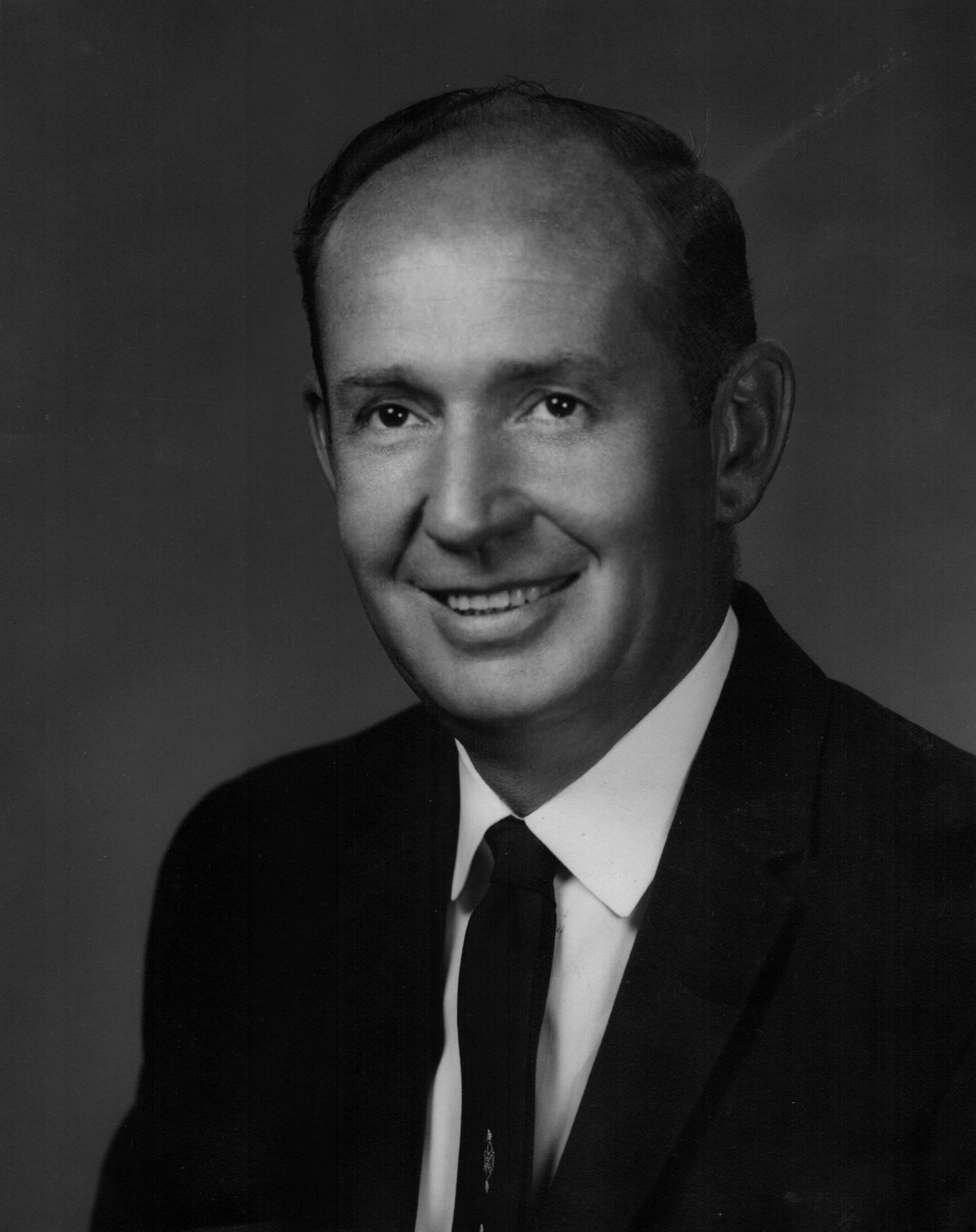
- Edwin E. Ellis

Personal details
- Born: August 28, 1924 Brainerd, Minnesota, U.S.A.
- Died: April 2, 1989 (aged 64) Paducah, Kentucky, U.S.A.
- Spouse: Stella Beatrice Ellis (née Irby)
- Children: Edwin "Ed" Earl Ellis, Jr.; Linda Elaine Johnson (née Ellis); Donald Wayne Ellis
- Occupation: Photographer, inventor, businessman

Military service
- Allegiance: United States
- Branch/service: United States Navy
- Years of service: 1943–1949
- Battles/wars: World War II

Edwin Earl Ellis (August 28, 1924 - April 2, 1989) was an American inventor and photographer.

== Life ==
He served in the U.S. Navy from 1943 to 1949 as a photographer. During this time he participated in the landings at the Battle of Okinawa. Most notably, he was a photographer on Operation Highjump, becoming one of the first people to visually document Antarctica. The Ellis Fjord and the Ellis Glacier are named after him. After the South Pole, he went to Norfolk, and was part of the crew that commissioned the USS Coral Sea (CV-43). He was also the founder of the Ellis Trailer Park in Paducah. The land it sat on is now owned by Cardinal Lanes.

=== Inventor ===
As an inventor he holds a patent for an awning support system.

== Personal life ==
On August 16, 1947, he married Stella Beatrice Ellis (née Irby). The couple had their first child, Edwin "Ed" Earl Ellis, Jr., on May 25, 1954. Two other children followed: Linda Elaine Johnson (née) Ellis on July 13, 1959, and Donald Wayne Ellis on August 5, 1960.

He died April 2, 1989, in Paducah, Kentucky
