= International Polar Foundation =

Polar research organisation

Based in Brussels, Belgium, the International Polar Foundation (IPF) communicates and educates on polar science and polar research as a way to understand key environmental and climate mechanisms. The foundation also promotes innovative and multifaceted responses to the complex challenges raised by the need for action on sustainable development, and designed, built and operates the first zero emission Antarctic scientific research station Princess Elisabeth Antarctica. The IPF was founded in 2002 by polar explorers Alain Hubert, Hugo Decleir and André Berger.

== Partnerships ==
The foundation is an active member of the University of the Arctic. UArctic is an international cooperative network based in the Circumpolar Arctic region, consisting of more than 200 universities, colleges, and other organizations with an interest in promoting education and research in the Arctic region.

== See also ==
- Princess Elisabeth Base
