= Aurkjosen Cirque =

Cirque in Antarctica

Coordinates: 71°21′S 13°33′E

The Aurkjosen Cirque is a mainly ice-free cirque marked by several old moraines, lying at the east side of Lake Unter-See in the Gruber Mountains of the Wohlthat Mountains, Queen Maud Land. It was discovered and plotted from air photos by the Third German Antarctic Expedition, 1938–39, re-plotted from air photos and from surveys by the Sixth Norwegian Antarctic Expedition, 1956–60, and named "Aurkjosen" ("the gravel cove").
