= Gunnestad Glacier =

Glacier in Antarctica

Glnnestad Glacier
- Location of Queen Maud Land in Antarctica

- Location within Antarctica
- Location: Queen Maud Land
- Coordinates: 72°3′S 23°50′E
- Length: 2 nmi (4 km; 2 mi)
- Thickness: unknown
- Terminus: Sør Rondane Mountains
- Status: unknown

Gunnestad Glacier (72°3′S 23°50′E) is a glacier 13 nautical miles (24 km) long, flowing north between Mount Widerøe and Mount Walnum in the Sør Rondane Mountains of Antarctica. It was mapped by Norwegian cartographers in 1957 from air photos taken by U.S. Navy Operation Highjump, 1946–47, and named for Lieutenant Alf Gunnestad, a pilot with the Norwegian expedition under Lars Christensen, 1933–34.

== See also ==
- List of glaciers in the Antarctic
- Glaciology
