= Hålisrimen Peak =

Mountain in Antarctica

Hålisrimen Peak (72°1′S 8°52′E) is a peak, 2,655 metres (8,710 ft) high, rising 2 nautical miles (4 km) northwest of Halisstonga Peak in the Kurze Mountains of Queen Maud Land, Antarctica. It was mapped by Norwegian cartographers from surveys and air photos by the Sixth Norwegian Antarctic Expedition (1956–60) and named Hålisrimen (the slippery ice frost).
