= Langskavlen Glacier =

Glacier in Antarctica

- Location of Queen Maud Land in Antarctica

- Location within Antarctica
- Type: steep
- Location: Queen Maud Land
- Coordinates: 72°1′S 14°29′E
- Thickness: unknown
- Terminus: Payer Mountains
- Status: unknown

Langskavlen Glacier (72°1′S 14°29′E) is a short, steep glacier flowing from the north side of Skavlhø Mountain in the Payer Mountains of Queen Maud Land, Antarctica. It was mapped by Norwegian cartographers from surveys and air photos by the Sixth Norwegian Antarctic Expedition (1956–60) and named Langskavlen (the long snowdrift).

== See also ==
- List of glaciers in the Antarctic
- Glaciology
