= Mendeleyevsky =

Mendeleyevsky (masculine), Mendeleyevskaya (feminine), or Mendeleyevskoye (neuter) may refer to:

- Mendeleyevsky District, a district of the Republic of Tatarstan, Russia
- Mendeleyevskaya, a station of the Moscow Metro, Moscow, Russia
