= Hette Glacier =

Glacier in Antarctica

- Location of Queen Maud Land in Antarctica

- Location within Antarctica
- Location: Queen Maud Land
- Coordinates: 71°43′S 26°35′E
- Length: 6 nmi (11 km; 7 mi)
- Thickness: unknown
- Terminus: Sør Rondane Mountains
- Status: unknown

Hette Glacier (71°43′S 26°35′E) is a glacier, 6 nautical miles (11 km) long, flowing north between the Hettene Nunataks and Austhamaren Peak in the Sør Rondane Mountains of Antarctica. It was mapped by Norwegian cartographers in 1957 from air photos taken by U.S. Navy Operation Highjump, 1946–47, and named Hettebreen (the cap glacier).

== See also ==
- List of glaciers in the Antarctic
- Glaciology
