= Svea Glacier =

Glacier in Antarctica

- Location of Queen Maud Land in Antarctica

- Location within Antarctica
- Location: Queen Maud Land
- Coordinates: 72°08′S 1°53′E
- Thickness: unknown
- Status: unknown

Svea Glacier (72°8′S 1°53′E) is a broad glacier flowing north between the Sverdrup and Gjelsvik Mountains in Queen Maud Land. Photographed from the air by the German Antarctic Expedition (1938–39). Mapped by Norwegian cartographers from surveys and air photos by Norwegian-British-Swedish Antarctic Expedition (NBSAE) (1949–52) and air photos by the Norwegian expedition (1958–59) and named Sveabreen (the glacier of the Swedes).

== See also ==
- List of glaciers in the Antarctic
- Glaciology
