= Naga-iwa Rock =

Naga-iwa Rock (68°27′S 41°31′E) is a conspicuous rock on the shore protruding into the sea 2 nautical miles (3.7 km) east of Cape Akarui, in Queen Maud Land. Mapped from surveys and air photos by Japanese Antarctic Research Expedition (JARE), 1957–62, and named Naga-iwa (long rock).
