= Kamp Glacier =

Glacier in Antarctica

- Location of Queen Maud Land in Antarctica

- Location within Antarctica
- Location: Queen Maud Land
- Coordinates: 71°45′S 25°24′E
- Length: 8 nmi (15 km; 9 mi)
- Thickness: unknown
- Terminus: Sør Rondane Mountains
- Status: unknown

Kamp Glacier (71°45′S 25°24′E) is a glacier, 8 nautical miles (15 km) long, flowing northwest between the Austkampane Hills on the west and Nordhaugen Hill, Mehaugen Hill and Sørhaugen Hill on the east, in the Sør Rondane Mountains of Antarctica. It was mapped by Norwegian cartographers in 1957 from air photos taken by U.S. Navy Operation Highjump, 1946–47, and named Kampbreen (the crag glacier).

== See also ==
- List of glaciers in the Antarctic
- Glaciology
