= Styggebrekka Crevasses =

Crevasse field in Antarctica

Coordinates: 71°58′S 5°44′E

Styggebrekka Crevasses is a crevasse field near the center of Austreskorve Glacier, in the Muhlig-Hofmann Mountains of Queen Maud Land. Plotted from surveys and air photos by Norwegian Antarctic Expedition (1956–60) and named Styggebrekka (the dangerous slope).
