= Glitrefonna Glacier =

Glacier in Antarctica

- Location of Queen Maud Land in Antarctica

- Location within Antarctica
- Location: Queen Maud Land
- Coordinates: 71°57′S 25°33′E
- Thickness: unknown
- Terminus: Sør Rondane Mountains
- Status: unknown

Glitrefonna Glacier (71°57′S 25°33′E) is a glacier at the north side of Mount Bergersen in the Sør Rondane Mountains of Antarctica. It was mapped by Norwegian cartographers in 1957 from air photos taken by U.S. Navy Operation Highjump, 1946–47, and named Glitrefonna (the glitter glacier).

== See also ==
- List of glaciers in the Antarctic
- Glaciology
