= Wangenheim (surname) =

Wangenheim is a German surname associated with the Wangenheim family, a German noble family. Notable people with the surname include:

- Alexander Freiherr von Wangenheim (1872–1959), German Nazi politician
- Baroness Elisabeth of Wangenheim-Winterstein (1912–2010), the wife of Charles Augustus, Hereditary Grand Duke of Saxe-Weimar-Eisenach
- Chris von Wangenheim (1942–1981), German fashion photographer
- Christoph August von Wangenheim (1741–1830), German Hanoverian army officer and court official
- Friedrich Adam Julius von Wangenheim (1749-1800), German botanist specializing in forestry
- Hans Freiherr von Wangenheim (1859–1915), German diplomat
- Gustav von Wangenheim (1895–1975), German actor, screenwriter and director
- Inge von Wangenheim (1912–1993), German actress
- Konrad Freiherr von Wangenheim (1909–1953), German army Cavalry Captain
- Volker Wangenheim (1928–2014), German conductor, composer and academic teacher

== See also ==
- Wagenheim
