= Utsteinen Nunatak =

Mountain in Queen Maud Land, Antarctica

Coordinates: 71°58′S 23°34′E

Utsteinen Nunatak is a nunatak standing 4 nautical miles (7 km) north of Viking Heights and the main group of the Sør Rondane Mountains. Mapped by Norwegian cartographers in 1957 from air photos taken by U.S. Navy Operation Highjump, 1946–47, and named Utsteinen ("the outer stone") because of its position.

The Belgian research station Princess Elisabeth was established at Utsteinen Nunatak during the International Polar Year 2007–2008.
