= Byrdbreen =

Glacier in Antarctica

Byrdbreen Glacier
- Location of Queen Maud Land in Antarctica

- Location within Antarctica
- Location: Queen Maud Land
- Coordinates: 72°45′S 26°00′E
- Length: 40 nmi (74 km; 46 mi)
- Width: 11 nmi (20 km; 13 mi)
- Thickness: unknown
- Terminus: Sør Rondane Mountains
- Status: unknown

Byrdbreen (71°45′S 26°0′E) is, at about 40 nautical miles (74 km) long and 11 nautical miles (20 km) wide, the largest glacier flowing northwest between Mount Bergersen and Balchen Mountain in the Sør Rondane Mountains. It was mapped by Norwegian cartographers in 1957 from air photos taken by U.S. Navy Operation Highjump, 1946–47, and named for Rear Admiral Richard E. Byrd, U.S. Navy, commander of U.S. Navy Operation Highjump.

== See also ==
- Glaciology
- Hjelmkalven Point
- Krakken Hill
- List of glaciers in the Antarctic
