= Viddalen Valley =

Valley in Queen Maud Land, Antarctica

Viddalen Valley (72°20′S 2°45′W) is a broad ice-filled valley which drains eastward between the south end of Ahlmann Ridge and the Borg Massif in Queen Maud Land in Antarctica.

It was mapped by Norwegian cartographers from surveys and air photos by the Norwegian-British-Swedish Antarctic Expedition (1949–1952) and air photos by the Norwegian expedition (1958–59) and named Viddalen, meaning "the wide valley".

== See also ==
- Nashornkalvane Rocks
