= Oberst Glacier =

Glacier in Antarctica

- Location of Queen Maud Land in Antarctica

- Location within Antarctica
- Location: Queen Maud Land
- Coordinates: 72°3′S 27°4′E
- Thickness: unknown
- Terminus: Sør Rondane Mountains
- Status: unknown

Oberst Glacier (72°3′S 27°4′E) is a glacier draining the west side of Balchen Mountain in the Sor Rondane Mountains. Mapped by Norwegian cartographers in 1957 from air photos taken by U.S. Navy Operation Highjump, 1946–47, and named Oberstbreen (the colonel glacier) because of its association with Balchen Mountain. Bernt Balchen, a famous Norwegian polar aviator, achieved the rank of colonel in the U.S. Army Air Force in World War II.

== See also ==
- List of glaciers in the Antarctic
- Glaciology
