= Hargreavesbreen =

Glacier in Antarctica

Hargreavesbreen Glacier
- Location of Queen Maud Land in Antarctica

- Location within Antarctica
- Type: cirque glacier
- Location: Queen Maud Land
- Coordinates: 72°11′S 23°13′E
- Thickness: unknown
- Terminus: Sør Rondane Mountains
- Status: unknown

Hargreavesbreen (72°11′S 23°13′E) is a short, steep glacier flowing northwest between Mount Nils Larsen and Mount Widerøe in the Sør Rondane Mountains of Antarctica. It was mapped by Norwegian cartographers in 1957 from air photos taken by U.S. Navy Operation Highjump, 1946–47, and named for R.B. Hargreaves, an aerial photographer on Operation Highjump photographic flights in this area and other coastal areas between 14°E and 164°E.

== See also ==
- List of glaciers in the Antarctic
- Glaciology
