= Princess Elisabeth Antarctica =

Belgian research station in Queen Maud Land, Antarctica

Princess Elisabeth Station Prinses Elisabethbasis Station Princesse-Élisabeth Prinzessin-Elisabeth-Station
- Antarctic Station
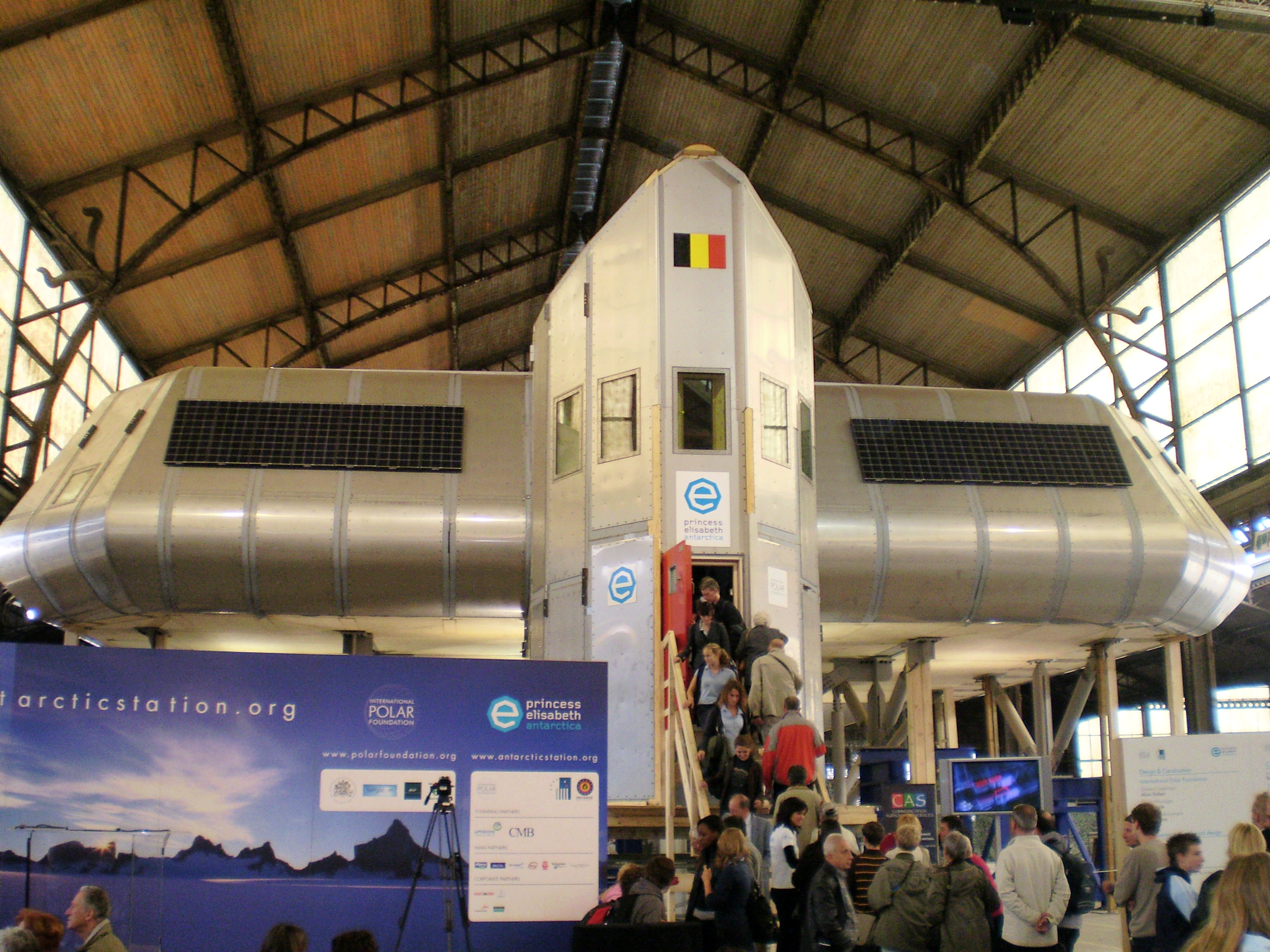
- Test build and public presentation, September 2007, Brussels

- Location of Princess Elisabeth Station in Antarctica
- Coordinates: 71°57′00″S 23°20′49″E
- Country: Belgium
- Location in Antarctica: Utsteinen Nunatak; Queen Maud Land; Antarctica
- Administered by: International Polar Foundation
- Established: 15 February 2009
- Elevation: 1,382 m (4,534 ft)

Population (2017)
  - Summer: 22
  - Winter: 0
- Type: Seasonal
- Period: Summer
- Status: Operational
- Activities: List: Astrophysics; Climatology; Geodesy; Geology; Geomorphology; Glaciology; Microbiology

Princess Elisabeth Skiway
- IATA: none; ICAO: AT99

Summary
- Airport type: Private
- Location: Utsteinen Nunatak; Queen Maud Land
- Coordinates: 71°57′27″S 23°13′12″E
- Website: antarcticstation.org

Map
- Location of airfield in Antarctica

Runways
Direction	Length		Surface
Direction	ft	m	Surface
	4,650	1,420	Blue Ice

Princess Elisabeth Antarctica, located on Utsteinen Nunatak in Queen Maud Land, is a Belgian scientific polar research station, which went into service on 15 February 2009.

== History ==
The station, designed, built and operated by the International Polar Foundation, is the first polar base that combines eco-friendly construction materials, clean and efficient energy use, optimization of the station's energy consumption and waste-management techniques.

Testing phase in Brussels and building construction in Antarctica was coordinated by Belgian main contractor BESIX.

The station is built against a ridge (The Utsteinen ridge) that is exposed to gales of up to 300 kilometres per hour (190 mph). The station can withstand such strong winds through its aerodynamic shape and its foundation anchoring of several metres deep into the permafrost. Project manager and designer Johan Berte and architect Ann Lommaert, were involved in designing the shell and underlying structure. The upper deck of the building is the actual station and looks over the ridge edge. The lower deck contains a garage for snowcat vehicles and other utilities.

The Princess Elisabeth base is the only zero-emission base on the Antarctic, and runs on solar and wind energy through the use of a micro smart grid, which has lead-acid batteries as well as backup generators. The station is connected to nine wind turbines that stretch out along the Utsteinen ridge. As of February 2023, the station also houses the only electric exploration vehicle in the Antarctic, the Venturi Antarctica, which has been in-service since December 2021. The station houses up to 16 scientists at a time.

The station is named after Princess Elisabeth, Duchess of Brabant, the eldest daughter of King Philippe of Belgium.

11 of 30 of the base's personnel contracted COVID-19 in December 2021 despite having been vaccinated. The first case was a person who had arrived on 7 December and tested positive on 14 December. The cases were mild, and as of 1 January 2022 none were expected to be evacuated on a flight scheduled for 12 January 2022.

=== Ownership dispute ===
There was a protracted dispute between the government of Belgium and the explorer Alain Hubert as to which party controls the base. The Belgian Government has alleged financial mismanagement by the base's private operators, the International Polar Foundation. Disputes over ownership and control of the base have led to a reduction in scientific research being undertaken at the base. As per L'Echo, the head of the Belgian Federal Science Policy Office, René Delcourt, has stated that no Belgian scientists would be sent to the station in 2017.

The dispute was resolved on 9 June 2017 as a judgement ruled by the Belgian Council of State. Publicly announced on 30 June 2017 as the "Pax Antarctica", the settlement between the International Polar Foundation and the Belgian government includes the Belgian government fully owning the base, the International Polar Foundation receiving contracts to operate the base for the next six years, and a cessation of all legal proceedings. Research work resumed in November 2017, with 24 scientists from twelve countries expected at the base.

== See also ==
- Belgian Antarctic Program
- List of Antarctic research stations
- List of Antarctic field camps
- List of airports in Antarctica
