= Swithinbank (surname) =

Swithinbank is a surname and may refer to:

- Anne Swithinbank (born 1957), horticulturist.
- Charles Swithinbank (1926–2014), British glaciologist.
- Harold William Swithinbank (1858–1928), British veterinarian and military officer
