= Nipe Formation =

Geologic formation in Cuba

- Stratigraphic range: Paleogene
- Type: Formation

Location
- Country: Cuba

The Nipe Formation is a geologic formation in Cuba. It preserves fossils dating back to the Paleogene period.

== See also ==
- List of fossiliferous stratigraphic units in Cuba
