= Skuggekammen Ridge =

Rock ridge in Antarctica

Skuggekammen Ridge (71°23′S 13°40′E) is a jagged rock ridge extending southeastward from Mount Mentzel, in the Gruber Mountains of the Wohlthat Mountains, Queen Maud Land. Discovered and plotted from air photos by German Antarctic Expedition, 1938–39. Replotted from air photos and surveys by Norwegian Antarctic Expedition, 1956–60, and named Skuggekammen (the shade ridge).
