= Ichime Glacier =

Glacier in Antarctica

- Location of Queen Maud Land in Antarctica

- Location within Antarctica
- Location: Queen Maud Land
- Coordinates: 68°23′S 42°8′E
- Thickness: unknown
- Status: unknown

Ichime Glacier (68°23′S 42°8′E) is a glacier flowing to the sea just west of Kasumi Rock in Queen Maud Land, Antarctica. It was mapped from surveys and air photos by members of the Japanese Antarctic Research Expedition, 1957–1962, who also gave the glacier its name.

== See also ==
- List of glaciers in the Antarctic
- Glaciology
