= Mjell Glacier =

Glacier in Antarctica

- Location of Queen Maud Land in Antarctica

- Location within Antarctica
- Location: Queen Maud Land
- Coordinates: 72°7′S 26°6′E
- Length: 9 nmi (17 km; 10 mi)
- Thickness: unknown
- Terminus: Sør Rondane Mountains
- Status: unknown

Mjell Glacier (72°7′S 26°6′E) is a glacier 9 nautical miles (17 km) long, flowing northeast between Mount Bergersen and Isachsen Mountain in the Sør Rondane Mountains of Antarctica. It was mapped by Norwegian cartographers in 1957 from air photos taken by U.S. Navy Operation Highjump in 1946–47, and named "Mjellbreen" (the dry-snow glacier).

== See also ==
- List of glaciers in the Antarctic
- Glaciology
