= Swithinbank Slope =

Ice slope in Queen Maud Land, Antarctica

Coordinates: 73°28′S 2°12′W

Swithinbank Slope is a semi-circular ice slope, about 25 nautical miles (46 km) long, between Mount Hallgren and Newmayer Cliffs in the Kirwan Escarpment of Queen Maud Land. Mapped by Norwegian cartographers from surveys and air photos by Norwegian-British-Swedish Antarctic Expedition (NBSAE) (1949–52) and air photos by the Norwegian expedition (1958–59). Named for Charles W. Swithinbank, glaciologist with NBSAE.

== See also ==
- Skarvhalsen Saddle
