= Kasumi Glacier =

Glacier in Antarctica

- Location of Queen Maud Land in Antarctica

- Location within Antarctica
- Location: Queen Maud Land
- Coordinates: 68°20′S 42°21′E
- Thickness: unknown
- Status: unknown

Kasumi Glacier is a wide glacier flowing to the sea just east of Kasumi Rock in Queen Maud Land, Antarctica. It was mapped from surveys and air photos by the Japanese Antarctic Research Expedition, 1957–62, who gave the name.

== See also ==
- List of glaciers in the Antarctic
- Glaciology
