= Wagenheim =

Wagenheim is a German-language surname. Notable people with the surname include:

- Charles Wagenheim (1896–1979), American actor
- Konstantin Wagenheim, birth name of Konstantin Vaginov (1899–1934), Russian poet and novelist

== See also ==
- Wangenheim (surname)
