= Gluvreklett Glacier =

Glacier in Antarctica

- Location of Queen Maud Land in Antarctica

- Location within Antarctica
- Location: Queen Maud Land
- Coordinates: 72°14′S 2°35′E
- Thickness: unknown
- Terminus: Gjelsvik Mountains
- Status: unknown

Gluvreklett Glacier (72°14′S 2°35′E) is a glacier flowing northwest between Von Essen Mountain and Terningskarvet Mountain in the Gjelsvik Mountains of Queen Maud Land, Antarctica. It was photographed from the air by the Third German Antarctic Expedition (1938–39). It was mapped by Norwegian cartographers from surveys and photos by the Norwegian–British–Swedish Antarctic Expedition (1949–52) and the Norwegian expedition (1958–59) and named Gluvreklettbreen.

== See also ==
- List of glaciers in the Antarctic
- Glaciology
