= Nashornet Mountain =

Mountain in Queen Maud Land, Antarctica

Nashornet Mountain (72°22′S 2°0′W) is a mountain 6 nautical miles (11 km) northeast of Viddalskollen Hill, on the south side of Viddalen Valley in Queen Maud Land. Mapped by Norwegian cartographers from surveys and air photos by Norwegian-British-Swedish Antarctic Expedition (NBSAE) (1949–52) and air photos by the Norwegian expedition (1958–59) and named Nashornet (the rhinoceros).
