= Charles Glacier =

Glacier in Antarctica

- Location of Queen Maud Land in Antarctica

- Location within Antarctica
- Type: steep
- Location: Queen Maud Land
- Coordinates: 72°34′S 3°26′E
- Thickness: unknown
- Terminus: Borg Massif
- Status: unknown

Charles Glacier (72°34′S 3°26′W) is a small, steep glacier draining the south side of Borg Mountain, in the Borg Massif of Queen Maud Land. It was mapped by Norwegian cartographers from surveys and from air photos by the Norwegian–British–Swedish Antarctic Expedition (NBSAE) (1949–52) and named for Charles W. Swithinbank, a glaciologist with NBSAE.

== See also ==
- List of glaciers in the Antarctic
- Glaciology
