= Oku-iwa Glacier =

Glacier in Antarctica

- Location of Queen Maud Land in Antarctica

- Location within Antarctica
- Location: Queen Maud Land
- Coordinates: 68°42′S 40°45′E
- Thickness: unknown
- Status: unknown

Oku-iwa Glacier (68°42′S 40°46′E) is a glacier flowing to the sea just west of Oku-iwa Rock on the coast of Queen Maud Land. Mapped from surveys and air photos by Japanese Antarctic Research Expedition (JARE), 1957–62, and named after nearby Oku-iwa Rock.

== See also ==
- List of glaciers in the Antarctic
- Glaciology
- Ko-iwa Rock
