= Borchgrevinkisen =

Glacier in Antarctica

Borchgrevinkisen Glacier
- Location of Queen Maud Land in Antarctica

- Location within Antarctica
- Location: Queen Maud Land
- Coordinates: 72°10′S 21°30′E
- Thickness: unknown
- Terminus: northward to Taggen Nunatak west end to Sør Rondane Mountains
- Status: unknown

Borchgrevinkisen is a glacier flowing northward to the west of Taggen Nunatak, at the west end of the Sør Rondane Mountains. It was mapped by Norwegian cartographers in 1957 from air photos taken by U.S. Navy Operation Highjump, 1946–47, and named for Carsten E. Borchgrevink, Norwegian leader of the British Antarctic Expedition, 1898–1900.

== See also ==
- List of glaciers in the Antarctic
- Glaciology
