= Hansenbreen =

Glacier in Antarctica

Hansenbreen Glacier
- Location of Queen Maud Land in Antarctica

- Location within Antarctica
- Type: cirque glacier
- Location: Queen Maud Land
- Coordinates: 72°6′S 22°45′E
- Length: 15 nmi (28 km; 17 mi)
- Thickness: unknown
- Terminus: Sør Rondane Mountains
- Status: unknown

Hansenbreen (72°6′S 22°45′E) is a glacier 15 nautical miles (28 km) long, flowing north along the west side of Mount Nils Larsen in the Sør Rondane Mountains of Antarctica. It was roughly mapped by Norwegian cartographers from air photos taken by the Lars Christensen Expedition, 1936–37, and remapped by them in greater detail in 1957 from air photos taken by U.S. Navy Operation Highjump, 1946–47. It was named for Hans Edvard Hansen, a Norwegian cartographer who compiled these and other maps for Norwegian Antarctic expeditions.

== See also ==
- List of glaciers in the Antarctic
- Glaciology
