= Koms Glacier =

Glacier in Antarctica

- Location of Queen Maud Land in Antarctica

- Location within Antarctica
- Location: Queen Maud Land
- Coordinates: 73°3′S 25°18′E
- Length: 5 nmi (9 km; 6 mi)
- Thickness: unknown
- Terminus: Sør Rondane Mountains
- Status: unknown

Koms Glacier (72°3′S 25°18′E) is a glacier, 5 nautical miles (9 km) long, flowing north between Mefjell Mountain and Komsa Mountain in the Sør Rondane Mountains of Antarctica. It was mapped by Norwegian cartographers in 1957 from air photos taken by U.S. Navy Operation Highjump, 1946–47, and named Komsbreen (the Lapp cradle glacier).

== See also ==
- List of glaciers in the Antarctic
- Glaciology
- Antarctic
- Little America
