= Kreitzerisen =

Glacier in Antarctica

Kreitzerisen Glacier
- Location of Queen Maud Land in Antarctica

- Location within Antarctica
- Location: Queen Maud Land
- Coordinates: 72°13′S 22°10′E
- Length: 8 nmi (15 km; 9 mi)
- Thickness: unknown
- Terminus: Sør Rondane Mountains
- Status: unknown

Kreitzerisen is a glacier, 8 nautical miles (15 km) long, flowing north between the Tertene Nunataks and Bamse Mountain in the Sør Rondane Mountains of Antarctica. It was mapped by Norwegian cartographers in 1957 from air photos taken by U.S. Navy Operation Highjump, 1946–47, and named for Lieutenant William R. Kreitzer, U.S. Navy, plane commander on one of the three Operation Highjump aerial crews which photographed this and other coastal areas between 14°E and 164°E.

== See also ==
- List of glaciers in the Antarctic
- Glaciology
