= Sal Glacier =

Glacier in Antarctica

- Location of Queen Maud Land in Antarctica

- Location within Antarctica
- Location: Queen Maud Land
- Coordinates: 72°3′S 25°31′E
- Length: 7 nmi (13 km; 8 mi)
- Thickness: unknown
- Terminus: Sør Rondane Mountains
- Status: unknown

Sal Glacier (72°3′S 25°31′E) is a glacier, 7 nmi (13 km; 8 mi) long, flowing north between Salen Mountain and Mount Bergersen in the Sor Rondane Mountains. It was mapped by Norwegian cartographers in 1957 from air photos taken by U.S. Navy Operation Highjump, 1946–47, and named Salbreen (the saddle glacier), probably for its association with Salen Mountain.

== See also ==
- List of glaciers in the Antarctic
- Glaciology
