= Anuchin Glacier =

Glacier in Antarctica

- Location of Queen Maud Land in Antarctica

- Location within Antarctica
- Location: Queen Maud Land
- Coordinates: 71°17′S 13°31′E
- Thickness: unknown
- Terminus: Lake Untersee
- Status: unknown

Anuchin Glacier (71°17′S 13°31′E) is a glacier draining southward to Lake Unter-See in the northern part of the Gruber Mountains, Queen Maud Land. It was discovered, and plotted from air photos, by the Third German Antarctic Expedition, 1938–39. It was mapped from air photos and from surveys by the Sixth Norwegian Antarctic Expedition, 1956–60, and remapped by the Soviet Antarctic Expedition, 1960–61, and named after Dmitry Nikolayevich Anuchin, Soviet geographer.

== See also ==
- List of glaciers in the Antarctic
- Glaciology
