= Nipe Glacier =

Glacier in Antarctica

- Location of Queen Maud Land in Antarctica

- Location within Antarctica
- Location: Queen Maud Land
- Coordinates: 71°52′S 25°15′E
- Thickness: unknown
- Terminus: Sør Rondane Mountains
- Status: unknown

Nipe Glacier (71°52′S 25°15′E) is a broad glacier between Austkampane Hills and Menipa Peak in the Sor Rondane Mountains. Mapped by Norwegian cartographers in 1957 from air photos taken by U.S. Navy Operation Highjump, 1946–47, and named Nipebreen (the mountain peak glacier).

== See also ==
- List of glaciers in the Antarctic
- Glaciology
