= Jennings Glacier =

Glacier in Antarctica

- Location of Queen Maud Land in Antarctica

- Location within Antarctica
- Location: Queen Maud Land
- Coordinates: 71°57′S 24°22′E
- Length: 10 nmi (19 km; 12 mi)
- Thickness: unknown
- Terminus: Sør Rondane Mountains
- Status: unknown

Jennings Glacier (71°57′S 24°22′E) is a glacier, 10 nautical miles (19 km) long, flowing north along the west side of the Luncke Range in the Sør Rondane Mountains of Antarctica. It was mapped by Norwegian cartographers in 1957 from air photos taken by U.S. Navy Operation Highjump, 1946–47, and named for Lieutenant Joe C. Jennings, U.S. Navy, a co-pilot and navigator on Operation Highjump photographic flights of this and other coastal areas between 14°E and 164°E.

== See also ==
- List of glaciers in the Antarctic
- Glaciology
