= Gjel Glacier =

Glacier in Antarctica

- Location of Queen Maud Land in Antarctica

- Location within Antarctica
- Location: Queen Maud Land
- Coordinates: 71°53′S 24°55′E
- Length: 17 nmi (31 km; 20 mi)
- Thickness: unknown
- Terminus: Sør Rondane Mountains
- Status: unknown

Gjel Glacier (71°53′S 24°55′E) is a glacier, 17 nautical miles (31 km) long, flowing north between the steep cliffs of the Luncke Range and Mefjell Mountain, in the Sør Rondane Mountains of Antarctica. It was mapped by Norwegian cartographers in 1957 from air photos taken by U.S. Navy Operation Highjump, 1946–47, and named Gjelbreen (the ravine glacier).

== See also ==
- List of glaciers in the Antarctic
- Glaciology
