= Ivan Mushketov =

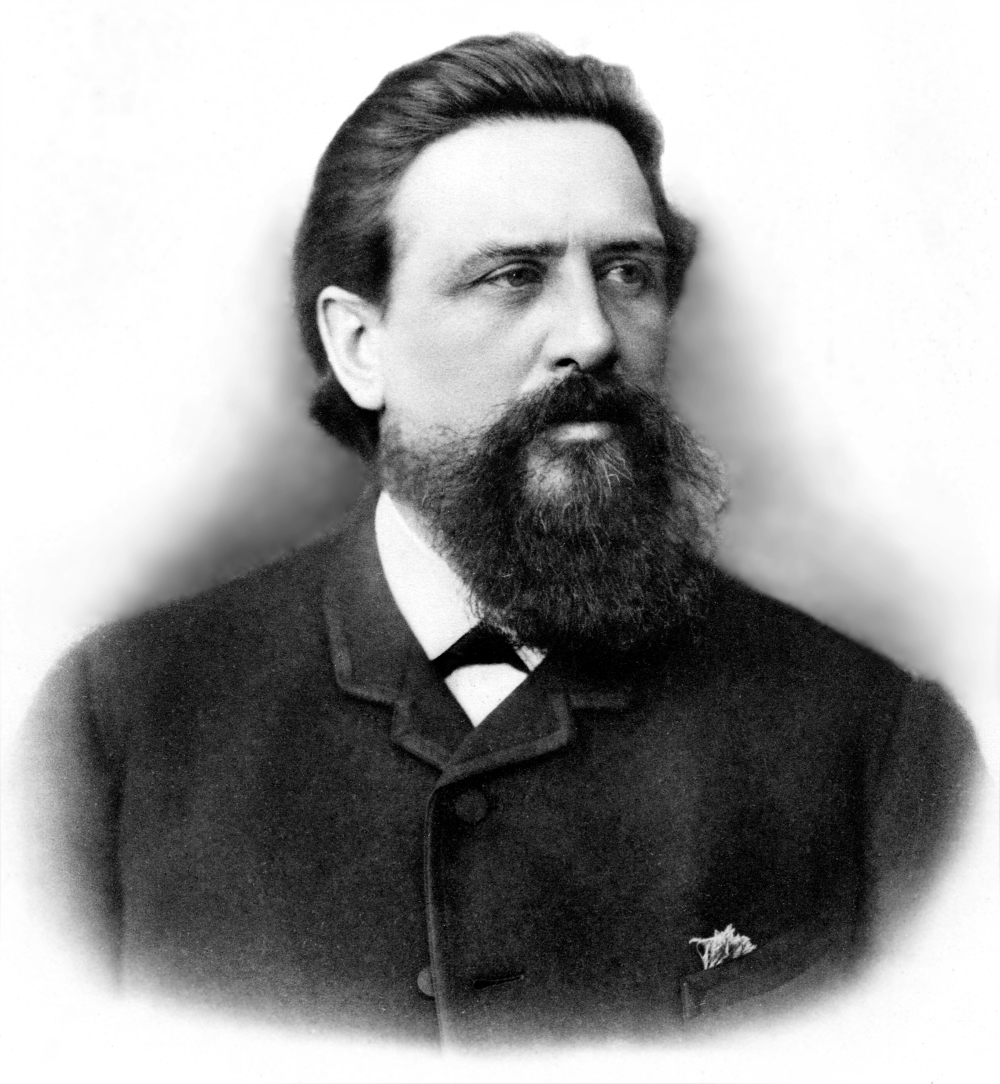
I. V. Mushketov

Ivan Vasilʹevich Mushketov (Russian: Иван Васильевич Мушкетов; 1850–1902) was a famous geologist, tectonist, explorer, and geographer from the Russian Empire.

== Biography ==
Mushketov was born 9 (21 New Style) January 1850 in the Dango Cossack area of the Don region and entered Saint Petersburg University in 1867, but soon transferred to the Mining Institute where he was a student of A. P. Karpinsky, and graduated from there in 1872.

Upon graduation in 1872 he began his "continuous, almost uninterrupted explorations of Russia" and China which included a 6-year term (beginning 1873) as a mining attaché to the Governor General of Turkestan. The areas visited in 1874-80 included the Tian Shan, Pamir-Alay, Ural, Dzungarian Alatau, Ferghana, and Seraf Shan mountains, the Turan Valley and the Samarkand-Andijan region. These remarkable journeys resulted in numerous scientific papers, important geological maps including the first geological map of Turkestan (with S. D. Romanovsky), and corrected much in the traveler's reports of Alexander von Humboldt and Ferdinand von Richthofen.

In 1877 Mushketov received his doctorate (thesis on the mountain area of Zlatoust) and the same year was named an adjunct professor at the Mining Institute. He also taught at the Institute of Transport from 1882 and at the Women's Academy of St. Petersburg from 1892.

Mushketov received the Konstantin Medal of the Imperial Russian Geographical Society in 1880. He was a geologist from 1882 to 1897 with the Geological Committee of the State Geological Survey of Russia. From 1885 he was Director of the Department of Physical Geography of the Imperial Russian Geographical Society. In 1887 he investigated the aftermath of the Verny earthquake in Bashkiria (now Bashkortostan). He also studied the area of Astrakhan, mineral springs, salt lakes in Crimea, and organized regular observation of glaciers in the Caucasus.

in 1898-99 he conducted the third survey of prospective routes for the Circum-Baikal Railway.

Mushketov died of pneumonia in St. Petersburg on 10 (23) January 1902.

== Works ==
- Mineral Riches of Russian Turkestan (1878)
- Geological Map of Turkestan (with S.D. Romanovsky, 1884)
- Turkestan (1886, 1906)
- Physical Geology (1888, 1891)
- Geological Prospects Along Circumbaikal Line (1904, 1910)

== Remembrance ==
The Mushketov Glacier (Antarctica), Gora Mushketova (Antarctica) the Mushketov Glacier in the Tian Shan mountain range, and Gora Mushketova (Mushketov Mountain, the Mountain Peak of the Vitim Tableland, Buriyatia) are named after him. He was the father of D. I. Mushketov, who, like his father, specialized in the geology of Central Asia and studied both earthquakes and glaciation.
