= Mendeleyev Glacier =

Glacier in Antarctica

- Location of Queen Maud Land in Antarctica

- Location within Antarctica
- Location: Queen Maud Land
- Coordinates: 71°55′S 14°33′E
- Length: 10 nmi (19 km; 12 mi)
- Thickness: unknown
- Terminus: Payer Mountains
- Status: unknown

Mendeleyev Glacier (71°55′S 14°33′E) is a glacier, 10 nautical miles (19 km) long, draining northeast through the northern outcrops of the Payer Mountains, in Queen Maud Land, Antarctica. It was mapped from air photos and surveys by the Soviet Antarctic Expedition, 1960–61, and named after Russian chemist Dmitri Mendeleev, whose surname may also be transliterated as "Mendeleyev".

== See also ==
- List of glaciers in the Antarctic
- Glaciology
