= Fimbul Ice Shelf =

Ice shelf in Antarctica

Coordinates: 70°30′S 0°10′W

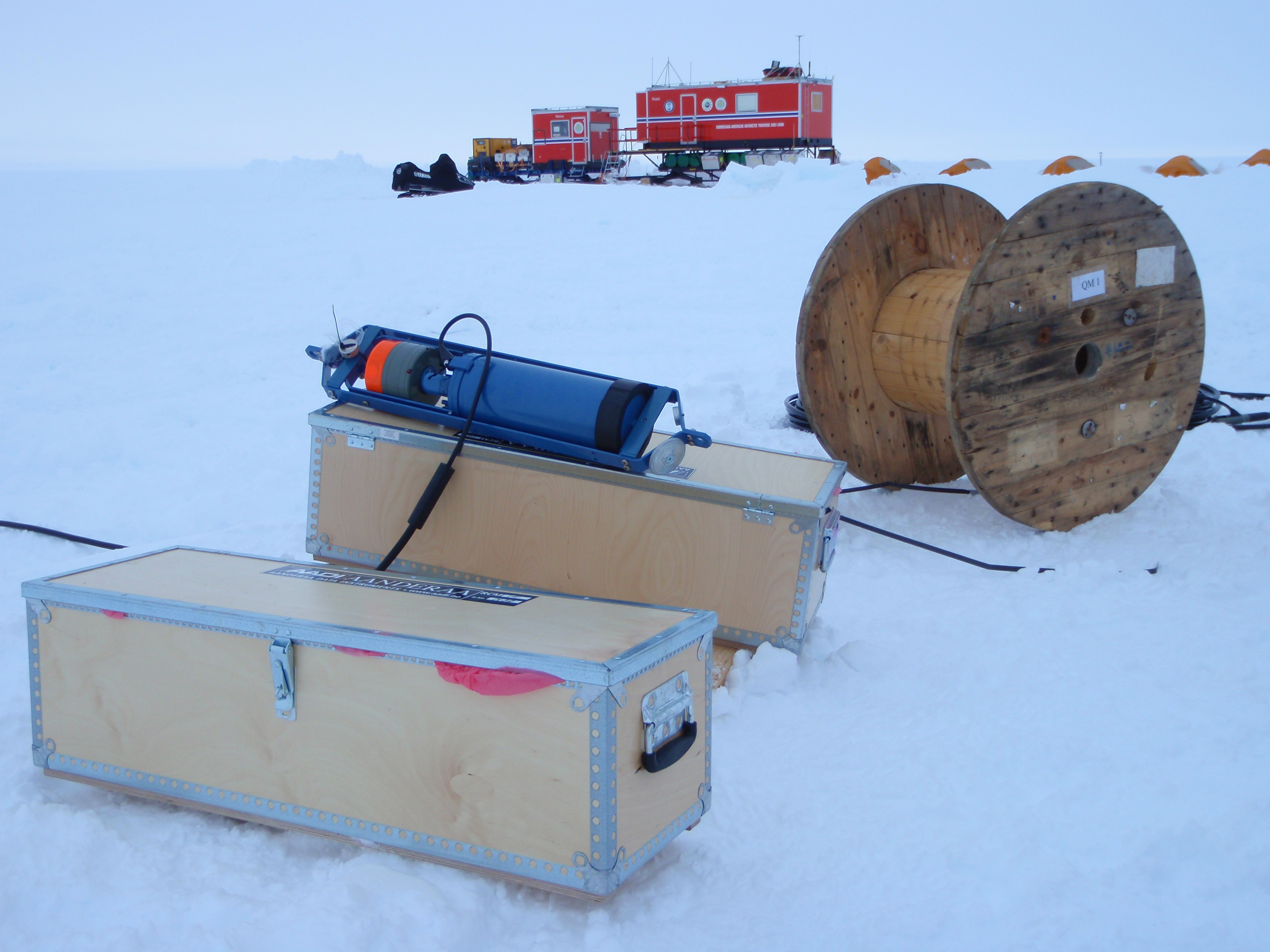
In December 2009 new oceanographic moorings were deployed below the Fimbul ice shelf in the project Fimbul Ice Shelf – Top to Bottom.

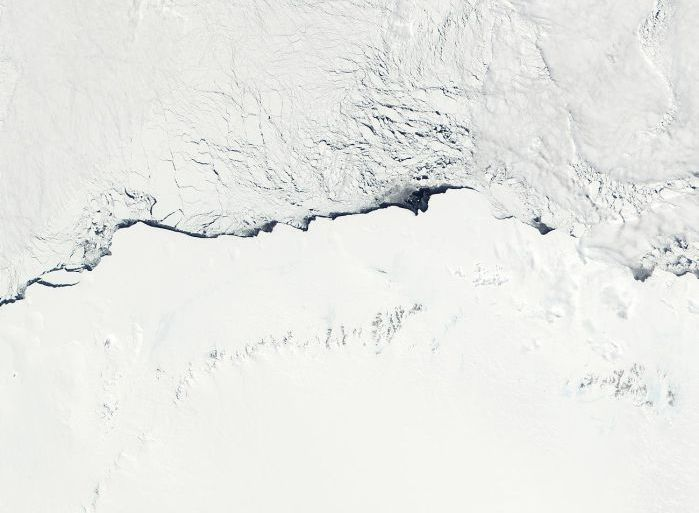
Fimbul shelf ice at the Märta and Astrid coasts.

The Fimbul Ice Shelf is an Antarctic ice shelf about 200 km (120 mi) long and 100 km (60 mi) wide, nourished by Jutulstraumen Glacier, bordering the coast of Queen Maud Land from 3°W to 3°E. It was photographed from the air by the Third German Antarctic Expedition (1938–1939), mapped by Norwegian cartographers from surveys and air photos by the Norwegian–British–Swedish Antarctic Expedition (1949–1952) and from air photos by the Norwegian expedition (1958–1959) and named Fimbulisen (the giant ice).
