= Hålisstonga Peak =

Mountain in Antarctica

Hålisstonga Peak (72°2′S 8°57′E) is a peak, 2,780 metres (9,120 ft) high, marking the south end of the Kurze Mountains in Queen Maud Land, Antarctica. It was mapped and named by Norwegian cartographers from surveys and air photos by the Sixth Norwegian Antarctic Expedition (1956–60).
