= Vangengeym Glacier =

Glacier in Antarctica

- Location of Queen Maud Land in Antarctica

- Location within Antarctica
- Location: Queen Maud Land
- Coordinates: 71°17′S 13°48′E
- Length: 6 nmi (11 km; 7 mi)
- Thickness: unknown
- Terminus: Gruber Mountains
- Status: unknown

Vangengeym Glacier (71°17′S 13°48′E) is a glacier about 6 nautical miles (11 km) long, draining the vicinity east of Mount Mentzel and flowing north toward Mount Seekopf in the Gruber Mountains, Queen Maud Land. It was discovered and plotted from air photos by the German Antarctic Expedition, 1938–39, and was mapped from air photos and surveys by the Norwegian Antarctic Expedition, 1956–60; remapped by Soviet Antarctic Expedition, 1960–61 and named after Soviet meteorologist Georgiy Vangengeym (1886–1961).

== See also ==
- List of glaciers in the Antarctic
- Glaciology
