= Mushketov Glacier (Antarctica) =

Glacier in Antarctica

- Location of Queen Maud Land in Antarctica

- Location within Antarctica
- Location: Queen Maud Land
- Coordinates: 71°20′S 14°55′E
- Thickness: unknown
- Terminus: Lomonosov Mountains
- Status: unknown

Mushketov Glacier (71°20′S 14°55′E) is a large glacier trending northeastward, draining the area between the Wohlthat Mountains on the west and the Weyprecht, Payer and Lomonosov Mountains on the east, in Queen Maud Land. Discovered and plotted from air photos by German Antarctic Expedition, 1938–39. Replotted from air photos and surveys by Soviet Antarctic Expedition, 1958–59, and named after Ivan V. Mushketov (1850–1902), Russian geologist and geographer.

== See also ==
- List of glaciers in the Antarctic
- Glaciology
