= Jutulstraumen Glacier =

Glacier in Antarctica

Coordinates: 71°35′S 00°30′W

Jutulstraumen Glacier is a large glacier in Queen Maud Land, Antarctica, about 120 nautical miles (220 km) long, draining northward to the Fimbul Ice Shelf between the Kirwan Escarpment, Borg Massif and Ahlmann Ridge on the west and the Sverdrup Mountains on the east.

== History ==
It was mapped by Norwegian cartographers from surveys and air photos by the Norwegian–British–Swedish Antarctic Expedition (1949–52) and air photos by the Norwegian expedition (1958–59) and named Jutulstraumen (the giant's stream). More specifically, jutulen are troll-like figures from Norwegian folk tales. The ice stream reaches speeds of around 4 metres per day near the coast where it is heavily crevassed.

== See also ==
- List of glaciers in the Antarctic
- List of Antarctic ice streams
