= Research stations in Queen Maud Land =

- Antarctic bases
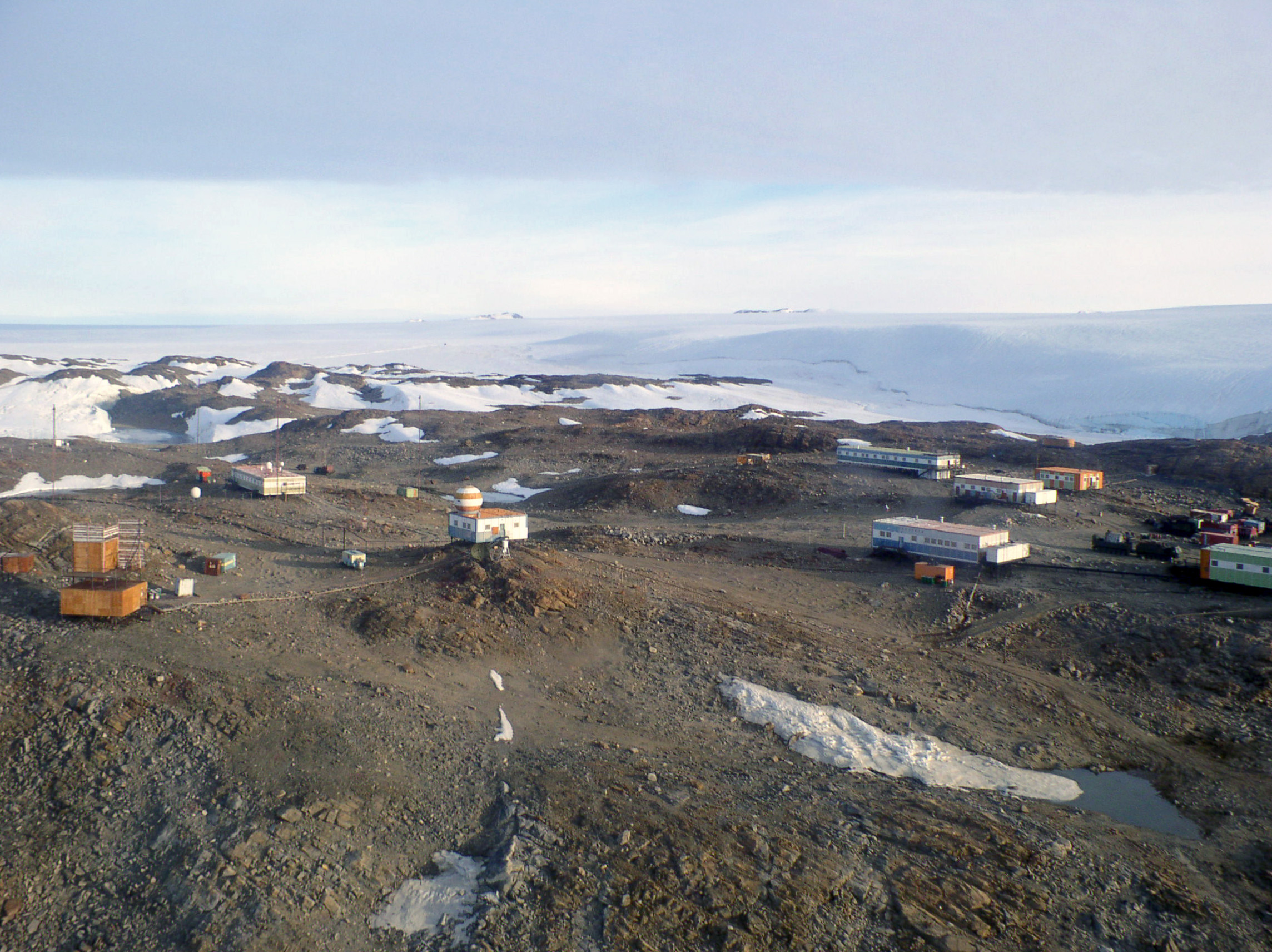
- Novolazarevskaya, one of the research stations in Queen Maud Land, pictured during summer, in February 2006.

- Location of Queen Maud Land research stations in Antarctica. Legend: Wasa (Sweden) and Aboa (Finland); Neumayer Station III (Germany); Kohnen (Germany); SANAE IV (South Africa); Troll and Tor (Norway); Maitri (India) and nearby Novolazarevskaya (Russia); Princess Elisabeth (Belgium); Showa (Japan); Dome Fuji (Japan)

Research stations in Queen Maud Land are connected by the Dronning Maud Land Air Network Project (DROMLAN), which is a cooperative agreement for transportation between eleven nations with research stations in East Antarctica. Long-range aircraft fly between Cape Town, South Africa and either the Troll Airfield, located at the Troll research station, or the runway at the Novolazarevskaya Station. From these two main airfields, smaller aircraft may fly further to other Antarctic destinations.

Through the Troll Airfield, Norway's Troll station serves as a major hub of the DROMLAN network. Research at Troll include air and atmospheric measurements, monitoring of greenhouse gases and bird colonies, as well as meteorological and climate research. The other Norwegian station, Tor, was established for researching birds at the breeding colony in Svarthamaren Mountain. Activities conducted by Russia's Novolazarevskaya Station include environmental monitoring, geodesy/mapping, geomagnetic and meteorological observations, glaciology, biology, ionospheric / auroral observations, limnology, geology, geophysics and seismology.

== SANAE IV ==
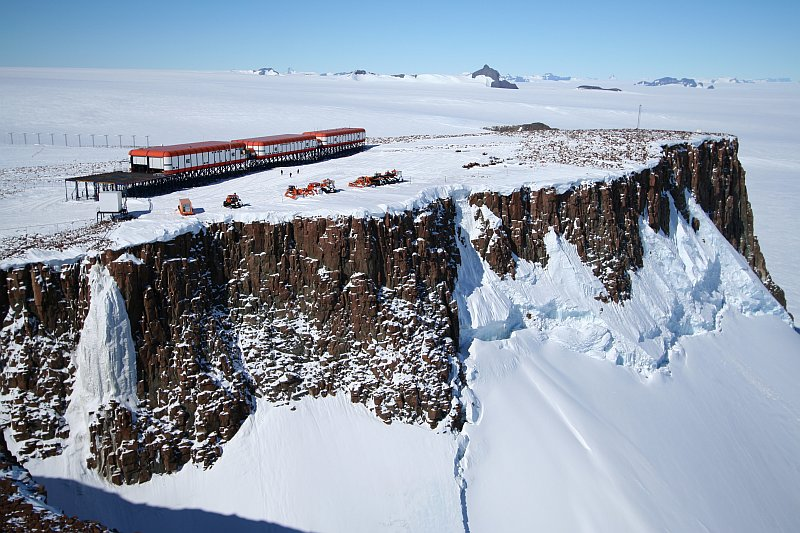
The SANAE IV station

South Africa's SANAE IV station, the successor to three former stations, was completed in 1997. Research at SANAE IV include invasion biology/ecology, geology, geomorphology and atmospheric sciences. Its facilities include a small hospital and a two-helicopter hangar. SANAE IV consists of three linked modules, each double-story, 44 metres (144 ft) long and 14 metres (46 ft) wide. Two smaller nearby structures contain the satellite dish used for communications and the diesel fuel bunkers. Joined end-on-end in a north–south orientation, the base modules are complemented on the northern end by a large raised helicopter landing area with a lifting section allowing vehicles to be brought up into the hangar for maintenance. C-block, the northernmost module, contains the neutron monitors of the North-West University. The modules are linked by single-story connections that also serve as entrances with stairways down to the surface 4m below the base. Each link contains an entrance hall with two sets of doors (creating a rudimentary 'air-lock' to prevent excessive cooling when entering and exiting the base) as well as a change-room, ablution facility and electronic distribution boards. The base is staffed and maintained year-round by a team of scientists and support personnel. Each overwintering team arrives during the summer expedition and take-over period aboard the research and logistics vessel S. A. Agulhas II, stays at the base through the austral winter and returns to South Africa at the end of the next summer season - an expedition of approximately 16 months.

== Nordenskiöld Base ==
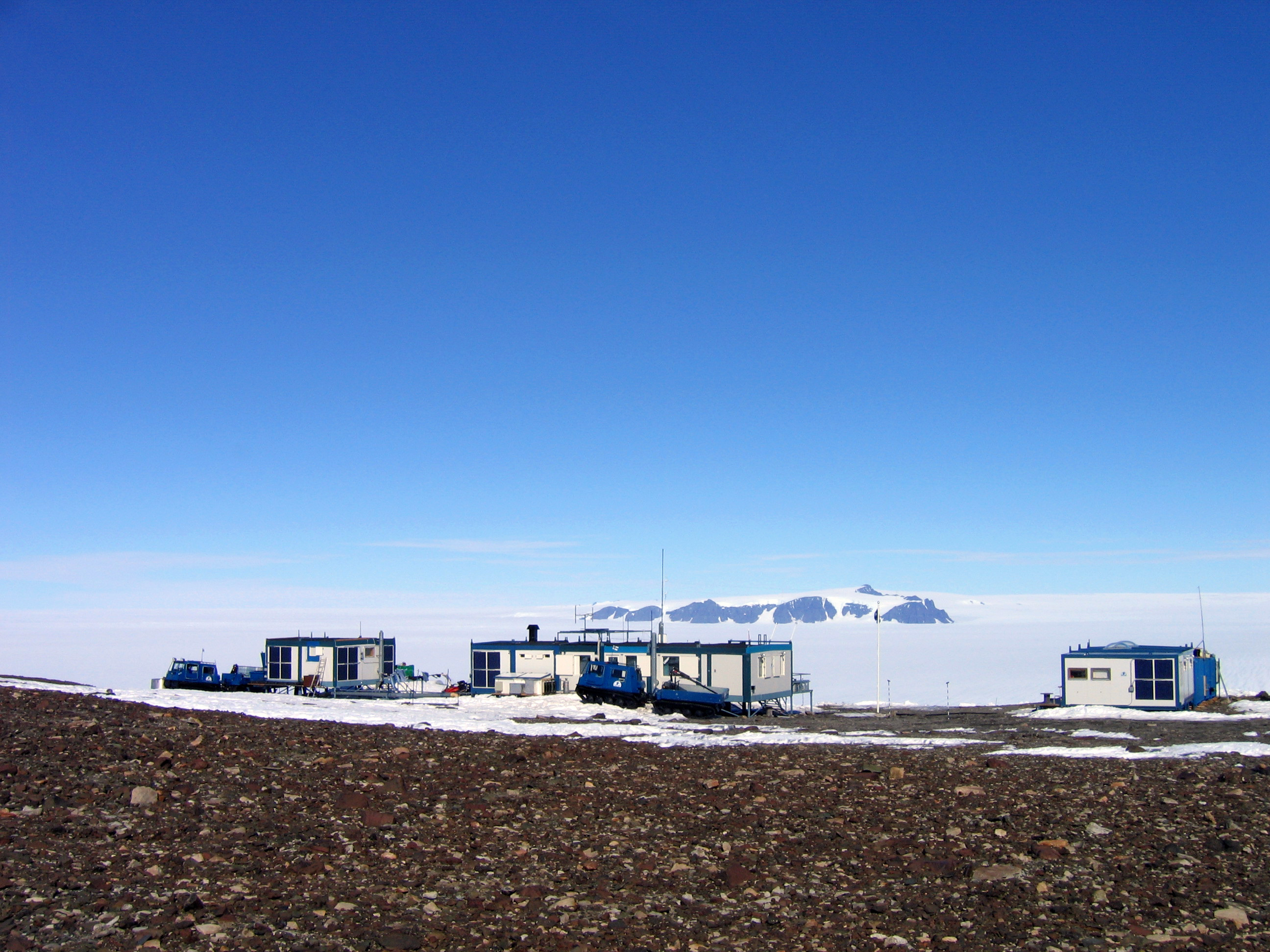
The Aboa station, part of the Nordenskiöld Base.

The Swedish Wasa station and the Finnish Aboa station together make up the Nordenskiöld Base, and cooperate in research and logistics. Research carried out includes geodesy/mapping, glaciology, human biology, meteorological observations, geology and geophysics.

== Neumayer Station III ==
The German Neumayer Station III, finished in 2009, succeeded two former stations that were buried by snow and ice. It conducts geophysical, meteorological and seismological research, as well as air chemistry measurements and atmospheric ozone monitoring. Germany's other station, Kohnen, was opened as part of a major ice-drilling project.

It is named after geophysicist Georg von Neumayer. The station's assembly kit was transported to its current position early in November 2007. It is moving with the shelf ice at about 200 meters per year towards the open sea. After almost ten years of work on the project, beginning in October 1999, including conception, environmental impact assessment, planning and construction phases, regular operation of the station began on 20 February 2009. The station replaces the Neumayer Station II and the Georg von Neumayer Station that preceded it. The expected lifespan of the station is 25 to 30 years and the entire project is estimated to cost €39 million.

== Maitri ==
Maitri station succeeded Dakshin Gangotri station in 1989, India's first Antarctic base. Maitri's research focus on geology, and the study of the supercontinent Gondwana, when India and Antarctica belonged to the same landmass. It also includes low-temperature engineering research that is relevant to conditions in the Himalayas.

== Showa Station ==
Showa Station is Japan's main research station in Antarctica. A vast array of research is conducted there, including upper atmosphere physics, meteorology, seismology, gravimetry, geodesy/mapping, oceanography, glaciology, geology, marine and terrestrial biology, and medical research. Japan's other station, Dome Fuji Station was opened as part of a major ice-coring project. It mainly studies climate change and conducts deep drilling and atmospheric observations.

== Princess Elisabeth Antarctica ==
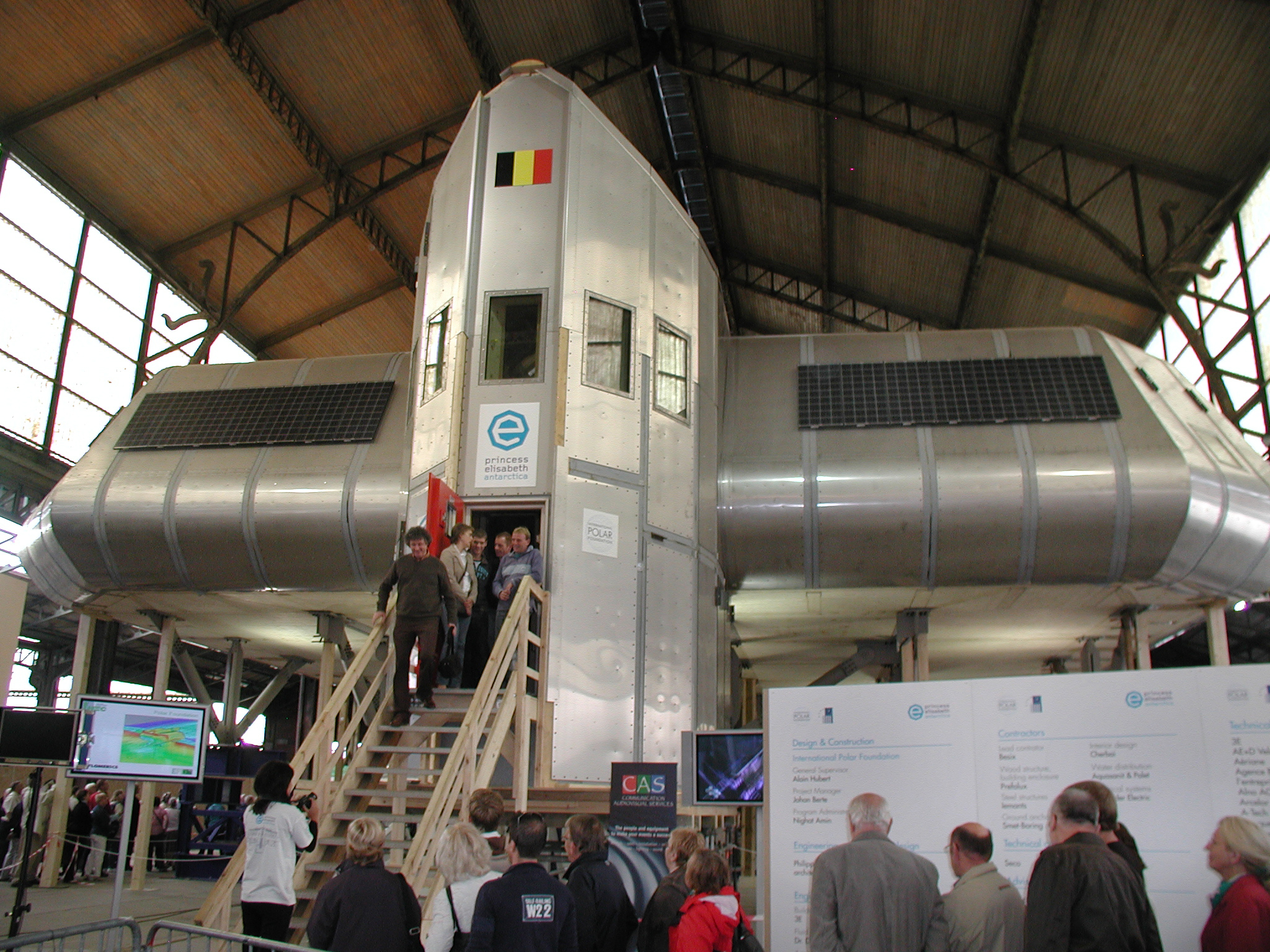
Princess Elisabeth Base.

Princess Elisabeth Antarctica was established by Belgium as a project to promote polar sciences, as well as to demonstrate the possibility of building a Zero emission station. Research is conducted by an international team of scientists, studying climatology, glaciology and microbiology. It went into service on February 15, 2009. The station, designed, built and operated by the International Polar Foundation, is the first polar base that combines eco-friendly construction materials, clean and efficient energy use, optimization of the station's energy consumption and clever waste management techniques through the use of a micro smart grid. The station is connected to nine wind turbines that stretch out along the Utsteinen ridge. It houses up to 16 scientists at a time.

The station is built against a ridge (The Utsteinen ridge) that is exposed to gales of up to 300 kilometres per hour (190 mph). The station can withstand such strong winds through its aerodynamic shape and its foundation anchoring of several metres deep into the permafrost. Philippe Samyn, a Belgian architect, was involved in designing the shell and underlying structure. The upper deck of the building is the actual station and looks over the ridge edge. The lower deck contains a garage for snowcat vehicles and other utilities. The station is named after Elisabeth, Duchess of Brabant, Princess of Belgium, the eldest daughter and heiress apparent of Philippe, King of the Belgians.

== Kohnen Station ==
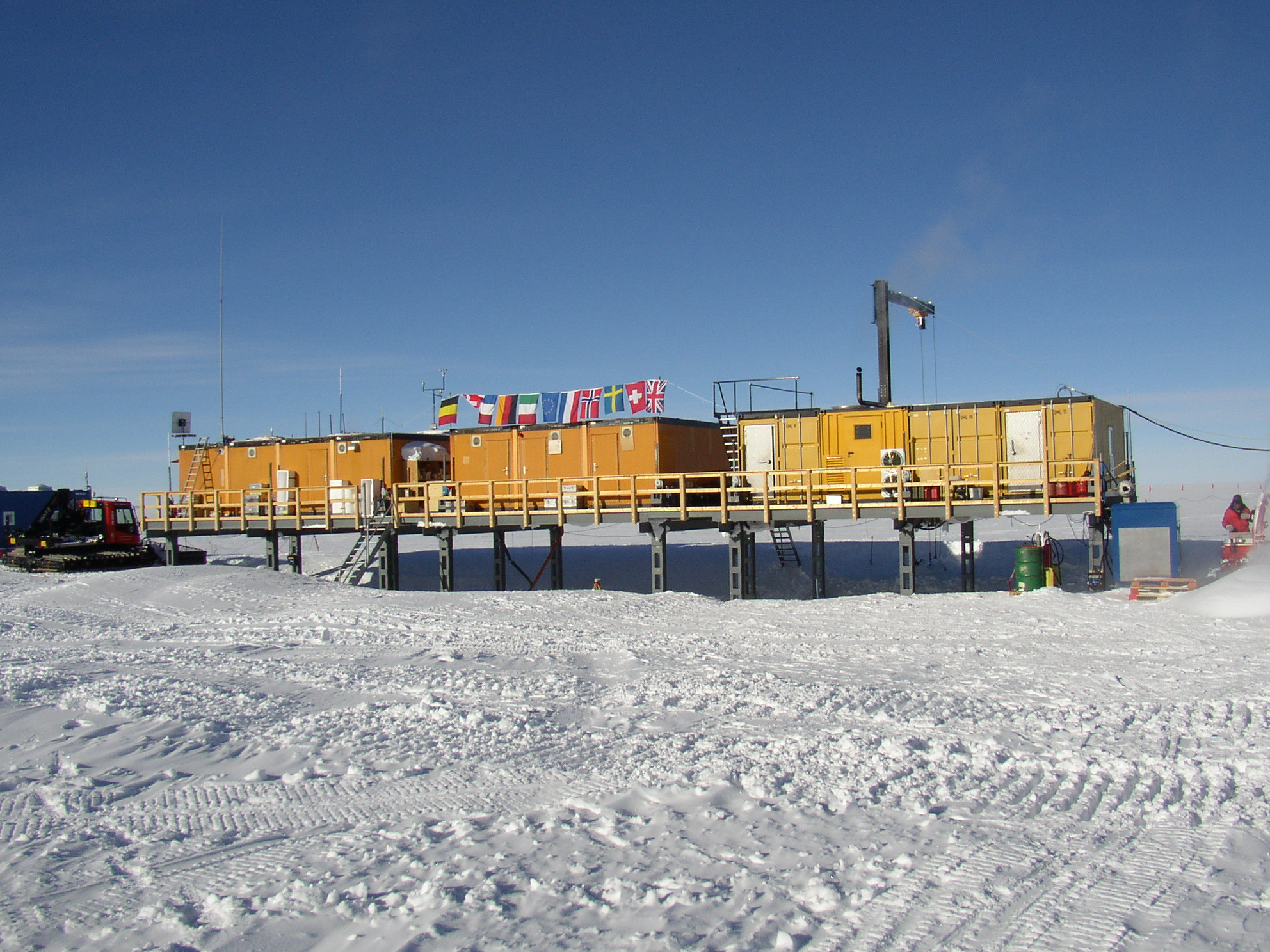
Kohnen station.

Kohnen-Station is a German summer-only station, able to accommodate up to 20 people. It is named after the geophysicist Heinz Kohnen (1938–1997), who was for a long time the head of logistics at the Alfred Wegener Institute. The station opened in 2001, and is the logistic base for the ice coring project in Dronning Maud Land, the European Project for Ice Coring in Antarctica (EPICA). The station is supplied by a convoy of 6 towing vehicles, which resupply it twice a year.

== List of current research stations ==
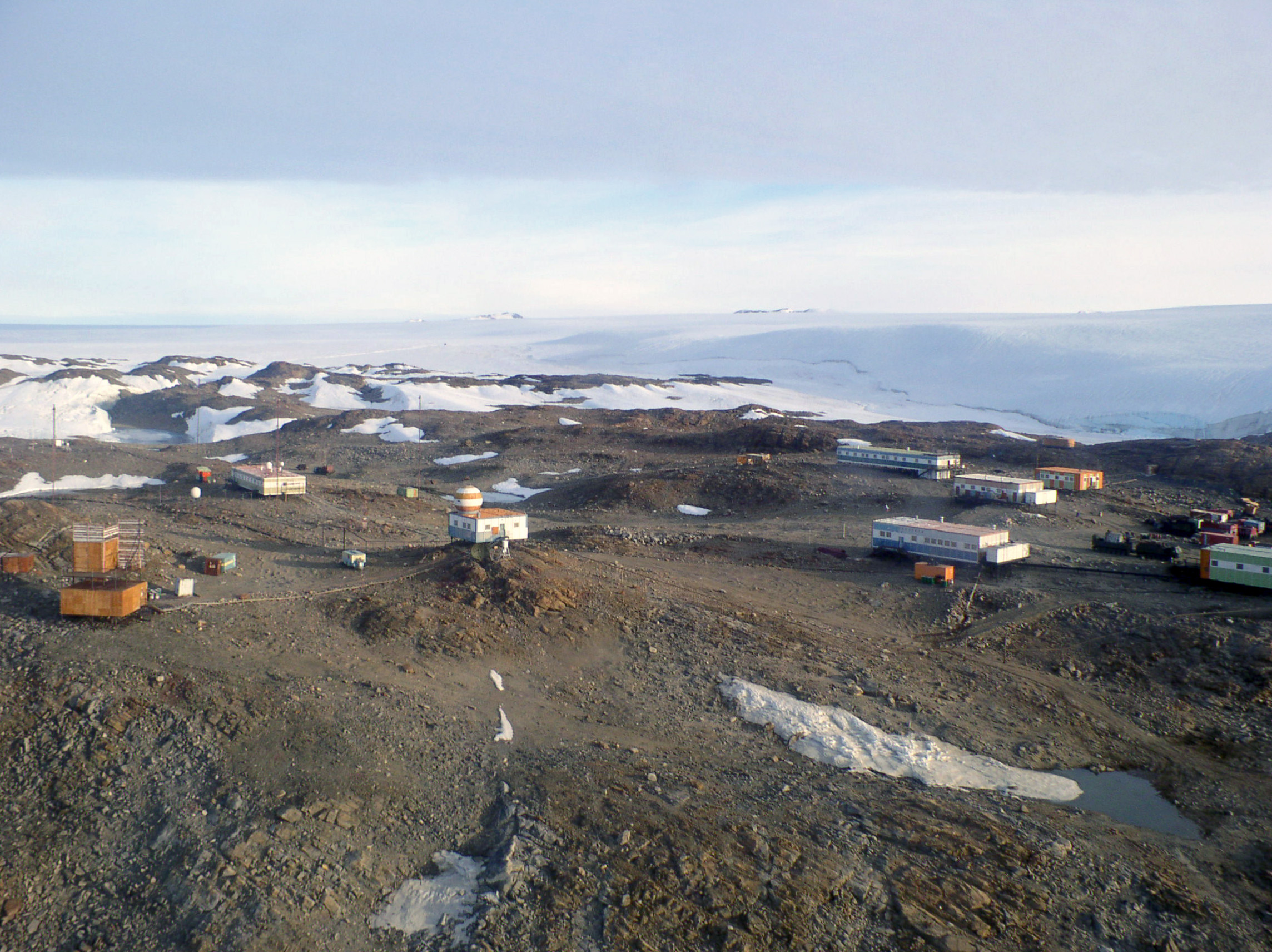
Novolazarevskaya station.

The following table lists the currently operational research stations in Queen Maud Land, sorted from westernmost to easternmost. The population figures show the winter average first (if applicable) and the peak (or maximum capacity in the case of the newly opened Princess Elisabeth Base) population last.

Detailed list of current research outposts
Research station	Country	Est.	Type	Pop. (winter)	Pop. (peak)	Coordinates	Altitude	
Research station	Country	Est.	Type	Pop. (winter)	Pop. (peak)	Coordinates	m	ft
Wasa (Nordenskiöld Base)	Sweden	1989	Seasonal	0	20	73°03′S 13°25′W	400	1,300
Aboa (Nordenskiöld Base)	Finland	1989	Seasonal	0	20	73°03′S 13°25′W	400	1,300
Neumayer Station III	Germany	1981	Year-round	9	50	70°38′S 08°16′W	40	130
SANAE IV	South Africa	1962^{a}	Year-round	10	80	71°40′S 02°50′W	841	2,759
Kohnen	Germany	2001	Seasonal	0	28	75°00′S 00°02′W	2,900	9,500
Troll	Norway	1990^{b}	Year-round	7	40	72°00′S 02°32′E	1,300	4,300
Tor	Norway	1985	Seasonal	0	4	71°53′S 05°09′E	1,625	5,331
Maitri	India	1989	Year-round	25	65	70°46′S 11°44′E	130	430
Novolazarevskaya Station	Russia	1961	Year-round	30	70	70°46′S 11°52′E	102	335
Princess Elisabeth Base	Belgium	2009	Seasonal	0	20	71°57′S 23°20′E	1,397	4,583
Showa Station	Japan	1957	Year-round	40	110	69°00′S 39°35′E	29	95
Dome Fuji Station	Japan	1995	Seasonal	0	40	77°19′S 39°42′E	3,810	12,500

^{a} While the original SANAE station was opened in 1962, the current SANAE IV station was opened in 1997, 200 kilometres (120 mi) south of the former stations.
^{b} The Troll station was in 1990 opened as a seasonal summer-only station, then for year-round operations in 2005.

== See also ==
- Research stations in Antarctica
