= Telecommunications in Antarctica =

Telecommunications in Antarctica are provided by the countries and organizations that have established research stations on the continent, and commercial satellite and mobile phone providers. There are no undersea cables connecting the continent to the outside world, so all intercontinental communication is accomplished by terrestrial or satellite radio, or physical delivery.

Antarctica is included by the International Telecommunication Union (ITU) in any of its internal administrative zones.

== Telephone communication ==
A small number of stations are connected to the public switched telephone network by radio link. Other locations use satellite phones or voice over IP for intercontinental calls. Some bases have local telephone exchanges.

=== United States bases ===
- Telephones – mobile cellular: Argentine bases have GSM networks provided by Argentinean carriers Claro and Movistar; Iridium system in use. Chile has 5G network provide by Entel company.

=== Australian and New Zealand stations ===
Five locations (Casey Station (AU), Davis Station (AU), Macquarie Island Station (AU), Mawson Station (AU) and Scott Base (NZ)) all have telephone connections that enable direct dialling to and from the outside world. Connections to the Australian stations is via the country calling code +672.

Argentinian and Chilean bases within their claims, which have families living at them, are also connected by direct dial connections.

Connection to Scott Base and the nearby United States base McMurdo Station is via the New Zealand country calling code +64 (see Telecommunications in New Zealand).

== Television ==
Television broadcast stations
- American Forces Antarctic Network at McMurdo Station, US; cable system with six channels (note: information for US bases only, 2002)
Television channels
- several hundred at McMurdo Station, US (note: information for US bases only, 2001)

== Internet ==
Internet Service Providers (ISPs): Argentine bases have WiFi provided by Argentinean internet provider Speedy (now called Movistar), a fiber cable on polar plateau which was installed in 2009.

Country code (Top level domain): .aq

Internet users: 2,700 (2021)

Facebook users: 1,800 (2021)

Data access to the Amundsen–Scott South Pole Station is provided by access via NASA's TDRS-F1, GOES & Iridium satellite constellation. Marisat F-2 provided data communications until it was retired in 2008. For the 2007–2008 season, the TDRS relay (named South Pole TDRSS Relay or SPTR) was upgraded to support a data return rate of 50 Mbit/s, which comprises over 90% of the South Pole's data capability, which is used primarily for scientific data return.

The Australian Stations each have a satellite data connection, currently contracted to Speedcast. This provides each station with a 9 Mbit/s symmetric connection.

Data and telephony access to Scott Base - New Zealand is provided via C-Band by Spark NZ & Horizons 3E. As of April 2023, Starlink services were also being trialed at the base.

Regarding Argentine bases in general, Marambio Base has wireless internet and two mobile phone servers.

Orbcomm satellites which pass over Antarctica can relay short messages to and from transceiver units to email or XML over HTTP.

The McMurdo station has permanent access to a shared 17 Mbit/s connection; testing of the Starlink service began in September 2022, with a second terminal providing connectivity for the Allan Hills field camp brought in November 2022. As of January 2025, Starlink was working for the cruise ship Scenic Eclipse II, as far South as McMurdo station.

== Radio ==
=== Official broadcasts ===
- Argentina Bases: Radio Nacional Arcangel San Gabriel, Esperanza Base, on 15.476 MHz with 2 kW and 97.6 MHz. QSL cards verified.
- Chile Bases: Radio Soberania, Villa las Estrellas on 90.5 MHz with 100 W.
- United States Bases: American Forces Antarctic Network AFAN McMurdo, on 93.9 MHz with 30 W and 104.5 MHz with 50 W.
- Scott Base - New Zealand: Scott97FM, On 97.0 MHz with 25 W

=== Amateur radio ===
Several bases used their transceivers also to provide amateur radio worldwide communications on HF or amateur radio satellites with specific club callsigns, also useful on utility and emergency communications.

== List of research facilities and country codes ==
Base	Country calling code	Country	Note
Almirante Brown Antarctic Base	54	Argentina	
Amundsen–Scott South Pole Station	1	United States	
Artigas Base	598	Uruguay	
Asuka Station	81	Japan	
Base Presidente Eduardo Frei Montalva and Villa Las Estrellas	56	Chile	
Belgrano II	54	Argentina	
Bellingshausen Station	7	Russia	
Bernardo O'Higgins Station	56	Chile	
Byrd Station	1	United States	
Captain Arturo Prat Base	56	Chile	
Casey Station	672	Australia	can be direct dialed
Comandante Ferraz Brazilian Antarctic Base	55	Brazil	
Concordia Station	39; 33	Italy; France	
Davis Station	672	Australia	can be direct dialed
Dome Fuji Station	81	Japan	
Dumont d'Urville Station	33	France	
Esperanza Base	54	Argentina	
Gabriel de Castilla Spanish Antarctic Station	34	Spain	
Georg von Neumayer Station (Replaced by Neumayer Station)	49	Germany	
Gonzalez Videla Station	56	Chile	
Great Wall Station	86	China	
Halley Research Station	44	United Kingdom	
Henryk Arctowski Polish Antarctic Station	48	Poland	
Jang Bogo Station	82	South Korea	
Jinnah Antarctic Station	92	Pakistan	
Juan Carlos I Base	34	Spain	
Jubany	54	Argentina	
King Sejong Station	82	South Korea	
Kohnen-Station	49	Germany	
Kunlun Station	852	China	
Law-Racoviță-Negoiță Station	40	Romania	
Leningradskaya Station	7	Russia	
Machu Picchu Research Station	51	Peru	
Macquarie Island Station	672	Australia	can be direct dialed
Maitri Station	91	India	
Marambio Base	54	Argentina	
Mario Zucchelli Station	39	Italy	
Mawson Station	672	Australia	can be direct dialed
McMurdo Station	1	United States	can be reached by 64 code to Scott Base (NZ)
Mendel Polar Station	420	Czech Republic	
Mirny Station	7	Russia	
Mizuho Station	81	Japan	
Molodyozhnaya Station	7; 375	Russia; Belarus	
Neumayer Station	49	Germany	
Novolazarevskaya Station	7	Russia	
Orcadas Base	54	Argentina	
Palmer Station	1	United States	
Princess Elisabeth Base	32	Belgium	
Professor Julio Escudero Base	56	Chile	
Progress Station	7	Russia	
Rothera Research Station	44	United Kingdom	
Russkaya Station	7	Russia	
San Martín Base	54	Argentina	
SANAE IV (South African National Antarctic Expeditions)	27	South Africa	
Signy Research Station	44	United Kingdom	
St. Kliment Ohridski Base	359	Bulgaria	
Scott Base	64	New Zealand	can be reached via 64 2409 and four digits on McMurdo exchange
Showa Station	81	Japan	
Svea	46	Sweden	
Tor Station	47	Norway	
Troll Station	47	Norway	
Wasa Research Station	46	Sweden	
Vostok Station	7	Russia	
Vernadsky Research Base	380	Ukraine	
Zhongshan Station	86	China	
