= Troll Airfield =

Airstrip in Queen Maud Land, Antarctica

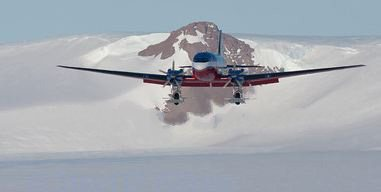
- Basler BT-67 at Troll airfield
- IATA: QAT; ICAO: ENOE

Summary
- Airport type: Private
- Owner: Norwegian Polar Institute
- Serves: Troll; Queen Maud Land; Antarctica
- Hub for: Dronning Maud Land Air Network
- Elevation AMSL: 1,220 m / 4,002 ft
- Coordinates: 71°57′19″S 2°28′03″E

Map
- Location in Antarctica

Runways
Direction	Length		Surface
Direction	m	ft	Surface
07/25	3,026	9,927	Blue Ice

Troll Airfield is an airstrip located 6.8 kilometres (4.2 mi) from the research station Troll in Princess Martha Coast in Queen Maud Land, Antarctica. Owned and operated by the Norwegian Polar Institute, it consists of a 3,300-by-100-metre (10,830 by 330 ft) runway on glacial blue ice on the Antarctic ice sheet. The airport is located at 1,232 metres (4,042 ft) above mean sea level and is 235 kilometres (146 mi) from the coast.

The airfield opened in 2005 and serves as the center of the Dronning Maud Land Air Network (DROMLAN), a multinational cooperation to use Troll as an all-year hub to provide intercontinental traffic to Antarctica and onwards to the various research stations using aircraft suitable for inter-Antarctic operations. Intercontinental flights normally operate from Cape Town International Airport using Ilyushin Il-76, C-130 Hercules, P-3 Orion, Boeing 767 and similar, long-range aircraft. Feeding services to other research station is normally done either with Basler BT-67 aircraft, De Havilland DHC-6/300 Twin Otter aircraft, and Dornier Do-228 aircraft and helicopters.

== Facilities ==
Troll Airfield is located 6.8 kilometres (4.2 mi) from Troll in Princess Martha Coast in Queen Maud Land, Antarctica. It is owned and operated by the Norwegian Polar Institute and consists of a 3,300-by-100-metre (10,830 by 330 ft) runway on glacial blue ice. This allows it to be used by any aircraft serving the Antarctic. There is no instrument landing system (ILS); instead visual flight rules (VFR) apply. There are no buildings or structures at the runway, although some services are provided from the research station. Ground handling, including supply of Jet A-1 fuel, is provided by the crew at Troll. The crew also supply services such as a fire and rescue service, communications and overnighting at Troll for personnel who would be stuck because of bad weather. The airfield must follow the Protocol on Environmental Protection to the Antarctic Treaty. This includes storing all fuel in barrels and large tanks placed on special mats which absorb liquids, to avoid spills. There is also equipment and plans to handle spills, should they occur. All waste is transported out of the Antarctic.

The airfield has a cold and dry climate, being located in a desert. The annual mean temperature is −25 °C (−13 °F), with the summer temperature able to reach about 0 °C (32 °F) and the lowest during the winter at −50 °C (−58 °F). Storms, which can occur throughout the year, can occasionally make outdoor activity impossible. Because it is located south of the Antarctic Circle, Troll has midnight sun in the summer and polar night during the winter.

== Service ==
Dronning Maud Land Air Network Project (DROMLAN) is a coordinated project between eleven countries with bases in Queen Maud Land (Norwegian: Dronning Maud Land) to create a coordinated logistics service to reduce costs. The participating countries are Belgium, Finland, Germany, India, Japan, the Netherlands, Norway, Russia, South Africa, Sweden and United Kingdom. The services are generally operated by aircraft chartered from commercial airlines, such as Airbus A319s, Boeing 737s, Boeing 767s, and smaller business jets. Russian Ilyushin Il-76s, Norwegian and Swedish C-130 Hercules and Norwegian P-3 Orion aircraft have also served the airfield The flights operate from Cape Town International Airport, with a flight time of up to nine hours for a Hercules aircraft, and five and a half hours for an Il-76.

Feeder services to other research stations are operated by two Basler BT-67 (type converted DC-3/C-47), operated by the South African company Antarctic Logistics Centre International or other operators. Services are operated to Aboa (Finnish), Dome F (Japanese), Halley (British), Kohnen (German), Maitri (Indian), Neumayer (German), Novolazarevskaya (Russian), Princess Elisabeth (Belgian), SANAE IV (South African), Showa (Japanese), Tor (Norwegian) and Wasa (Swedish). In the 2007–08 season, 720 people were transported to Antarctica via DROMLAN. The airport is not open for commercial or other private flights.

== History ==
During the planning of Troll, which opened in 1990, it was decided that the station was to be placed at such a location as to allow it to have an airstrip for year-round operations. Jutulsessen was chosen as the location, in part because it provided a base nunatak for the research station and at the same time was close to blue ice for the runway. At the time, all cargo and passengers to Troll had to either be transported by ship, or flown in via the airport at the Russian base Novolazarevskaya or Henriksenskjera.

In the late 1990s, the Norwegian Polar Institute took an initiative to establish DROMLAN in cooperation with eleven other countries who operate research facilities in Queen Maud Land. On 5 January 2001, a test flight with representatives from eight countries was made to Henriksenskjera. From there, a DHC-6/300 Twin Otter, a Basler BT-67, and a helicopter were used to distribute the crew and supplies to the various bases. In addition to evaluating the airfield at Novolazarevskaya, an evaluation was performed at Troll in January 2002. The hub model was used during the summer of 2001 and 2002, operated by the South African company Antarctic Logistics Centre International.

To build a permanent airfield at Troll, the Norwegian Polar Institute bought a snow groomer and a tracked vehicle with a snow blower, flatbed and ice cutter. The works was organized with a land-based Global Positioning System laser system. In the course of the 2002 season, 2,500 meters (8,200 ft) of runway had been built. This included removing of surface rocks and filling any crevasses. The construction also included necessary ground facilities, such as a fire and rescue service, communications, ground handling and overnight facilities at Troll for personnel who could be stranded because of bad weather. The construction involved the moving of 70,000 cubic metres (2,500,000 cu ft) of ice and snow.

Troll Airfield was opened on 11 February 2005 by Queen Sonja of Norway, and the new research station opened the following day. At first, Antonov An-2s, DHC-6/300 Twin Otters, Dornier 228s, and smaller aircraft were used for the services. Later, two Basler BT-67s, operated by Antarctic Logistics Centre International, were brought into use. The cooperation has resulted in the availability of larger aircraft more suited for research, through coordinated search and rescue operations between the participating countries. On January 19, 2008, the airfield was visited by Norwegian Prime Minister Jens Stoltenberg. On November 15, 2023, a Norse Atlantic Airways Boeing 787 registered LN-FNC landed at Troll Airfield after taking off from Oslo Gadermoen with a stop in Cape Town International Airport carrying 45 researchers from the Norwegian Polar Institute and 12 tons (24,000 pounds) of research equipment.

== Airlines and destinations ==
Airlines	Destinations
Icelandair	Charter: Cape Town
Norse Atlantic	Charter: Oslo via Cape Town
Smartwings	Charter: Oslo via Cape Town and N'Djamena

== See also ==
- List of airports in Antarctica

== Bibliography ==
- Kyvik, Helga, ed. (2008). Norge i Antarktis (in Norwegian). Oslo: Schibsted Forlag. ISBN 978-82-516-2589-0.
