= DROMLAN =

Logistics cooperation for Antarctica

Dronning Maud Land Air Network Project (DROMLAN) is a coordinated project between eleven countries with bases in Queen Maud Land, Antarctica (Norwegian: Dronning Maud Land) to create a coordinated logistics service to reduce costs. The participating countries are Belgium, Finland, Germany, India, Japan, the Netherlands, Norway, Russia, South Africa, Sweden and United Kingdom. The services are operated using Russian Ilyushin 76, Norwegian and Swedish C-130 Hercules and Norwegian P-3 Orion aircraft, also occasionally visited by other types of aircraft The flights operate from Cape Town International Airport to Troll Airfield, with a flight time of up to nine hours for a Hercules aircraft, and five and a half hours for an Il-76.

Feeder services to other research stations are operated by two Basler BT-67 (type converted DC-3/C-47), operated by the South African company Antarctic Logistics Centre International or other operators. Services are operated to Aboa (Finnish), Dome F (Japanese), Halley (British), Kohnen (German), Maitri (Indian), Neumayer (German), Novolazarevskaya (Russian), Princess Elisabeth (Belgian), SANAE IV (South African), Showa (Japanese), Tor (Norwegian) and Wasa (Swedish). In the 2007–08 season, 720 people were transported to Antarctica via DROMLAN. The airport is not open for commercial or other private flights.
