= Mizuho =

Mizuho (瑞穂) literally means "abundant rice" in Japanese and "harvest" in the figurative sense. It was also an ancient name of Japan. It might refer to:

== Places ==
- Mizuho, Gifu, a city in Gifu
- Mizuho, Tokyo, a town in Tokyo
- Mizuho Plateau in Antarctica
  - Mizuho Station (Antarctica)
- Mizuho Township, former name during the Japanese colonial period of the town of Ruisui, Hualien in Taiwan

== People ==
- Mizuho Aimoto (born 1964), Japanese female manga artist
- Mizuho Fukushima (born 1955), Japanese female politician
- Mizuho Habu (born 1997), Japanese model
- Mizuho Hasegawa (born 2010), Japanese skateboarder
- Mizuho Ishida (born 1988), Japanese former volleyball player
- Mizuho Kataoka (born 1994), Japanese rugby union player
- Mizuho Katayama (born 1969), female synchronized swimming coach in Japan who represented South Korea at the 1988 Olympics
- Mizuho Kusanagi (born 1979), Japanese female manga artist
- Mizuho Nasukawa (那須川 瑞穂; born 1979), Japanese long-distance runner
- Mizuho Ōta (1876–1955), Japanese poet
- Mizuho Sakaguchi (born 1987), Japanese female association footballer
- Mizuho Suzuki (born 1927), Japanese actor
- Mizuho Umemura (born 1978), Japanese politician
- Mizuho Yoshida (born 1965), Japanese actor
- Mizuho Saito, member of the former Japanese band Zone

== Fictional characters and places ==
- Mizuho Kazami, a character in the anime Please Teacher!
- Mizuho Miyanokouji, a character in the game and anime Otome wa Boku ni Koishiteru
- Mizuho, a fictional ninja village in the video game Tales of Symphonia
- Mizuho Asano, a side-character in the anime and manga Bleach

== Other ==
- Japanese seaplane carrier Mizuho
- Mizuho (train), a train service in Japan
- 2090 Mizuho, an asteroid
- Mizuho Financial Group, a Japanese banking conglomerate
