= National Institute of Polar Research =

Japanese research institute

Coordinates: 35°42′45″N 139°24′32″E

- 国立極地研究所
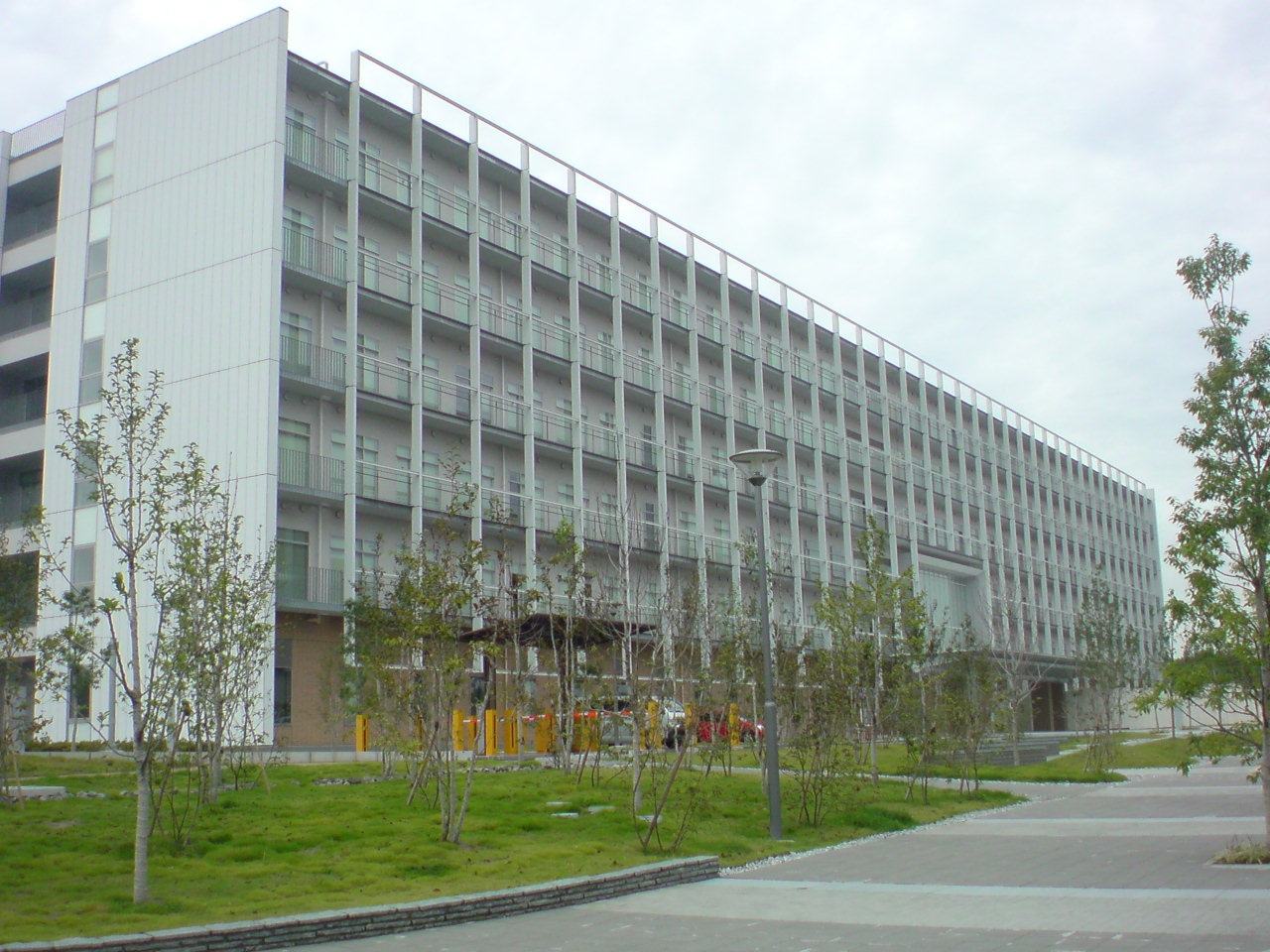
- Abbreviation: NIPR
- Formation: 1973; 53 years ago
- Website: www.nipr.ac.jp

National Institute of Polar Research, NIPR (Japanese: 国立極地研究所, Hepburn: Kokuritsu-kyokuchi-kenkyūsho) is the research institute responsible for scientific research and observation of the polar regions. NIPR manages several observation stations in the Arctic and Antarctica. It was founded in 1973.

== Research topics ==
The NIPR conducts Arctic observations of the atmosphere, ice sheets, Earth’s magnetic field and the ecosystems of the polar regions.

== Research stations ==
NIPR is an inter-university research institute that has observation stations in the Arctic and Antarctica. Stations are located in Svalbard, Greenland, northern Scandinavia, Queen Maud Land, and Iceland.

- Asuka Station
- Dome F
- Mizuho Station
- Showa Station

== Asteroid ==
Asteroid 7773 Kyokuchiken was named in honor of The National Institute of Polar Research (by its shortened Japanese name "Kyokuchiken"). The official naming citation was published by the Minor Planet Center on 25 September 2018 (M.P.C. 111797).

== See also ==
- Polar Science
- Glossary of meteoritics
