= Polar Science =

Scientific journal of polar region research

- Discipline: Polar regions of Earth
- Language: English
- Edited by: Takashi Yamanouchi

Publication details
- History: 2007-present
- Publisher: Elsevier on behalf of the National Institute of Polar Research
- Frequency: Quarterly
- Open access: Hybrid
- Impact factor: 1.927 (2020)

Standard abbreviations
- ISO 4: Polar Sci.

Indexing
- ISSN: 1873-9652
- LCCN: 2008206457
- OCLC no.: 655039871

Links
- Journal homepage; Online archive

Polar Science is a quarterly peer-reviewed scientific journal covering research related to the polar regions of the Earth and other planets. It is published by Elsevier on behalf of the National Institute of Polar Research (Japan). It covers a wide range of fields, including atmospheric science, oceanography, glaciology and environmental science. The editor-in-chief is Takashi Yamanouchi (National Institute of Polar Research and Sōkendai).

The journal is hybrid open access. By paying a fee, authors can choose to make their papers open access at the time of publication. All papers that are over 24 months old are freely available to the community via ScienceDirect.

== Abstracting and indexing ==
The journal is abstracted and indexed in the Science Citation Index Expanded, Scopus, EBSCOhost, GEOBASE, GeoRef, ProQuest and Referativnyi Zhurnal (VINITI Database RAS). According to the Journal Citation Reports, the journal has a 2020 impact factor of 1.927.
