= Mizuho Plateau =

Coordinates: 71°30′S 39°0′E

The Mizuho Plateau (みずほ高原, Mizuho Kōgen) is a mainly featureless ice plateau in Antarctica, situated eastward of the Queen Fabiola Mountains and southward of the Shirase Glacier in Queen Maud Land. A field party of the Japanese Antarctic Research Expedition studied the plateau in November and December 1960 and named it. At the Japanese Showa Station on East Ongul Island, it was called "Japan Highland", but this name was not adopted officially. "Mizuho" is one of the ancient names of Japan.
