= Dome F =

Antarctic base in Queen Maud Land

Dome Fuji Station ドームふじ基地, Dōmu Fuji Kichi Dome Fuji Observation Base (until 2004)
- Antarctic research station
- Location in Antarctica
- Coordinates: 77°19′01″S 39°42′07″E
- Region: Queen Maud Land
- Established: January 1995
- Closed: 2019
- Named after: Mount Fuji

Government
  - Type: Administration
  - Body: NIPR, Japan
- Elevation: 3,700 m (12,100 ft)
- UN/LOCODE: AQ DMF
- Active times: Some summers
- Website: nipr.ac.jp

Dome Fuji Skiway
- IATA: none; ICAO: none

Summary
- Airport type: Private
- Location: Queen Maud Land
- Elevation AMSL: 12,354 ft (3,765 m)
- Coordinates: 77°19′00″S 39°42′00″E

Map
- Location of airfield in Antarctica

Runways
Direction	Length		Surface
Direction	ft	m	Surface
	3,937	1,200	Ice

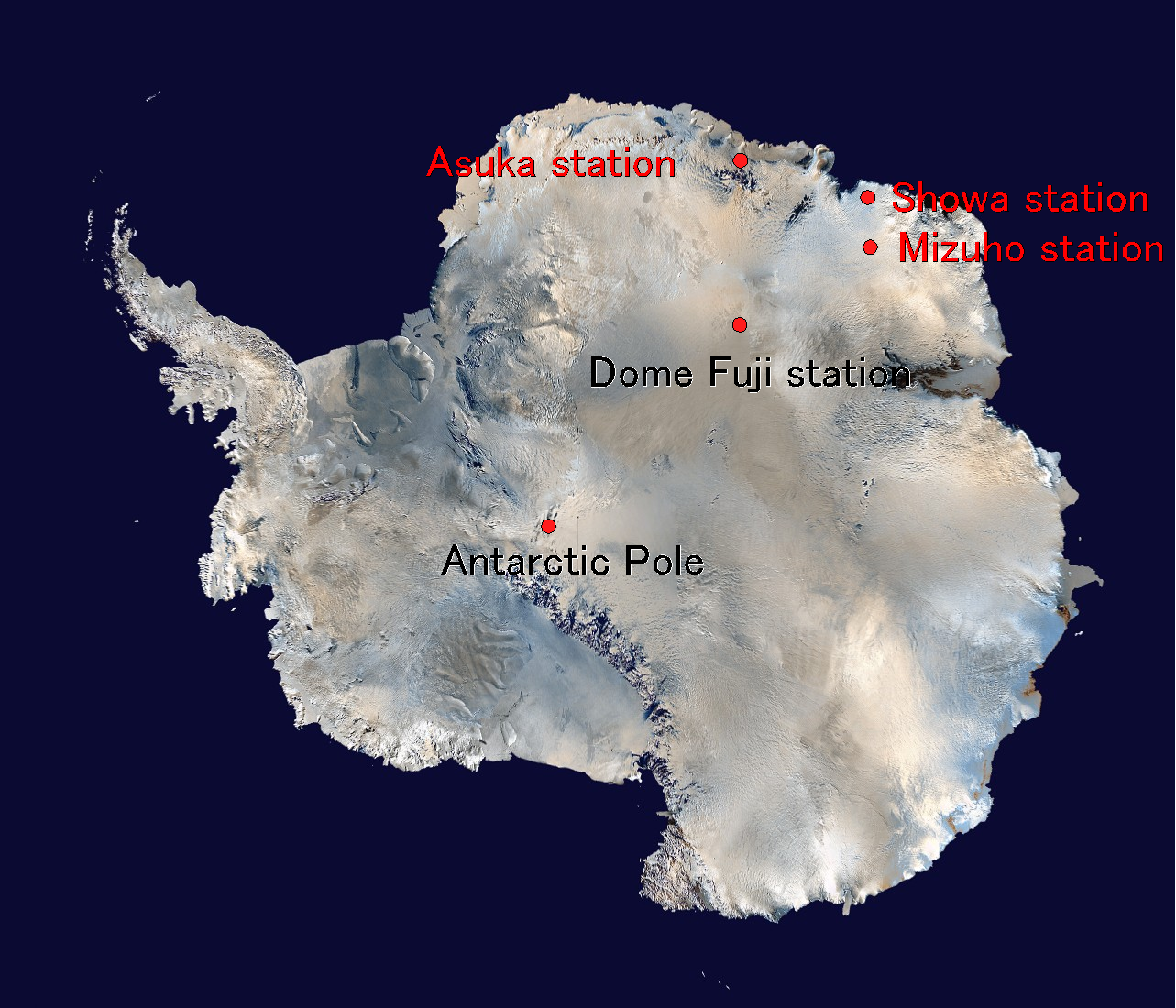
Japanese stations in Antarctica

Dome Fuji (ドームふじ Dōmu Fuji), also called Dome F or Valkyrie Dome, is an Antarctic base located in the eastern part of Queen Maud Land. With an altitude of 3,810 metres (12,500 ft) above sea level, it is the second-highest summit or ice dome of the East Antarctic Ice Sheet and represents an ice divide. Dome F is the site of Dome Fuji Station, a research station operated by Japan.

== Discovery and naming ==
Dome Fuji is an ice dome rising to about 3,700 metres (12,100 ft) in the eastern part of Queen Maud Land. It is the highest elevation in Queen Maud Land and also the highest elevation within the claims of Norway. In 1963–1964, a land based Soviet Antarctic Expedition team travelled across the northern part of the dome at an elevation of over 3,600 metres (11,800 ft).

== Environment ==
Owing to its location on the Antarctic Plateau and the high elevation, Dome Fuji is one of the coldest places on Earth. Temperatures rarely rise above −30 °C (−20 °F) in summer and can drop to −80 °C (−110 °F) in winter. The annual average air temperature is −54.3 °C (−65.7 °F). The climate is that of a cold desert, with very dry conditions and an annual precipitation of about 25 millimetres (1 in) of water equivalent, which falls entirely as ice crystals.

== Dome Fuji Station ==
Dome Fuji Station (ドームふじ基地 Dōmu Fuji Kichi) was established as Dome Fuji Observation Base (ドームふじ観測拠点 Dōmu Fuji Kansoku Kyoten) in January 1995. Its name was changed to "Dome Fuji Station" on April 1, 2004. Located at 77°19′S 39°42′E, it is separated from Showa Station by about 1,000 kilometres (620 mi).

== Glaciology ==
Deep ice core drilling at Valkyrie Dome was started in August 1995, and in December 1996 a depth of 2,503 metres (8,212 ft) was reached. This first core covers a period back to 340,000 years.

The core quality from the Dome Fuji Station is excellent, even in the brittle zone from 500 to 860 metres (1,640 to 2,820 ft) deep, where the ice is fragile during the in situ core-cutting procedure.

A second deep core was started in 2003. Drilling was carried out during four subsequent austral summers from 2003–2004 until 2006–2007, and by then a depth of 3,035.22 metres (9,958.1 ft) was reached. The drill did not hit the bedrock, but rock particles and refrozen water have been found in the deepest ice, indicating that the bedrock is very close to the bottom of the borehole. This core greatly extends the climatic record of the first core, and according to a first, preliminary dating, it reaches back 720,000 years. The ice of the second Valkyrie Dome core is therefore the second-oldest ice ever recovered, outranged only by the EPICA Dome C core.

== See also ==
- List of Antarctic research stations
- List of Antarctic field camps
- Airports in Antarctica
- Troll (research station)
- Asuka Station (Antarctica)
- Mizuho Station (Antarctica)
- Showa Station (Antarctica)
- Vostok Station
- Climate of Antarctica
