= .aq =

Top-level Internet domain for Antarctica

- Introduced: February 26, 1992
- TLD type: Country code top-level domain
- Status: Active
- Registry: Antarctica Network Information Centre Limited; Swizzle Limited
- Sponsor: Mott and Associates
- Intended use: Entities connected with Antarctica
- Actual use: Used by several scientific stations and projects in Antarctica; also sees some use over .hm for government sites related to the Territory of Heard Island and McDonald Islands
- Registration restrictions: Must have physical presence in Antarctica or be a governmental organization signatory to the Antarctic Treaty
- Structure: Registrations are taken at second level
- Documents: Registration form
- Dispute policies: None
- DNSSEC: No
- Registry website: None

.aq is the Internet country code top-level domain (ccTLD) for Antarctica (itself not a country). It is derived from the French Antarctique and is reserved for organizations that work in Antarctica or promote the Antarctic and Southern Ocean regions. It is administered by Peter Mott of Antarctica Network Information Centre Limited from Christchurch, New Zealand.

.aq domain names are available free of charge, and registration is granted for a period of 24 months. However, registrants must have a "physical presence" in Antarctica which, aside from working on the continent, can include:

- Unattended installations owned or operated by the registrant, or
- Short term visits to the ice by the registrant or its employees, in which a letter signed by the officer in charge of the base or expedition is required.

As a general rule, registrants are only allocated a single .aq domain name. The registry does not have a website. Registration is only possible by contacting Antarctica Network Information Centre Limited.

== See also ==
- Telecommunications in Antarctica
