= Troll (research station) =

Troll Station
- Antarctic base
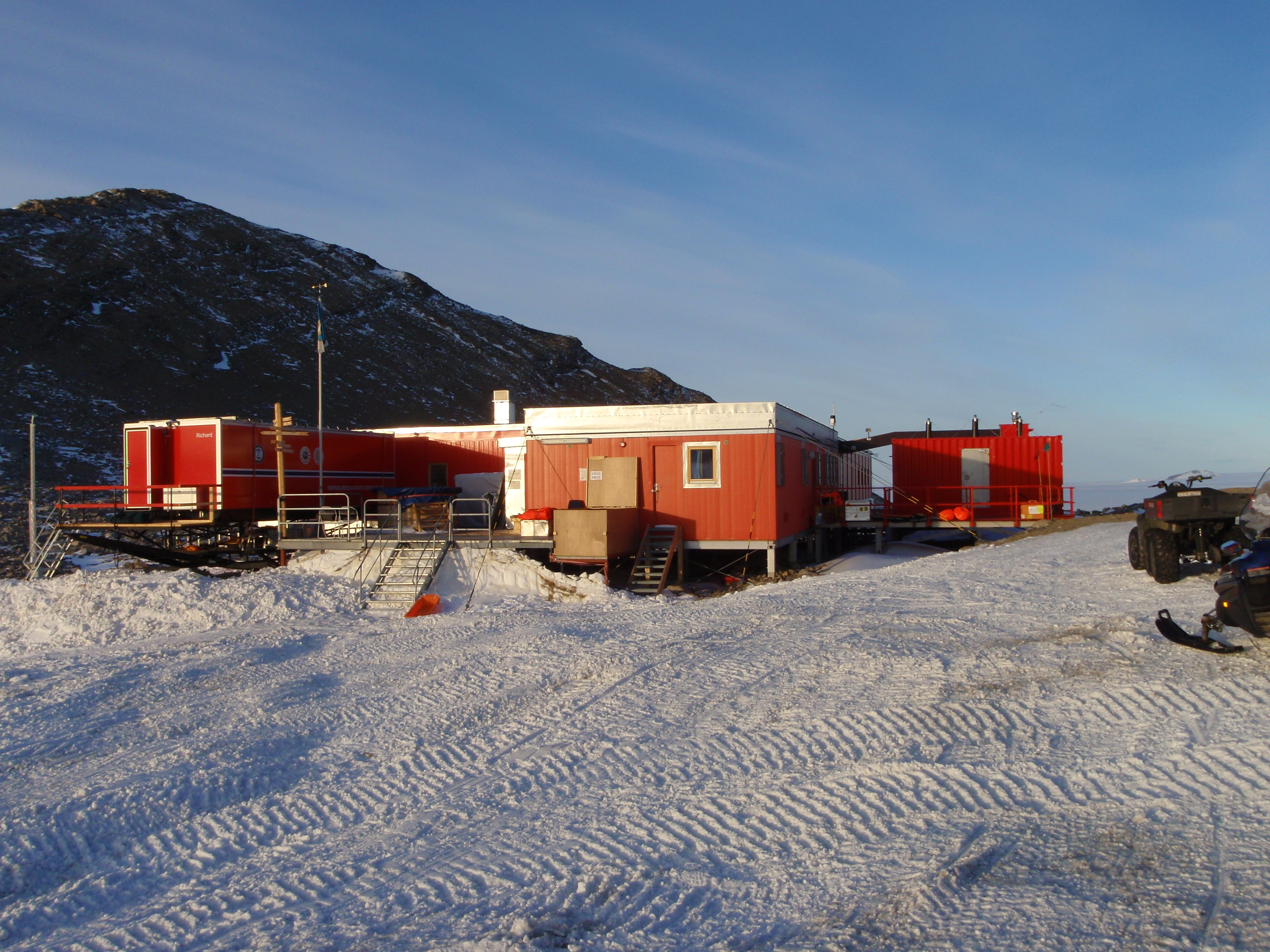
- Troll Station

- Location of Troll Station in Antarctica
- Coordinates: 72°00′42″S 2°32′06″E
- Country: Norway
- Location in Antarctica: Jutulsessen; Queen Maud Land; Antarctica
- Administered by: Norwegian Polar Institute
- Established: 1990
- Elevation: 1,275 m (4,183 ft)

Population (2017)
  - Summer: 45
  - Winter: 7
- Time zone: UTC+2 (CEST (March–Oct))
  - Summer (DST): UTC+0 (GMT (Oct–March))
- UN/LOCODE: AQ TRL
- Type: All-year round
- Period: Annual
- Status: Operational
- Activities: List: Organic and inorganic pollution; Ozone depletion
- Website: Troll Station; Norwegian Polar Institute

Troll
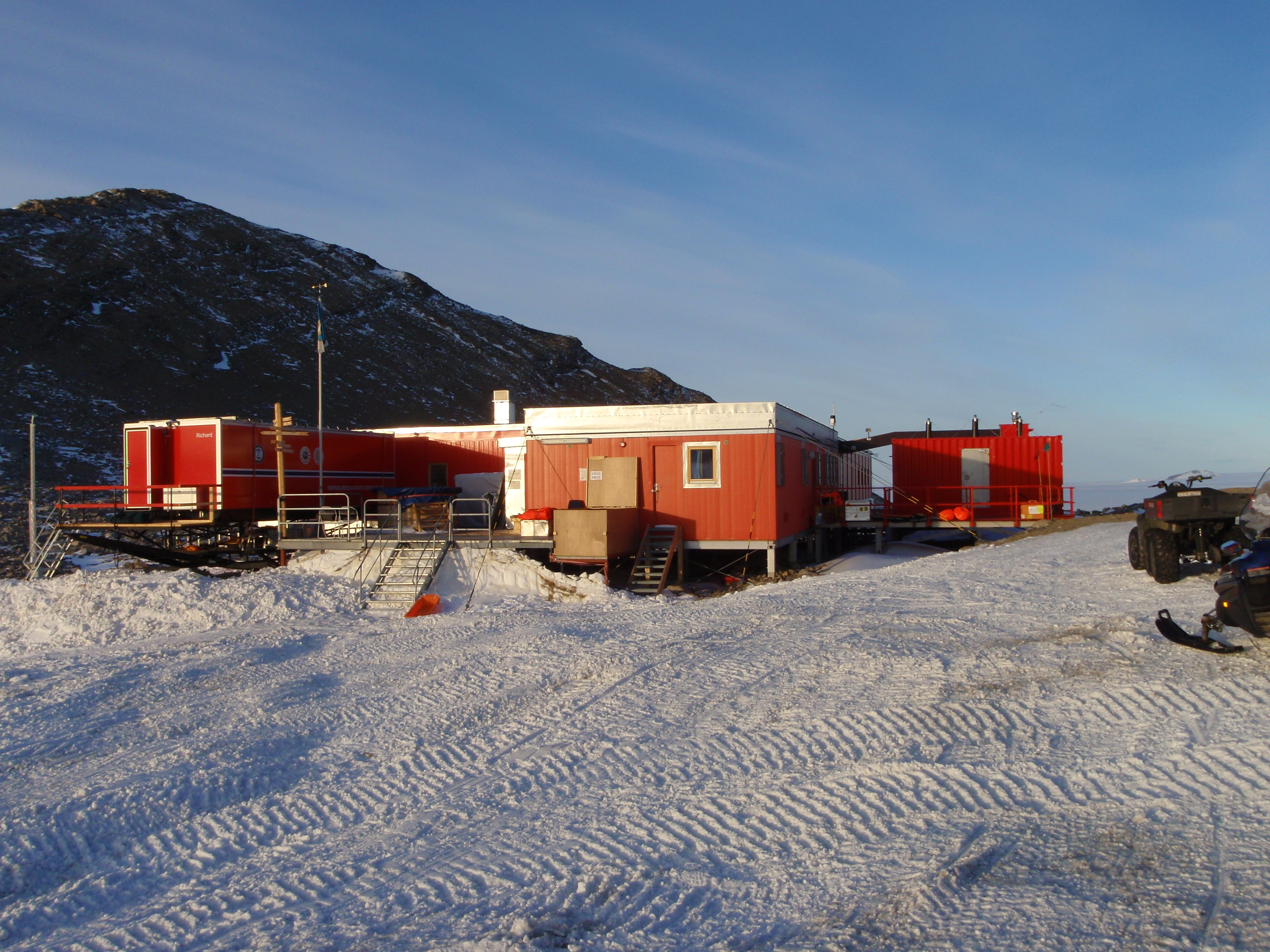

- Location within Antarctica

General information
- Type: Modular
- Location: Jutulsessen; Queen Maud Land; Antarctica
- Coordinates: 72°00′41″S 2°32′06″E
- Elevation: 1,270 metres (4,170 ft)
- Current tenants: Norwegian Polar Institute
- Inaugurated: 17 February 1990; 11 February 2005

Technical details
- Floor area: 400 m^{2} (4,300 sq ft)

Design and construction
- Main contractor: AF Gruppen

Troll is a Norwegian research station located at Jutulsessen, 235 kilometres (146 mi) from the coast in the eastern part of Princess Martha Coast in Queen Maud Land, Antarctica. It is Norway's only year-round research station in Antarctica, and is supplemented by the summer-only station Tor 91.7 km (57 mi) to the east. Troll is operated by the Norwegian Polar Institute and also features facilities for the Norwegian Meteorological Institute and the Norwegian Institute for Air Research.

Unlike most other research stations on the continent, Troll is constructed on the snow-free slope of solid rock breaking through the ice sheet at Jutulsessen, located 1,275 metres (4,183 ft) above mean sea level. The station opened as a summer-only station in 1990 and was designated as a year-round station in 2005. It has an overwintering capacity of six people and a summer capacity of 70. It is served by Troll Airfield, which is the base for the Dronning Maud Land Air Network (DROMLAN).

== Facilities ==
Troll is located in the eastern part of Princess Martha Coast in Queen Maud Land, which Norway claims as a dependent territory. The station is located on the nunatak bare ground area Jutulsessen, at 1,270 metres (4,170 ft) above mean sea level. It is completely surrounded by the Antarctic ice sheet. This is unlike most other Antarctic research stations, which are located on snow. Troll is 235 kilometres (146 mi) from the coast.

The station facilities are owned by the Government of Norway through the Norwegian Directorate of Public Construction and Property. Operation of the facility is done by another government agency, the Norwegian Polar Institute. The facilities consist of a module-built new section that is 300 square meters (3,200 sq ft), and the old section that is 100 square meters (1,100 sq ft). The new section consists of eight bedrooms, a gym, a sauna, a kitchen, a communication center and office space. In addition, there are several smaller buildings which are used as laboratories, provision stores, generators and garages. The old station is used partially for storage and partially as a summer station. The facility also features an emergency facility for eight people, located at a safe distance from the main base, in case of fire or other accidents. The station is dimensioned to tolerate temperatures down to −60 °C (−76 °F) and wind speeds of 60 metres per second (200 ft/s).

The facility attempts to minimize its environmental impact through several mechanisms, including minimizing area usage. Energy consumption is reduced by using recirculating excess heat to melt snow and ice for drinking water and heating. Waste is minimized through purchase planning and recycling; the remaining waste is compressed and transported away from the Antarctic. Fuel is handled in such a way that even small spills are minimized. In 2016 a solar PV plant with 7.3 kilowatt peak has been installed on one of the roof tops. It serves as a pilot installation for the declared middle term target of reducing the oil consumption of the research station significantly, by extending the solar PV plant over the next few years.

The station has a cold and dry climate, being located in a desert. The annual mean temperature is −25 °C (−13 °F), with the summer temperature able to reach about 0 °C (32 °F) and the lowest during the winter at −50 °C (−58 °F). Storms, which can occur throughout the year, can occasionally make outdoor activity impossible. Being located south of the Antarctic Circle, Troll has midnight sun in the summer (from about November 9 to February 1) and polar night during the winter (from about May 15 to July 27).

== Research ==
The Norwegian Institute for Air Research (NILU) maintains air and atmospheric measurement equipment at Troll. Combined with a similar measuring station, Zeppelin in Ny-Ålesund, Svalbard, Norway. This allows the institute to collect such data from both polar regions. In particular, the facility measures aerosols, organic and inorganic pollution, ozone and ultraviolet (UV) radiation. NILU also creates air samples annually to generate data for trend analysis. The weekly air pollution measurements are compared to equivalent measurements at Zeppelin. Ground measurements are taken of ozone and mercury, two of the greatest pollution threats in the polar regions. Stratosphere measurements are conducted to measure ozone and UV levels, in particular to gain additional information about ozone depletion and the Antarctic ozone hole.

The Norwegian Meteorological Institute operates a staffed weather station at Troll. It measures air pressure, temperature, humidity and wind, both at the station itself and at the airfield.

=== Troll Satellite Station ===
Kongsberg Satellite Services, a joint venture between Kongsberg Group and the Norwegian Space Center, operates TrollSat, a satellite ground station which allows downloading of data. In conjunction with SvalSat, located in Longyearbyen, Svalbard, TrollSat targets satellites in a polar orbit. TrollSat consists of a single radome with an 7.3-metre (24 ft) low Earth orbit antenna capable of S band and X band reception. To relay the information, TrollSat has a 4.8-metre (16 ft) and a 7.6-metre (25 ft) C band uplink to provide broadband connection to Europe and North America. TrollSat will be one of 30 ground stations for the European satellite navigation system Galileo, and is Norway's main contribution to the project.

== History ==
During the 1980s, it became increasingly important for the Government of Norway to have a permanent base in Queen Maud Land. The area had been annexed as a dependency on 14 January 1939, at the time mainly based on Norwegian whaling interests in the Antarctic. From 1956, Norway operated the research station Norway Station, but this was given to South Africa in 1959. From the 1960s through the 1980s, Norway's research activities in Antarctica were sporadic and without a fixed base. This gave the advantage that the research was not bound geographically, but it weakened the Norwegian claim for Queen Maud Land and the right to participate as a consultative member of the Antarctic Treaty. In 1989, any party to the Treaty could ask for it to be renegotiated, and Norwegian authorities saw the need for a permanent base to strengthen Norway's claim to Queen Maud Land.

The Norwegian Polar Institute decided to establish a summer station. This was built during the summer of 1989 and 1990, resulting in a 100-square-metre (1,100 sq ft) building with room for eight people. Construction required 300 tonnes (300 long tons; 330 short tons) of materials to be hauled from the coast and the station was officially opened on 17 February 1990. The station took its name from the surrounding jagged mountains, which resemble trolls of Norse mythology. The first overwintering occurred in 2000, when a South Pole expedition used the camp as a base.

To ease logistics, Norway took the initiative to establish Dronning Maud Land Air Network (DROMLAN), a cooperation between the countries with bases in Queen Maud Land to streamline transport costs. Having an airfield at Troll allows quicker transport to the research stations in western Queen Maud Land, which are located further away from the incumbent airfields at Henriksenskjera and Novolazarevskaya. The first flight that was a preliminary to DROMLAN was made in 2000 from Cape Town, South Africa, to Henriksenskjera, where a Twin Otter was used onwards to Troll.

In 2003, it was decided that Norway was to extend its operations in Antarctica by establishing a year-round research station. By then, Norway was the only country with a territorial claim to Antarctica to not have a year-round research station on the continent. The government stated that the investment was motivated to improve climate research, to strengthen Norway as a bi-polar research nation and to strengthen Norway's role as a premise-maker in the environmental policy of the Antarctic.

Construction of the expansion was done from December 2004 through February 2005 by the Norwegian Directorate of Public Construction and Property, who contracted the job to AF Gruppen. About 700 tonnes (690 long tons; 770 short tons) of equipment was hauled to the base from the ice shelf. The base was prefabricated and only required the modules to be connected at site. New infrastructure included a new generator, emergency station, garage, provision stores, container ramps for equipment and fuel, and more laboratories. At the same time, the Norwegian Meteorological Institute established a meteorological station at Troll.

The construction of the runway itself required the filling of crevasses and the removal of stones. Troll Airfield was opened on 11 February 2005 by Queen Sonja of Norway and the new research station the following day. After the opening, another power station was built in 2005. In 2006, a satellite base station was built by Kongsberg Satellite Services. This resulted in the need for a broadband connection for the base. During the winter season of 2006, there was no overwintering due to lack of funding, but from 2007 this has been reinstated. In 2008, a windmill was put into service to provide some of the power.

Norwegian Prime Minister Jens Stoltenberg visited Troll in January 2008, when he among other things opened TrollSat. At the same time, as part of the International Polar Year, a joint Norwegian – United States expedition traveled from Troll to the Amundsen–Scott South Pole Station and back. On 23 February 2009, Norwegian Minister of the Environment Erik Solheim hosted a meeting for environment ministers from 15 countries to discuss climate change and learn about recent research in the field.

== See also ==
- List of Antarctic research stations
- List of Antarctic field camps

== Bibliography ==
- Kyvik, Helga, ed. (2008). Norge i Antarktis (in Norwegian). Oslo: Schibsted Forlag. ISBN 978-82-516-2589-0.
