= Nordenskiöld Base =

Coordinates: 73°03′S 13°20′W

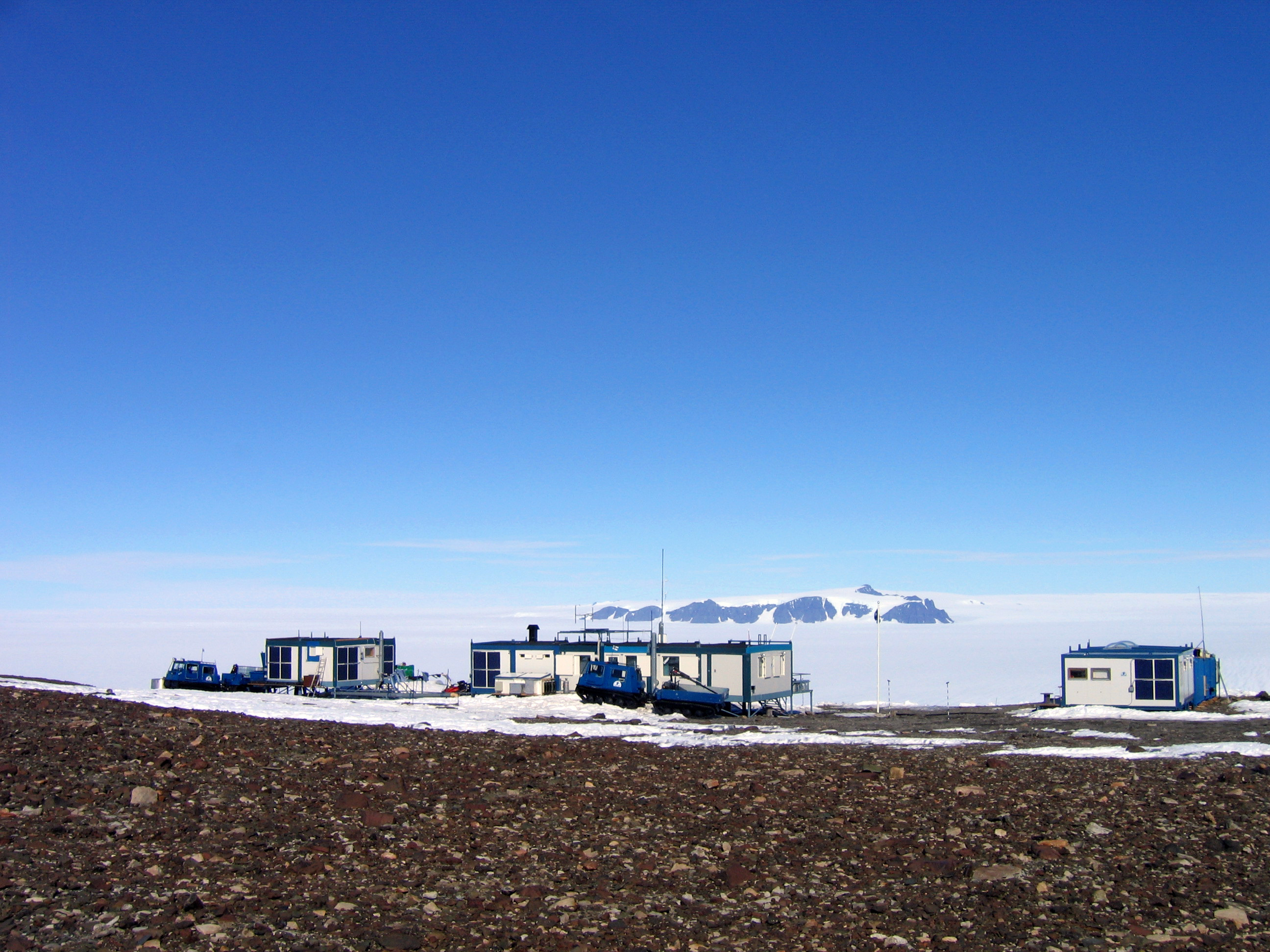
The Aboa Research Station

The Nordenskiöld Base is a name used for the facilities shared by the Antarctic stations Wasa (Sweden) and Aboa (Finland). The name honors Otto Nordenskjöld, a Finnish-Swedish polar explorer who led the first Swedish Antarctic Expedition.
