= Asuka Station (Antarctica) =

Asuka Station あすか基地 Asuka Observation Base (until 2004)
- Antarctic research station
- Location in Antarctica
- Coordinates: 71°31′18″S 24°08′12″E
- Region: Queen Maud Land
- Location: Near Mount Romnaes
- Established: 26 March 1985
- Closed: January 1992
- Named after: Asuka, Yamato

Government
  - Type: Administration
  - Body: NIPR, Japan
- Active times: Every summer
- Website: nipr.ac.jp

The Asuka Station (Japanese: あすか基地, Hepburn: Asuka Kichi) was a permanent Japanese Antarctic unmanned observation base. It is located on Queen Maud Land and was opened in 1985. The station closed in January 1992 and is listed as temporarily closed as of 2015. It is currently under snow.

== See also ==
- List of Antarctic research stations
- List of Antarctic field camps
