= Mizuho Station (Antarctica) =

Mizuho Station みずほ基地
- Antarctic research station
- Location in Antarctica
- Coordinates: 70°41′57″S 44°16′45″E
- Region: Queen Maud Land
- Location: Mizuho Plateau
- Established: 21 July 1970
- Closed: 12 October 1986
- Named after: Mizuho Plateau

Government
  - Type: Administration
  - Body: NIPR, Japan
- Elevation: 2,230 m (7,320 ft)
- Active times: Every summer
- Website: nipr.ac.jp

The Mizuho Station (Japanese: みずほ基地, Hepburn: Mizuho Kichi) was a permanent Japanese Antarctic transshipment station. Located on Mizuho Plateau 2230 m above sea level, it was opened in 1970. It was operated by the Japanese National Institute of Polar Research, and closed in 1987. It was occasionally visited by some parties for meteorological and glaciological observations.

== See also ==
- List of Antarctic research stations
- List of Antarctic field camps
