= Aboa (research station) =

Finnish research station in Antarctica

Aboa Station
- Antarctic base
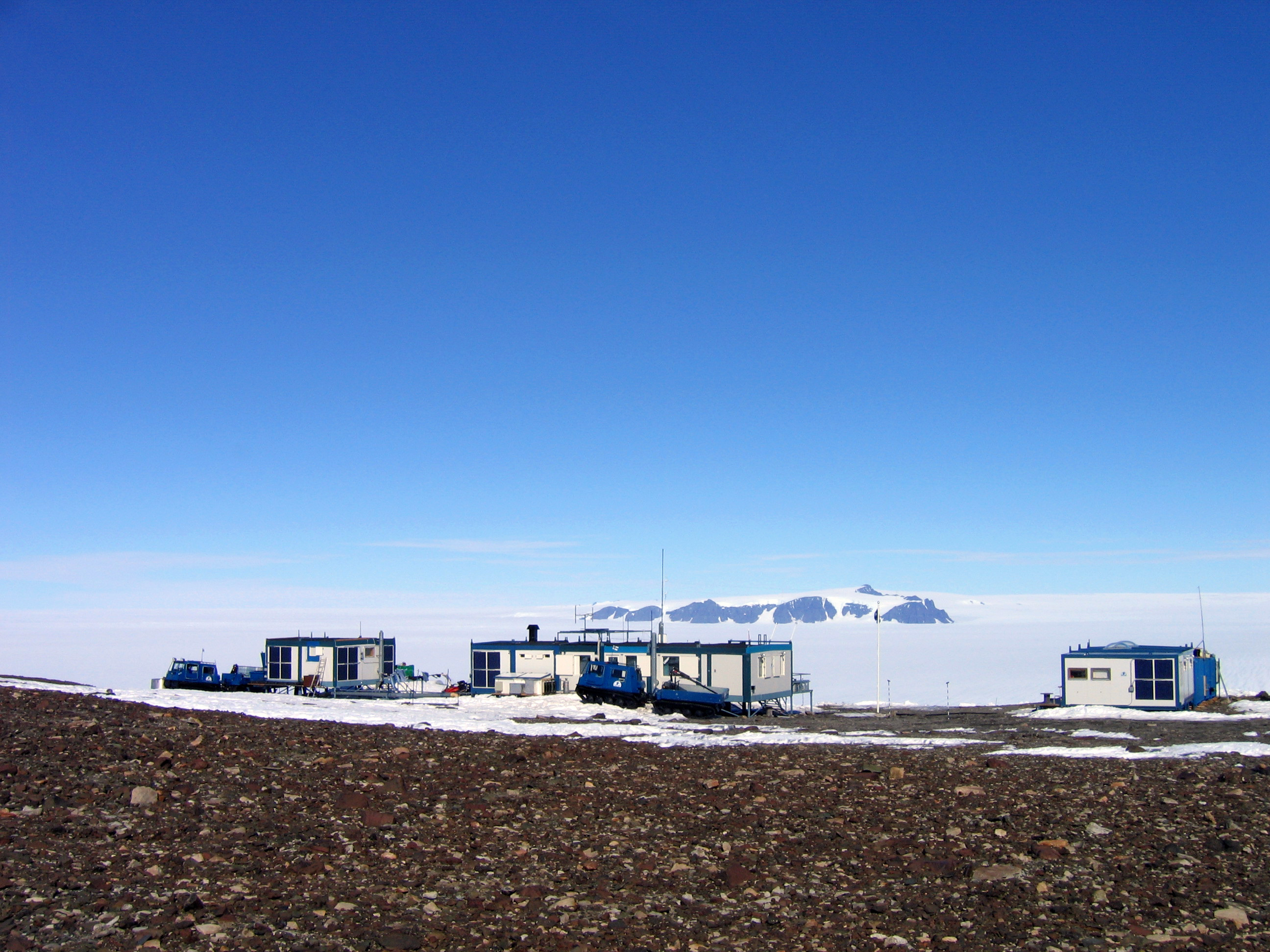
- Aboa Station
- Etymology: Latin name of Turku
- Location of Aboa Station in Antarctica
- Coordinates: 73°02′32″S 13°24′26″W
- Country: Finland
- Location in Antarctica: Princess Martha Coast; Queen Maud Land
- Administered by: Finnish Antarctic Research Program
- Established: 1988
- Elevation: 400 m (1,300 ft)

Population (2017)
  - Summer: 13
  - Winter: 0
- UN/LOCODE: AQ ABA
- Type: Seasonal
- Period: Summer
- Status: Operational
- Activities: List: Geodesy; Glaciology; Marine biology; Oceanography

Aboa (from the Latin name of Turku) is a seasonal Finnish research station in Antarctica, located in Queen Maud Land, about 130 kilometres (81 mi) from the coast, on a nunatak called Basen in the Kraul Mountains.

== Facilities and purpose ==
Opened in 1988, the station was designed and built by VTT Technical Research Centre of Finland, and funded by the Finnish Ministry of Trade and Industry (now part of the Finnish Ministry of Employment and the Economy).

The station is used in the Antarctic summer only. Currently the station has living and work space for expeditions of 15 people, and allows temporary living space for up to 17 people.

The Swedish station Wasa is located only 200 metres (660 ft) away. Together, Aboa and Wasa form the Nordenskiöld Base and the two stations work in close cooperation.

== See also ==
- List of Antarctic research stations
- List of Antarctic field camps
