= Wasa Research Station =

Swedish Antarctic research station

Wasa Station
- Antarctic base
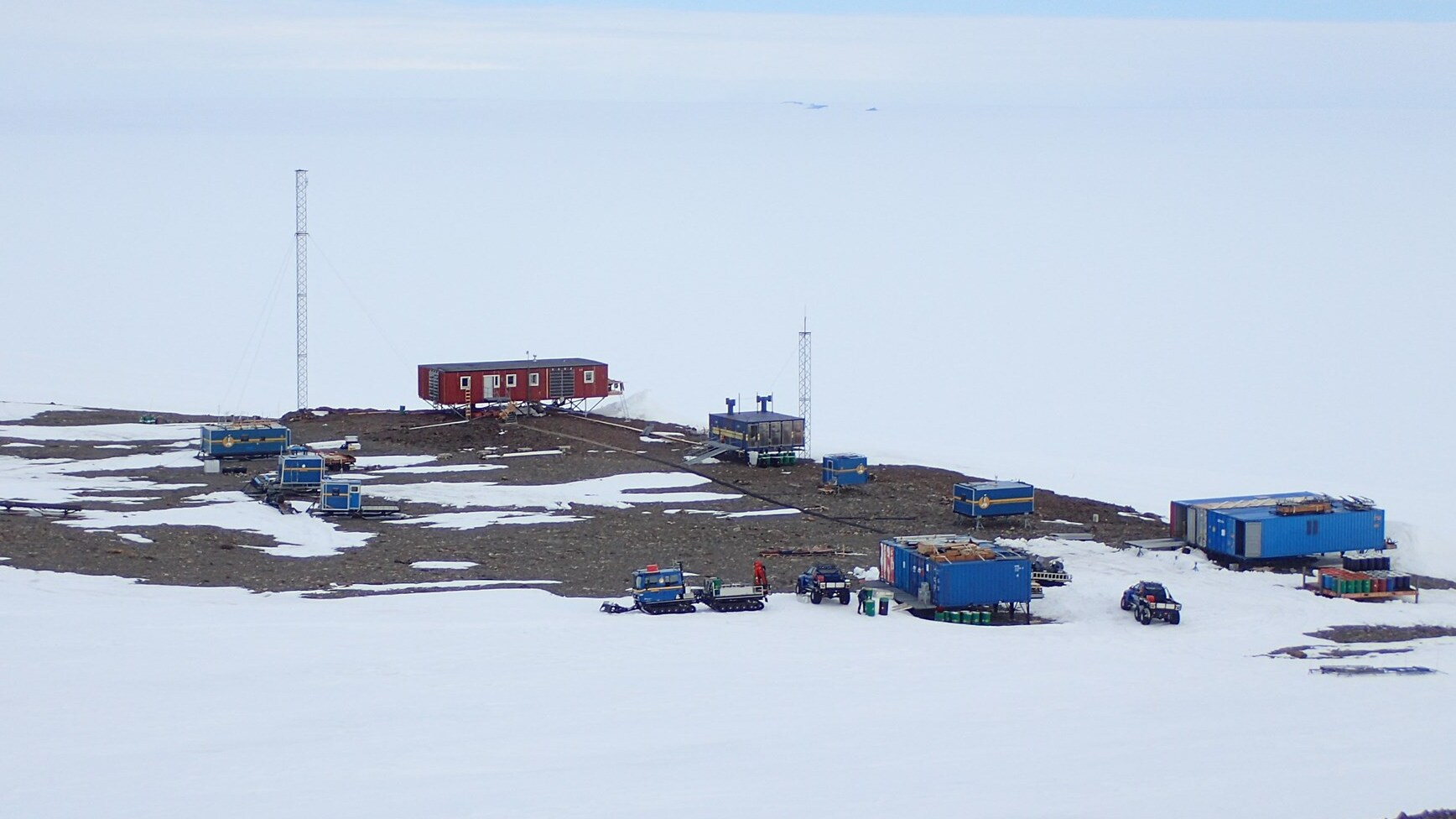
- Wasa Research Station in 2017

- Location of Wasa Research Station in Antarctica
- Coordinates: 73°02′24″S 13°23′55″W
- Country: Sweden
- Location in Antarctica: Princess Martha Coast; Queen Maud Land; Antarctica
- Administered by: Swedish Polar Research Secretariat
- Established: 1988
- Elevation: 440 m (1,440 ft)

Population (2017)
  - Summer: 13
  - Winter: 0
- UN/LOCODE: AQ WSA
- Type: Seasonal
- Period: Summer
- Status: Operational
- Activities: Variable according to the expedition
- Website: Swedish Polar Research Secretariat

The Wasa Research Station is a Swedish research facility in Antarctica, established in 1988/1989. It is situated next to the Finnish Aboa Research Station on the Basen nunatak in the Kraul Mountains in Queen Maud Land. The two stations cooperate, and are jointly referred to as the Nordenskiöld Base Camp.

== Purpose and facilities ==
The Wasa Station is operated by the Swedish Polar Research Secretariat during the summer season, and accommodates up to 20 people. Its main building is 17.5 by 7.6 metres (57 ft × 25 ft), and constructed on top of 1.5-metre (4 ft 11 in) long supporting cylinders to avoid accumulation of snow. It features four bedrooms, a big kitchen and a living room. There is also a shower, a sauna and a laundry room. The station was designed to be extremely energy efficient, with energy supplied mainly by solar and wind power.

The Swedish Polar Research Secretariat has developed a system of tracked vehicles, sledges and housing modules for transportation to the scientists’ workplaces. Snowmobiles are used for shorter, less laborious fieldwork. Wasa and the other research stations in Dronning Maud Land are reached through the aviation partnership within DROMLaN, the Dronning Maud Land Air Network.

== See also ==
- List of Antarctic research stations
- List of Antarctic field camps
