= Syowa Station (Antarctica) =

Syowa 昭和基地
- Antarctic base
- Shōwa Kichi
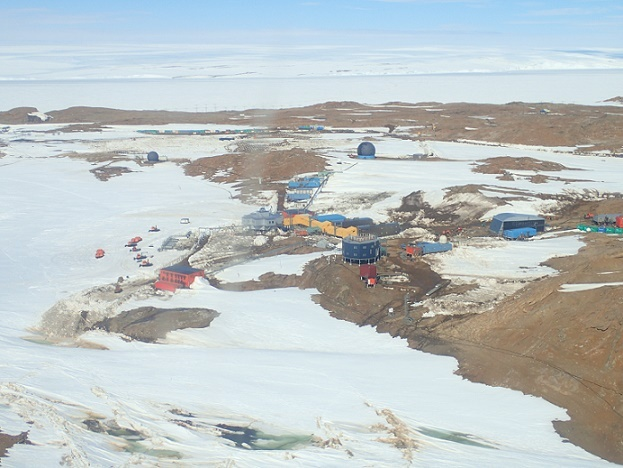
- An aerial photograph of Syowa Station, December 2018.

- Location of Syowa Station in Antarctica
- Coordinates: 69°00′15″S 39°34′55″E
- Country: Japan
- Location in Antarctica: East Ongul Island; Queen Maud Land; Antarctica
- Administered by: Japanese Antarctic Program
- Established: 1957
- Elevation: 29 m (95 ft)

Population (2017)
  - Summer: 170
  - Winter: 40
- Time zone: UTC+3 (SYOT)
- UN/LOCODE: AQ SYW
- Type: All-year round
- Period: Annual
- Status: Operational
- Activities: PANSY incoherent scatter radar
- Facilities: 60 separate buildings
- Website: National Institute of Polar Research

Syowa Station (Japanese: 昭和基地, Hepburn: Shōwa Kichi) is a Japanese permanent research station on East Ongul Island in Queen Maud Land, Antarctica. Built in 1957, Syowa Station is named for the era in the Japanese calendar during which it was established, the Shōwa period. (Note: The official spelling seen on the NIPR English website and on-site signage uses Nihon-shiki romanization, though the facility is also referred to in English language journals and news sources as Showa Station.)

== Overview ==
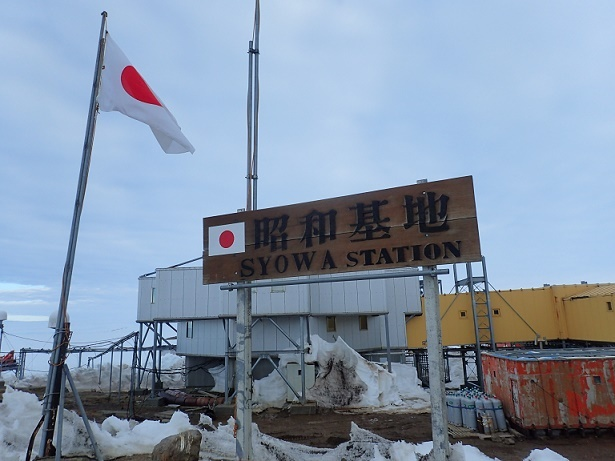
Sign in front of the main administration building, 2018

Syowa Station serves as a research outpost for astronomy, meteorology, biology and earth sciences. It comprises over 60 separate buildings, large and small, including a 3-storey administration building, living quarters, power plant, sewage treatment facility, environmental science building, observatory, data processing facility, satellite building, ionospheric station, incinerator, earth science building, and radiosonde station. Also present are fuel tanks, water storage, solar panels, a heliport, water retention dam, and radio transmitter.

== PANSY Incoherent Scatter Radar ==
Syowa station is home to the Program of the Antarctic Syowa Mesosphere–Stratosphere–Troposphere/Incoherent Scatter (PANSY) incoherent scatter radar, which took its first measurements in 2017.

== Legacy ==
=== 1957 Expedition ===
The station was founded by the inaugural Japanese Antarctic Research Expedition in 1957. In February 1958, the Japanese research vessel Sōya was scheduled to deploy the second team, but couldn't get near the station due to severe weather conditions. The first expedition was then rescued by a helicopter from Sōya, but they had to leave the sled dogs behind. In January 1959, the third team returned back and found that, of the 15 dogs that had been left by the first team at the base, two, Taro and Jiro, had survived.

=== Historic monument ===
A cairn and plaque at the station commemorate Shin Fukushima, a member of the 4th Japanese Antarctic Research Expedition, who died in October 1960 while carrying out his duties. The cairn, which contains some of his ashes, was erected on 11 January 1961 by his colleagues. It has been designated a Historic Site or Monument (HSM 2) following a proposal by Japan to the Antarctic Treaty Consultative Meeting.

== In popular culture ==
- Syowa Station is the Antarctic destination of the protagonists of A Place Further than the Universe, a 2018 Japanese anime series.
- The monster Ghidorah is located on the base — called "Outpost 32" — in the 2019 film Godzilla: King of the Monsters.
- Syowa Station is depicted in the 1983 film Antarctica.
- The establishment of Syowa Station is dramatized in Nankyoku Tairiku, a 2011 Japanese television drama.

== Climate ==
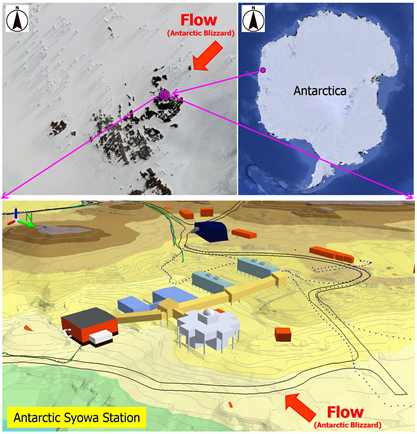
A 3D model of Syowa Station.

The climate is classified as an Ice cap climate (Köppen: EF), since there are no months where the average temperature exceeds 0.0 °C (32.0 °F).

Climate data for Syowa Station (1991−2020 normals, extremes 1957−present)
Month	Jan	Feb	Mar	Apr	May	Jun	Jul	Aug	Sep	Oct	Nov	Dec	Year
Record high °C (°F)	10.0 (50.0)	8.0 (46.4)	3.6 (38.5)	0.5 (32.9)	2.8 (37.0)	−0.7 (30.7)	−2.5 (27.5)	−2.8 (27.0)	−1.1 (30.0)	2.6 (36.7)	7.3 (45.1)	9.4 (48.9)	10.0 (50.0)
Mean daily maximum °C (°F)	1.8 (35.2)	−0.6 (30.9)	−4.5 (23.9)	−7.8 (18.0)	−10.6 (12.9)	−11.9 (10.6)	−14.3 (6.3)	−15.2 (4.6)	−15.0 (5.0)	−10.5 (13.1)	−3.5 (25.7)	1.1 (34.0)	−7.6 (18.3)
Daily mean °C (°F)	−0.8 (30.6)	−2.9 (26.8)	−6.8 (19.8)	−10.4 (13.3)	−13.5 (7.7)	−15.2 (4.6)	−17.6 (0.3)	−18.8 (−1.8)	−18.3 (−0.9)	−13.3 (8.1)	−6.3 (20.7)	−1.5 (29.3)	−10.5 (13.1)
Mean daily minimum °C (°F)	−3.7 (25.3)	−5.6 (21.9)	−9.7 (14.5)	−13.4 (7.9)	−16.9 (1.6)	−18.7 (−1.7)	−21.4 (−6.5)	−22.8 (−9.0)	−22.3 (−8.1)	−17.1 (1.2)	−9.9 (14.2)	−4.6 (23.7)	−13.8 (7.2)
Record low °C (°F)	−12.6 (9.3)	−18.2 (−0.8)	−25.2 (−13.4)	−35.9 (−32.6)	−40.5 (−40.9)	−38.3 (−36.9)	−42.7 (−44.9)	−42.2 (−44.0)	−45.3 (−49.5)	−34.7 (−30.5)	−25.0 (−13.0)	−12.9 (8.8)	−45.3 (−49.5)
Average relative humidity (%)	70	70	71	73	69	68	69	68	67	70	68	70	69
Mean monthly sunshine hours	346.7	186.9	118.4	59.8	22.4	0.0	6.2	65.0	144.4	194.1	320.5	414.2	1,894.4
Source: Japan Meteorological Agency

== Works ==
- Antarctica (1983 film)
- A Place Further than the Universe

== See also ==
Syowa
- IATA: none; ICAO: AT25

Summary
- Airport type: Private
- Serves: Syowa
- Location: East Ongul Island
- Time zone: (+3)
- Elevation AMSL: 95 ft (29 m)
- Coordinates: 69°00′22″S 39°35′24″E

Map
- Location of airfield in Antarctica

Runways
Direction	Length		Surface
Direction	ft	m	Surface
17/35	3,274	998	Snow

- List of Antarctic research stations
- List of Antarctic field camps
- List of airports in Antarctica
- Asuka Station
- Dome Fuji Station
- Mizuho Station
