= Tor (research station) =

Tor Station
- Antarctic base
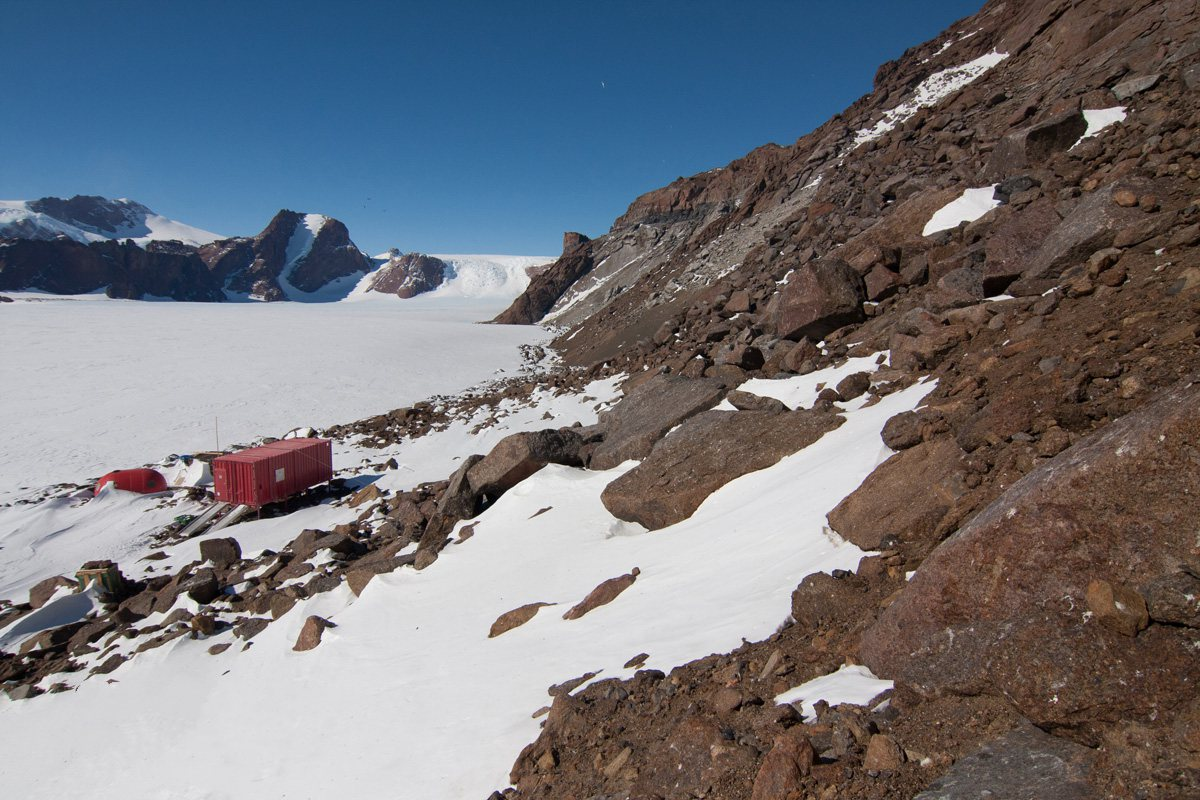
- The Norwegian field station Tor in Antarctica

- Location of Tor Station in Antarctica
- Coordinates: 71°53′22″S 5°09′34″E
- Country: Norway
- Location in Antarctica: Svarthamaren Mountain; Queen Maud Land; Antarctica
- Administered by: Norwegian Polar Institute
- Established: 1993
- Elevation: 1,625 m (5,331 ft)

Population
  - Summer: 3−4
  - Winter: 0
- UN/LOCODE: AQ TOR
- Type: Seasonal
- Period: Summer
- Status: Operational
- Activities: Ornithology
- Website: Tor Field Station; Norwegian Polar Institute

Tor research station is a Norwegian Antarctic research station in Queen Maud Land.

== Overview ==
Tor was established in 1992, for the purpose of ornithological studies.

The Tor station is located in the Svarthamaren Protected Area in Queen Maud Land, the easternmost part of Princess Martha Coast at Svarthamaren Mountain. It is located 1625 metres above sea level, about 200 km from the coast.

Tor is smaller than the Norwegian Troll station, and it is only staffed in the summer.

It is located 91.7 km east of Troll.

== See also ==
- List of Antarctic research stations
- List of Antarctic field camps
- Crime in Antarctica
