= Newman Shoal =

Newman Shoal (68°35′S 77°54′E) is a shoal at the southwest side of Davis Anchorage, just off the Vestfold Hills. The shoal has depths of 1 fathom or less and lies 0.1 nautical miles (0.2 km) southeast of Hobby Rocks. Charted during an ANARE (Australian National Antarctic Research Expeditions) (Thala Dan) hydrographic survey in 1961. Named by Antarctic Names Committee of Australia (ANCA) for A.J. Newman, senior diesel mechanic at Mawson Station in 1961, who assisted with the survey around Davis Station.
