= Hamilton Bluff =

Rock bluff in Antarctica

Hamilton Bluff (69°44′S 73°56′E) is a rock bluff on the coast of Antarctica, about 2 nautical miles (4 km) west of Palmer Point and 10 nautical miles (19 km) west of Mount Caroline Mikkelsen. It was first mapped by Norwegian cartographers from air photos taken by the Lars Christensen Expedition, 1936–37. It was visited by I.R. McLeod, geologist with the Australian National Antarctic Research Expeditions (ANARE) Prince Charles Mountains survey party, 1969, and was named by the Antarctic Names Committee of Australia for R. Hamilton, a helicopter pilot with ANARE (Nella Dan) in 1968.
