= Anchorage Patch =

Small, isolated shoal within Davis Anchorage

- Location within Antarctica

Geography
- Location: Davis Anchorage
- Coordinates: 68°34′S 77°55′E
- Archipelago: Princess Elizabeth Land
- Highest elevation: 11 m (36 ft)

Anchorage Patch (68°34′S 77°55′E) is a small, isolated shoal, the least depth of water over it being 11 metres (6 fathoms), lying within Davis Anchorage, about 1 kilometre (0.5 nmi) northwest of the Torckler Rocks. The shoal was positioned by d'A. T. Gale, an Australian National Antarctic Research Expeditions surveyor aboard the Thala Dan in 1961.
