= Research station =

Facility for scientific research

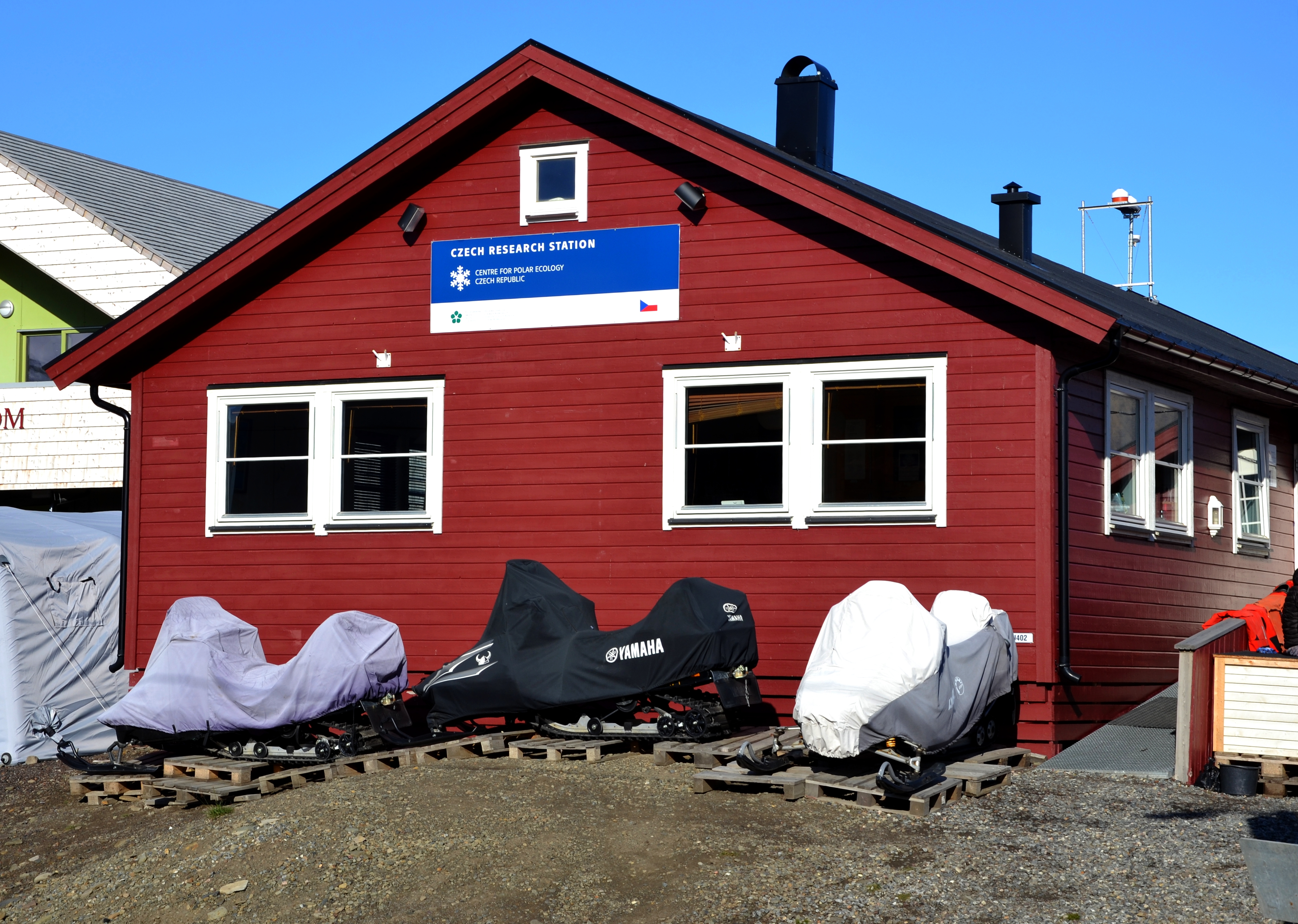
Czech Arctic Research Station

Research stations are facilities where scientific investigation, collection, analysis and experimentation occurs. A research station is a facility that is built for the purpose of conducting scientific research. There are also many types of research stations including: biological field stations, space stations etc. Research station sites might include remote areas of the world, oceans, as well as in space, such as the International Space Station. Biological research stations developed during a time of European colonization and imperialism where naturalists were employed to conduct observations on fauna and flora. Today, the discipline is represented by a number of organizations which span across multiple continents. Some examples include: the Organization of Biological Field Stations and the Organization for Tropical Studies.

Space stations were also developed over a number of decades through scientific analysis and writing, with the first design aspects of early space stations being introduced by Herman Potocnik in 1928. Since then, the construction and launch of space stations have been both national and international, collaborative efforts which have allowed different design philosophies to form key space stations such as the International Space Station (ISS). Similarly, stations in Antarctica are built to ensure that they are well insulated against the sub-zero temperatures of the exterior landscape with many redevelopments being required over the years to overcome issues associated with snowdrifts, accessibility and rusting.

== Types ==
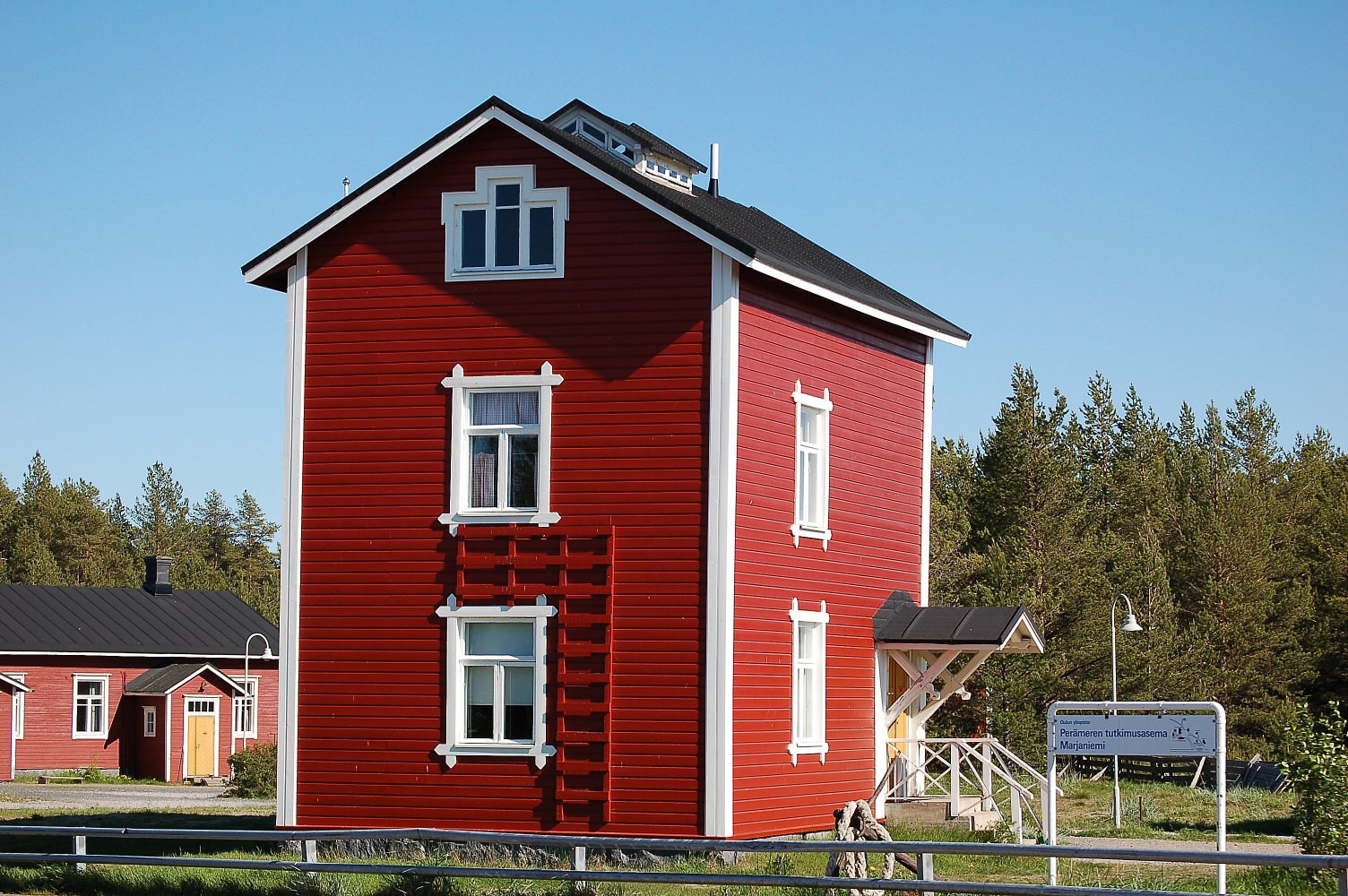
A wooden Bothnian Bay Research Station of the University of Oulu in Marjaniemi, Hailuoto, Finland

Some research stations are located in the Arctic, such as the Northeast Science Station, McGill Arctic Research Station and Himadri Station. Some stations in the Arctic are staffed drifting ice stations, built on the ice of the high latitudes of the Arctic Ocean. Many nations also have research stations located in Antarctica; Showa Station, Halley and Troll are examples. There are also various research stations doing field ecological research such as the Tiputini Biodiversity Station in the Ecuadorian Amazon, Comoé National Park Research Station in the Savannas of North-eastern Côte d'Ivoire or the Gombe Research Station in Tanzania, where famous chimpanzee research was conducted by Jane Goodall.

=== Biological research stations ===
Biological field stations or ecological research stations are facilities where research can be conducted into different aspects of the environmental and biological life. It covers a wide range of field stations including: marine research stations, tropical research stations etc. During the 18th and early 19th century, field stations were not yet formally established, and European naturalists and biologists would conduct their research through imperial scientific explorations. This time period occurred within the time of imperialism and colonial expansion which began from the mid-18th century, which was where European countries, which undergoing industrialization, were in the process of seeking to invade and conqueror territories around the world. Naturalists were often enlisted on imperial campaigns to "undiscovered" territories to assist in the cataloging and mapping of foreign specimens. For example, in 1813, Charles Darwin was appointed the naturalist on the Royal Navy ship, HMS Beagle, and his diary journals from that voyage contributed significantly to his later scientific theories on evolution and natural selection. Similarly, Joseph Banks was also an English naturalist who was appointed the botanist of imperial collaboration between the Royal Navy Society scientific expedition in 1768 on HMS Endeavour to the South Pacific which was heralded as the discovery of Australia or Terra Nullius as it was known at the time.

In the mid – late 19th century, biological stations were formalized and began to be built around the world. In Europe, some early field stations (which are still in operation today) included Concarneau Marine Biological Station (Station de biologie marine de Concarneau) which was founded in 1859 in Concarneau, France. Concarneau Marine Biological Station is a marine biology station which was founded by Victor Coste for the purposes of conducting research into coastal fishing by the request of Napoleon III. In Asia, an example of an early field station includes the Misaki Marine Biological Station was founded in Japan in 1886 with the purpose of investigating the abundant fauna of Sagami Bay that is it was situated across from.

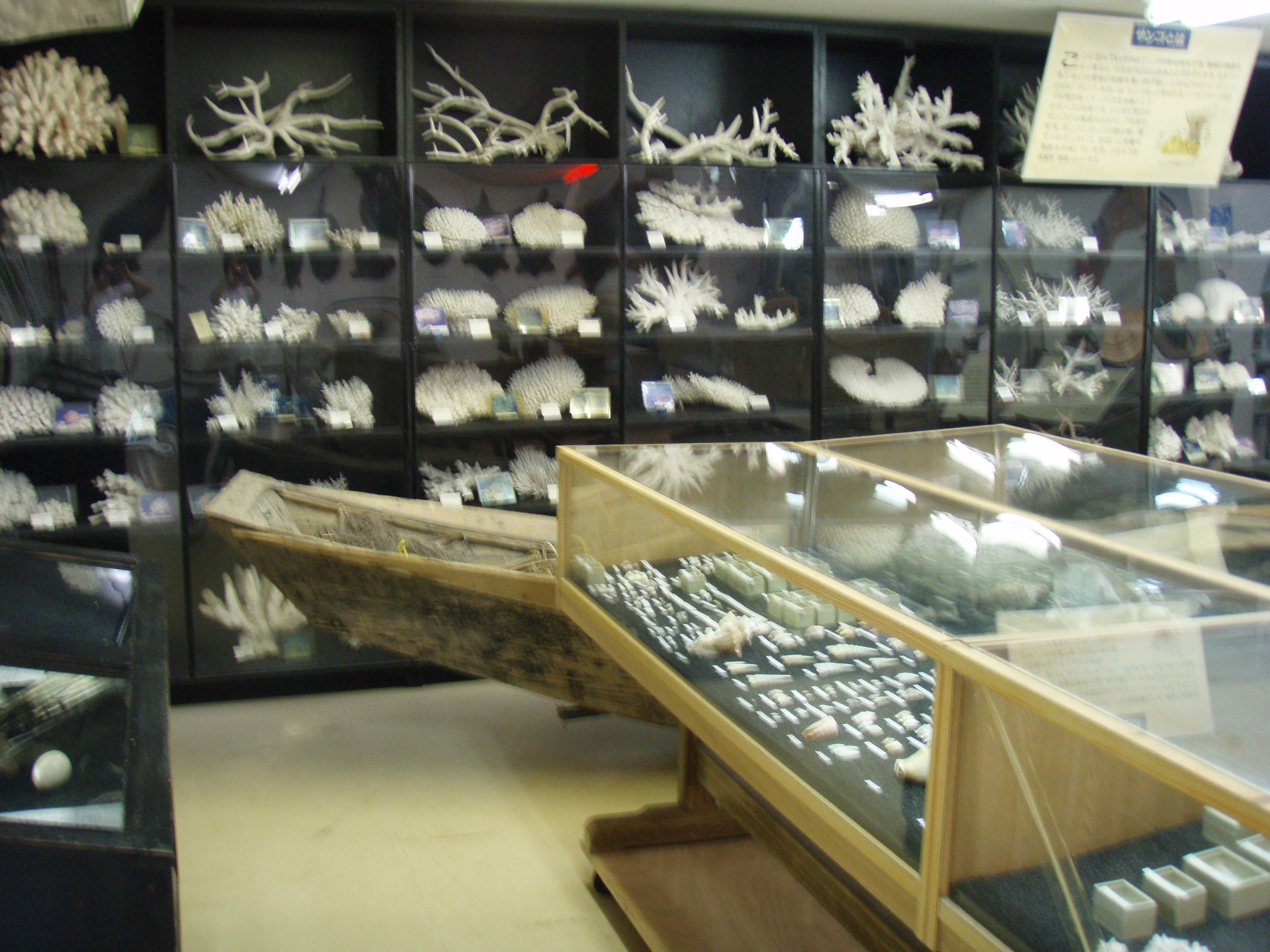
Kuroshima Research Station in Kuroshima, Okinawa.

The increased interest in building biological field stations grew with the era known as the Heroic Age of Antarctic Exploration which was a period beginning in the late 19th century where European explorers were in competition to explore and establish scientific presence on the Antarctic continent. However, the formation of biological field stations became stagnant during international disruptions of World War I and World War II. After World War II, the number of biological research stations around the world increased significantly with 92 stations being established in the 1950s alone. It was during the post-war period that multiple multinational and regional organizations surrounding biological field stations were formed. The most prominent is the non-profit organization known as the Organization of Biological Field Stations was founded in 1963. This organization was formed with the goal of representing and unifying the work of research centers from North America, Central America and Canada. It currently has 180 member stations. Another biological non-profit is the Organization for Tropical Studies which was founded in 1963 and consists of approximately 50 institutions worldwide. Its three goals consist of 1) furthering scientific discovery and knowledge, 2) expanding the educational scope of tropical natural resources and 3) helping to shape policies that will impact these regions. It provides both undergraduate and graduate programs to students in the fields of field biology, ecology, global health, and conservation and allows students to perform hands-on work in both African and South American continents. There are also numerous other organizations and institutes, both public and private, around the world that support the funding, approval and maintenance of biological research stations. Tropical and subtropical research stations have a high conservation return on investment with for instance in Africa deforestation being 22% less near field stations compared to matched sites at a distance

=== Space stations ===
Space stations are not stationary buildings unlike normal research stations on Earth, they are specially created mobile spacecraft that are built to allow a group of human researchers and crew to inhabit over a span of anywhere from months and even a year. Space stations are intended to be permanently operating in space unlike other kinds of space craft such as satellites. However, it may not be permanently inhabited by human researchers who may come and go as they cycle through different explorations. Space stations are typically controlled by their own respective space agency and country. The design for space stations evolved over multiple decades. The engineering and design aspects of a space station was first introduced by Herman Potocnik in 1928. His "Wohnrad" also known as "Living Wheel" consisted of a rotating wheel-shaped space station consisting of three parts: a habitat rotation wheel, an observatory, and a machine room. The Wohnrad's habitat wheel consisted of habitation units, laboratories and observatories which would measure 30 meters in diameter and whose centrifugal force would generate a sense of gravity for the crew members. The theme of gravity being artificially produced through the rotation of the space station was first detailed by Wernher Von Braun in the 1950s which maintained a similar concept of a rotating wheel. The International Space Station (ISS) is one of the biggest space stations in the world and it is permanently inhabited. The first parts of the stations were launched in 1998. It operates in a low Earth orbit which means that relatively closer to the Earth's surface. This can be anywhere from 1000 km to just 160 km above the surface of the Earth.

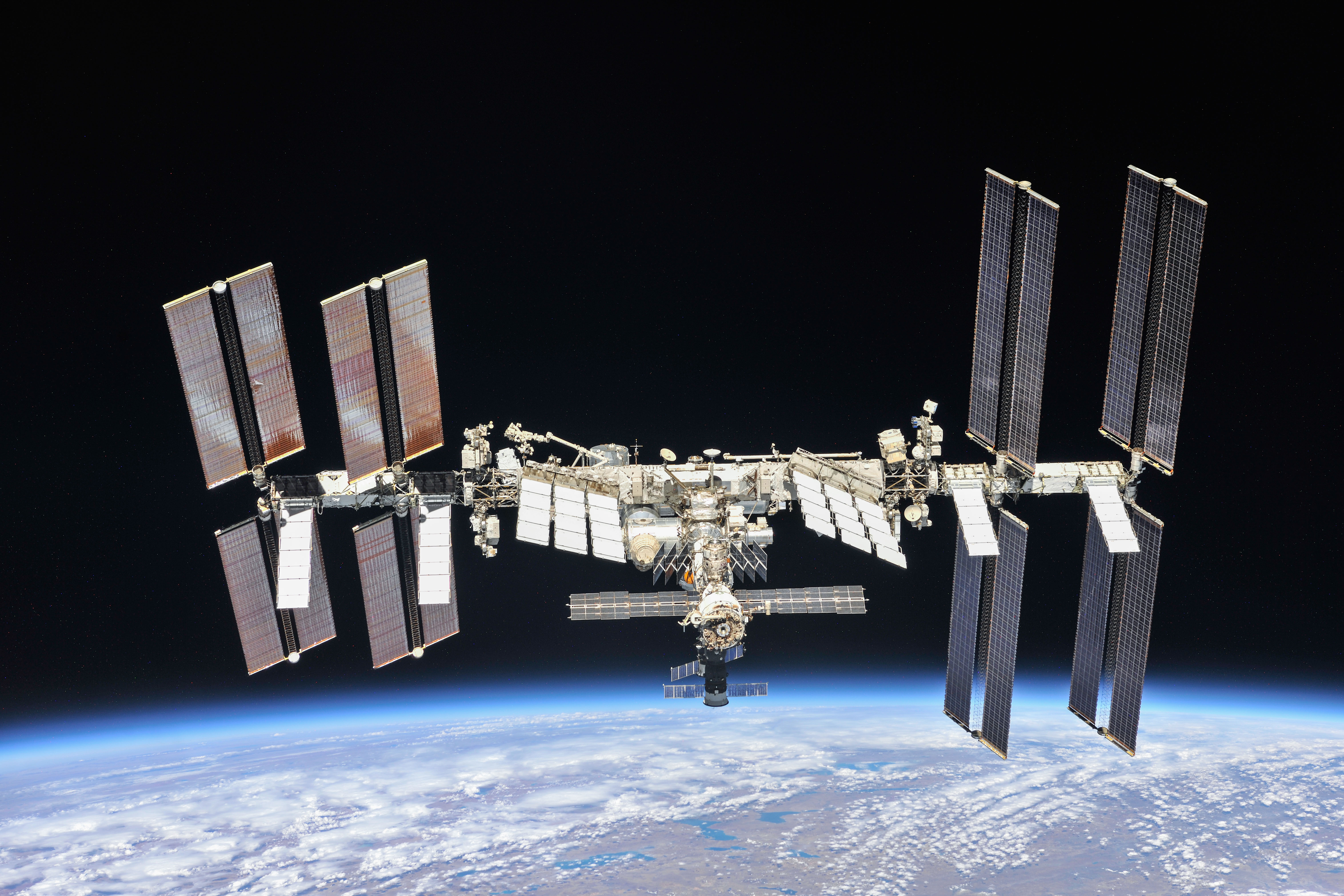
International Space Station (ISS)

The ISS is a collaborative effort by multiple space agencies around the world. The countries involved in the funding of the stations includes Europe, Japan, Canada, Russia and the United States. The respective space agencies of these countries are ESA, JAXA, CSA, Roscosmos, NASA. The modularity and size of components of the research station were dictated by the use of the space shuttle as the primary launch vehicle. The components also needed to be durable and maintainable. In the earlier years the development of the ISS in the 1990s, different countries brought different philosophies and approaches to the construction, design and transportation of research stations. Russian engineers emphasized automated use and remote control in their designs. The United States, Japanese and European nations were guided by four, consistent main principles: accessibility, maintainability, modularity and reconfigurability. This affected the construction of interior hardware racks which were built to be replaceable. It also took into account the preferences of the crew members who largely indicated that the interior design of the station would be constructed with distinct floors, ceiling and walls. The ISS is set to be retired around the end of the 2020s. The only other occupied space station in low Earth orbit is the Chinese space station, Tiangong. Tiangong was launched in 2021 and follows its predecessors Tiangong-1 and Tiangong-2 which were first launched in 2011 and 2016 respectively. This space station was the largest spacecraft built by China, weighing 22.5 tons or 49604.01 pounds.

=== Antarctic research stations ===
Antarctica has around 50 research stations and from around 1000 to 5000 people who reside in those stations around the year. The continent itself is a polar desert which consists of uninhabitable ice-filled environment. It is governed by around 30 countries facilitated through the Antarctic Treaty System (ATS). Since 1959 when this treaty was enacted, 42 countries have become signatories to it and have established research stations in Antarctica. Research stations in Antarctica operate on a seasonal basis in accordance with its Summer and Winter. This is as temperatures have a large variation between the two seasons with temperature exceeding +10 °C in Summer and dropping to under −40 °C in Winter in the coastal parts of the continent. Most operations are carried out in the Summer where temperatures are higher. The majority of research stations in Antarctica are located in these coastal regions with a large number being clustered alongside the peninsula of the continent.

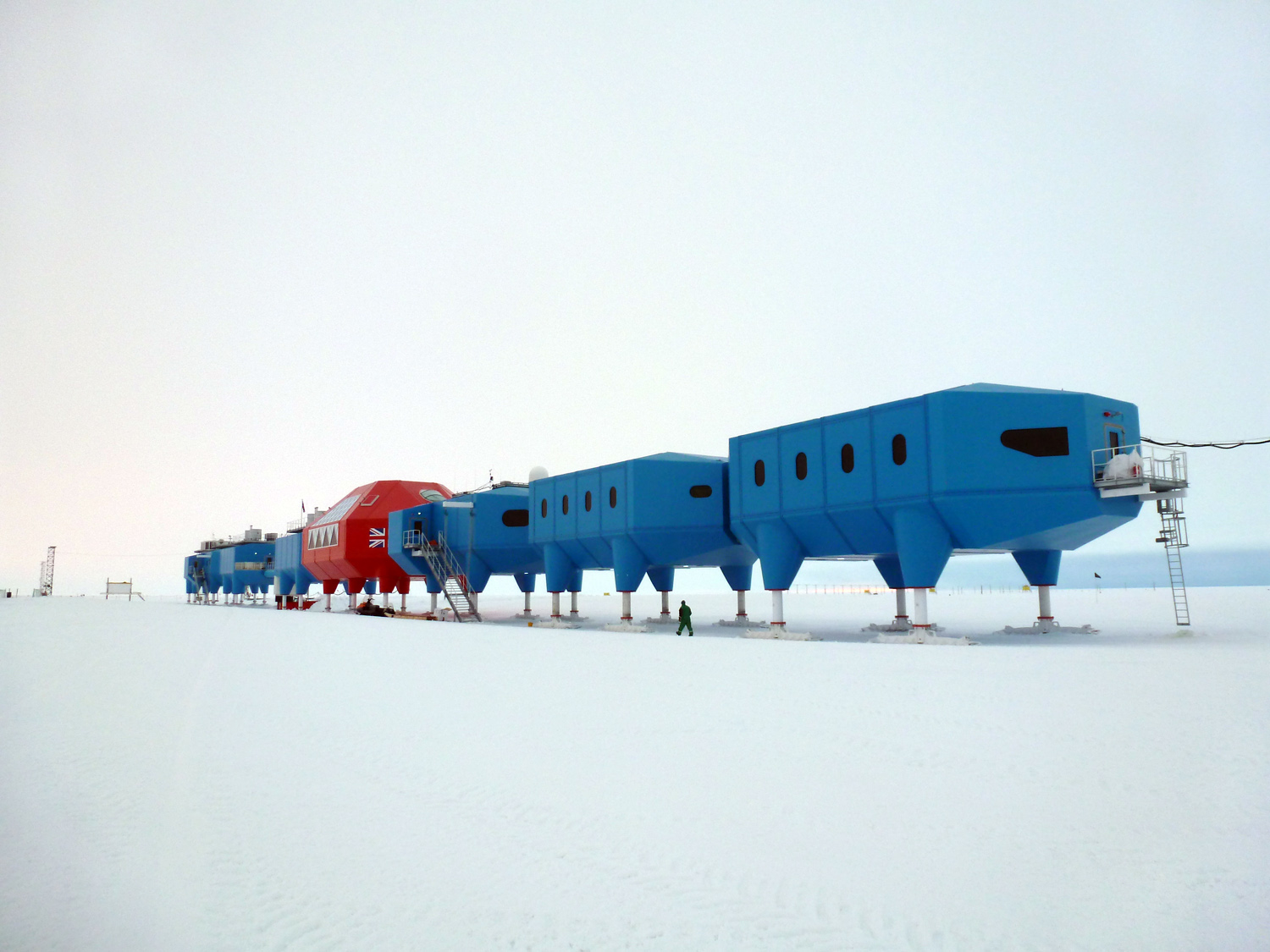
Halley VI Antarctic Research Station on the Brunt Ice Shelf, Antarctica

These research stations are built to accommodate for the sub-zero climatic conditions of the region as well as considering the placement and construction of it building itself. Antarctic research stations need to be built in a manner to minimize issues such as insulation, freezing of concrete during the building process and the potential for the accumulation of drifting snow. The process of the construction of research stations on the continent evolved over time to address these issues. Early research bases in Antarctica used by prominent explorers such as Ernest Shackleton and Roald Amundsen during the Heroic Age of Antarctic Exploration consisted of wooden huts and tents. It was not until post World War II when research stations began to be built on a wider and more commercial scale. These post war research stations were made with the aim to be quickly erected and it was often constructed by individuals with little construction experience and knowledge. Research stations during this time were made up of standard cool room panels and utilized expanded Bakelite insulation. This model later evolved to be elevated buildings held aloft by steel scaffolding. This was done in an attempt to address the issue of accumulation of drifting snow so that stations would not be "snowed in". This did occur in 1968, when the Halley Research Station I operated by the British Antarctic Survey (BAS) had to be shut down as it was covered in snow. However, this design did not take into consideration of water vapour moving through the panel insulation which led to rusting of the panel from the inside. Another issue with this design was that limited the function and dimensions of the building. This made the buildings hard to access.

From this period onwards (roughly the late 1960s onwards), multiple designs were trialed to resolve the issues of guy wires which obstructed mobility and to improve the quality of safety and services, as well as reducing cost. Some examples of design elements during this period included fiberglass paneled stations, aluminum window frames and timber panels. However, these designs were not very effective at overcoming the challenge of accumulating snowdrift, frost or maintaining effective insulation. While there were significant challenges to building research stations during this time, there were also some building innovations that developed from this period of architectural experimentation in the region. Engineers found that buildings could be constructed to be parallel to the direction of the wind to prevent the accumulation of snowdrift. Another discovery that engineers made was that the structural foundations of research stations can be made directly into the rock bed of station sites at sites which were sediment and rock dominant over ice. After this period of trial and error, in the early 2000s, there began a movement to create more consistent, commercialized structures which emphasized durability. A notable example of this was the formation of the design of Halley VI in 2005, which involved a design competition to create the most effective and long-lasting research station suitable for its location on a floating ice shelf. The resulting design consists of an elevated station set on hydraulic stilts which allowed operators to physically move or relocate it out of snow drifts. Bert Buecking, an architect working on designs for India's National Center for Antarctic and Ocean Research's new research station emphasized the importance of this redesign on shifting the approach to the construction of Antarctic research stations, "when the U.K. built Halley VI, many nations realized the importance of doing something special, and not just doing something." Similarly, the Australian Antarctic Building System (AANBUS) has claimed to set the standard for design in the Antarctic by utilizing braced steel framed structures, insulated panels and vapour barriers to overcome previous design and practicality issues.

== See also ==
- List of research stations in the Arctic
- Observatory
- Human outpost
- Space station
- International Space Station (ISS)
