= KRAT =

KRAT or Krat may refer to:

- 3036 Krat, an outer main belt asteroid
- Krasnoyarsk Time, the official time zone for central and east Siberia
- KRAT (Oregon), a defunct radio station (97.7 FM) formerly licensed to serve Altamont, Oregon, United States
- KRAT (FM), a radio station (92.1 FM) licensed to serve Sparks, Nevada, United States
- Krat Rocks, an area of submerged rocks near Antarctica
- Krat (1999), a novel by Danish author Christian Jungersen (born 1962)
- Krat, a fictional city and the main setting of the 2023 video game Lies of P.
- Nick Krat (born 1943), Ukrainian-American soccer player

== See also ==
- 13000krát, 1 2007 album by Slovak singer Misha (Michaela Paľová)
