= Thala Rock =

Site in Antarctica

Coordinates: 68°33′S 77°52′E

Thala Rock is an isolated, submerged rock lying off the Vestfold Hills, about 0.3 nautical miles (0.6 km) from the western point of Turner Island, bearing 250. The depth of water over the rock probably does not exceed 1 fathom. The rock was struck by the Thala Dan on January 16, 1959, when approaching Davis Anchorage with the ANARE (Australian National Antarctic Research Expeditions) relief expedition. Named after the Thala Dan.
