= Icebird (ship) =

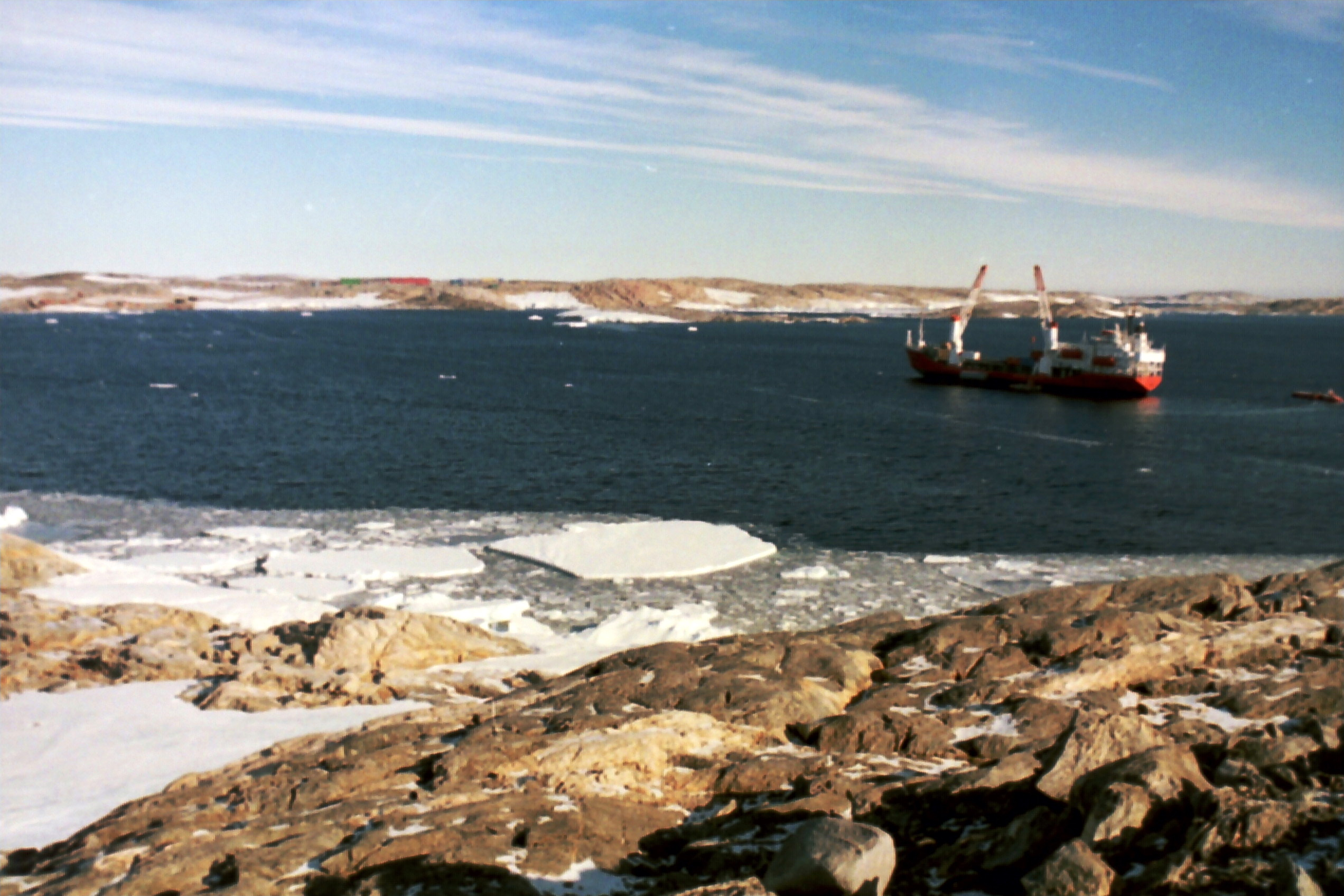
- Icebird in Antarctica, taken from Wilkes Station looking toward Casey Station across Vincennes Bay in 1988

History

W-German
- Name: Icebird
- Owner: Partenreederei MS "Icebird"
- Port of registry: Hamburg
- Builder: H Brand Schiffswerft 29 Oldenburg
- Yard number: 218
- Renamed: Polar Bird
- Identification: IMO number: 8403533; MMSI number: 428051000; Callsign: 4XIF

General characteristics
- Class & type: GL + 100 a4 E4c 1 GMC E4 Aut forepart Arc2
- Type: Cargo
- Tonnage: 4,378 gt (without module)
- Displacement: 6,436 tonnes (without module)
- Length: 109.60 m
- Beam: 19.09 m
- Draft: 5.50/7.65 m
- Depth: 9.80 m
- Decks: Poop,1,2,3,4,A,B,C
- Ice class: Arc 1 / E4 (forepart Arc 2)
- Installed power: MAK 5.400 hps 4.000 kw
- Speed: 14.7 kn
- Boats & landing craft carried: 6
- Crew: 22
- Aircraft carried: Helicopter
- Aviation facilities: Pad
- Notes: Weight of module 310 tonnes

The Icebird is a cargo vessel which delivers supplies to the Australian Antarctic Division (AAD) bases, principally Macquarie Island, Mawson, Casey and Davis Stations. The Icebird's maiden voyage to Antarctica began when she departed from Cape Town, South Africa in November 1984. In 1996, the vessel was renamed Polar Bird.

== Specifications ==
Billed by her builders as the world's first purpose-built polar resupply vessel, the Icebird was custom made for Australian National Antarctic Research Expeditions (ANARE) by Antarktis und Spezialfahrt Schiffartsgesellschaft GmbH (GSS) in Germany.

Due to the large-scale rebuilding program underway at Australia's stations, the Australian Antarctic Division needed to increase the cargo space available to transport building materials. Icebird's ability to carry containers enabled the rebuilding program to switch over to the AANBUS modular construction that is so characteristic of ANARE's continental stations today.

Icebird's bow was constructed to the latest ice-breaking design, which its owners claimed would allow it to break one-year old ice with continuous speed, and so avoid the constant threat to Antarctic shipping: besetment (being surrounded by ice without helm control).

The vessel was also equipped with a temperature-controlled double skin for both the cargo holds and engine room, maintained by circulating heated fuel around the ship. It carried a helicopter and specially strengthened flight deck. The 'tween-deck hatch covers doubled as pontoons, accompanied by an ice-strengthened pusher barge, features which would permit offloading cargo in remote areas.

"It was a standard box construction, superstructure aft with side cranes. But it gave you tremendous capability - you just opened the top of the ship ... and dropped everything in and closed it up and off you went," said John Whitelaw, the Acting Assistant Director of Operations, describing the ship's unique cargo facilities.

"Icebird was fitted with a detachable accommodation module that could carry 100 passengers. It was clamped to the ship in front of the bridge and was secured with bolts," according to an interview with John Whitelaw and Annie Rushton, ANARE Jubilee Project, 21 August 1995.

== Fitout ==
Icebird fitments include:

- dishwashers
- videos
- bar
- two-bed hospital and surgery
- air-conditioning
- laundry service

== Master ==
The master for many years in the 1980s was Captain Ewald Brune (1951-) from Germany. He achieved 88 voyages and 25 years of Polar Maritime activity in all regions of Antarctica.

== Icebreaking ==
Icebreaking class: Germanischer Lloyd 2002 Pt. 1, Sec. 15-A,B

== Nella Dan rescue ==
The Icebird participated in the rescue of over 100 expeditioners and crew from the Nella Dan, which was wrecked on Macquarie Island on the evening of 3 December 1987, during resupply operations at Macquarie Island. At the time the Icebird was returning to Hobart from Davis Station in Antarctica. She arrived at Buckles Bay on 8 December 1987.

== Decommissioning and revival ==
The Icebird remained on charter to ANARE until 1994, when it was decided that Australia's Antarctic program should revert to a one ship option as a cost-cutting measure, one which aroused considerable concern within the ANARE community.

Only two years later, during the 1998-99 season, the Aurora Australis was temporarily out of service, and a replacement ship was hired - the Icebird. Reborn under the new name of Polar Bird, and now with Norwegian owners, the Polar Bird has been chartered several years since by ANARE.

In 2003, Polar Bird was replaced by Vasiliy Golovnin. The vessel was sold to Dynamic Shipping Services, Israel, and was renamed Almog (Hebrew: אלמוג, "coral").

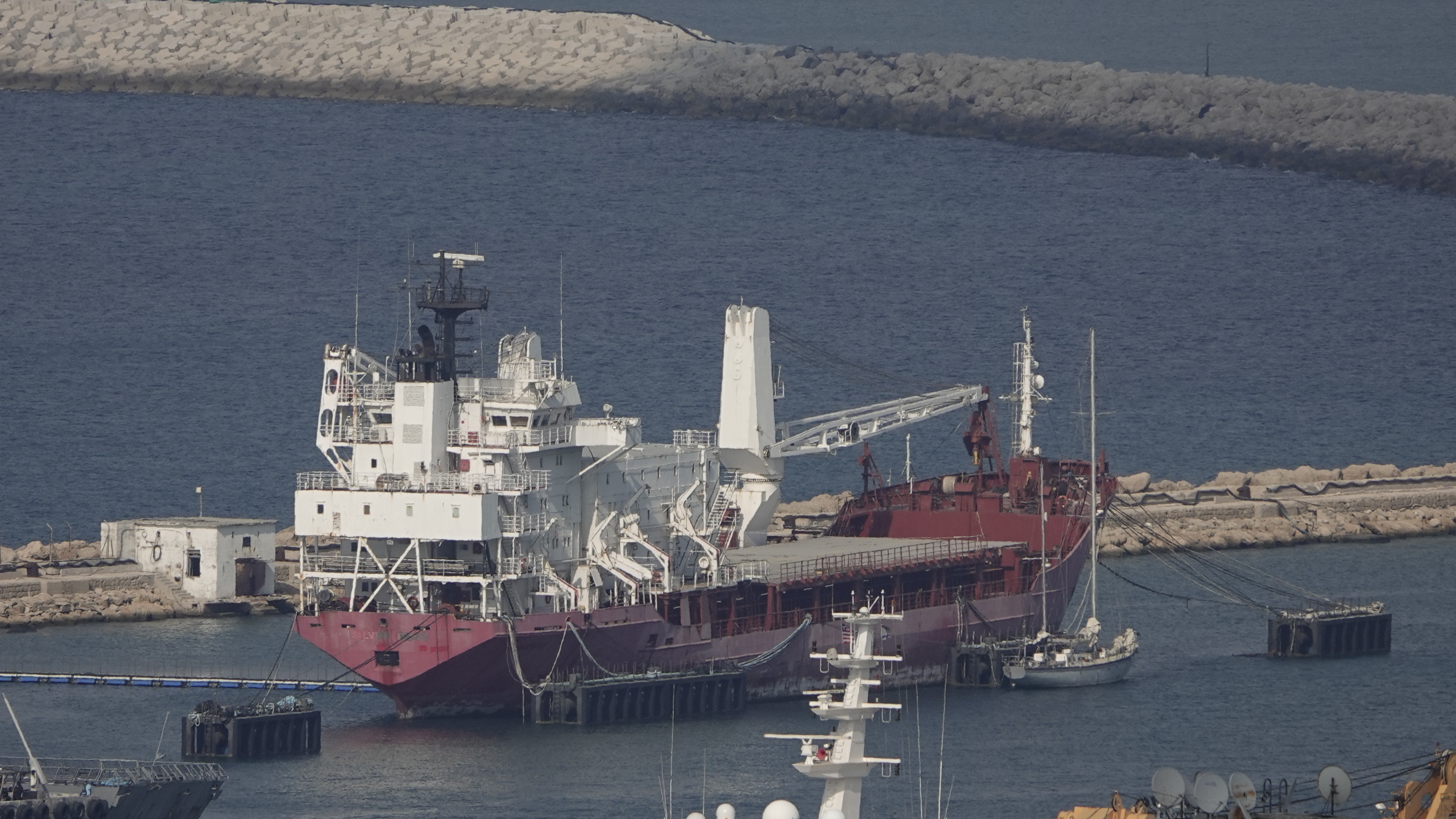
Silver Rose abandoned at the Port of Haifa, July 2023

It was again renamed Silver Rose later on (in 2017 or 2018). Ultimately, it was abandoned in the Port of Haifa, Israel, no later than 2019, and remains there, as of 2023.
