= Palmer Point =

Rock point on the coast of Antarctica

Palmer Point (69°43′S 74°2′E) is a rock point on the coast of Antarctica, about 2 nautical miles (3.7 km) west of Strover Peak and 8 nautical miles (15 km) west-northwest of Mount Caroline Mikkelsen. Photographed by U.S. Navy Operation Highjump, 1946–47. Visited by I.R. McLeod, geologist with the ANARE (Australian National Antarctic Research Expeditions) Prince Charles Mountains survey party, 1969. Named by Antarctic Names Committee of Australia (ANCA) for J. Palmer, helicopter pilot with ANARE (Nella Dan) in 1968.
