= Hamm Peak =

Mountain in Antarctica

Hamm Peak (69°43′S 74°8′E) is a small rock peak just back from the coast of Antarctica, standing close south of Strover Peak and 6 nautical miles (11 km) west-northwest of Mount Caroline Mikkelsen. It was first mapped by Norwegian cartographers from air photos taken by the Lars Christensen Expedition, 1936–37, and was named by the Antarctic Names Committee of Australia for G.F. Hamm, officer in charge at Mawson Station in 1968, who established a survey station on the feature.
