= Icebird =

Icebird may refer to:

- Icebird (ship), an icebreaker ship chartered for many years by the Australian Government for research expeditions to Antarctica
- Icebird (band), an American indie rock band
- Icebird, a character in the Transformers Beast Wars series
- "Icebird", a music collaboration of singer Son Little and producer RJD2
- "Ice Bird", a character in Angry Birds Space
