= Nel Law =

Australian artist, first Australian woman to set foot in Antarctica

Nelle "Nel" Isabel Law (1914–1990) was an Australian artist, poet and diarist. As the wife of the scientist and explorer Phillip Law, she was the first Australian woman to set foot in Antarctica on 8 February 1961 when she travelled with her husband to the Mawson Station.

== Biography ==
Law met her husband at Melbourne University. They were married for over 40 years but decided not to have children due to a congenital heart condition. When Phil Law decided to take her to Antarctica, he had her smuggled onto the ship in Perth. There were heated discussions before the ship set off but it was finally decided that if Nel Law was escorted off the ship, it would create too much negative publicity. In fact, quite the opposite occurred when she remained on board as this led to fantastic publicity for Phil and ANARE (Australian National Antarctic Research Expeditions).

Law, a talented artist, produced a number of oils, water colours and sketches while she was at the base. She had been appointed to make graphic records by ANARE. She had accompanied her husband on the Magga Dan. Her work developed from somewhat Expressionistic landscapes to far more abstract works, even when she was painting penguins. In 2005–06, a collection of her drawings was presented by the Tasmanian Museum and Art Gallery who also hold some of her paintings in their permanent collection. In 1965, Law founded the Antarctic Wives Association of Australia, later known as the Antarctic Family and Friends Association. She was the association's first president and later patron. Now part of the ANARE Club, the association was intended to provide a social link and support for the wives of expeditioners.

The University of Melbourne holds a large collection of Law's works which include correspondence, news clippings, poems, sketches and diaries. Her diaries contain drafts of her Breaking New Ice: Australia's First Woman To Visit Antarctica which had been prepared for publication.

The Danish-built icebreaker MV Nella Dan which served Australia's Antarctic programme was named in her honour.

Nel Law died in June 1990. Her ashes, together with those of her husband Phillip, were interred near the Mawson Station, Antarctica, on 19 June 2011.
