= Torckler Rocks =

Group of rock islands in Antarctica

Torckler Rocks (68°35′S 77°56′E) are three small islands lying at the north side of the entrance to Heidemann Bay, Vestfold Hills. Mapped by Norwegian cartographers from air photos taken by the Lars Christensen Expedition, 1936–37. Remapped from ANARE (Australian National Antarctic Research Expeditions) air photos and named for R.M. Torckler, radio officer at Davis Station in 1959.
