= Suter Island =

Island in Antarctica

Suter Island (68°36′S 77°54′E) is a small island off the Vestfold Hills, lying 0.5 miles (0.8 km) southwest of the south entrance point to Heidemann Bay. It was mapped by Norwegian cartographers from air photos taken by the Lars Christensen Expedition, 1936–37. It was named by Antarctic Names Committee of Australia (ANCA) for William James (Bill) Suter, cook at Davis Station in 1960.

== See also ==
- List of antarctic and sub-antarctic islands
