= Krat Rocks =

The Krat Rocks (68°34′S 77°54′E) are an area of submerged rocks with a least depth of about 1 metre (3 ft), lying at the west side of Davis Anchorage, 0.8 nautical miles (1.5 km) south of Bluff Island, off the Vestfold Hills, Ingrid Christensen Coast, Antarctica. The reef was delineated by d'A.T. Gale, an Australian National Antarctic Research Expeditions surveyor aboard the Thala Dan in 1961, and was named by the Antarctic Names Committee of Australia after Ingemann Krat, Danish chief engineer on the Thala Dan.
