= KRAT (Oregon) =

- Altamont, Oregon; United States
- Broadcast area: Klamath Falls, Oregon
- Frequency: 97.7 MHz

Programming
- Format: Defunct

Ownership
- Owner: Sandra Soho; (George J. Wade)

History
- First air date: 1991
- Last air date: November 18, 2009 (date of license cancellation)
- Former call signs: KPMA (1988–1990); KCHQ (1990–1997)
- Former frequencies: 101.3 MHz
- Call sign meaning: "Rat"

Technical information
- Facility ID: 71963
- Class: A
- ERP: 560 watts
- HAAT: 5 meters (16 ft)
- Transmitter coordinates: 42°12′54″N 121°42′13″W

KRAT (97.7 FM, "97.7 The Rat") was a radio station licensed to serve the community of Altamont, Oregon, United States. The station, ordered off the air by the FCC in 2009, was last owned by Sandra Soho and the broadcast license was issued in the name of George J. Wade.

== Programming ==
KRAT broadcast an oldies music format, branded as "The Rat", to the Klamath Falls, Oregon, area. Syndicated programs on KRAT included a weekend show hosted by Ron Norwood called The Doo-Wop Express.

== History ==
=== The beginning ===
Peter W. Moncure received the original construction permit from the Federal Communications Commission for a new 100,000 watt station broadcasting on a frequency of 101.3 MHz on March 22, 1988. The new station was assigned the call sign KPMA by the FCC on August 8, 1988. Three weeks later, on August 29, 1988, Peter W. Moncure applied to the FCC to transfer the construction permit for this station to Western States Broadcasting. The transfer was approved by the FCC on November 2, 1988, and the transaction was consummated on November 29, 1988.

=== The 1990s ===
In September 1989, the station applied for a modification of its construction permit to change to a Class C1 station with a reduced effective radiated power of 60,000 watts with an antenna height above average terrain of 260 meters (850 ft). The FCC granted the authority for these changes on August 1, 1990. The station was assigned the call sign KCHQ by the FCC on November 15, 1990.

In May 1991, the station applied for a license to cover the construction permit and begin licensed operation. The FCC accepted the application for filing but took no action on it for nearly eight years before they dismissed the application as moot on February 4, 1999.

In September 1996, Western States Broadcasting announced that they had agreed to sell this station to George J. Wade. After overcoming an informal objection filed by Wynne Broadcasting Company, Inc., the deal was finally approved by the FCC on January 23, 1997, and the transaction was consummated on January 24, 1997.

=== Move to 97.7 ===
In February 1997, KCHQ filed an application with the FCC to change its broadcast frequency to 97.7 MHz and make other changes to the transmitter location and antenna height plus dramatically reduce its effective radiated power as a Class A station. The FCC granted authorization for these changes on October 27, 1997. The station was assigned new call sign KRAT by the FCC on May 1, 1997.

KRAT applied for authority to operate on an interim basis in January 1998. The FCC granted this authorization on June 19, 1998, with a scheduled expiration date of December 19, 1999. KRAT received its license to cover from the FCC on July 30, 1999.

=== Trouble ahead ===
The station filed a new application in April 1999 to increase their effective radiated power to 22,000 watts, raise the antenna to 522 meters (1,713 ft) in height above average terrain, relocate the transmitter southwest to 42°10'6"N, 122°09'10"W, and return to Class C1 operation. The FCC accepted this application for filing on May 13, 1999, but as of May 21, 2009, more than ten years later, had taken no further action. An engineering amendment to address concerns raised by the original application was filed on March 13, 2002, and accepted for filing on March 14, 2002, but it too had not yet been acted upon by the FCC.

In January 2006, KRAT filed a routine license renewal with the FCC. This application was ultimately dismissed by the Commission on April 20, 2007, and flagged as a "red light dismissal" in the station's FCC database entry. Under the provisions of the "Red Light Rule" per the Debt Collection Improvement Act of 1996, the FCC is required to "withhold action on applications and other requests for benefits when the entity applying for or seeking benefits is delinquent in non-tax debts owed to the Commission, and to dismiss such applications or other request if the delinquency is not resolved."

=== The end ===
Despite these issues, the station was operational through November 2009 although not inconsiderable legal, financial, and technical challenges remained ahead for KRAT and its licensee. On November 18, 2009, KRAT was finally and irrevocably ordered off the air by the FCC.
