= Heidemann Bay =

Bay in Antarctica

Heidemann Bay (68°35′S 77°58′E) is a bay, 1 nautical mile (2 km) long, indenting the seaward end of Breidnes Peninsula in the Vestfold Hills of Antarctica, just south of Davis Station. It was mapped by Norwegian cartographers from air photos taken by the Lars Christensen Expedition, 1936–37. The bay was first visited by an Australian National Antarctic Research Expeditions party from the Kista Dan on January 11, 1957, and was named for Frank Heidemann, second mate of the Kista Dan. Heidemann Bay which was gouged by glaciers is flanked by two small peninsulas which rise approximately 20 metres above sea level. Heidemann Bay is an extension of Heidemann Valley which runs in the same compass direction for a further two kilometres. Heidemann Valley is of uniform elevation and relatively flat but covered in a large number of moraine rocks and boulders.

A few hundred metres from Heidemann Bay in Heidemann Valley was the site of the first soil compaction tests in the early 1980s, to determine if it was feasible to construct a dirt runway in that environment.

Suter Island is a small island lying 0.5 miles (0.8 km) southwest of the south entrance point to Heidemann Bay.
