= Vasiliy Golovnin (ship) =

Cargo ship built in 1988

Vasiliy Golovnin (Russian: «Василий Головнин»; IMO 8723426) is a Russian Project 10620 icebreaking cargo ship built in 1988 in the Ukrainian Soviet Socialist Republic, and named after the Russian navigator, vice admiral Vasily Golovnin (1776–1831). The vessel is operated by Russia's Far East Shipping Company (FESCO).

The Vasiliy Golovnin has regularly been chartered for entire seasons, including by Australia, New Zealand, and Argentina.

On April 29, 2019, TASS reported that 2 crew members died from methanol poisoning.
