= Organization of Biological Field Stations =

- Established: 1963
- Location(s): P.O. Box 400327; Charlottesville, VA 22904-4327, United States
- Website: www.obfs.org

The Organization of Biological Field Stations (OBFS) is a nonprofit multinational organization representing the field stations and research centers across Canada, United States, and Central America. While it has no administrative or management control over its member stations, it helps to improve their effectiveness in research, education, and outreach through various initiatives. This includes promoting the establishment of research networks, working with public agencies to enhance funding sources, and building interactions between scientists and policy makers.

The OBFS collaborates with the National Center for Ecological Analysis and Synthesis (NCEAS), the University of California Natural Reserve System (UC NRS), and the Long Term Ecological Research Network Office in maintaining a comprehensive registry of scientific data sets which may be used in future research projects.

Since its establishment in 1963, the organization has grown to nearly two hundred member stations. With the success, the International Organization of Biological Field Stations (IOBFS) was later created to facilitate the exchange of information and ideas at a larger geographic scale.
