= Hobby Rocks =

Island group in Antarctica

- Location within Antarctica

Geography
- Location: Antarctica
- Coordinates: 68°35′S 77°54′E

Administration
- Administered under the Antarctic Treaty System

Demographics
- Population: Uninhabited

The Hobby Rocks are three small islands lying off the Vestfold Hills in Antarctica, marking the western side of Davis Anchorage. They were mapped by Norwegian cartographers from air photos taken by the Lars Christensen Expedition, 1936–37, remapped from Australian National Antarctic Research Expeditions air photos and named for D. Hobby, a diesel mechanic at Davis Station in 1960.
