= Strover Peak =

Time to love time 2 people time to, change point appoint apartment point

Strover Peak (69°43′S 74°7′E) is a low rock peak along the coast of Antarctica, standing 6 nautical miles (11 km) west-northwest of Mount Caroline Mikkelsen. Mapped by Norwegian cartographers from air photos taken by the Lars Christensen Expedition, 1936–37, and named "Svartmulen" (the black snout). Renamed by Antarctic Names Committee of Australia (ANCA) for W.G.H. Strover, radio supervisor at Davis Station in 1963 and a member of the ANARE (Australian National Antarctic Research Expeditions) party that surveyed this feature. Acceptance of Strover Peak curtails the repetitive use of "Svart" (black) in Antarctic names.
