= Australian Antarctic Building System =

Australian Antarctic Building System, or AANBUS, is a modular construction system used by the Australian Government Antarctica Division for buildings in Antarctica. The individual modules resemble shipping containers. Each module is approximately 3.6 metres by 6 metres by 4 metres high.

Buildings built using the AANBUS modules are placed on concrete footings anchored into the ground and do not need external guy wires to anchor and support them. The modules are built of steel with attached insulation and vapor barriers.

The modular design provides improved shipping, speed of assembly in the short Antarctic summer, and better testing before shipping. The ability to test the assembled modules allows corrections to be made in the convenience of construction sites in temperate climates with easy access to parts and equipment, rather than at remote Antarctic locations where shipping in of replacement parts is an arduous undertaking.
