= Davis Anchorage =

Anchorage in Antarctica

- Location within Antarctica
- Etymology: Davis Station

Geography
- Coordinates: 68°34′S 77°55′E
- Archipelago: Princess Elizabeth Land

Davis Anchorage (68°34′S 77°55′E) is an anchorage in Antarctica about 1 nautical mile (2 km) in extent with general depths of 10 to 13 fathoms (18 to 24 m), lying off Breidnes Peninsula, Vestfold Hills. It is bounded on the west by the Krat Rocks and the Hobby Rocks, and on the east by the rocks and shoal water extending 0.5 nautical miles (1 km) offshore from Davis Station. The anchorage has been used by Australian National Antarctic Research Expeditions ships to Davis Station, for which it is named, since 1957.

== See also ==
Anchorage Patch
