= MV Nella Dan =

Antarctic research ship

Coordinates: 54°37′S 159°02′E

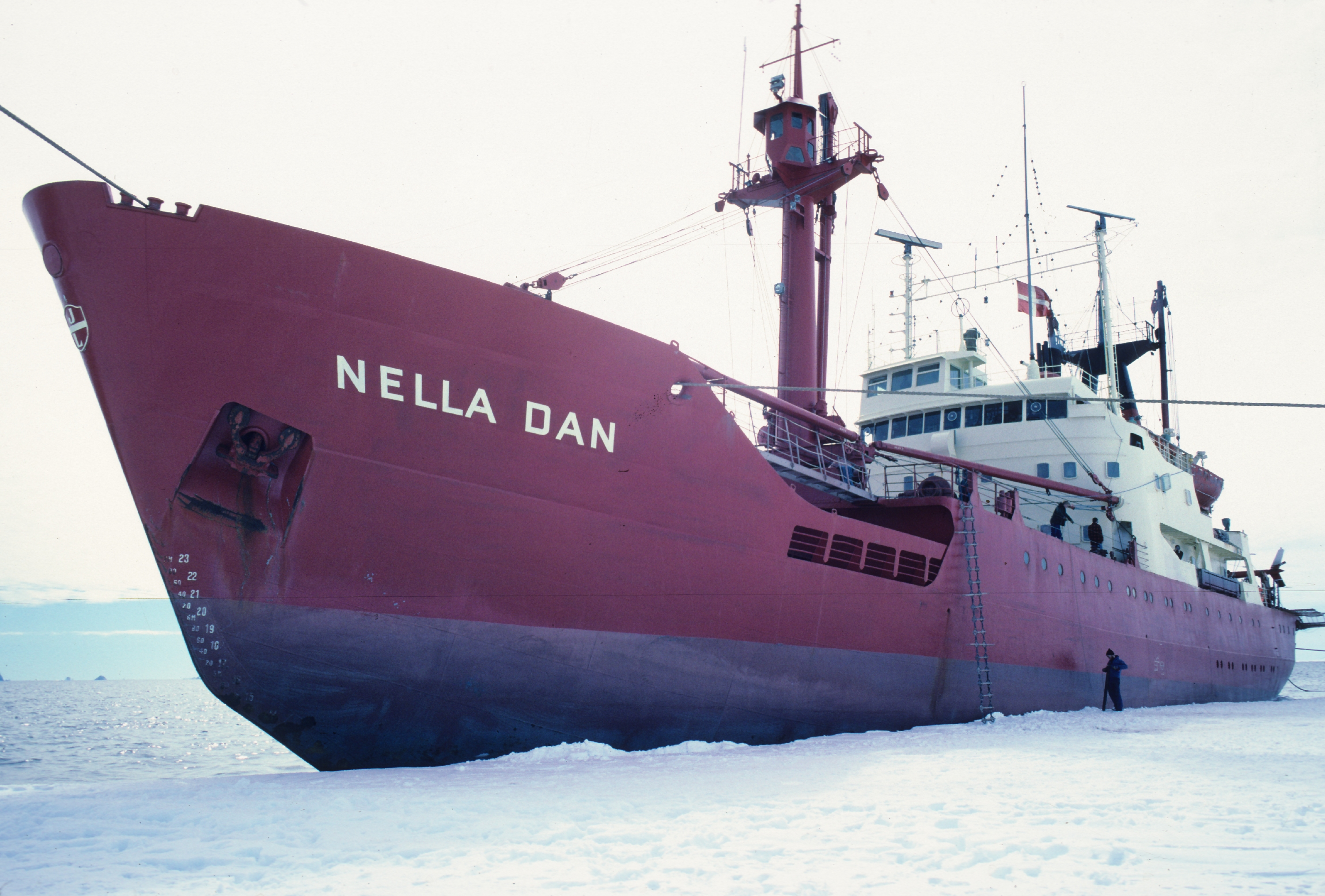
- MV Nella Dan at Mawson Ice edge, Antarctica.

History

Denmark
- Name: Nella Dan
- Owner: J. Lauritzen
- Port of registry: Esbjerg
- Builder: Aalborg Shipyard Pty Ltd
- Yard number: 109
- Launched: 13 June 1961
- Completed: 4 October 1961
- Refit: 1980
- Identification: IMO number: 5248762; Call sign OZKC
- Fate: Wrecked and sunk 1987

General characteristics
- Class & type: Icebreaker class I
- Type: Polar supply vessel
- Tonnage: GRT 2186/2206, NRT 1060
- Length: 75.5 m
- Beam: 14.3 m
- Draft: 6.268 m
- Propulsion: 2520 HP B&W diesel 8-cyl. 2SA 835-VBF-620 engine
- Speed: 12.5 knots
- Aircraft carried: Helicopter deck
- Notes: 32 crew, 42 passengers

MV Nella Dan was one of the famous 'Dan' ships of the Danish J. Lauritzen A/S Lines that were almost synonymous with ANARE (Australian National Antarctic Research Expeditions) shipping through the early years of Australia's official Antarctic program. Others in the fleet included Kista Dan, Magga Dan and Thala Dan.

== Service ==
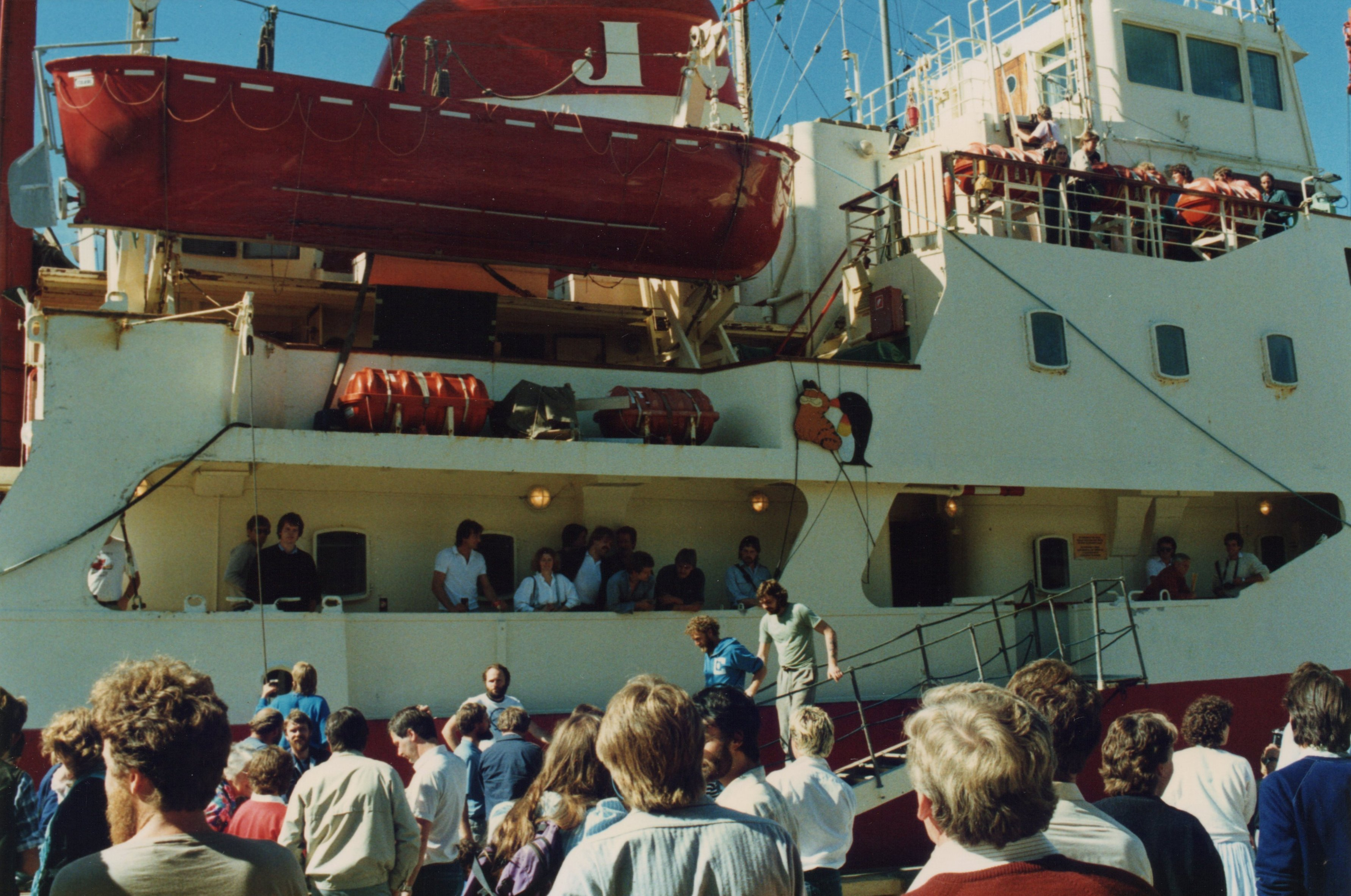
Nella Dan ready to leave Hobart, 1987

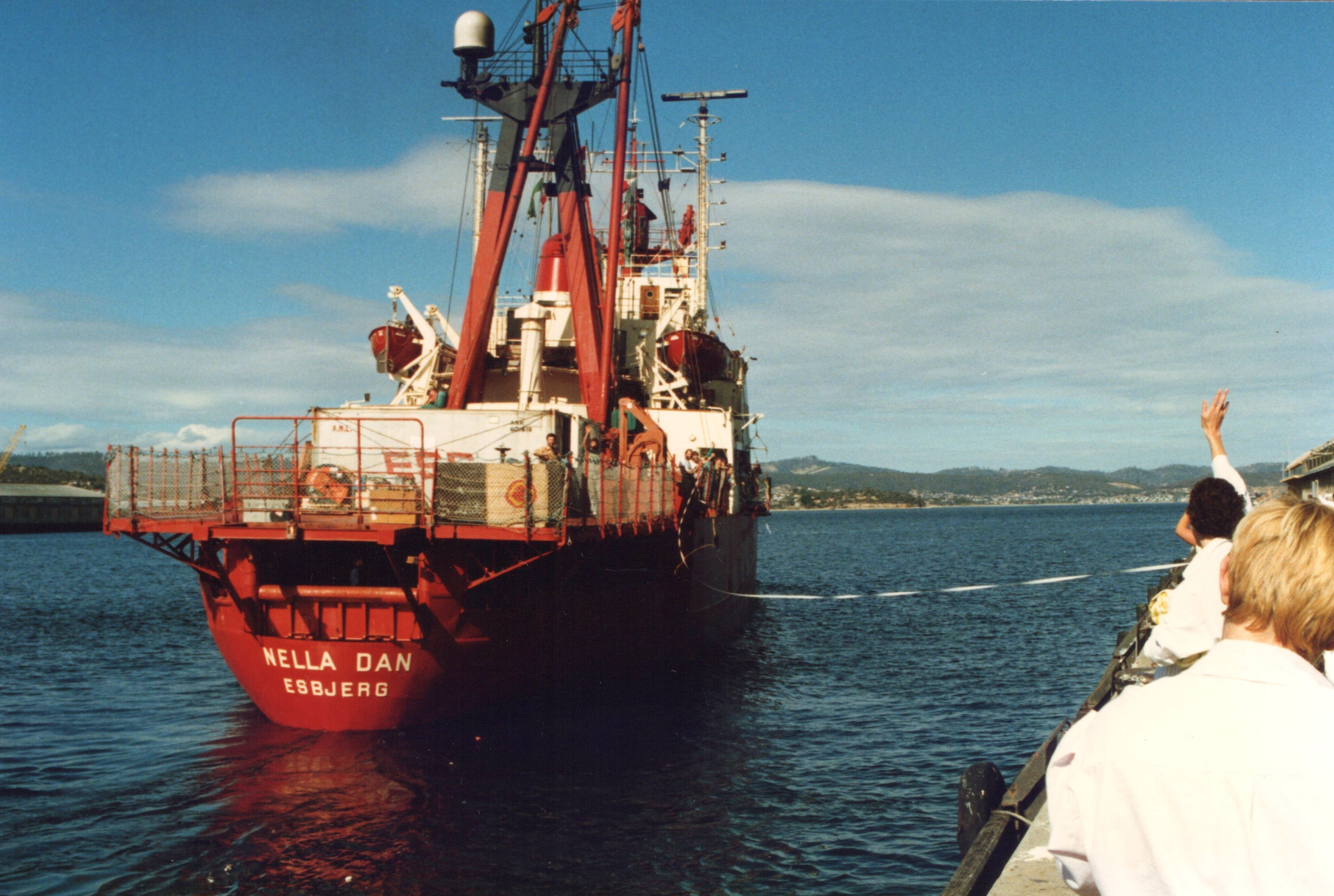
Nella Dan leaving Hobart, 1987

Commissioned by Lauritzen with considerable input from the Australian Antarctic Division, Nella Dan was named in honour of Nel Law, wife of the AAD Director of the time, Phillip Law.

Built by the Aarlborg Shipyard Pty Ltd in 1961, she incorporated all the features of her older sisters, Thala Dan, Kista Dan and Magga Dan. An ice breaker stern, ice fins and ice knife were becoming regular features, but a novel addition was the double hull in the engine room and part of the holds. The ascent to the crow's nest was through the interior of the mast, and the ship supplied its own fresh water with an Atlas generator. At the time of her construction, Nella Dan was regarded as setting the standard for polar vessels.

Nella Dan sailed to the Antarctic every year she was chartered by ANARE, from 1962 to 1987. Her service record remains unchallenged as the longest continuously serving of any Antarctic ship.

=== Besetment (locked in the ice) in 1985 ===
Nella Dan enjoyed the dubious distinction of plunging her passengers into an unexpected seven-week stationary sojourn in the ice in 1985, the longest besetment (being surrounded by ice without helm control) ever experienced by any ANARE ship. She was eventually released from besetment by digging the ice away from the hull. At that time, the Japanese icebreaker Shirase rushed to assist the trapped vessel. Nella Dan finally followed the trail of Shirase and got away from the iced-over ocean.

=== Final Voyage ===
On her last fateful voyage on the evening of 3 December 1987, during resupply operations at Macquarie Island, bad weather blew up. Nella Dan dragged her anchor and was driven aground just metres off the island, while transferring fuel from the ship to the sub-Antarctic station. Other cargo unloading had ceased because of strong winds and high seas. A definitive cause of the accident was never determined, it was reported that Nella Dan dragged her anchor in very heavy seas while at the normal anchorage point in Buckles Bay. The vessel was rapidly washed onto rocks close to the research station it was supplying. Damage to the vessel was immediate and serious, the ship's hull was holed in two places and water flooded the engine room. Most of the expedition staff were ashore at the time of the accident, but 17 expedition staff were aboard together with the crew. There were no casualties or injuries to the crew or expedition personnel.

Several members of the 35 Water Transport Squadron attached to ANARE sailed three LARC (Light Amphibious Resupply Craft) to evacuate the Antarctic expeditioners and ship's crew still on board. For these actions, soldiers Philip Wharton Clark, Kenneth Stanley Barrington, Dudley Raymond Crowe, Timothy Gay, Gregory Dale Kenny, and Alistair Andrew Scott were awarded a Group Bravery Citation by the Australian Governor-General Quentin Bryce on 17 August 2009.

The Macquarie Island station, normally designed to accommodate 32 expeditioners, had to accommodate over 100 people until their rescue. At the time of the accident, Icebird, another vessel chartered by the Australian Antarctic Division, was returning to Hobart from Davis Station in Antarctica. Icebird was immediately diverted to Macquarie Island to pick up the personnel and crew from Nella Dan. She arrived at Buckles Bay on 8 December 1987.

=== Scuttling ===
Within four days of the accident, the owners of Nella Dan, the Danish Lauritzen company, had chartered an oil rig tender, Lady Lorraine, which left Victoria carrying company representatives as well as insurance assessors, a team of divers and salvage experts. To protect the ship from further damage while awaiting possible salvage, the vessel deliberately took on sea water as ballast. This was intended to add sufficient weight to the hull to hold it in position on the rocks and prevent further damage or movement back out to sea. Although having a list of about 11 degrees, the ship was kept in a stable position and was also secured with cables to the shore. When the storm abated all remaining expedition equipment was removed from the ship.

Although plans were initially made to salvage the vessel, the decision was eventually made to scuttle her. At 5.42 pm on 24 December 1987, she was sunk in deep water off Macquarie Island. To continue supporting the expedition program the Australian Antarctic Division chartered the Canadian vessel Lady Franklin, an ice-strengthened cargo vessel, for the remainder of the summer season.
