= Thala Dan =

Ice strengthened ship

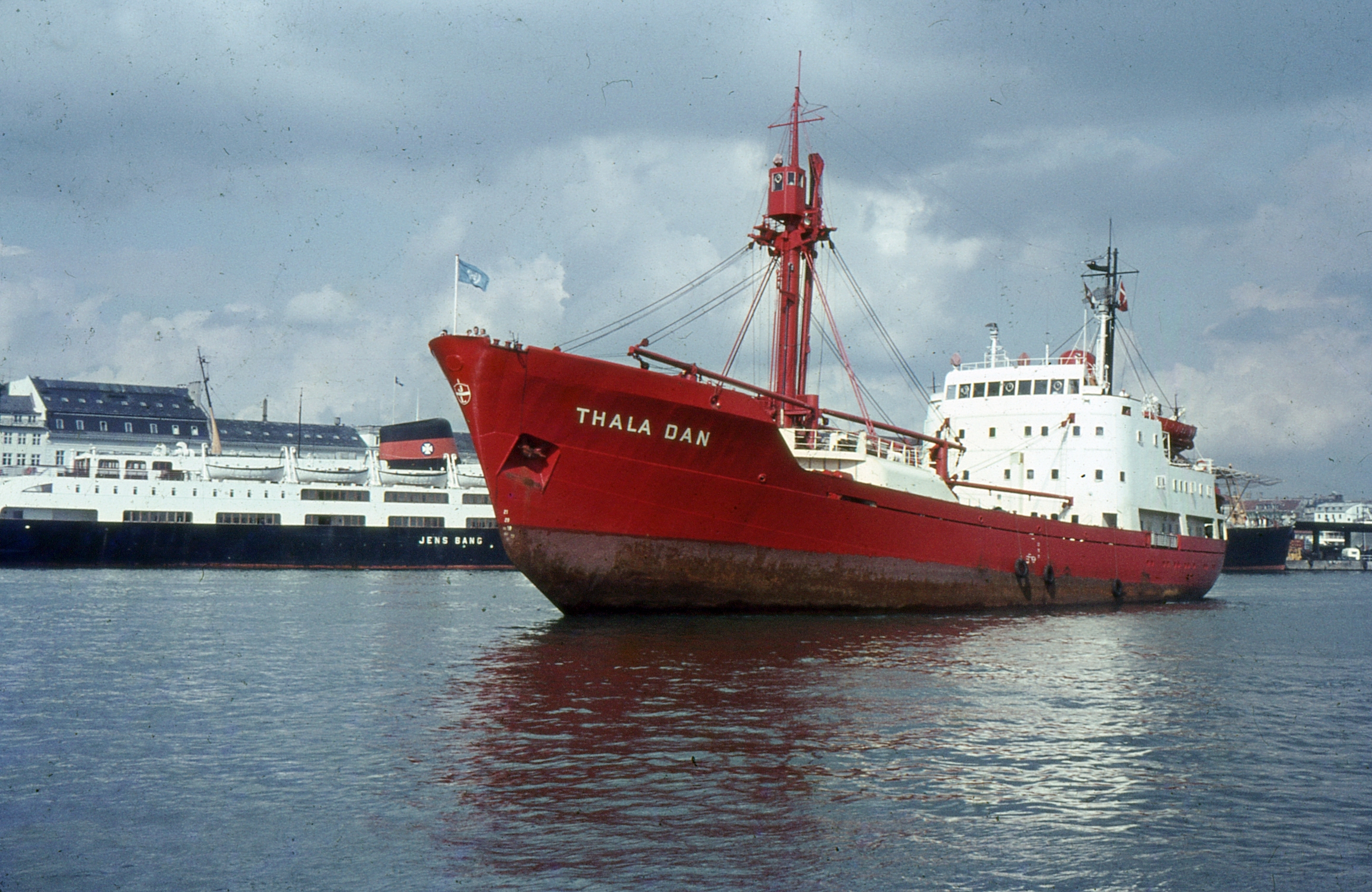
- Thala Dan in Copenhagen, 1967

History

Denmark
- Name: Thala Dan
- Operator: J. Lauritzen A/S, Copenhagen
- Builder: Aalborg Vaerft
- Yard number: 101
- Launched: 8 May 1957
- Out of service: 1982 sold to Brazilian Navy
- Homeport: Esbjerg
- Identification: IMO number: 5357680

Brazil
- Name: Barão de Teffé
- Namesake: Antônio Luís von Hoonholtz (the Baron of Teffé)
- Commissioned: 28 September 1982
- Decommissioned: 23 July 2002
- Homeport: Rio de Janeiro
- Identification: pennant number: H-42
- Fate: Scrapped in 2007

General characteristics
- Type: ice-strengthened refrigerated passenger-cargo ship, later research ship and then lighthouse tender
- Tonnage: 2,000 GRT
- Displacement: 2,183 tons standard; 5,500 tons full load
- Length: 82.11 m (269 ft 5 in)
- Beam: 13.72 m (45 ft 0 in)
- Draught: 6.30 m (20 ft 8 in)
- Speed: 12.5 knots (23.2 km/h; 14.4 mph)
- Endurance: 60 days
- Crew: (from 1982) 84
- Aircraft carried: (from 1982) 2 Helibrás Esquilo (locally designated as UH-12/13)
- Aviation facilities: (1960s) helipad and (from 1982) hangar

MS Thala Dan, built in Aalborg in 1957, was an ice-strengthened refrigerated cargo-passenger ship. Operated by Danish J. Lauritzen A/S from 1957 to 1982, she was jointly chartered by the Australian National Antarctic Research Expeditions and the French Polar Expeditions to re-supply their respective Antarctic stations. Afterwards acquired by the Brazilian Navy and renamed Barão de Teffé, she was engaged in the emergent Brazilian Antarctic Programme from 1982 to 1994.

== Design and construction ==
Thala Dan was built as an ice-strengthened refrigerated passenger-cargo ship in 1957, one of a fleet of such vessels built in the 1950s by Lauritzen; others included Kista Dan, Magga Dan and Nella Dan. She was launched on 8 May 1957 by Aalborg Værft, at the time also owned by Lauritzen, for the Group's shipowning subsidiary Rederiet Ocean A/S and completed on 9 October that year. Later, Thala Dan was allocated IMO Number 5357680 as her permanent identity.

As built, Thala Dan was 75.1 m (246.4 ft) LOA and (65.5 m (214.9 ft) LBP, with a beam of 13.8 m (45.3 ft) and draught of 6.3 m (20.7 ft). She was propelled by a Burmeister & Wain diesel engine, made in Copenhagen, driving a single screw which could propel the ship at 12 knots (22 km/h). Up to 50 passengers could be carried, in 2- to 5-berth cabins.

== Lauritzen service ==
As with her predecessor Kista Dan, Thala Dan traded from Denmark to Greenland and Canada during the northern summer, and was chartered to the Australian Antarctic Division of the Department of the Environment and Energy in the southern summer of each year from the 1957 to 1982. Initially operating out of Melbourne, and later Hobart, Tasmania, the ship was used to re-supply the Australian bases at Macquarie Island, Mawson Station, Davis Station, Wilkes Station and Casey Station, for occasional visits to Heard Island, the Russian Mirny Station, the French Dumont d'Urville Station and other exploration. She was also chartered by the French Government to supply the Dumont d'Urville Station.

On 16 January 1959 Thala Dan struck an uncharted rock pinnacle, now known as Thala Rock, in the Antarctic when approaching the Australian Davis Station, piercing the hull and a fuel tank. It took more than two weeks to stop the leak and extricate the ship from the rock, before she could continue to Davis Station. There she was temporarily repaired to enable her to return to Australia.

In 1975 she had a major refit at Aalborg, during which her accommodation was increased by one deck.

In commemoration of their contribution to Australia's Antarctic programme, Thala Dan and two other Lauritzen ships (Kista Dan and Nella Dan) were featured on an Australian Antarctic Territory postage stamp in 2003.

== Brazil ==
In 1982 Thala Dan was acquired by the Brazilian Navy to be adapted and take part in newly organised Operation Antarctica (OPERANTAR 1) of the Brazilian Antarctic Program (PROANTAR), and was its first ice-capable vessel. Commissioned on 28 September 1982 as an oceanographic support ship (NApOc) H-42, she was renamed Barão de Teffé in honor of Admiral Antônio Luiz von Hoonholtz (1837–1931), founder and first director of the navy's hydrographic service. In her initial years she operated in conjunction with the oceanographic vessel Professor W. Besnard of the Institute of Oceanography of the University of São Paulo.

Between 1984 and 1986 Barão de Teffé was engaged in the supply and construction of the permanent Comandante Ferraz Antarctic Station on King George Island in the South Shetland Islands and thereafter on a wide range of research projects in the region. In 1994, the ship was recommissioned as a lighthouse vessel (NF) supporting major construction projects on Trindade Island and the coast of São Paulo.

Barão de Teffé was decommissioned from naval service on 23 July 2002. After failed Australian attempts to purchase her for conversion to a museum ship, she was scrapped in Rio de Janeiro in October 2007.

Thala Dan

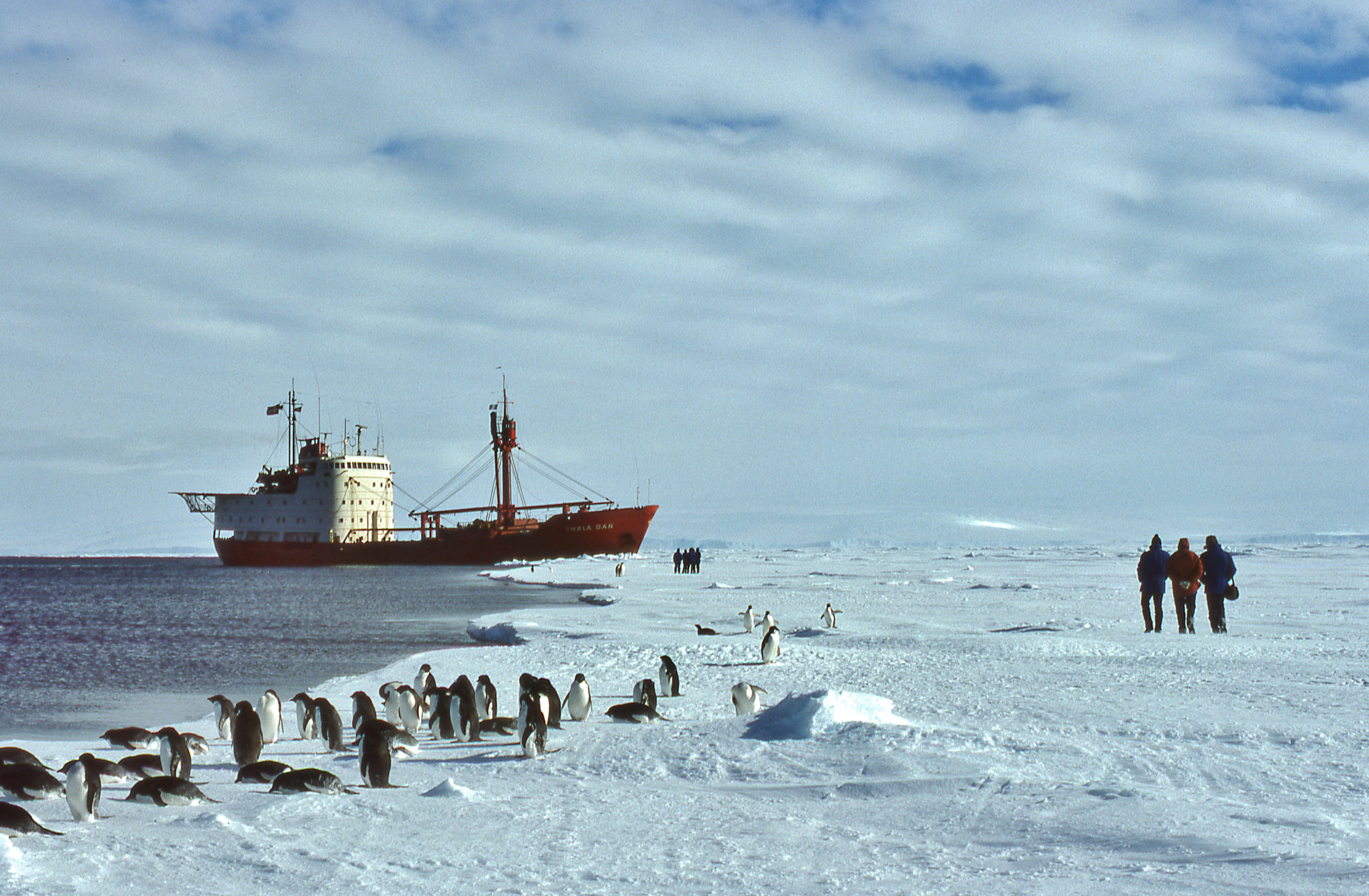
Early summer pack ice off Adélie Land (Antarctica)

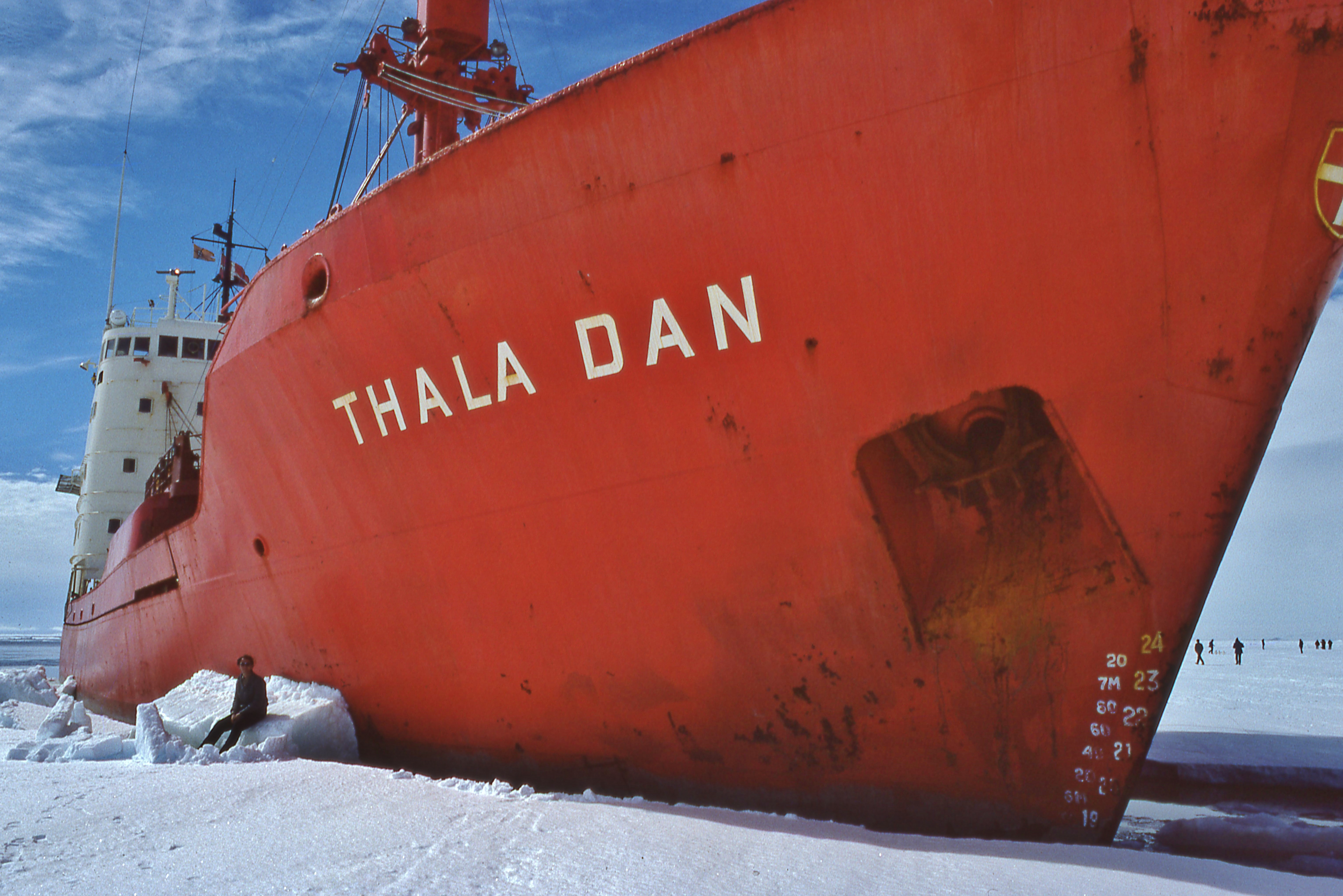
Stopped by pack ice in Adélie Land, December 1976

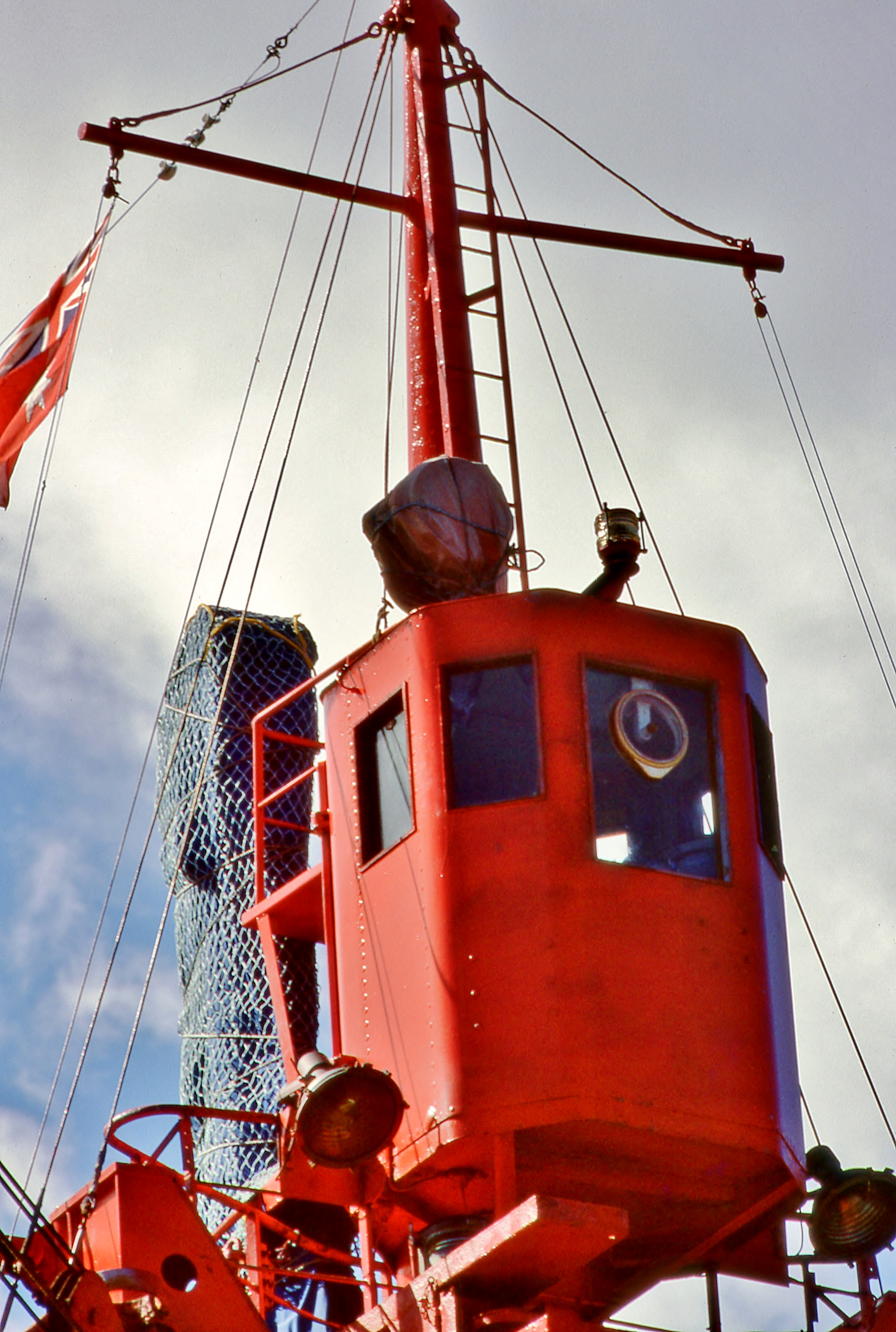
Crow's nest on the foremast of Thala Dan

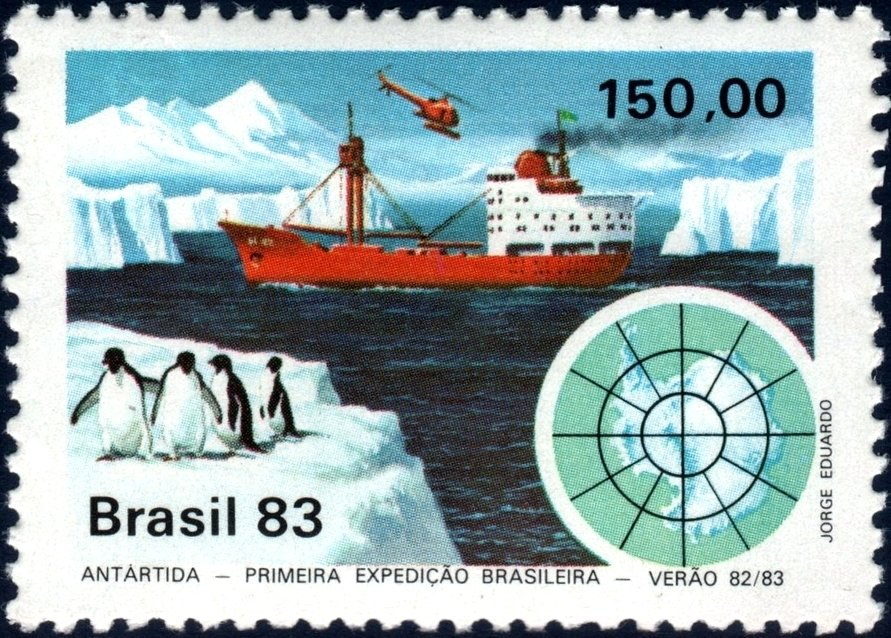
Under Brazilian flag displayed on a stamp
