= Sakazuki Rock =

Sakazuki Rock (68°42′S 40°31′E) is a small and featureless rock which lies just east of the Tama Point rock outcrop on the coast of Queen Maud Land. Mapped from surveys and air photos by the Japanese Antarctic Research Expedition (JARE), 1957–62. The name "Sakazuki-iwa" (wine cup rock) was applied by JARE Headquarters in 1962.
