= Manjū Rock =

- Location within Antarctica

Geography
- Location: Queen Maud Land, East Antarctica

Manjū Rock (68°45′S 40°25′E) is an exposed rock lying midway between Tama Glacier and Tama Point on the coast of Queen Maud Land, Antarctica. It was mapped from surveys and air photos by the Japanese Antarctic Research Expedition, 1957–62, and named Manjū-iwa (bun-shaped rock).
