= Tottsuki Point =

Headland in Antarctica

Tottsuki Point (68°55′S 39°50′E) is a small rock point lying 3 nautical miles (6 km) southwest of Flattunga on the coast of Queen Maud Land. Mapped by Norwegian cartographers from air photos taken by the Lars Christensen Expedition, 1936–37. Surveyed by Japanese Antarctic Research Expedition (JARE), 1957–62, and named Tottsuki-misaki (first point).
