= Flattunga =

Ice tongue in Antarctica

Coordinates: 68°51′S 40°00′E

Flattunga is a small ice tongue protruding into the sea between Tottsuki Point and Tensoku Rock, at the western end of the Prince Olav Coast in Queen Maud Land, Antarctica. It was mapped by Norwegian cartographers from air photos taken by the Lars Christensen Expedition, 1936–37, and named Flattunga (the flat tongue).

Flattunga separates Prince Olav Coast in the northeast from Sôya Coast (Sôya Kaigan) in the south.
