= Tensoku Rock =

Coastal rock in Queen Maud Land, Antarctica

Tensoku Rock (68°48′S 40°11′E) is an exposed rock lying on the coast, midway between Flattunga and Tama Glacier in Queen Maud Land. Mapped from surveys and air photos by Japanese Antarctic Research Expedition (JARE), 1957–62, and named Tensoku-iwa (observation rock) because the feature served as a point of observation for the JARE survey party.
