= Tama Point =

Point in Antarctica

Tama Point (68°43′S 40°26′E) is a point 3 nautical miles (6 km) northeast of Tama Glacier on the coast of Queen Maud Land. Mapped from surveys and air photos by Japanese Antarctic Research Expedition (JARE), 1957–62, and named Tama-misaki (ball point).
