= Tama Glacier =

Glacier in Antarctica

- Location of Queen Maud Land in Antarctica

- Location within Antarctica
- Location: Queen Maud Land
- Coordinates: 68°47′S 40°22′E
- Thickness: unknown
- Status: unknown

Tama Glacier (68°47′S 40°22′E) is a glacier flowing to the sea between Tensoku Rock and Manju Rock on the coast of Queen Maud Land. Mapped from surveys and air photos by Japanese Antarctic Research Expedition (JARE), 1957–62, and named Tama-hyoga (ball glacier).

== See also ==
- List of glaciers in the Antarctic
- Glaciology
