= List of mountains of Queen Maud Land =

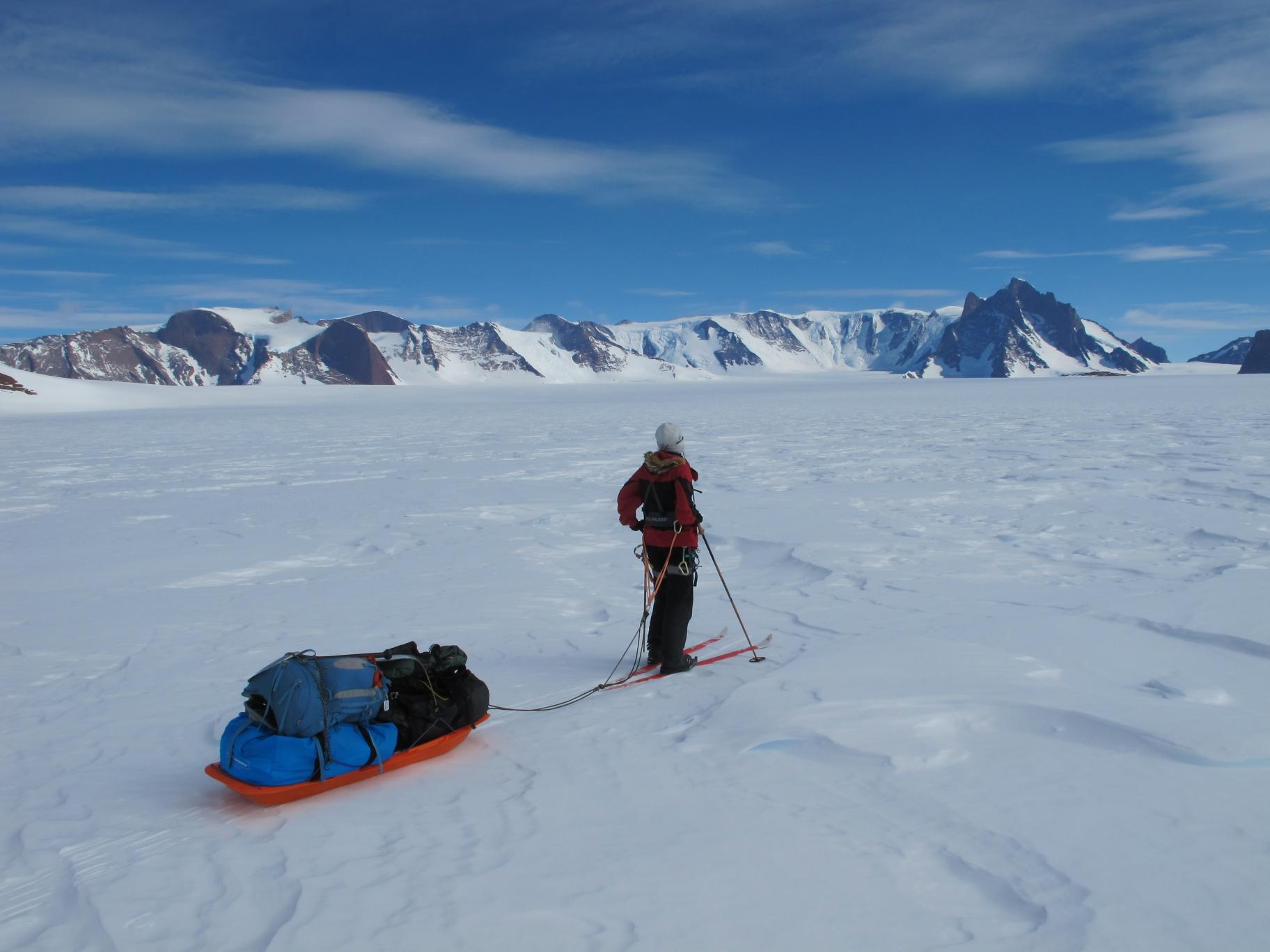
Jøkulkyrkja Mountain seen from the east. The summit is behind what seems like the highest peak to the right.

This list of mountains of Queen Maud Land contains mountains with a registered elevation of higher than 2000 metres (6561 feet) above sea level. The availability of accurate data for this region is limited, making the list both incomplete and inaccurate. Prominence data is generally not available, and the list includes rock formations such as mountain peaks, ridges, nunataks, cliffs and crags. Ice domes are not included in the list.

With an elevation of 3,148 metres (10,328 ft)s, Jøkulkyrkja Mountain is the highest mountain of Queen Maud Land. According to the United States Geological Survey (USGS) database Geographic Names Information System (GNIS) and other sources, several summits in the Sør Rondane Mountains are registered with higher elevation, including Isachsen Mountain (3,425 metres), Devold Peak (3,280 meters), Kjelbotn Peak (3,210 meters), Bond Peaks (3,180 meters) and Mount Widerøe (3,180 meters). According to Belgian sources and Norwegian topographic maps, the highest elevation of Sør Rondane Mountains is just below 3000 m.a.s.l.

Name	Elevation (meters)	Range	Coordinates	GNIS ID	SCAR ID
Devold Peak	3280	Sør Rondane Mountains	72°22′S 27°03′E	3812	3595
Kjelbotn Peak	3210	Sør Rondane Mountains	72°20′S 26°50′E	8022	7598
Bond Peaks	3180	Sør Rondane Mountains	72°15′S 25°35′E	1629	1562
Jøkulkyrkja Mountain	3148	Mühlig-Hofmann Mountains	71°53′S 06°42′E	7624	7207
Kyrkjeskipet Peak	3083	Mühlig-Hofmann Mountains	71°52′S 06°46′E	8325	7972
Sandeggtind Peak	3053	Conrad Mountains	71°51′S 09°45′E	13239	12696
Gessner Peak	3020	Mühlig-Hofmann Mountains	71°46′S 06°54′E	5629	5283
Mount Widerøe	2994	Sør Rondane Mountains	72°09′S 23°14′E	16564	16012
Kubus Mountain	2985	Filchner Mountains	71°58′S 07°20′E	8269	7882
Gløymdehorten Nunatak	2980	Hoel Mountains	72°07′S 12°12′E	5759	5410
Komsa Mountain	2960	Sør Rondane Mountains	72°08′S 25°19′E	8129	7726
Salen Mountain	2950	Sør Rondane Mountains	72°08′S 25°28′E	13175	12619
Zwiesel Mountain	2947	Wohlthat Mountains	71°43′S 12°07′E	16979	16545
Habermehl Peak	2945	Mühlig-Hofmann Mountains	71°49′S 06°54′E	6185	5834
Ulvetanna Peak	2931	Drygalski Mountains	71°51′S 08°20′E	15762	15176
Gneiskopf Peak	2930	Südliche Petermann Range	71°56′S 12°05′E	5766	5423
Håhellerskarvet	2910	Mühlig-Hofmann Mountains	71°57′S 06°10′E	6211	5862
Klevekåpa Mountain	2910	Filchner Mountains	72°01′S 07°37′E	8045	7625
Klevetind Peak	2910	Filchner Mountains	71°59′S 07°37′E	8046	7626
Mount Neustruyev	2900	Südliche Petermann Range	71°51′18″S 12°14′00″E	10632	10194
Taborovskiy Peak	2895	Humboldt Mountains	71°48′06″S 11°35′30″E	14956	14371
Hamartind Peak	2885	Sverdrup Mountains	72°33′S 00°39′E	6270	5922
Skeidsnutane Peaks	2885	Humboldt Mountains	71°53′S 11°35′E	13939	13396
Granitnaya Mountain	2880	Wohlthat Mountains	72°07′30″S 11°37′30″E	5947	5598
Håhelleregga Ridge	2875	Mühlig-Hofmann Mountains	71°53′S 06°00′E	6209	5860
Dufek Mountain	2873	Sør Rondane Mountains	72°13′S 24°42′E	4142	3932
Mount Walnum	2870	Sør Rondane Mountains	72°04′30″S 24°06′00″E	16237	15701
Skarsholen	2860	Humboldt Mountains	71°47′S 11°30′E		13380
Arden	2850	Sør Rondane Mountains	72°15′S 24°55′E		475
Mount Nikolayev	2850	Südliche Petermann Range	71°43′48″S 12°26′30″E	10713	10270
Mount Bjerke	2840	Conrad Mountains	71°58′S 09°42′E	1432	1384
Larsen Cliffs	2835	Mühlig-Hofmann Mountains	71°56′S 06°55′E	8529	8146
Smolenskaya Mountain	2835	Südliche Petermann Range	71°52′06″S 12°21′30″E	14098	13550
Isingen Mountain	2830	Sverdrup Mountains	72°23′S 01°06′E	7381	6961
Mount Skarshovden	2830	Humboldt Mountains	71°47′S 11°37′E	13924	13381
Graben Horn	2830	Wohlthat Mountains	71°48′S 12°02′E	5912	5562
Balchen Mountain	2820	Sør Rondane Mountains	72°02′S 27°30′E	885	806
Mount Mirotvortsev	2815	Südliche Petermann Range	71°50′18″S 12°18′00″E	10058	9650
Mount Khmyznikov	2805	Humboldt Mountains	71°51′54″S 11°39′30″E	7910	7499
Ritscher Peak	2791	Gruber Mountains	71°25′S 13°19′E	12687	12185
Rogers Peaks	2788	Sør Rondane Mountains	72°18′00″S 24°23′30″E	12818	12291
Hålisstonga Peak	2780	Kurze Mountains	72°02′S 08°56′E	6243	5896
Klevekampen Mountain	2780	Filchner Mountains	71°57′S 07°40′E	8044	7624
Snønutane Peaks	2780	Mühlig-Hofmann Mountains	72°06′S 04°50′E	14124	13580
Kvithø Peak	2775	Sverdrup Mountains	72°29′S 01°14′E	8309	7954
Sloknuten Peak	2765	Mühlig-Hofmann Mountains	72°02′S 04°52′E	14028	13491
Mount Hochlin	2760	Mühlig-Hofmann Mountains	72°05′S 04°03′E	6839	6447
Skruvestikka Nunatak	2760	Payer Mountains	72°11′30″S 14°28′00″E	13985	13444
Botnfjellet Mountain	2750	Humboldt Mountains	71°45′S 11°25′E	1720	1646
Isachsen Mountain	2750	Sør Rondane Mountains	72°16′S 26°30′E	7366	6939
Klumpen	2750	Sør Rondane Mountains	72°08′00″S 25°08′30″E		7641
Majoren	2750	Sør Rondane Mountains	72°16′48″S 26°31′30″E		8884
Mefjell Mountain	2750	Sør Rondane Mountains	72°05′S 25°00′E	9798	9380
Viking Heights	2750	Sør Rondane Mountains	72°04′S 23°10′E	16062	15511
Setenuten Peak	2745	Mühlig-Hofmann Mountains	72°03′S 04°45′E	13598	13049
Svartnupen Peak	2745	Kurze Mountains	71°55′S 08°54′E	14886	14292
Altartavla	2742	Humboldt Mountains	71°40′S 11°29′E		271
Puppa	2740	Sør Rondane Mountains	72°11′42″S 25°00′00″E		11710
Rakebosten Ridge	2737	Filchner Mountains	71°56′S 07°12′E	12315	11837
Trollslottet Mountain	2737	Filchner Mountains	71°56′S 07°12′E	15573	14986
Langfloget Cliff	2730	Mühlig-Hofmann Mountains	72°07′S 04°25′E	8459	8459
Skeidshovden Mountain	2730	Wohlthat Mountains	72°08′12″S 11°31′00″E	13936	13393
Mount Valikhanov	2730	Südliche Petermann Range	71°49′12″S 12°15′00″E	15848	15281
Luncke Range	2727	Sør Rondane Mountains	72°02′30″S 24°36′00″E	9138	8725
Breplogen Mountain	2725	Mühlig-Hofmann Mountains	71°54′S 05°27′E	1910	1833
Mount Flånuten	2725	Humboldt Mountains	71°46′S 11°15′E	4993	4680
Kinntanna Peak	2725	Drygalski Mountains	71°53′S 08°22′E	7980	7544
Skeidshornet Peak	2725	Wohlthat Mountains	71°51′S 12°00′E	13935	13392
Vørterkaka Nunatak	2725	Sør Rondane Mountains	72°28′30″S 27°58′00″E	16136	15590
Roots Heights	2722	Sverdrup Mountains	72°35′S 00°26′E	12885	12350
Bogbrerinden	2720	Sør Rondane Mountains	72°16′18″S 25°25′30″E		1517
Pervomayskaya Peak	2720	Humboldt Mountains	71°46′42″S 11°40′30″E	11646	11140
Høgsaetet Mountain	2717	Borg Massif	72°35′S 03°24′W	6871	6481
Mount Solov'yev	2715	Westliche Petermann Range	71°41′30″S 12°20′00″E	14180	13647
Paalnibba	2711	Heimefront Range	74°45′42″S 11°36′30″W		10803
Tambovskaya Peak	2709	Westliche Petermann Range	71°40′30″S 12°20′30″E	14981	14412
Shatskiy Hill	2705	Weyprecht Mountains	72°02′S 13°23′E	13669	13106
Risemedet Mountain	2704	Gjelsvik Mountains	72°03′S 03°10′E	12676	12174
Winsnesfjellet	2702	Sør Rondane Mountains	72°06′00″S 25°42′30″E		5448
Aurdalsegga Ridge	2700	Südliche Petermann Range	71°44′S 12°23′E	718	631
Hovdeknattane Rocks	2700	Wohlthat Mountains	72°07′S 11°38′E	7075	6662
Mount Grytøyr	2695	Mühlig-Hofmann Mountains	72°00′S 04°30′E	6104	5745
Skanseryggen	2694	Sør Rondane Mountains	72°11′06″S 25°10′30″E		13373
Mount Bolle	2685	Mühlig-Hofmann Mountains	71°54′S 06°50′E	1607	1545
Skorvetangen Spur	2680	Mühlig-Hofmann Mountains	72°03′S 05°20′E	13976	13440
Petrellfjellet	2678	Mühlig-Hofmann Mountains	71°59′S 04°39′E	11686	11185
Terningen Peak	2678	Gjelsvik Mountains	72°11′S 02°45′E	15129	14547
Glopenesranen Nunatak	2675	Conrad Mountains	72°08′S 10°00′E	5753	5400
Heikampen Peak	2675	Sverdrup Mountains	72°28′S 00°40′E	6572	6187
Klakemulen	2675	Sør Rondane Mountains	72°06′30″S 26°00′00″E		1644
Kvalfinnen Ridge	2670	Sør Rondane Mountains	72°12′30″S 26°37′00″E	8296	7935
Rivenæsnuten	2670	Sivorgfjella	74°51′S 11°22′W		12192
Trollryggen	2670	Sør Rondane Mountains	72°40′48″S 27°00′00″E		14985
Steinfila Nunatak	2665	Payer Mountains	72°12′S 14°22′E	14539	13986
Tussenobba Peak	2665	Mühlig-Hofmann Mountains	72°00′S 06°16′E	15684	15100
Portnipa Peak	2664	Gjelsvik Mountains	72°14′S 02°23′E	11970	11495
Sandhø Heights	2664	Conrad Mountains	71°51′S 09°48′E	13247	12706
Von Essen Mountain	2664	Gjelsvik Mountains	72°16′S 02°23′E	16124	15580
Mount Nils Larsen	2663	Sør Rondane Mountains	72°15′S 22°46′E	10729	10274
Mellomfjellet	2660	Sør Rondane Mountains	72°13′42″S 25°51′00″E		9407
Poulssonhamaren	2660	Heimefront Range	74°47′48″S 11°29′00″W		11529
Breskilkampen	2656	Sør Rondane Mountains	72°14′00″S 25°59′30″E		1834
Hålisrimen Peak	2655	Kurze Mountains	72°00′S 08°46′E	6242	5895
Mount Krüger	2655	Sverdrup Mountains	72°36′S 00°56′E	8255	7862
Holtanna Peak	2650	Drygalski Mountains	71°54′S 08°22′E	6923	6538
Mjellbresåtene	2650	Sør Rondane Mountains	72°20′00″S 26°00′30″E		4579
Remplingen Peak	2650	Mühlig-Hofmann Mountains	72°05′S 04°17′E	12516	12033
Snøskalkhausen Peak	2650	Weyprecht Mountains	72°02′S 13°12′E	14127	13583
Imingfjellet	2645	Sør Rondane Mountains	72°17′30″S 26°07′00″E		12508
Dekefjellet Mountain	2640	Weyprecht Mountains	71°58′S 13°25′E	3685	3486
Egil Peak	2640	Sverdrup Mountains	72°24′S 01°17′E	4356	4110
Gjeruldsenhøgda	2640	Orvin Mountains	71°59′S 10°49′E		5357
Høgesyn	2640	Sør Rondane Mountains	72°05′S 24°58′E		6470
Kamskaya Peak	2640	Weyprecht Mountains	71°57′30″S 13°26′00″E	7745	7340
Kazanskaya Mountain	2640	Weyprecht Mountains	71°59′S 13°16′E	7799	7403
Malysh Mountain	2640	Wohlthat Mountains	72°09′S 11°24′E	9329	8916
Snøskalkegga Ridge	2640	Weyprecht Mountains	71°59′S 13°15′E	14126	13582
Vavilov Hill	2640	Weyprecht Mountains	72°02′12″S 13°13′00″E	15913	15351
Slettefjellet	2638	Mühlig-Hofmann Mountains	71°45′S 06°53′E	14019	13482
Mount Bergersen	2636	Sør Rondane Mountains	72°04′S 25°55′E	1264	1217
Linnormegget Hill	2635	Payer Mountains	72°08′S 14°27′E	8871	8483
Mount Deryugin	2635	Humboldt Mountains	71°51′S 11°20′E	3766	3557
Ryghnuten	2630	Sivorgfjella	74°50′18″S 11°26′00″W		12555
Birgerhøgda	2625	Sør Rondane Mountains	72°04′48″S 25°53′30″E		7909
Oppkuven Peak	2625	Sverdrup Mountains	72°36′S 00°25′E	11125	10657
Ladfjella	2620	Kirwan Escarpment	74°06′S 07°45′W		7995
Müller Crest	2620	Payer Mountains	72°11′S 08°07′E	10377	9951
Ormeryggen	2620	Kirwan Escarpment	72°04′S 14°32′E	11154	10682
Keipen	2610	Payer Mountains	72°19′00″S 25°48′30″E		7416
Langbogfjellet	2610	Sør Rondane Mountains	72°13′12″S 25°41′30″E		8085
Skavlhø Mountain	2610	Sør Rondane Mountains	72°01′48″S 14°29′30″E	13929	13387
Raudberget	2606	Borg Massif	72°38′S 03°30′W	12373	11896
Halsknappane Hills	2600	Wohlthat Mountains	72°04′S 06°02′E	6262	5915
Malmrusta	2600	Mühlig-Hofmann Mountains	74°43′54″S 11°26′00″W		8900
Mount Skeidskneet	2600	Sivorgfjella	71°53′S 11°57′E	13938	13395
Spiret Peak	2594	Borg Massif	72°31′S 03°38′W	14387	13834
Bjørnnutane	2590	XU-fjella	74°37′S 10°00′W		1388
Gårenevslottet	2590	Payer Mountains	71°59′S 14°40′E		5134
Mount Victor	2590	Belgica Mountains	72°36′S 31°16′E	16027	15487
Sørsteinen	2580	Fimbulheimen	72°21′S 15°58′E		13702
Høgfonna Mountain	2579	Borg Massif	72°45′S 03°33′W	6865	6472
Médåsen	2575	Humboldt Mountains	71°51′S 11°49′E		9364
Mount Van Mieghem	2572	Belgica Mountains	72°36′S 31°14′E	15883	15304
Høgskolten	2565	Orvin Mountains	72°24′06″S 27°53′00″E		6490
Mørkenatten Peak	2565	Sør Rondane Mountains	71°51′S 10°34′E	10256	9848
Høgskavlnasen Point	2564	Borg Massif	72°42′S 03°44′W	6874	6484
Mount Solvay	2564	Belgica Mountains	72°34′S 31°23′E	14185	13652
Kvithamaren Cliff	2560	Mühlig-Hofmann Mountains	71°59′S 05°03′E	8307	7953
Mount Ramenskiy	2560	Südliche Petermann Range	71°46′S 12°33′E	12332	11855
Sarkofagen Mountain	2560	Mühlig-Hofmann Mountains	72°10′30″S 16°45′00″E	13301	12744
Zhil'naya Mountain	2560	Südliche Petermann Range	71°40′S 12°38′E	16943	16490
Storknolten Peak	2555	Filchner Mountains	72°11′S 08°03′E	14649	14091
Dungane Peaks	2550	Payer Mountains	72°13′12″S 23°57′00″E	4169	3962
Chervov Peak	2550	Shcherbakov Range	71°50′S 10°33′E	2715	2598
Ormehausen Peak	2550	Sør Rondane Mountains	72°01′S 14°37′E	11153	10681
Brattingen	2546	Sør Rondane Mountains	72°16′48″S 25°54′00″E		1779
Domen Butte	2545	Borg Massif	72°43′S 03°50′W	3963	3753
Isdalsegga Ridge	2540	Südliche Petermann Range	71°43′S 12°34′E	737	6949
Pinegin Peak	2540	Südliche Petermann Range	71°44′06″S 12°33′30″E	11787	11282
Mount Severtsev	2540	Südliche Petermann Range	71°43′S 12°37′E	13605	13055
Høgryggen	2535	Sør Rondane Mountains	72°12′30″S 23°46′30″E		6480
Festninga Mountain	2535	Mühlig-Hofmann Mountains	72°07′S 03°42′E	4858	4555
Mount Ruhnke	2535	Mühlig-Hofmann Mountains	72°05′S 03°38′E	13018	12471
Mount Boë	2534	Belgica Mountains	72°35′S 31°19′E	1582	1514
Mjøllføykje Bluff	2534	Kirwan Escarpment	73°32′S 03°45′W	10102	9699
Mount Van der Essen	2531	Belgica Mountains	72°35′S 31°23′E	15867	15296
Vendehø Heights	2529	Sverdrup Mountains	72°18′S 01°27′E	15940	15376
Niels Peak	2525	Gagarin Mountains	71°58′S 09°22′E	10708	10256
Mount Kolodkin	2525	Südliche Petermann Range	71°45′00″S 12°37′30″E	8122	7711
Krasheninnikov Peak	2525	Südliche Petermann Range	71°41′00″S 12°40′30″E	8200	7808
Mount Zuckerhut	2525	Gruber Mountains	71°25′S 13°26′E	13964	16532
Pilarryggen	2523	Borg Massif	72°43′S 03°56′W	11765	11257
Sanengenrusta	2520	Sivorgfjella	74°42′S 11°21′W		12721
Sørfløya	2520	Kirwan Escarpment	74°11′00″S 06°26′30″W		13684
Mount Yesenin	2520	Payer Mountains	72°03′S 14°26′E	16878	16370
Gavlen Ridge	2519	Sverdrup Mountains	72°38′S 00°26′E	5537	5183
Bakveggen	2515	Sør Rondane Mountains	72°20′54″S 25°48′30″E		798
Glitrenosa	2515	Sør Rondane Mountains	72°02′S 25°46′E		5393
Terletskiy Peak	2515	Orvin Mountains	71°49′24″S 10°31′30″E	15121	14538
Røysane Rocks	2513	Sør Rondane Mountains	72°21′18″S 22°57′30″E	12988	12438
Mount Rossel	2512	Belgica Mountains	72°36′S 31°02′E	12921	12387
Brattfjellet	2510	Sør Rondane Mountains	72°27′12″S 27°59′00″E		1775
Mount Dzhalil'	2510	Payer Mountains	72°01′48″S 14°35′30″E	4232	4011
Festefjell	2508	Sør Rondane Mountains	72°08′36″S 25°41′00″E		4552
Deromfjellet	2501	Sør Rondane Mountains	72°04′00″S 24°17′30″E		546
Mount Kibal'chich	2500	Payer Mountains	71°56′36″S 14°19′00″E	7914	7502
Gårekneet Ridge	2495	Payer Mountains	72°04′S 14°48′E	5488	5131
Tjuvholene Crags	2495	Mühlig-Hofmann Mountains	71°57′S 04°27′E	15341	14754
Mount Fukushima	2494	Queen Fabiola Mountains	71°21′S 35°37′E	5376	5013
Mount Collard	2492	Belgica Mountains	72°38′S 31°07′E	2964	2839
Mount Hoge	2491	Belgica Mountains	72°35′S 31°25′E	6863	6471
Store Svarthorn Peak	2488	Mittlere Petermann Range	71°36′S 12°33′E	14644	14079
Mount Dallmann	2485	Orvin Mountains	71°45′S 10°20′E	3469	3276
Mount Lahaye	2484	Belgica Mountains	72°36′S 31°10′E	8389	8018
Enden Point	2483	Kirwan Escarpment	73°37′S 04°13′W	4512	4250
Ristelen Spur	2480	Mühlig-Hofmann Mountains	71°58′S 05°36′E	12680	12179
Smalryggen	2480	Sør Rondane Mountains	72°25′24″S 27°34′30″E		13510
Mount Launoit	2478	Belgica Mountains	72°34′S 31°27′E	8585	8187
Mount Gillet	2475	Belgica Mountains	72°34′S 31°23′E	5682	5325
Nergaard Peak	2475	Gagarin Mountains	72°00′S 09°25′E	10607	10168
Skappelnabben Spur	2475	Kirwan Escarpment	73°43′S 04°33′W	13919	13374
Horten Peak	2471	Gjelsvik Mountains	72°04′S 03°11′E	7035	6630
Mount Brouwer	2466	Belgica Mountains	72°35′S 31°26′E	2003	1905
Høgekletten	2465	Sør Rondane Mountains	72°27′24″S 20°46′00″E		6469
Sistefjell Mountain	2465	Kirwan Escarpment	73°23′S 00°44′W	13894	13343
Mount Bastei	2460	Gruber Mountains	71°20′S 13°30′E	1060	985
Urna	2460	Fimbulheimen	72°14′S 16°46′E		15220
Mundlauga Crags	2455	Drygalski Mountains	71°57′S 08°24′E	10394	9966
Mount Gaston de Gerlache	2450	Queen Fabiola Mountains	71°44′S 35°49′E	5511	5154
Nupskåpa Peak	2450	Sverdrup Mountains	72°43′S 00°15′E	10932	10450
Mount Imbert	2449	Belgica Mountains	72°34′S 31°28′E	7269	6864
Gandrimen	2435	Sør Rondane Mountains	72°26′S 19°19′E		5102
Ryvingen Peak	2433	Borg Massif	72°55′S 03°30′W	13111	12570
Kvaevenutane Peaks	2430	Payer Mountains	71°57′S 14°19′E	8295	7932
Urfjellgavlen	2430	Kirwan Escarpment	74°06′S 05°43′W		15215
Vyatskaya Peak	2430	Weyprecht Mountains	71°57′30″S 13°32′30″E	16157	15616
Mount Bastin	2429	Belgica Mountains	72°32′S 31°15′E	1063	987
Mount Loodts	2429	Belgica Mountains	72°32′S 31°11′E	9016	8629
Mount Paulus	2428	Belgica Mountains	72°37′S 31°00′E	11460	10974
Mount Kerckhove de Denterghem	2427	Belgica Mountains	72°37′S 31°08′E	7878	7471
Urnosa Spur	2427	Kirwan Escarpment	73°47′S 05°02′W	15803	15221
Kallen	2425	Sør Rondane Mountains	72°17′00″S 26°15′30″E		7319
Odde Nunatak	2425	Orvin Mountains	72°02′S 10°42′E	11001	10540
Sløret Rocks	2425	Kirwan Escarpment	73°42′30″S 04°17′00″W	14032	13497
Fasettfjellet	2423	Regula Range	72°32′S 02°59′W	4790	4479
Kampesteinen	2420	Sør Rondane Mountains	72°19′06″S 26°40′30″E		1101
Mount Schicht	2420	Gruber Mountains	71°25′S 13°07′E	13367	12813
Urfjellklakken	2420	Kirwan Escarpment	74°03′S 05°37′W		15217
Ovbratten Peak	2419	Borg Massif	72°47′S 03°44′W	11229	10769
Huldreslottet Mountain	2416	Borg Massif	72°58′S 03°48′W	7145	6737
Hoggestabben Butte	2410	Mühlig-Hofmann Mountains	72°01′S 03°57′E	6867	6476
Skoltryggen	2410	Sør Rondane Mountains	72°24′24″S 27°58′00″E		13431
Mount Perov	2402	Belgica Mountains	72°34′S 31°12′E	11629	11126
Caussinknappen	2401	Sør Rondane Mountains	72°19′54″S 23°13′30″E		2426
Goolsnuten	2401	Sør Rondane Mountains	72°18′S 23°15′E		5494
Neumayer Cliffs	2401	Kirwan Escarpment	73°13′S 01°10′W	10624	10187
Astor Rocks	2400	Wohlthat Mountains	71°48′S 12°44′E	669	578
Loppa	2395	Sør Rondane Mountains	72°32′54″S 20°00′00″E		8641
Mount Borchgrevink	2390	Sør Rondane Mountains	72°07′S 22°51′E	1660	1601
Mount Derom	2390	Queen Fabiola Mountains	71°34′S 35°38′E	3762	3554
Saether Crags	2390	Kurze Mountains	71°52′S 08°54′E	13148	12594
Bergekongen	2385	Sør Rondane Mountains	72°20′00″S 19°17′30″E		1213
Kuvungen Hill	2385	Kirwan Escarpment	73°50′S 05°10′W	8292	7926
Mount Verhaegen	2383	Belgica Mountains	72°34′S 31°08′E	15970	15402
Dillenberget	2378	Sør Rondane Mountains	72°17′12″S 23°16′00″E		3646
Drøvelen	2375	Sør Rondane Mountains	72°22′12″S 27°35′00″E		3885
Brattnipane Peaks	2370	Sør Rondane Mountains	71°53′S 24°32′E	1848	1780
Høgsenga Crags	2370	Mühlig-Hofmann Mountains	71°53′S 05°23′E	6872	6482
Mount Brounov	2370	Payer Mountains	71°58′S 14°20′E	2001	1904
Jutulsessen Mountain	2370	Gjelsvik Mountains	72°01′S 02°45′E	7713	7289
Høgfonnhornet Peak	2366	Borg Massif	72°46′S 03°36′W	6866	6474
Tôtyaku-iwa	2366	Queen Fabiola Mountains	71°47′S 36°11′E		14851
Rakekniven Peak	2365	Filchner Mountains	71°54′S 07°17′E	12316	11838
Skeidsberget Hill	2365	Wohlthat Mountains	72°06′18″S 11°24′30″E	13934	13391
Mechnikov Peak	2365	Humboldt Mountains	71°37′30″S 11°39′00″E	9778	9362
Melleby Peak	2363	Kirwan Escarpment	73°16′S 01°15′W	9831	9405
Gandfluga	2362	Sør Rondane Mountains	72°20′54″S 19°23′00″E		5101
Nipehovden	2361	Sør Rondane Mountains	71°54′36″S 24°38′00″E		14489
Vesëlaya Mountain	2360	Wohlthat Mountains	71°38′30″S 12°32′00″E	15983	15424
Båsbolken Spur	2358	Mühlig-Hofmann Mountains	71°55′S 05°18′E	1048	971
Vesalkletten	2358	Sør Rondane Mountains	72°29′12″S 20°45′30″E		15421
Mount Lorette	2355	Belgica Mountains	72°32′S 31°09′E	9036	8647
Ufsekammen Ridge	2355	Gruber Mountains	71°25′S 13°13′E	15744	15160
Mount Limburg Stirum	2351	Belgica Mountains	72°34′S 31°19′E	8829	8452
Skoddemedet Peak	2350	Borg Massif	72°50′S 03°52′W	13966	13428
Storsåta	2350	Mittlere Petermann Range	71°28′S 12°26′E		14102
Hesteskoen Nunatak	2350	Sør Rondane Mountains	71°52′30″S 27°35′00″E	6740	6330
Motoi Iwa	2341	Queen Fabiola Mountains	71°47′S 36°12′E		9905
Høgskavlpiggen Peak	2340	Borg Massif	72°39′S 03°45′W	6876	6486
Mount Hallgren	2337	Kirwan Escarpment	73°23′S 03°22′W	6251	5911
Cumulus Mountain	2333	Mühlig-Hofmann Mountains	71°51′S 05°22′E	3410	3202
Swaabsteinen	2332	Sør Rondane Mountains	72°19′S 23°15′E		14312
Sinicintoppen	2330	Wohlthat Mountains	71°29′36″S 12°56′30″E		13319
Tindegga Ridge	2327	Regula Range	72°32′S 02°55′W	15322	14731
Mount Maere	2325	Belgica Mountains	72°32′S 31°17′E	9269	8844
Mount Zimmermann	2324	Gruber Mountains	71°21′S 13°19′E	16951	16508
Mount Andreyev	2320	Orvin Mountains	71°45′S 10°15′E	444	389
Vorrnipa Peak	2320	Kirwan Escarpment	73°07′30″S 01°50′00″W	16132	15587
Kuven Hill	2310	Kirwan Escarpment	73°52′S 05°15′W	8290	7923
Lidkvarvet	2310	Sivorgfjella	74°39′18″S 10°38′00″W		8425
Sumnerkammen	2310	Tottanfjella	74°55′30″S 11°55′00″W		14236
Mount Fučík	2305	Payer Mountains	71°53′S 14°27′E	5366	5003
Kvasstind Peak	2304	Borg Massif	72°31′S 03°23′W	8303	7945
Ormesporden Hill	2300	Payer Mountains	72°05′S 14°18′E	11155	10683
Tanna Peak	2300	Sverdrup Mountains	72°20′S 01°19′E	14989	14423
Worsfoldfjellet	2300	Tottanfjella	75°06′30″S 12°51′00″W		16222
Høgfonnaksla Ridge	2295	Borg Massif	72°44′S 03°34′W	6864	6473
Mount Sphinx	2294	Belgica Mountains	72°21′S 31°15′E	14356	13819
Tonynuten	2287	Sør Rondane Mountains	72°23′S 20°12′E		14806
Vedkosten Peak	2287	Mühlig-Hofmann Mountains	72°02′S 03°58′E	15919	15358
Prince de Ligne Mountains	2285	Belgica Mountains	72°20′S 31°14′E	12092	11612
Mount Razumovskiy	2285	Östliche Petermann Range	71°29′30″S 12°43′00″E	12403	11922
Kuwagata Yama	2282	Queen Fabiola Mountains	72°04′S 35°14′E		7927
Høgskavlnebbet Spur	2280	Borg Massif	72°38′S 03°39′W	6875	6485
Skarsnuten Peak	2280	Sverdrup Mountains	72°32′S 00°22′E	13926	13383
Stornupen Peak	2274	Gjelsvik Mountains	72°10′S 02°22′E	14658	14098
Mount Eyskens	2273	Queen Fabiola Mountains	71°32′S 35°36′E	4713	4425
Kvervelnatten Peak	2273	Kirwan Escarpment	73°31′S 03°53′W	8305	7949
Sistenup Peak	2270	Kirwan Escarpment	73°17′30″S 00°44′00″W	13895	13344
Stenka Mountain	2270	Payer Mountains	71°56′06″S 14°45′00″E	14562	14003
Kvaevefjellet Mountain	2265	Payer Mountains	71°53′S 14°27′E	8294	7931
Smalegga Spur	2265	Orvin Mountains	71°54′30″S 10°38′00″E	14050	13506
Mount Goossens	2263	Queen Fabiola Mountains	71°19′S 35°44′E	5839	5498
Johnsonhogna	2260	Tottanfjella	74°57′S 12°30′W		7179
Mathisenskaget	2260	Sivorgfjella	74°51′54″S 11°35′30″W		9140
Okskaya Nunatak	2260	Weyprecht Mountains	71°58′30″S 13°48′00″E	11036	10575
Sisterabben Hill	2260	Kirwan Escarpment	73°21′S 00°44′W	13896	13345
Deildegasten Ridge	2257	Östliche Petermann Range	71°29′S 12°42′E	3682	3483
Torimai Dake	2256	Queen Fabiola Mountains	71°20′18″S 35°44′00″E		14828
Gruvletindane Crags	2254	Kurze Mountains	71°44′S 09°02′E	6103	5743
Isfossnipa Peak	2253	Kirwan Escarpment	73°09′S 01°30′W	7376	6955
Gårenevkalven Nunatak	2250	Payer Mountains	72°01′S 14°47′E	5489	5133
Svartbandufsa Bluff	2248	Kirwan Escarpment	73°29′S 03°48′W	14856	14280
Gara-dake	2247	Belgica Mountains	72°33′S 31°18′E		5112
Nålegga Ridge	2245	Borg Massif	72°39′S 04°04′W	10470	10056
Vedskålen Ridge	2243	Mühlig-Hofmann Mountains	72°03′S 03°56′E	15920	15359
Fingeren Peak	2240	Borg Massif	72°38′S 03°46′W	4915	4611
Flisegga	2240	Tottanfjella	75°02′S 12°28′W		4740
Bautaen Peak	2240	Sør Rondane Mountains	72°00′30″S 26°04′00″E	1089	1014
Jaren Crags	2237	Mühlig-Hofmann Mountains	71°46′S 06°45′E	7486	7076
Iskollen Hill	2235	Borg Massif	72°51′S 04°10′W	7386	6965
Bergtussen	2232	Sør Rondane Mountains	72°19′54″S 19°29′00″E		1222
Svarthornkammen Ridge	2230	Mittlere Petermann Range	71°32′S 12°20′E	14862	14289
Menipa Peak	2228	Sør Rondane Mountains	71°56′30″S 25°05′00″E	9859	9436
Vendeholten Mountain	2227	Sverdrup Mountains	72°12′S 01°20′E	15941	15377
Isbrynet Hill	2225		73°08′30″S 04°28′00″W	7370	6946
Uversnatten Rock	2225	Borg Massif	72°57′30″S 03°53′00″W	15832	15260
Norumnuten	2224	Sivorgfjella	74°44′30″S 11°40′30″W		10410
Eckhörner Peaks	2223	Humboldt Mountains	71°31′S 11°30′E	4288	4057
Taka-iwa	2221	Queen Fabiola Mountains	71°45′S 35°53′E		14391
Hauglandkleppen	2220	XU-fjella	74°38′S 10°13′W		6098
Krasnov Rocks	2220	Orvin Mountains	71°49′00″S 10°20′30″E	8206	7813
Vorrtind Peak	2220	Kirwan Escarpment	73°05′30″S 01°34′00″W	16133	15588
Bulken Hill	2220	Sør Rondane Mountains	71°52′S 27°14′E	2124	2027
Mount Kurchatov	2220	Humboldt Mountains	71°39′S 11°14′E	8280	7912
Kurakake Yama	2218	Queen Fabiola Mountains	72°00′S 35°13′E		7910
Devoldkalven	2215	Sør Rondane Mountains	72°21′00″S 27°04′30″E		3596
Haugen	2215	Fimbulheimen	72°08′S 17°11′E		6097
Mana Mountain	2215	Borg Massif	72°51′S 03°23′W	9335	8921
Simensen Peak	2215	Sør Rondane Mountains	71°56′S 25°33′E	13835	13281
Mount Van Pelt	2213	Queen Fabiola Mountains	71°15′S 35°43′E	15886	15305
Mount Pierre	2213	Queen Fabiola Mountains	71°18′S 35°45′E	11755	11250
Søyla Peak	2210	Borg Massif	72°41′30″S 03°50′00″W	14305	13763
Austkampane Hills	2210	Sør Rondane Mountains	71°48′S 25°15′E	749	666
Eremitten Nunatak	2205	Sør Rondane Mountains	72°15′30″S 27°38′00″E	4566	4308
Nurket Rock	2205	Kirwan Escarpment	73°24′30″S 03°07′00″W	10936	10453
The Altar	2200	Humboldt Mountains	71°39′S 11°20′E	330	272
Gluvrekletten Peak	2200	Gjelsvik Mountains	72°12′S 02°32′E	5764	5419
Kampekalven Mountain	2200	Filchner Mountains	71°56′S 07°46′E	7743	7337
Sandneshatten	2200	Conrad Mountains	71°42′S 09°40′E		12711
Kvithovden Peak	2197	Sverdrup Mountains	72°22′S 00°46′E	8310	7956
Gråhorna Peaks	2196	Westliche Petermann Range	71°36′S 12°11′E	5927	5574
Penck Ledge	2196	Borg Massif	73°03′30″S 04°18′00″W	11545	11051
Tverrnipa Peak	2196	Sverdrup Mountains	72°15′S 01°18′E	15696	15110
Svarthamaren Mountain	2195	Mühlig-Hofmann Mountains	71°55′S 05°10′E	14857	14281
Wrighthamaren	2190	Sivorgfjella	74°36′06″S 11°01′30″W		16243
Bamse Mountain	2188	Sør Rondane Mountains	72°16′00″S 21°54′30″E	927	851
Bråpiggen Peak	2185	Borg Massif	72°54′S 03°18′W	1842	1766
Langekletten	2179	Sør Rondane Mountains	72°24′18″S 20°55′30″E		8090
Sponskaftet Spur	2175	Humboldt Mountains	71°39′S 11°13′E	14411	13856
Isidati Yama	2171	Belgica Mountains	72°36′30″S 31°14′30″E		6959
Cottontoppen	2170	Tottanfjella	75°03′S 12°41′W		3028
Juckeskammen	2170	Tottanfjella	74°59′S 12°22′W		7248
Fjomet Nunatak	2165	Kirwan Escarpment	73°25′S 02°55′W	4977	4662
Vorrkulten Mountain	2165	Kirwan Escarpment	73°04′12″S 01°54′30″W	16131	15586
Schivestolen	2159	Milorgfjella	74°20′S 09°44′W		12824
Sørhausane Peaks	2155	Sverdrup Mountains	72°47′S 00°15′E	14213	13687
Splinten Peak	2145	Borg Massif	72°41′S 04°00′W	14404	13848
Maquetknausane	2144	Sør Rondane Mountains	72°17′00″S 22°38′30″E		8967
Van Autenboerfjellet	2142	Sør Rondane Mountains	72°21′00″S 20°15′30″E		15293
Lyrittaren	2140	Östliche Petermann Range	71°25′S 12°40′E		8760
Fløymannen Nunatak	2137	Kirwan Escarpment	73°09′S 02°14′W	5065	4754
Veslenupen Peak	2137	Gjelsvik Mountains	72°07′S 02°14′E	15987	15430
Anders Peak	2136	Kurze Mountains	71°46′S 09°01′E	417	345
Glashaugen Hill	2130	Sør Rondane Mountains	72°18′S 27°52′E	5733	5371
Gramkroken	2130	Sivorgfjella	74°37′30″S 10°41′30″W		5577
Kjellberg Peak	2130	Borg Massif	72°55′30″S 03°46′00″W	8024	7600
Mount Vanderheyden	2129	Belgica Mountains	72°30′S 31°20′E	15869	15315
Storehø	2125	Sør Rondane Mountains	71°56′24″S 25°14′30″E		14083
Veten Mountain	2123	Borg Massif	72°37′30″S 03°50′00″W	16018	15462
Røysa	2120	Fimbulheimen	72°05′S 17°08′E		12437
Skolteskjeret	2120	Sør Rondane Mountains	72°22′24″S 28°01′30″E		13430
Stig Nunatak	2119	Kirwan Escarpment	73°20′S 03°14′W	14605	14040
Hiku-iwa	2114	Queen Fabiola Mountains	71°47′S 35°49′E		6379
Gavlpiggen Peak	2110	Kirwan Escarpment	73°58′30″S 05°48′00″W	5538	5184
Sagbladet Ridge	2105	Mühlig-Hofmann Mountains	71°47′S 05°50′E	13154	12599
Smirnov Peak	2105	Orvin Mountains	71°44′54″S 10°38′00″E	14064	13522
Brattskarvet Mountain	2103	Sverdrup Mountains	72°06′30″S 01°24′30″E	1852	1782
Mount Hulshagen	2094	Belgica Mountains	72°31′S 31°16′E	7150	6742
Alveberget	2090	Sør Rondane Mountains	72°16′06″S 18°22′00″E		278
Mount DeBreuck	2089	Queen Fabiola Mountains	71°16′S 35°40′E	3638	3448
Alan Peak	2086	Sverdrup Mountains	72°39′S 00°10′E	175	162
Hae-no-iwa	2086	Queen Fabiola Mountains	71°26′S 35°42′E		5846
Skigarden Ridge	2086	Mühlig-Hofmann Mountains	71°54′S 04°34′E	13952	13409
Mount Roer	2083	Sverdrup Mountains	72°18′S 00°20′E	12811	12284
Klakknabben Peak	2080	Kirwan Escarpment	73°57′S 05°47′W	8036	7615
Loze Mountain	2080	Humboldt Mountains	71°37′S 11°15′E	9099	8193
Framskotet Spur	2075	Borg Massif	72°30′30″S 03°42′00″W	5232	4904
Kubbestolen Peak	2070	Kurze Mountains	71°47′S 08°54′E	8264	7879
Strømnæsberget	2070	XU-fjella	74°31′48″S 09°23′00″W		14154
Strandrud Mountain	2070	Sør Rondane Mountains	71°53′S 25°39′E	14671	14115
Ahlstad Hills	2065	Mühlig-Hofmann Mountains	71°50′S 05°32′E	145	126
Berckmanskampen	2063	Sør Rondane Mountains	71°58′54″S 25°07′30″E		1201
Blaiklockfjellet	2061	Sør Rondane Mountains	72°01′S 24°07′E		2581
Drabanten Nunatak	2060	Kirwan Escarpment	73°54′S 05°55′W	4059	3848
Austhamaren Peak	2060	Sør Rondane Mountains	71°44′S 26°51′E	739	656
Gyôten Dake	2056	Queen Fabiola Mountains	71°17′12″S 35°42′00″E		5829
Gneysovaya Peak	2050	Westliche Petermann Range	71°32′36″S 12°11′00″E	5771	5429
Mount Deildenapen	2040	Östliche Petermann Range	71°25′S 12°47′E	3683	3484
Friis-Baastad Peak	2040	Borg Massif	72°53′S 03°18′W	5324	4969
Risen Peak	2040	Gjelsvik Mountains	71°58′S 03°18′E	12677	12175
Salknappen Peak	2040	Sverdrup Mountains	72°19′S 01°03′E	13186	12633
Vysotskiy Peak	2035	Humboldt Mountains	71°35′S 11°40′E	16158	15619
Ytstenut Peak	2034	Regula Range	72°30′S 02°50′W	16900	16394
Hatten Peak	2033	Borg Massif	72°39′S 04°10′W	6477	6092
Lauringrabben	2033	Milorgfjella	74°19′54″S 09°34′00″W		8191
Sandnesstaven Peak	2031	Conrad Mountains	71°42′S 09°37′E	13252	12713
Sørhjelmen Peak	2030	Sør Rondane Mountains	71°47′30″S 26°37′00″E	14214	13688
Ardusberget	2020	Tottanfjella	75°05′S 12°51′W		479
Jutulhogget Peak	2020	Gjelsvik Mountains	72°01′S 02°50′E	7710	7286
Mount Mentzel	2015	Gruber Mountains	71°22′S 13°40′E	9861	9437
Ekesteinen Rock	2005	Fimbulheimen	71°46′S 10°47′E	4385	4139
Tanngarden Peaks	2005	Sør Rondane Mountains	72°02′30″S 23°00′00″E	14992	14424
Madsensåta	2004	Östliche Petermann Range	71°21′S 12°36′E		8842
Svindlandfjellet	2002	Sør Rondane Mountains	72°05′S 23°48′E		14308
Gubben	2000	Humboldt Mountains	71°49′30″S 11°17′00″E		18089
Verheyefjellet	2000	Sør Rondane Mountains	72°09′30″S 23°45′00″E		15404
