= Tysk Pass =

Mountain pass in Antarctica

Tysk Pass (72°43′S 3°47′W) is a mountain pass between Hogskavlen Mountain and Domen Butte in the Borg Massif, Queen Maud Land. The feature was first photographed from the air by the German Antarctic Expedition (1938–39). It was mapped by Norwegian cartographers from surveys and air photos by Norwegian-British-Swedish Antarctic Expedition (NBSAE) (1949–52) and named Tyskepasset (the German pass), presumedly because it was seen earlier by the German expedition.
