= Migmatitovaya Rock =

Rock formation in Queen Maud land, Antarctica

Migmatitovaya Rock (71°47′S 10°38′E) is a rock at the eastern end of a spur, lying 3 nautical miles (6 km) northeast of Terletskiy Peak in the Shcherbakov Range of the Orvin Mountains, Queen Maud Land, Antarctica. It was roughly plotted from air photos by the Third German Antarctic Expedition, 1938–39, and was mapped from air photos and surveys by the Sixth Norwegian Antarctic Expedition, 1956–60. The feature was remapped by the Soviet Antarctic Expedition, 1960–61, and named "Skala Migmatitovaya" (migmatite rock).
