= Sjøbotnen Cirque =

Cirque in Antarctica

Sjøbotnen Cirque (71°22′S 13°25′E) is the prominent cirque in the north face of the main massif of the Gruber Mountains, situated immediately east of Mount Zimmermann, in the Wohlthat Mountains of Queen Maud Land. It was discovered and plotted from air photos by the German Antarctic Expedition of 1938–39, and replotted from air photos and surveys by the Norwegian Antarctic Expedition, 1956–60, and named Sjøbotnen ("the lake cirque") because the inner part of the feature is occupied by a sizable lake.
