= Svelget =

Cirque in Antarctica

Svelget (73°55′S 5°22′W) is a cirque between Tunga Spur and Uven Spur in the Kirwan Escarpment, Queen Maud Land. Mapped by Norwegian cartographers from surveys and air photos by Norwegian-British-Swedish Antarctic Expedition (NBSAE) (1949–52) and additional air photos (1958–59), and named Svelget (the throat).
