= Vorrkulten Mountain =

Mountain in Queen Maud Land, Antarctica

Vorrkulten Mountain (73°4′S 1°54′W) is a mountain at the north end of Vestvorren Ridge, just north of Neumayer Cliffs in Queen Maud Land. Photographed from the air by the German Antarctic Expedition (1938–39). Mapped by Norwegian cartographers from surveys and air photos by Norwegian-British-Swedish Antarctic Expedition (NBSAE) (1949–52) and by the Norwegian expedition (1958–59), it was named Vorrkulten (the jetty knoll).
