= Nurket Rock =

Nurket Rock (73°25′S 3°6′W) is a rock face just east of Mount Hallgren in the Kirwan Escarpment, Queen Maud Land. Mapped by Norwegian cartographers from surveys and air photos by Norwegian-British-Swedish Antarctic Expedition (NBSAE) (1949–52) and additional air photos (1958–59), and named Nurket (the pygmy).
