= Sistenup Peak =

Mountain in Queen Maud Land, Antarctica

Sistenup Peak (73°17′S 0°44′W) is a low peak at the northeast end of the Kirwan Escarpment, about 5 nautical miles (9 km) north of Sistefjell Mountain, in Queen Maud Land. Mapped by Norwegian cartographers from surveys and air photos by Norwegian-British-Swedish Antarctic Expedition (NBSAE) (1949–52) and air photos by the Norwegian exp (1958–59) and named Sistenup (last peak).
