= Ufsebrotet Bluff =

Ufsebrotet Bluff (71°23′S 13°17′E) is a steep bluff located 2 miles (3.2 km) south of Mount Zimmermann in the central Gruber Mountains of the Wohlthat Mountains, Queen Maud Land. Discovered and plotted from air photos by German Antarctic Expedition, 1938–39. Replotted from air photos and surveys by Norwegian Antarctic Expedition, 1956–60, and named Ufsebrotet.
