= Ekesteinen Rock =

Coordinates: 71°46′S 10°46′E

Ekesteinen Rock is an isolated rock 3.5 nautical miles (6 km) southeast of Smirnov Peak in the Shcherbakov Range, at the east end of the Orvin Mountains, Queen Maud Land. It was mapped from air photos and surveys by the Sixth Norwegian Antarctic Expedition, 1956–60, and named "Ekesteinen" (the spoke stone).
