= Kjellberg Peak =

Mountain in Queen Maud Land, Antarctica

Kjellberg Peak (72°56′S 3°45′W) is a small rock peak at the head of Frostlendet Valley, about 4 nautical miles (7 km) west of Ryvingen Peak, in the southern part of the Borg Massif of Queen Maud Land, Antarctica. It was mapped by Norwegian cartographers from surveys and air photos by the Norwegian–British–Swedish Antarctic Expedition (1949–52) and named for Sigvard Kjellberg, a photographer with the Norwegian air unit of the expedition.
