= Mount Valikhanov =

Mountain in Queen Maud Land, Antarctica

Mount Valikhanov (71°49′S 12°15′E) is a mountain (2,800 m) standing 1 nautical mile (1.9 km) northwest of Mount Mirotvortsev in Sudliche Petermann Range, Wohlthat Mountains. It was discovered and plotted from air photos by the German Antarctic Expedition, 1938–39. It was mapped from air photos and surveys by the Norwegian Antarctic Expedition, 1956–60, and was remapped by the Soviet Antarctic Expedition, 1960–61, and named after Russian geographer Chokan Valikhanov (1935–65).
