= Sørskeidet Valley =

Antarctic region first discovered in late 1930s

Sørskeidet Valley (72°3′S 11°30′E) is an ice-filled valley in Antarctica. Located north of Skeidshovden Mountain near the southwest end of the Wohlthat Mountains in Queen Maud Land, it was first photographed from the air by the German Antarctic Expedition of 1938–39. It was mapped by Norwegian cartographers from surveys and air photos by the Norwegian Antarctic Expedition (1956–60) and named Sørskeidet.
