= Bystrov Rock =

Bystrov Rock (71°47′S 12°35′E) is a prominent rock lying 1 nautical mile (2 km) south-southeast of Isdalsegga Ridge in the Südliche Petermann Range of the Wohlthat Mountains. It was mapped from air photos and surveys by the Sixth Norwegian Antarctic Expedition, 1956–60; remapped by the Soviet Antarctic Expedition, 1960–61, and named after Soviet paleontologist A.P. Bystrov.
