= Knut Rocks =

The Knut Rocks (71°24′S 13°2′E) are several small rock outcroppings on a north-facing slope, located 5 nautical miles (9 km) east of Deildegasten Ridge in the southwest part of the Gruber Mountains, Queen Maud Land, Antarctica. The rocks were initially discovered and plotted from air photos by the Third German Antarctic Expedition, 1938–39, and replotted from air photos and surveys by the Sixth Norwegian Antarctic Expedition, 1956–60. They were named for Knut Odegaard, a radio operator with the Norwegian expedition in 1958–59.
