= Rindehallet Slope =

Ice slope in Queen Maud Land, Antarctica

Rindehallet Slope (72°25′S 1°13′E) is an ice slope between Isingen Mountain and Egil Peak in the Sverdrup Mountains, Queen Maud Land. Photographed from the air by the German Antarctic Expedition (1938–39). Mapped by Norwegian cartographers from surveys and air photos by Norwegian-British-Swedish Antarctic Expedition (NBSAE) (1949–52) and air photos by the Norwegian expedition (1958–59) and named Rindehallet (the mountain slope).
