= Smolenskaya Mountain =

Mountain in Queen Maud Land, Antarctica

Smolenskaya Mountain (71°52′S 12°21′E) is a small mountain, 2,890 m, standing 2.5 nautical miles (4.6 km) east-southeast of Mount Neustruyev in Sudliche Petermann Range, Wohlthat Mountains. Discovered and plotted from air photos by German Antarctic Expedition, 1938–39. Mapped from air photos and surveys by Norwegian Antarctic Expedition, 1956–60; remapped by Soviet Antarctic Expedition, 1960–61, and named after the city of Smolensk.
