= Smalegga Spur =

Rock spur in Antarctica

Coordinates: 71°55′S 10°37′E

Smalegga Spur is a small rock spur 3 nautical miles (6 km) south-southeast of Morkenatten Peak, Shcherbakov Range, in the Orvin Mountains of Queen Maud Land. Mapped by Norway from air photos and surveys by Norwegian Antarctic Expedition, 1956–60, and named Smalegga (the narrow ridge).
