= Vorrnipa Peak =

Mountain in Queen Maud Land, Antarctica

Vorrnipa Peak (73°8′S 1°51′W) is a peak, 2,320 m, surmounting Neumayer Cliffs just south of Vestvorren Ridge in Queen Maud Land. Photographed from the air by the German Antarctic Expedition (1938–39). Mapped by Norwegian cartographers from surveys and air photos by Norwegian-British-Swedish Antarctic Expedition (NBSAE) (1949–52) and air photos by the Norwegian expedition (1958–59) and named Vorrnipa (the jetty peak).
