= Vorrtind Peak =

Mountain in Queen Maud Land, Antarctica

Vorrtind Peak (73°5′S 1°35′W) is a peak at the north end of Austvorren Ridge, just north of Neumayer Cliffs in Queen Maud Land. Photographed from the air by the German Antarctic Expedition (1938–39). Mapped by Norwegian cartographers from surveys and air photos by Norwegian-British-Swedish Antarctic Expedition (NBSAE) (1949–52) and air photos by the Norwegian expedition (1958–59) and named Vorrtind (the jetty peak).
