= Mount Severtsev =

Mountain in Queen Maud Land, Antarctica

Mount Severtsev (71°43′S 12°37′E) is a peak, 2,540 m, standing 2 nautical miles (3.7 km) northeast of Pinegin Peak in the Sudliche Petermann Range, Wohlthat Mountains. Discovered and plotted from air photos by German Antarctic Expedition, 1938–39. Mapped from air photos and surveys by Norwegian Antarctic Expedition, 1956–60; remapped by Soviet Antarctic Expedition, 1960–61, and named after Russian geographer N.A. Severtsev (1827–85).
