= Isfossnipa Peak =

Mountain in Queen Maud Land, Antarctica

Isfossnipa Peak (73°9′S 1°30′W) is a peak 2 miles (3 km) southeast of Austvorren Ridge, surmounting the eastern part of the Neumayer Cliffs in Queen Maud Land, Antarctica. It was photographed from the air by the Third German Antarctic Expedition (1938–39). It was mapped by Norwegian cartographers from surveys and air photos by the Norwegian–British–Swedish Antarctic Expedition (1949–1952), led by John Schjelderup Giæver, and from air photos by the Norwegian expedition (1958–59) and named "Isfossnipa" (the icefall peak).
