= Sisterabben Hill =

Sisterabben Hill (73°21′S 0°44′W) is a hill about 2 nautical miles (3.7 km) north of Sistefjell Mountain, at the northeast end of the Kirwan Escarpment in Queen Maud Land. Mapped by Norwegian cartographers from surveys and air photos by Norwegian-British-Swedish Antarctic Expedition (NBSAE) (1949–52) and air photos by the Norwegian expedition (1958–59) and named Sisterabben (the last hill).
