= Hovdeknattane Rocks =

The Hovdeknattane Rocks (72°7′S 11°39′E) are rocky crags projecting from the southwestern part of Hovdebrekka Slope, just north of Skeidshovden Mountain in the Wohlthat Mountains of Queen Maud Land, Antarctica. They were mapped by Norwegian cartographers from surveys and air photos by the Sixth Norwegian Antarctic Expedition (1956–60) and named Hovdeknattane (the knoll rocks).
