= Vestskotet Bluff =

Bluff in Queen Maud Land, Antarctica

Vestskotet Bluff (73°13′S 2°9′W) is a bluff just south of Armalsryggen, at the west end of Neumayer Cliffs in Queen Maud Land. It was photographed from the air by the German Antarctic Expedition (1938–39). It was mapped by Norwegian cartographer from surveys and air photos by Norwegian-British-Swedish Antarctic Expedition (NBSAE) (1949–52) and air photos by the Norwegian expedition (1958–59) and named Vestskotet, meaning "the west bulkhead."
