= Stig Nunatak =

Stig Nunatak (73°20′S 3°14′W) is a nunatak about 3 nautical miles (6 km) northeast of Mount Hallgren in the Kirwan Escarpment, Queen Maud Land. Mapped by Norwegian cartographers from surveys and air photos by Norwegian-British-Swedish Antarctic Expedition (NBSAE) (1949–52) and additional air photos (1958–59). Named for Stig E. Hallgren, photographer with NBSAE.
