= Kvervelnatten Peak =

Mountain in Queen Maud Land, Antarctica

Kvervelnatten Peak (73°31′S 3°53′W) is a peak 2 nautical miles (4 km) southwest of Svartbandufsa Bluff in the Kirwan Escarpment of Queen Maud Land, Antarctica. It was mapped and named by Norwegian cartographers from surveys and air photos by the Norwegian–British–Swedish Antarctic Expedition (1949–52) and additional air photos (1958–59).
