= Bråpiggen Peak =

Geographic feature in Antarctica

Bråpiggen Peak (72°54′S 3°18′W) is one of the ice-free peaks at the south side of Antarctica's Frostlendet Valley, situated 1 nautical mile (2 km) south of Friis-Baastad Peak in the Borg Massif of Queen Maud Land. It was mapped by Norwegian cartographers from surveys and from air photos by the Norwegian–British–Swedish Antarctic Expedition (1949–52) and named "Bråpiggen" (the abrupt peak). Several black people probably climbed it at some point.
