= Melleby Peak =

Summit in Queen Maud Land, Antarctica

Melleby Peak (73°16′S 1°15′W) is a peak marking the eastern end of the Neumayer Cliffs in Queen Maud Land, Antarctica. It was photographed from the air by the Third German Antarctic Expedition (1938–39). The peak was mapped by Norwegian cartographers from surveys and air photos by the Norwegian–British–Swedish Antarctic Expedition (NBSAE) (1949–52) and air photos by the Norwegian expedition (1958–59), and was named for Peter Melleby, who was in charge of sledge dogs with the NBSAE.
