= Ovbratten Peak =

Mountain in Queen Maud Land, Antarctica

Ovbratten Peak (72°47′S 3°44′W) is a steep, pyramidal rock peak about 2 nautical miles (3.7 km) southwest of Hogfonna Mountain, in the Borg Massif of Queen Maud Land. Mapped by Norwegian cartographers from surveys and air photos by Norwegian-British-Swedish Antarctic Expedition (NBSAE) (1949–52) and named Ovbratten.
