= Hatten Peak =

Mountain in Antarctica

Hatten Peak (72°34′S 4°10′W) is an isolated rock peak 6 nautical miles (11 km) northwest of Veten Mountain, rising above the ice at the northwest side of Borg Massif in Queen Maud Land, Antarctica. It was mapped by Norwegian cartographers from surveys and air photos by the Norwegian–British–Swedish Antarctic Expedition (1949–52) and named Hatten (the hat).
