= Høgskavlnebbet Spur =

Høgskavlnebbet Spur (72°38′S 3°39′W) is a spur extending north from Høgskavlen Mountain in the Borg Massif of Queen Maud Land, Antarctica. It was mapped by Norwegian cartographers from surveys and air photos by the Norwegian–British–Swedish Antarctic Expedition (1949–52) and named Høgskavlnebbet (the high snowdrift spur).
