= Rakebosten Ridge =

Rock ridge in Queen Maud Land, Antarctica

Rakebosten Ridge (71°56′S 7°12′E) is a high rock ridge with lateral western spurs, forming the south part of Trollslottet Mountain in the Filchner Mountains, Queen Maud Land. Plotted from surveys and air photos by the Norwegian Antarctic Expedition (1956–60) and named Rakebosten (the shave bristles).
