= Hånuten Peak =

Hånuten Peak (Norwegian for "Shark Peak") may refer to

- Shark Peak, a peak in the Framnes Mountains, Antarctica
- Hånuten (Betekhtin Range), a peak in the Humboldt Mountains (Antarctica)
