= Gneiskopf Peak =

Mountain in Antarctica

Gneiskopf Peak (71°56′S 12°7′E) is a peak 2,930 metres (9,600 ft) high rising 8 kilometres (5 mi) southwest of Mount Neustruyev at the southern end of the Südliche Petermann Range, in the Wohlthat Mountains of Queen Maud Land, Antarctica. It was discovered and given the descriptive name Gneiskopf (gneiss peak) by the Third German Antarctic Expedition (1938–1939), led by Captain Alfred Ritscher.

== See also ==
- List of mountains of Queen Maud Land
