= Malysh Mountain =

Mountain in Queen Maud Land, Antarctica

Coordinates: 72°9′S 11°24′E

Malysh Mountain is a small mountain, 2,640 metres (8,660 ft) high, standing southwest of Skeidshovden Mountain in the Wohlthat Mountains of Queen Maud Land, Antarctica. It was discovered and plotted from air photos by the Third German Antarctic Expedition, 1938–39, and was mapped from air photos and surveys by the Sixth Norwegian Antarctic Expedition, 1956–60. The mountain was remapped by the Soviet Antarctic Expedition, 1960–61, and named "Gora Malysh" (small child mountain).
