= Svarthornkammen Ridge =

Mountain in Antarctica

Svarthornkammen Ridge (71°31′S 12°31′E) is a high rock ridge extending north for 5 nautical miles (9 km) from Svarthorna Peaks in the Mittlere Petermann Range, Wohlthat Mountains. Discovered and plotted from air photos by German Antarctic Expedition, 1938–39. Replotted from air photos and surveys by Norwegian Antarctic Expedition, 1956–60, and named Svarthornkammen (the black peak ridge).
