= Kubusdalen =

Valley in Queen Maud Land, Antarctica

Kubusdalen (71°58′S 7°14′E) is an ice-filled valley between Trollslottet Mountain and Kubus Mountain in the Filchner Mountains of Queen Maud Land, Antarctica. It was plotted from surveys and air photos by the Sixth Norwegian Antarctic Expedition (1956–60) and named Kubusdalen (the cube valley) in association with Kubus Mountain.
