= Møteplassen Peak =

Mountain in Queen Maud Land, Antarctica

Møteplassen Peak (72°47′S 3°9′W) is the northernmost peak in the group bordering the south side of Frostlendet Valley, in the Borg Massif of Queen Maud Land, Antarctica. It was mapped by Norwegian cartographers from surveys and air photos by the Norwegian–British–Swedish Antarctic Expedition (1949–52) and named "Møteplassen" (the meeting place).
