= Mount Andreyev =

Mountain in Antarctica

- Location within Antarctica

Highest point
- Elevation: 2,320 m (7,610 ft)
- Coordinates: 71°46′S 10°13′E

Geography
- Location: Orvin Mountains, Queen Maud Land

Mount Andreyev is a mountain, 2,320 m, standing close southwest of Mount Dallmann where it forms part of the southwest wall of Brattebotnen Cirque, in the Orvin Mountains, Queen Maud Land. Probably first seen by the German Antarctic Expedition, 1938–39. Mapped from air photos and surveys by Norwegian Antarctic Expedition, 1956–60; remapped by Soviet Antarctic Expedition, 1960–61, and named after Soviet historical geographer A.I. Andreyev (1887—1959).
