= Breidskaret Pass =

Breidskaret Pass (72°44′S 3°24′W) is a mountain pass between Hogfonna Mountain and Jokulskarvet Ridge in the Borg Massif, Queen Maud Land. It was mapped by Norwegian cartographers from surveys and from air photos by the Norwegian–British–Swedish Antarctic Expedition (1949–52) and named Breidskaret (the "wide gap").
