= Mount Zuckerhut =

Mountain in Queen Maud Land, Antarctica

Mount Zuckerhut (71°25′S 13°27′E) is a peak (2,525 m) standing 3.2 km (2.0 mi) southeast of Ritscher Peak in the Gruber Mountains of Queen Maud Land. Discovered and given the descriptive name Zuckerhut (sugarloaf) by the Third German Antarctic Expedition (1938–1939), led by Capt. Alfred Ritscher.
