= Granitnaya Mountain =

Mountain in Antarctica

Granitnaya Mountain (72°8′S 11°38′E) is a mountain, 2,880 metres (9,450 ft) high, standing just east of Skeidshovden Mountain in the Wohlthat Mountains of Queen Maud Land, Antarctica. It was discovered and plotted from air photos by the Third German Antarctic Expedition, 1938–39, and mapped from air photos and surveys by the Sixth Norwegian Antarctic Expedition, 1956–60. It was remapped by the Soviet Antarctic Expedition, 1960–61, and named by them "Gora Granitnaya" (granite mountain).
