= Mana Mountain =

Mountain in Queen Maud Land, Antarctica

Mana Mountain (72°51′S 3°22′W) is a prominent ice-free mountain bordering the south side of Frostlendet Valley about 5 nautical miles (9 km) southwest of Møteplassen Peak, in the Borg Massif of Queen Maud Land, Antarctica. It was mapped and named by Norwegian cartographers from surveys and air photos by the Norwegian–British–Swedish Antarctic Expedition (1949–52).
