= Høgskavlnasen Point =

Headland in Antarctica

- Location within Antarctica

Highest point
- Coordinates: 72°42′S 3°45′W

Geography
- Location: Queen Maud Land, East Antarctica
- Parent range: Høgskavlen Mountain, Borg Massif

Høgskavlnasen Point is a point which forms the southern extremity of Høgskavlen Mountain in the Borg Massif of Queen Maud Land, Antarctica. It was mapped by Norwegian cartographers from surveys and air photos by the Norwegian–British–Swedish Antarctic Expedition (1949–52) and named Høgskavlnasen (the high snowdrift point).
