= Sløret Rocks =

Sloret Rocks (73°43′S 4°17′W) is a small group of rocks high along the ice slope of Kirwan Escarpment, about 5 nautical miles (9 km) south of Enden Point, in Queen Maud Land. Mapped by Norwegian cartographers from surveys and air photos by Norwegian-British-Swedish Antarctic Expedition (NBSAE) (1949–52) and named Sloret (the veil).
