= Uven Spur =

Small rock spur In Queen Maud Land, Antarctica

Uven Spur (73°56′S 5°20′W) is a small rock spur just southwest of Tunga Spur, extending from the Kirwan Escarpment in Queen Maud Land, Antarctica. It was mapped by Norwegian cartographers from surveys and air photos by Norwegian-British-Swedish Antarctic Expedition (NBSAE) (1949–52) and additional air photos (1958–59), and named Uven.
