= Slabotnen Cirque =

Cirque in Antarctica

Slabotnen Cirque (71°46′S 10°27′E) is a cirque formed between the east slopes of Mount Dallmann and the Shcherbakov Range, in the Orvin Mountains of Queen Maud Land. It was discovered and photographed by the German Antarctic Expedition, 1938–39. It was mapped by Norway from air photos and surveys by Norwegian Antarctic Expedition, 1956–60, and named Slabotnen (the sloping cirque).
