= Tindegga Ridge =

Tindegga Ridge (72°31′S 2°54′W) is a rock ridge immediately southwest of Ytstenut Peak, at the northeast end of the Borg Massif in Queen Maud Land. It was mapped by Norwegian cartographers from surveys and air photos by the Norwegian-British-Swedish Antarctic Expedition (NBSAE) (1949–52) and air photos by the Norwegian expedition (1958–59) and named Tindegga (the summit ridge).
