= Hovdebrekka Slope =

Ice slope in Queen Maud Land, Antarctica

Hovdebrekka Slope (72°3′S 11°48′E) is a crevassed ice slope several miles long which trends northeastward from Skeidshovden Mountain in the Wohlthat Mountains of Queen Maud Land, Antarctica. First photographed from the air by the Third German Antarctic Expedition (1938–39), it was mapped by Norwegian cartographers from surveys and air photos by the Sixth Norwegian Antarctic Expedition (1956–60) and named Hovdebrekka (the knoll slope).
