= Duken Flat =

Area in Antarctica

Duken Flat (73°48′S 5°10′W) is a small, flat, ice-covered area between Urnosa Spur and Framranten Point, near the southwest end of the Kirwan Escarpment in Queen Maud Land. It was mapped by Norwegian cartographers from surveys and air photos by the Norwegian–British–Swedish Antarctic Expedition (1949–52) and from additional air photos (1958–59), and named Duken by them.
