= Terningen Peak =

Mountain in Queen Maud Land, Antarctica

- Location within Antarctica

Highest point
- Elevation: 2,680 metres (8,790 ft)
- Coordinates: 72°11′S 2°45′E

Geography
- Location: Antarctica
- Parent range: Gjelsvik Mountains

Terningen Peak is a small rock peak marking the summit of Terningskarvet Mountain in the Gjelsvik Mountains, Queen Maud Land. It was photographed from the air by the Third German Antarctic Expedition (1938–1939), led by Capt. Alfred Ritscher. It was mapped by Norwegian cartographers from surveys and air photos by the Norwegian-British-Swedish Antarctic Expedition (NBSAE) (1949–1952), led by John Schjelderup Giæver, and later by air photos by the Norwegian expedition (1958–59) and named Terningen (the die).

== See also ==
- List of mountains of Queen Maud Land
