= Betekhtin =

Betekhtin may refer to

- Anatoly Betekhtin (1931–2012), Soviet military commander
- Betekhtin Range in Antarctica
