= Mount Kolodkin =

Mountain in Queen Maud Land, Antarctica

Coordinates: 71°45′S 12°37′E

Mount Kolodkin is a mountain, 2,525 metres (8,280 ft) high, standing 1.5 nautical miles (3 km) southeast of Pinegin Peak in the Südliche Petermann Range of the Wohlthat Mountains, Antarctica. It was discovered and plotted from air photos by the Third German Antarctic Expedition, 1938–39 and later mapped from air photos and surveys collected by the Sixth Norwegian Antarctic Expedition, 1956–60. The mountain was remapped by the Soviet Antarctic Expedition, 1960–61, and named after Kolodkin, designer of Fabian Gottlieb von Bellingshausen's ships the Vostok and Mirnyy.
