= Ryvingen =

Ryvingen may refer to:

- Ryvingen Lighthouse, a lighthouse located on an island off the coast of Mandal, Norway
- Ryvingen Peak, a rock peak in Queen Maud Land, Antarctica
