= Vavilov Hill =

Hill in Antarctica

Vavilov Hill (Russian: Гора Николай Вавилова, Gora Nikolai Vavilova; Norwegian: Vavilovskuten) (72°2′S 13°11′E) is a hill, 2,640 m (8661 ft) high, located in the Hoelfjella area of the Weyprecht Mountains in Queen Maud Land, Antarctica. It stands about 3 nautical miles (6 km) west of Shatskiy Hill. The hill was first roughly plotted from aerial photographs taken during the German Antarctic Expedition(1938–1939) led by Alfred Ritscher. Further mapping was carried out using air photos and surveys by the Norwegian Antarctic Expedition (1956–1960). The Soviet Antarctic Expedition remapped the hill during their 1960–1961 research trip and assigned the name in honor of Soviet botanist Nikolai Ivanovich Vavilov (1887–1943). The Advisory Committee on Antarctic Names adapted the Russian name into English in 1970.
