= Mjøllføykje Bluff =

Bluff in Antarctica

Mjøllføykje Bluff (73°32′S 3°45′W) is a prominent bluff at the east side of Belgen Valley, in the Kirwan Escarpment of Queen Maud Land, Antarctica. It was mapped by Norwegian cartographers from surveys and air photos by the Norwegian–British–Swedish Antarctic Expedition (1949–52) and from additional air photos of 1958–59.
