= Shatskiy Hill =

Hill in Antarctica

Shatskiy Hill (72°2′S 13°21′E) is a hill, 2,705 m, in the Dekefjellrantane Hills of the Weyprecht Mountains, Queen Maud Land. Discovered and plotted from air photos by the Third German Antarctic Expedition (1938–1939), led by Capt. Alfred Ritscher. Mapped from air photos and surveys by Norwegian Antarctic Expedition, 1956–60; remapped by Soviet Antarctic Expedition, 1960–61, and named after Soviet geologist, N.S. Shatskiy.

== See also ==
- List of mountains of Queen Maud Land
