= Skeidsberget Hill =

Hill of Queen Maud Land

Coordinates: 72°6′S 11°25′E

Skeidsberget Hill is a hill about 2 nautical miles (3.7 km) northwest of the summit of Skeidshovden Mountain in the Wohlthat Mountains of Queen Maud Land. First photographed from the air by the German Antarctic Expedition (1938–39). Mapped by Norwegian cartographers from surveys and air photos by the Norwegian Antarctic Expedition (1956–60) and named Skeidsberget.
