= Søyla Peak =

Mountain in Queen Maud Land, Antarctica

Soyla Peak (72°42′S 3°51′W) is a small peak just north of Domen Butte in the Borg Massif of Queen Maud Land. Mapped by Norwegian cartographers from surveys and air photos by Norwegian-British-Swedish Antarctic Expedition (NBSAE) (1949–52) and named Soyla (the pillar).
