= Terletskiy Peak =

Mountain in Queen Maud Land, Antarctica

Terletskiy Peak (71°49′S 10°31′E) is a peak, 2,505 m, rising 1.7 nautical miles (3.1 km) northwest of Chervov Peak in the Shcherbakov Range, Orvin Mountains, in Queen Maud Land. Discovered and roughly plotted from air photos by German Antarctic Expedition, 1938–39. Mapped from air photos and surveys by Norwegian Antarctic Expedition, 1956-60 remapped by Soviet Antarctic Expedition, 1960–61, and named after Soviet hydrographer N.A. Terletskiy (1910–1954).
