= Årmålsryggen =

Årmålsryggen (73°12′S 2°8′W) is a ridge at the west end of the Neumayer Cliffs in Queen Maud Land. It was photographed from the air by the Third German Antarctic Expedition (1938–39). It was mapped by Norwegian cartographers from surveys and air photos by the Norwegian–British–Swedish Antarctic Expedition (1949–52) and from air photos by the Norwegian expedition (1958–59) and named Årmålsryggen (the year's goal ridge).
