= Fingeren Peak =

Mountain in Antarctica

Fingeren Peak (72°38′S 3°47′W) is a peak immediately northwest of Hogskavlpiggen Peak, in the Borg Massif of Queen Maud Land, Antarctica. It was mapped by Norwegian cartographers from surveys and air photos by the Norwegian–British–Swedish Antarctic Expedition (1949–52) and named Fingeren (the finger).
