= Skoddemedet Peak =

Mountain in Queen Maud Land, Antarctica

Skoddemedet Peak (72°50′S 3°51′W) is a rock peak about 5 nautical miles (9 km) southwest of Hogfonna Mountain, in the Borg Massif of Queen Maud Land. Mapped by Norwegian cartographers from surveys and air photos by Norwegian-British-Swedish Antarctic Expedition (NBSAE) (1949–52) and named Skoddemedet (the fog landmark).
