= Friis-Baastad Peak =

Mountain in Antarctica

Friis-Baastad Peak (72°53′S 3°18′W) is one of the ice-free peaks at the south side of Frostlendet Valley, situated 1 nautical mile (2 km) southeast of the Mana Mountain in the Borg Massif of Queen Maud Land, Antarctica. It was mapped by Norwegian cartographers from surveys and air photos by Norwegian–British–Swedish Antarctic Expedition (NBSAE) (1949–52) and named for Captain Kare Friis-Baastad, a member of the Norwegian air unit with the NBSAE.
