= Kampekalven Mountain =

Mountain in Queen Maud Land, Antarctica

Kampekalven Mountain (71°56′S 7°46′E) is a mountain, 2,200 metres (7,200 ft) high, forming the northeast end of the Filchner Mountains in Queen Maud Land, Antarctica. It was photographed from the air by the Third German Antarctic Expedition (1938–39), was mapped from surveys and air photos by the Sixth Norwegian Antarctic Expedition (1956–60) and named Kampekalven (the crag calf).
