= Mørkenatten Peak =

Mountain in Queen Maud Land, Antarctica

Mørkenatten Peak (71°52′S 10°34′E) is a peak, 2,515 metres (8,250 ft) high, located 1 nautical mile (2 km) south of Chervov Peak in the Shcherbakov Range of the Orvin Mountains, in Queen Maud Land, Antarctica. It was mapped by Norway from air photos and surveys by the Sixth Norwegian Antarctic Expedition 1956–60, and named "Mørkenatten" (the dark night).
