= Snøskalkhausen Peak =

Mountain in Queen Maud Land, Antarctica

Snoskalkhausen Peak (72°2′S 13°12′E) is a peak 2,650 m, marking the southwest end of the Weyprecht Mountains in Queen Maud Land. Photographed from the air by the German Antarctic Expedition (1938–39). Mapped by Norwegian cartographers from surveys and air photos by the Norwegian Antarctic Expedition (1956–60) and named Snoskalkhausen.
