= Uversnatten Rock =

Coordinates: 72°58′S 3°54′W

Uversnatten Rock is a small rock eminence 1 nautical mile (1.9 km) west of Huldreslottet Mountain, at the south end of Borg Massif in Queen Maud Land, Antarctica. It was mapped by Norwegian cartographers from surveys and air photos by Norwegian-British-Swedish Antarctic Expedition (NBSAE) (1949–52) and named Uversnatten.
