= Veslenupen Peak =

Mountain in Queen Maud Land, Antarctica

Veslenupen Peak (72°7′S 2°13′E) is a peak near the north end of Nupskammen Ridge in the Gjelsvik Mountains, Queen Maud Land. It was photographed from the air by the German Antarctic Expedition (1938–39), and was mapped by Norwegian cartographers from surveys and air photos by the Norwegian-British-Swedish Antarctic Expedition (NBSAE) (1949–52) and air photos by the Norwegian expedition (1958–59). It was named Veslenupen, meaning "the little peak."
