= Dekefjellrantane Hills =

- Location within Antarctica

Highest point
- Peak: 2372
- Coordinates: 72°2′S 13°23′E

Geography
- Location: Queen Maud Land, East Antarctica
- Parent range: Weyprecht Mountains in Hoel Mountains

The Dekefjellrantane Hills are a group of rock hills at the southern end of the Weyprecht Mountains in Queen Maud Land. They were photographed from the air by the Third German Antarctic Expedition (1938–39). They were mapped by Norwegian cartographers from surveys and air photos by the Sixth Norwegian Antarctic Expedition (1956–60) and named Dekefjellrantane in association with nearby Dekefjellet Mountain.
