= Sistefjell Mountain =

Bluff-like mountain

Sistefjell Mountain (73°23′S 0°44′W) is a bluff-like mountain situated 10 nautical miles (18 km) southeast of Neumayer Cliffs, at the northeast end of the Kirwan Escarpment in Queen Maud Land. Mapped by Norwegian cartographers from surveys and air photos by Norwegian-British-Swedish Antarctic Expedition (NBSAE) (1949–52) and air photos by the Norwegian expedition (1958–59) and named Sistefjell (the last mountain).
