= Klevetind Peak =

Mountain in Queen Maud Land, Antarctica

Klevetind Peak (71°59′S 7°37′E) is a peak, 2,910 metres (9,550 ft) high, immediately south of Klevekampen Mountain in the Filchner Mountains of Queen Maud Land, Antarctica. It was photographed from the air by the Third German Antarctic Expedition (1938–39), was mapped from surveys and air photos by the Sixth Norwegian Antarctic Expedition (1956–60) and named Klevetind (the closet peak).
