= Tanna Peak =

Mountain in Queen Maud Land, Antarctica

Tanna Peak (72°20′S 1°20′E) is a peak at the east side of the mouth of Rogstad Glacier in the Sverdrup Mountains, Queen Maud Land. Photographed from the air by the German Antarctic Expedition (1938–39). Mapped by Norwegian cartographers from surveys and air photos by Norwegian-British-Swedish Antarctic Expedition (NBSAE) (1949–52) and air photos by the Norwegian expedition (1958–59) and named Tanna (the tooth).
