= Valery Rozov =

Russian BASE jumper

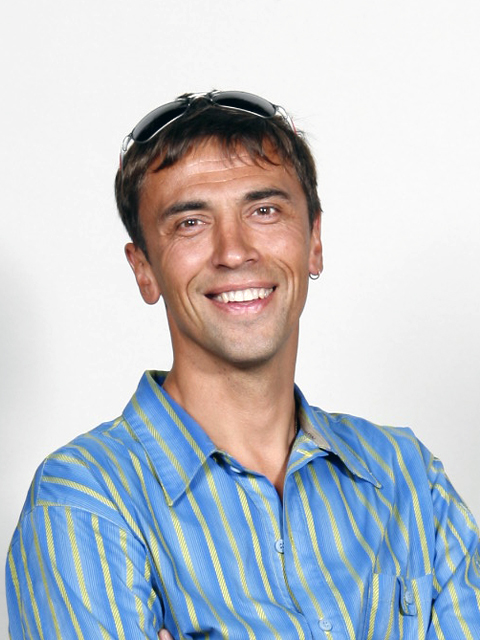
- Valery Rozov in 2007
- Born: December 26, 1964; Gorky, Russian SFSR, Soviet Union (Now: Nizhny Novgorod, Russia)
- Died: November 11, 2017 (aged 52); Mount Ama Dablam, Nepal
- Education: Moscow Institute of Electronic Technology (MIET)
- Years active: 1998–2017
- Website: https://www.redbull.com/int-en/athlete/valery-rozov

Valery Vladimirovich Rozov (December 26, 1964 – November 11, 2017) was a Russian BASE jumper, who became known for jumping from the world's highest summits. He currently holds the record for highest BASE jump in the world.

== Notable jumps ==
22 July 2004
Rozov completed the first wingsuit BASE jump from Amin Brakk in Pakistan.

25 February 2008
Rozov made the first BASE jump from Cerro Torre in a wingsuit.

9 December 2010
Rozov became the first person to climb and BASE jump from the 2,931 metres (9,616 ft) Ulvetanna Peak in Antarctica.

25 May 2012
Rozov made the first BASE jump from the summit of Shivling at an altitude of 6,420 metres (21,060 ft) wearing a wingsuit.

5 May 2013
Jumped off Changtse (the northern peak of the Mount Everest massif) from a height of 7,220 metres (23,690 ft). Using a specially developed Red Bull wingsuit, he glided down to the Rongbuk glacier more than 1,000 meters below, setting a new world record for the highest base jump.

5 October 2016
Rozov broke his own record for the highest wingsuit BASE by jumping from 7,700 metres (25,300 ft) on Cho Oyu in 2016.

== Death ==
Rozov died on November 11, 2017, while jumping from a height of 6,812 metres (22,349 ft) off Ama Dablam mountain in Nepal. According to members of his group, Rozov crashed into the side of the mountain. He was 52 years old.

== See also ==
- List of Mount Everest records
- Didier Delsalle (Summited Everest with helicopter in 2005)
