= Portnipa Peak =

Mountain in Queen Maud Land, Antarctica

Portnipa Peak (72°14′S 2°24′E) is a peak, 2,665 m, surmounting Von Essen Mountain and Porten Pass in the Gjelsvik Mountains, Queen Maud Land. Photographed from the air by the German Antarctic Expedition (1938–39). Mapped by Norwegian cartographers from surveys and air photos by Norwegian-British-Swedish Antarctic Expedition (NBSAE) (1949–52) and air photos by the Norwegian expedition (1958–59) and named Portnipa (the gateway peak).
