= Heikampen Peak =

Mountain in Antarctica

Highest point
- Coordinates: 72°28′S 0°41′E

Geography
- Location: Queen Maud Land, Antarctica
- Parent range: Robin Heights, Sverdrup Mountains

Heikampen Peak (72°28′S 0°41′E) is a peak at the southeast end of the Robin Heights in the Sverdrup Mountains of Queen Maud Land, Antarctica. It was photographed from the air by the Third German Antarctic Expedition (1938–39). It was mapped by Norwegian cartographers from surveys and air photos by the Norwegian–British–Swedish Antarctic Expedition (1949–52) from and air photos by the Norwegian expedition (1958–59) and named Heikampen (the upland mountain top).
