= Rimebrekka Slope =

Ice slope in Queen Maud Land, Antarctica

Rimebrekka Slope (72°8′S 13°14′E) is a crevassed ice slope 4 nautical miles (7 km) south of Rimekalvane Nunataks in the Weyprecht Mountains of Queen Maud Land. Mapped by Norwegian cartographers from surveys and air photos by the Norwegian Antarctic Expedition (1956–60) and named Rimebrekka (the frost slope).
