= Mount Van Pelt =

Mountain in Queen Maud Land, Antarctica

Mount Van Pelt (71°15′S 35°43′E) is a steep, bare rock mountain (2,000 m) next east of Mount DeBreuck in the northern part of the Queen Fabiola Mountains. It was discovered on October 7, 1960, by the Belgian Antarctic Expedition under Guido Derom, and was named by Derom for Guy Van Pelt, a radio operator on Belgian aircraft during reconnoitering flights in this area in 1960.
