= Brattebotnen Cirque =

Cirque in Antarctica

Brattebotnen Cirque (71°43′S 10°15′E) is a steep-sided cirque in the west wall of Mount Dallmann, in the Orvin Mountains of Queen Maud Land. It was mapped by Norway from air photos and from surveys by the Sixth Norwegian Antarctic Expedition, 1956–1960, and named Brattebotnen (the "steep cirque").
