= Kubusdaelda =

Ravine in Antarctica

Kubusdaelda (71°59′S 7°26′E) is a steep, ice-filled ravine between Kubus Mountain and Klevekampen Mountain in the Filchner Mountains of Queen Maud Land, Antarctica. It was plotted from surveys and air photos by the Sixth Norwegian Antarctic Expedition (1956–60) and named Kubusdaelda (the cube dell) in association with Kubus Mountain.
