= Mount Schicht =

Mountain in Antarctica

Mount Schicht (71°26′S 13°8′E) is a prominent mountain with several summits, rising 4 nautical miles (7 km) west-southwest of Ritscher Peak in the Gruber Mountains of Queen Maud Land. The feature was discovered by the German Antarctic Expedition under Ritscher, 1938–39, and named Schichtberge (stratum mountains) because of its appearance.

Ufsebotnen Cirque sits 1 mile (1.6 km) north of the summit. It was discovered and plotted from air photos by German Antarctic Expedition, 1938–39. Replotted from air photos and surveys by Norwegian Antarctic Expedition, 1956–60, and named Ufsebotnen (the bluff cirque).
