= Svarthorna Peaks =

Mountain in Queen Maud Land, Antarctica

Svarthorna Peaks (71°35′S 12°37′E) is a series of five or more peaks on the curving ridge that forms the south end of Mittlere Petermann Range, in the Wohlthat Mountains of Queen Maud Land. Discovered by the German Antarctic Expedition under Ritscher, 1938–39, who gave the descriptive name "Schwarze Horner" (black peaks). The peaks were remapped by the Norwegian Antarctic Expedition, 1956–60, who used the spelling Svarthorna. The Norwegian spelling has been recommended by Advisory Committee on Antarctic Names (US-ACAN) to agree with associated features in the area having this name.
