= Austvorren Ridge =

Rock ridge in Queen Maud Land, Antarctica

Austvorren Ridge (73°6′S 1°35′W) is the eastern of two rock ridges which trend northward from the Neumayer Cliffs in Queen Maud Land, Antarctica. It was photographed from the air by the Third German Antarctic Expedition (1938–39), and mapped by Norwegian cartographers from surveys by the Norwegian–British–Swedish Antarctic Expedition (1949–1952), led by John Schjelderup Giæver and from air photos by the Norwegian expedition (1958–59) and given the name "Austvorren" (the "east jetty").
