= Storknolten Peak =

Mountain in Queen Maud Land, Antarctica

Storknolten Peak (72°11′S 8°3′E) is a peak about 1 nautical mile (1.9 km) west of Muller Crest at the south end of the Filchner Mountains, Queen Maud Land. Photographed from the air by the German Antarctic Expedition (1938–39). Mapped by Norwegian cartographers from surveys and air photos by the Norwegian Antarctic Expedition (1956–60) and named Storknolten (the big knoll).
