= Krasnov Rocks =

Grouping of rocks in Australia

The Krasnov Rocks (71°48′S 10°20′E) are a linear group of rocks 2 nautical miles (4 km) south-southeast of the summit of Mount Dallmann, in the Orvin Mountains of Queen Maud Land, Antarctica. They were mapped from air photos and surveys by the Sixth Norwegian Antarctic Expedition, 1956–60, were remapped by the Soviet Antarctic Expedition, 1960–61, and named after Russian geographer A.N. Krasnov.
