= Vestvorren Ridge =

Ridge in Queen Maud Land, Antarctica

Vestvorren Ridge (73°6′S 1°53′W) is the western of two rock ridges which trend northward from the Neumayer Cliffs in Queen Maud Land. It was photographed from the air by the German Antarctic Expedition (1938–39). It was then mapped by Norwegian cartographers from surveys and air photos by Norwegian-British-Swedish Antarctic Expedition (NBSAE) (1949–52) and air photos by the Norwegian expedition (1958–59) and named Vestvorren, meaning "the west jetty."
