= Tverrnipa Peak =

Mountain in Queen Maud Land, Antarctica

Highest point
- Elevation: 2,195 m (7,201 ft)
- Coordinates: 72°15′S 1°19′E

Naming
- Etymology: Norwegian for “the transverse peak”

Geography
- Location: Queen Maud Land, Antarctica
- Parent range: Sverdrup Mountains

Climbing
- First ascent: Unknown

Tverrnipa Peak is a peak, 2,195 m, surmounting the north end of Tverrveggen Ridge in the Sverdrup Mountains, Queen Maud Land. Photographed from the air by the German Antarctic Expedition (1938–39). Mapped by Norwegian cartographers from surveys and air photos by Norwegian-British-Swedish Antarctic Expedition (NBSAE) (1949–52) and air photos by the Norwegian expedition (1958–59) and named Tverrnipa (the transverse peak).
