= Smirnov Peak =

Mountain in Queen Maud Land, Antarctica

Smirnov Peak (71°43′S 10°38′E) is a sharp peak, 2,105 m (6,906 feet), standing 2.5 nautical miles (4.6 km; 2.9 mi) south of Ristkalvane Nunataks in Shcherbakov Range, Orvin Mountains, in Queen Maud Land. Mapped from air photos and surveys by Norwegian Antarctic Expedition, 1956–60; remapped by Soviet Antarctic Expedition, 1960–61, and named after Aleksandr A. Smirnov, a member of the expedition.
