= Iskollen Hill =

Geographic feature in Antarctica

Iskollen Hill (72°51′S 4°9′W) is a broad, snow-covered hill with a few rock outcrops at the summit, lying southwest of Raudberg Valley in the southwestern part of the Borg Massif, in Queen Maud Land, Antarctica. It was mapped by Norwegian cartographers from surveys and air photos by the Norwegian–British–Swedish Antarctic Expedition (1949–52) and named Iskollen (the ice hill).
