= Veten Mountain =

Mountain in Queen Maud Land, Antarctica

Veten Mountain (72°37′S 3°50′W) is a mountain about 2 nautical miles (3.7 km) northwest of Hogskavlen Mountain in the Borg Massif of Queen Maud Land. It was mapped by Norwegian cartographers from surveys and air photos by the Norwegian-British-Swedish Antarctic Expedition (NBSAE) (1949–52) and named Veten, meaning "the beacon."
