= Chervov Peak =

Mountain in Antarctica

Highest point
- Elevation: 2,550 metres (8,370 ft)

Geography
- Parent range: Shcherbakov Range

Chervov Peak (71°50′S 10°33′E) is a peak, 2,550 metres (8,370 ft) high, rising 1 nautical mile (2 km) north of Morkenatten Peak in the Shcherbakov Range of the Orvin Mountains, in Queen Maud Land. It was roughly plotted from air photos by the Third German Antarctic Expedition, 1938–39. It was mapped from air photos and surveys by the Sixth Norwegian Antarctic Expedition, 1956–60, remapped by the Soviet Antarctic Expedition, 1960–61, and named after Soviet geologist Ye. I. Chervov.
