= Sandnesstaven Peak =

Mountain in Queen Maud Land, Antarctica

Sandnesstaven Peak (71°41′S 9°39′E) is a peak, 2,030 m, at the north end of the Conrad Mountains in the Orvin Mountains of Queen Maud Land. From 1956 to 1960, the Norwegian Antarctic Expedition mapped the peak using air photos and surveys and named it Sandnesstaven (the sand point staff).
