= Splinten Peak =

Mountain in Queen Maud Land, Antarctica

Splinten Peak (72°41′S 3°59′W) is one of the Seilkopf Peaks, standing just north of Pilarryggen in the Borg Massif of Queen Maud Land. Mapped by Norwegian cartographers from surveys and air photos by Norwegian-British-Swedish Antarctic Expedition (NBSAE) (1949–52) and named Splinten (the splinter).
