= Drygalski Mountains =

Mountain range in Antarctica

Coordinates: 71°45′S 8°15′E

Location of Drygalski Mountains in Queen Maud Land, Antarctica

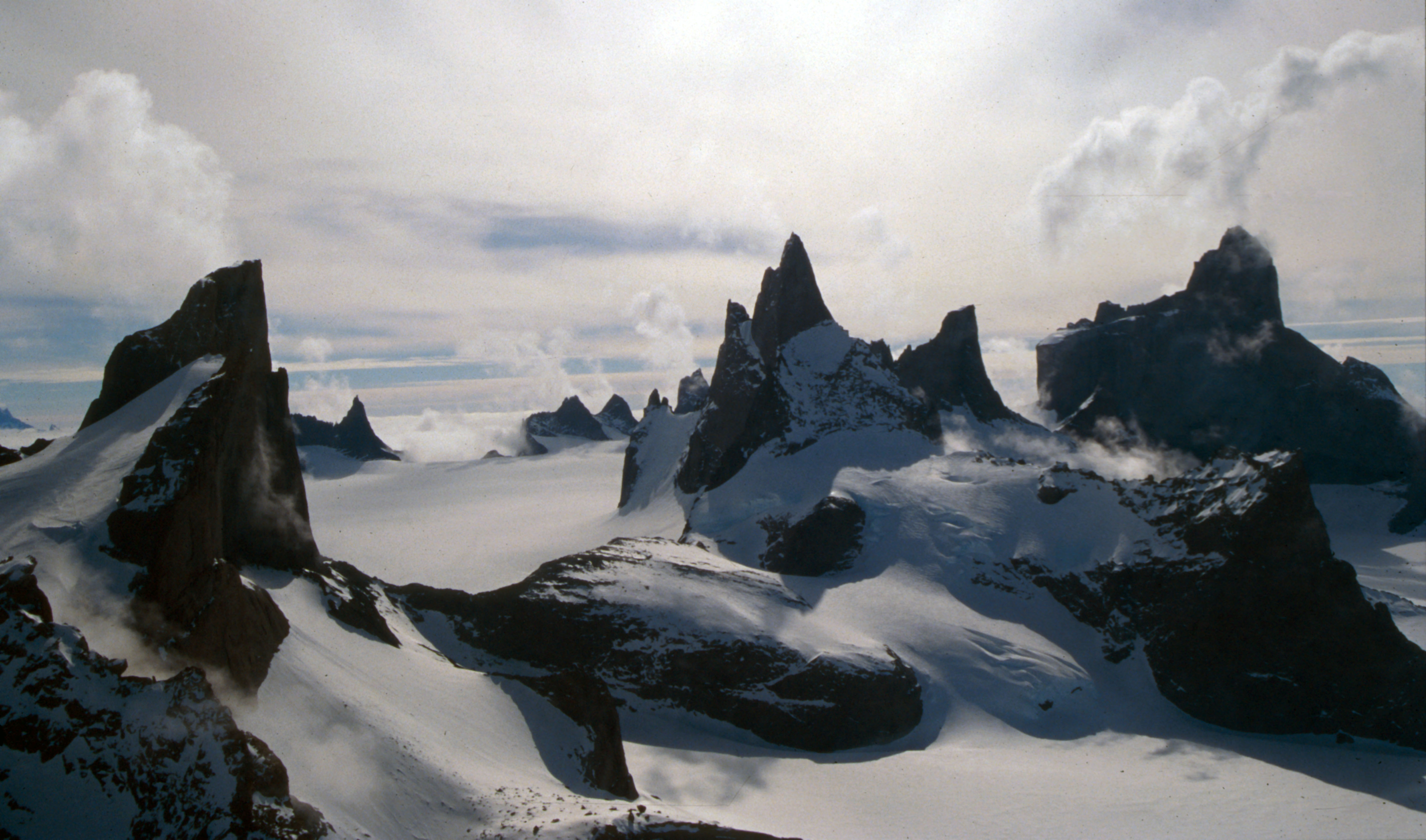
Southern Drygalski Mountains. Ulvetanna Peak on the right.

The Drygalski Mountains are a group of scattered mountains and nunataks lying between the Filchner Mountains and the Kurze Mountains in the Orvin Mountains of Queen Maud Land. They were discovered by the Third German Antarctic Expedition (1938–1939), led by Captain Alfred Ritscher, and named for Professor Erich von Drygalski, the leader of the First German Antarctica Expedition of 1901–03. They were remapped from air photos and survey by the Sixth Norwegian Antarctic Expedition, 1956–60.

The highest peak is Ulvetanna Peak at 2,930 metres (9,600 ft).

== See also ==
- Fenristunga
- List of mountains of Queen Maud Land
