= Vendehø Heights =

Mountain in Queen Maud Land, Antarctica

Vendeho Heights (72°19′S 1°28′E) is a broad ice-covered elevation surmounted by several rock crags, rising close southeast of Tverrveggen Ridge in the Sverdrup Mountains, Queen Maud Land. It was photographed from the air by the German Antarctic Expedition (1938–39) and mapped by Norwegian cartographers from surveys and air photos by Norwegian-British-Swedish Antarctic Expedition (NBSAE) (1949–52) and air photos by the Norwegian expedition (1958–59) and named Vendeho.
