= Gluvrekletten Peak =

Mountain Peak in Antarctica

Gluvrekletten Peak (72°12′S 2°32′E) is a peak, 2,200 metres (7,200 ft) high, between Terningskarvet Mountain and Nupskammen Ridge in the Gjelsvik Mountains of Queen Maud Land, Antarctica. It was photographed from the air by the Third German Antarctic Expedition (1938–39). It was mapped by Norwegian cartographers from surveys and air photos by the Norwegian–British–Swedish Antarctic Expedition (1949–52) and the Norwegian expedition (1958–59) and named Gluvrekletten.
