= Maud Subglacial Basin =

Maud Subglacial Basin (81°S 15°E) is a large subglacial basin situated southward of the Wohlthat Mountains in southern Queen Maud Land. Seismic soundings in the area were made by United States Antarctic Research Program field parties in several seasons from 1964 to 1968. It was so named by the Advisory Committee on Antarctic Names for its location in Queen Maud Land.
