= Skorvehallet Slope =

Ice slope in Queen Maud Land, Antarctica

Skorvehallet Slope (71°59′S 9°12′E) is a snow-covered slope with numerous rock outcrops, lying just west of the Gagarin Mountains in the Orvin Mountains, Queen Maud Land. Mapped by Norwegian cartographers from air photos and surveys by Norwegian Antarctic Expedition, 1956–60, and named Skorvehallet.
