= Stornupen Peak =

Mountain in Queen Maud Land, Antarctica

Stornupen Peak (72°10′S 2°22′E) is a peak, 2,275 m, in the south part of Nupskammen Ridge, in the Gjelsvik Mountains, Queen Maud Land. Photographed from the air by the German Antarctic Expedition (1938–39). Mapped by Norwegian cartographers from surveys and air photos by Norwegian-British-Swedish Antarctic Expedition (NBSAE) (1949–52) and air photos by the Norwegian expedition (1958–59) and named Stomupen (the big mountain peak).
