= Zhil'naya Mountain =

Zhil'naya Mountain (71°40′S 12°38′E) is the central mountain, 2,560 m, of the Svarthausane Crags, in Südliche Petermann Range, Wohlthat Mountains, Queen Maud Land. Discovered and plotted from air photos by German Antarctic Expedition, 1938–39. Mapped from air photos and surveys by Norwegian Antarctic Expedition, 1956–60; remapped by Soviet Antarctic Expedition, 1960–61, and named "Gora Zhil'naya" (branching mountain).
