= Mount Mirotvortsev =

Mountain in Antarctica

Mount Mirotvortsev (71°50′S 12°17′E) is a mountain, 2,830 metres (9,300 ft) high, standing 1.5 nautical miles (3 km) northeast of Mount Neustruyev in the Südliche Petermann Range of the Wohlthat Mountains, Antarctica. It was discovered and plotted from air photos by the Third German Antarctic Expedition in 1938–39, and was mapped from air photos and surveys by the Sixth Norwegian Antarctic Expedition, 1956–60. The mountain was remapped by the Soviet Antarctic Expedition in 1960–61, and named after K.N. Mirotvortsev (1880–1950), a Soviet geographer and explorer.
