= Skarsnuten Peak =

Mountain/peak

Skarsnuten Peak (72°32′S 0°22′E) is a peak in the north part of Roots Heights, Sverdrup Mountains, in Queen Maud Land, Antarctica. Photographed from the air by the German Antarctic Expedition (1938–39). Mapped by Norwegian cartographers from surveys and air photos by Norwegian-British-Swedish Antarctic Expedition (NBSAE) (1949–52) and air photos by the Norwegian expedition (1958–59) and named Skarsnuten (the gap peak).
