= Høgskavlpiggen Peak =

Mountain in Queen Maud Land, Antarctica

Høgskavlpiggen Peak (72°39′S 3°45′W) is a peak rising from the western part of Høgskavlen Mountain, in the Borg Massif of Queen Maud Land, Antarctica. It was mapped by Norwegian cartographers from surveys and air photos by the Norwegian–British–Swedish Antarctic Expedition (1949–52) and named Høgskavlpiggen (the high snowdrift peak).
