= Mount Hallgren =

Mountain in Queen Maud Land, Antarctica

Mount Hallgren (73°23′S 3°22′W) is a mountain, largely ice-covered, with a steep, rocky northern face, situated 27 nautical miles (50 km) southwest of the Neumayer Cliffs in the Kirwan Escarpment, Queen Maud Land, Antarctica. It was mapped by Norwegian cartographers from surveys and air photos by the Norwegian–British–Swedish Antarctic Expedition (1949–1952) and additional air photos (1958–59), and named for Stig E. Hallgren, a photographer with the expedition.
