= Holtanna Peak =

Mountain in Queen Maud Land, Antarctica

Coordinates: 71°55′S 8°22′E

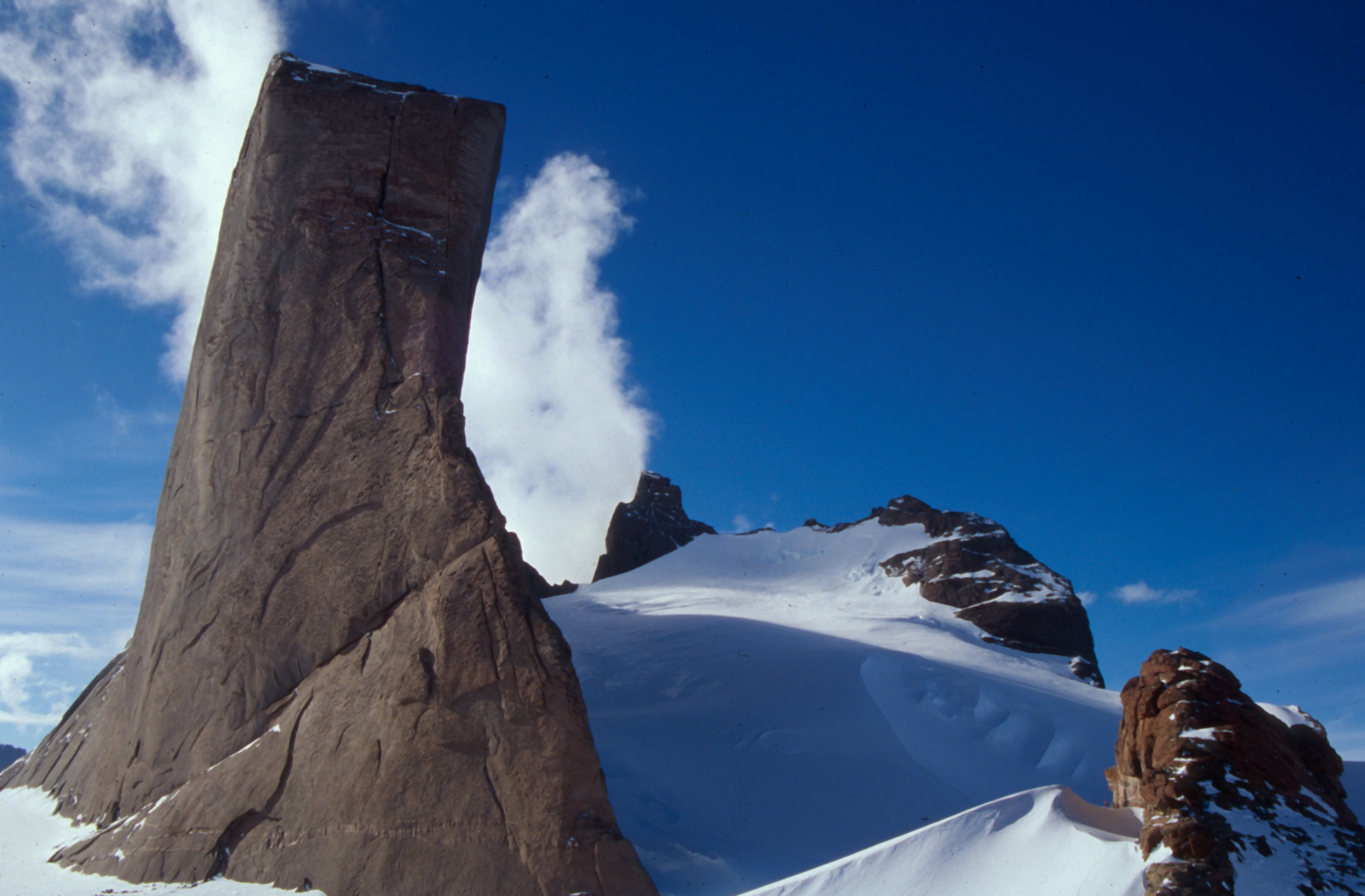
Holtanna Peak

Holtanna Peak is a peak, 2,650 metres (8,700 ft) high, whose eastern portion is occupied by a small cirque glacier, standing 1 nautical mile (2 km) north of the Mundlauga Crags in the eastern part of Fenriskjeften Mountain in Queen Maud Land, Antarctica. It was mapped from surveys and air photos by the Sixth Norwegian Antarctic Expedition (1956–60) and named Holtanna (the hollow tooth).
