= Ytstenut Peak =

Mountain in Queen Maud Land, Antarctica

Ytstenut Peak (72°30′S 2°50′W) is the northeasternmost peak in the Borg Massif, in Queen Maud Land. It was mapped by Norwegian cartographers from surveys and air photos by the Norwegian-British-Swedish Antarctic Expedition (NBSAE) (1949–1952) led by John Schjelderup Giæver and the Norwegian expedition (1958–59). Its name, Ytstenut, means "outermost peak".
