= Pinegin Peak =

Mountain in Queen Maud Land, Antarctica

Pinegin Peak (71°44′S 12°33′E) is a central peak, 2,595 m, on Isdalsegga Ridge in Sudliche Petermann Range, Wohlthat Mountains. Discovered and plotted from air photos by German Antarctic Expedition, 1938–39. Mapped from air photos and surveys by Norwegian Antarctic Expedition, 1956–60; remapped by Soviet Antarctic Expedition, 1960–61, and named after Soviet polar explorer N.V. Pinegin (1883–1940).
