= Mount Neustruyev =

Mountain in Queen Maud Land, Antarctica

Coordinates: 71°51′S 12°14′E

Mount Neustruyev (also known as Gora Neustruyeva) is a peak in East Antarctica, 2,900 m, standing 5 mi NNE of Gneiskopf Peak in Südliche Petermann Range, Wohlthat Mountains, Queen Maud Land.

== Discovery and naming ==
Mount Neustruyev was discovered and plotted from air photos by the Third German Antarctic Expedition (1938–1939), led by Capt. Alfred Ritscher. Mapped from air photos and surveys by Sixth Norwegian Antarctic Expedition, 1956–60; remapped by Soviet Antarctic Expedition, 1960–61, and named after the Soviet geographer S.S. Neustruyev (1874–1928).

== See also ==
- List of mountains of Queen Maud Land
