= Svartbandufsa Bluff =

Bluff in Queen Maud Land, Antarctica

Svartbandufsa Bluff (73°29′S 3°48′W) is a bluff at the southwest side of Tverregg Glacier in the Kirwan Escarpment, Queen Maud Land. Mapped by Norwegian cartographers from surveys and air photos by Norwegian-British-Swedish Antarctic Expedition (NBSAE) (1949–52) and additional air photos (1958–59), and named Svartbandufsa (the black band bluff).
