= Tjuvholene Crags =

The Tjuvholene Crags (71°57′S 4°28′E) are a series of high rock crags measuring at 2,495 m at sea level, which form the northern end of Mount Grytoyr in the Muhlig-Hofmann Mountains of Queen Maud Land. Mapped from surveys and air photos by the Norwegian Antarctic Expedition (1956–60), the formation was named Tjuvholene (the thief's lair).
