= Östliche Petermann Range =

Mountain range of Queen Maud Land, Antarctica

The Östliche Petermann Range (German: Östliche Petermannkette, "Eastern Petermann Range", 71°26′S 12°44′E) is one of the Petermann Ranges. It is trending in a north–south direction for 15 nautical miles (28 km), from Per Spur to the Gornyye Inzhenery Rocks, in the Wohlthat Mountains of Queen Maud Land. It was discovered and plotted from air photos by German Antarctic Expedition of 1938–39, and so named by them for its eastern location in the Petermann Ranges.

== Named features ==
A number of features in the Östliche Petermann Range have been charted and named by expeditions and survey groups, primarily the German Antarctic Expedition of 1938-39 and the Norwegian Antarctic Expedition of 1956–60.

Mount Deildenapen is a broad mountain mass rising to 2,050 metres (6,730 ft) and forming the east wall of Deildedalen Valley in the Östliche Petermann Range. The Deildedalen Valley, which is a small valley partly filled with ice and opening to the north, sits between Mount Deildenapen and a similar mountain mass just to the west. Deildegasten Ridge is a ridge about 5 nautical miles (10 km) long which rises just south of Deildedalen Valley. The root word "Deilde" in all of these names means "divide" or "border" in Norwegian. Hence Deildenapen means "the dividing mountain", and Deildedalen means "the dividing valley". Dildegasten refers to the deildegast, which in Norse folklore was the ghost of a person who disrespected border-stones in life.

On the south part of Deildegasten Ridge, Mount Razumovskiy rises 2,285 m (7,497 ft). It was discovered and plotted from air photos by the German Antarctic Expedition of 1938–39, then from air photos and surveys by the Sixth Norwegian Antarctic Expedition of 1956–60. Finally, it was remapped by the Soviet Antarctic Expedition of 1960–61, and named after Soviet geologist N.K. Razumovskiy, 1893–1967.

The northern extremity of the range is marked by Per Spur, named for J. Per Madsen, a meteorologist with Norwegian Antarctic Expedition, 1958–59. Vitnesteinen Rock is a large rock outcrop along the west side of the range. Its name means "the witness stone" in Norwegian. Just south of Deildegasten Ridge are the Gornyye Inzhenery Rocks, a group of rocks first discovered and plotted from air photos by the Third German Antarctic Expedition, 1938–39. They were remapped by the Soviet Antarctic Expedition of 1960–61, and named "Skaly Gornykh Inzhenerov", meaning "mining engineers' rocks".
