= Slettefjellet =

Slettefjellet (71°45′S 6°55′E) is a peak 1 nautical mile (1.9 km) north of Gessner Peak at the northeast end of the Muhlig-Hofmann Mountains, Queen Maud Land. Plotted from surveys and air photos by the Norwegian Antarctic Expedition (1956–1960) and named Slettefjellet (the smooth peak).
