= Kinntanna Peak =

Peak in Antarctica

Kinntanna Peak (71°53′S 8°21′E) is a sharp peak, 2,725 metres (8,940 ft) high, about 1 nautical mile (2 km) north of Holtanna Peak in the eastern part of Fenriskjeften Mountain in Queen Maud Land, Antarctica. It was mapped from surveys and air photos by the Sixth Norwegian Antarctic Expedition (1956–60) and named Kinntanna (the molar).
