= Ryvingen Peak =

Mountain in Queen Maud Land, Antarctica

Ryvingen Peak (72°55′S 3°29′W) is a rock peak 3 nautical miles (6 km) west-southwest of Brapiggen Peak, on the southern side of Borg Massif in Queen Maud Land. Mapped by Norwegian cartographers from surveys and air photos by Norwegian-British-Swedish Antarctic Expedition (NBSAE) (1949–52) and named Ryvingen.
