= Mount Sphinx =

Mountain in Queen Maud Land, Antarctica

Coordinates: 72°21′S 31°15′E

Mount Sphinx is a mountain rising to 2,200 m, the culminating peak of the Prince de Ligne Mountains, standing 9 nautical miles (17 km) north of the Belgica Mountains. Discovered by Belgian Antarctic Expedition, 1957-58, under G. de Gerlache, who named it for its characteristic form resembling a sphinx.
