= Vedkosten Peak =

Mountain in Queen Maud Land, Antarctica

Vedkosten Peak (72°1′S 3°58′E) is a 2,285 m tall bare peak standing 1 nautical mile (1.9 km) southeast of Hoggestabben Butte in the Muhlig-Hofmann Mountains of Queen Maud Land. It was mapped by Norwegian cartographers from surveys and air photos by the Norwegian Antarctic Expedition (1956–60) and named Vedkosten (the wooden broom).
