= Mount Mentzel =

Mountain in Queen Maud Land, Antarctica

Highest point
- Coordinates: 71°22′S 13°40′E

Climbing
- First ascent: 1939

Mount Mentzel (German: Mentzelberg) is a peak, 2,330 metres (7,640 ft) high, standing 6 nautical miles (11 km) east of Mount Zimmermann in the Gruber Mountains of Queen Maud Land, Antarctica. it was discovered by the Third German Antarctic Expedition under Alfred Ritscher, 1938–39, and named for Rudolf Mentzel, the president of the Deutsche Forschungsgemeinschaft (German Research Society).
