= Egil Peak =

Mountain in Antarctica

Egil Peak (72°24′S 1°18′E) is a peak, 2,640 metres (8,660 ft) high, at the east side of Isingen Mountain, in the Sverdrup Mountains of Queen Maud Land. It was photographed from the air by the Third German Antarctic Expedition (1938–39). It was mapped by Norwegian cartographers from surveys and air photos by the Norwegian–British–Swedish Antarctic Expedition (NBSAE) (1949–52) and from air photos by the Norwegian expedition (1958–59), and was named for Egil Rogstad, chief radio operator with the NBSAE.
