= Linnormegget Hill =

Hill in Antarctica

Linnormegget Hill (72°8′S 14°27′E) is a rock hill 3 nautical miles (6 km) south of the Linnormen Hills in the Payer Mountains of Queen Maud Land, Antarctica. It was photographed from the air by the Third German Antarctic Expedition (1938–39), and was mapped by Norwegian cartographers from surveys and air photos by the Sixth Norwegian Antarctic Expedition (1956–60) and named Linnormegget (the dragon's egg).
