= Remplingen Peak =

Mountain in Queen Maud Land, Antarctica

Remplingen Peak (72°5′S 4°18′E) is a peak, 2,650 m, at the north end of Langfloget Cliff in the Muhlig-Hofmann Mountains, Queen Maud Land. Mapped by Norwegian cartographers from surveys and air photos by the Norwegian Antarctic Expedition (1956–60) and named Remplingen (the calf).
