= Vedskålen Ridge =

Ridge in Antarctica

Vedskalen Ridge (72°3′S 3°56′E) is a prominent rock and ice ridge on the northwest side of Mount Hochlin, in the Muhlig-Hofmann Mountains of Queen Maud Land. It was mapped by Norwegian cartographers from surveys and air photos by the Norwegian Antarctic Expedition (1956–60) and named Vedskalen (the wooden shed).
