= Mundlauga Crags =

High rock crags group

Highest point
- Elevation: 2,455 m (8,054 ft)
- Coordinates: 71°57′S 8°24′E

Geography
- Location: Queen Maud Land, Antarctica
- Parent range: Drygalski Mountains

Mundlauga Crags is a group of 2,455 m (8,054 ft) high rock crags that form the south end of Fenriskjeften Mountain in the Drygalski Mountains, Queen Maud Land in Antarctica. They were mapped from surveys and air photos by the Norwegian Antarctic Expedition (1956–60) and named Mundlauga.

== See also ==
- Fenriskjeften Mountain
- Drygalski Mountains
- Queen Maud Land
