= Ulvetanna =

Peak in Antarctica

Ulvetanna Peak
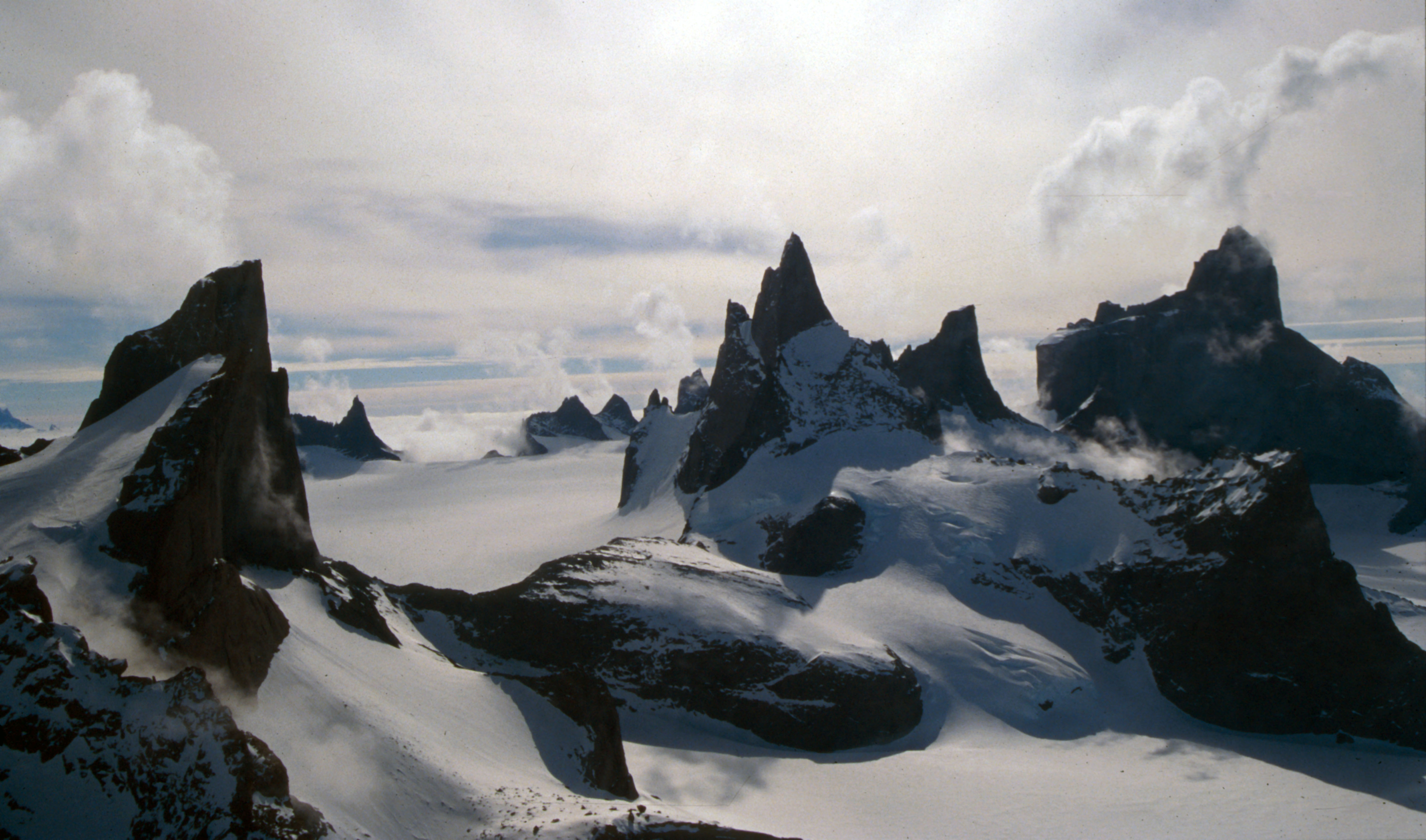
- The southern Drygalski Mountains in NW direction. The peak on the right is the Ulvetanna.

Highest point
- Elevation: 2,931 m (9,616 ft)
- Prominence: 1,045 m (3,428 ft)
- Listing: Ribu
- Coordinates: 71°51′S 8°20′E

Geography
- Location within Antarctica
- Location: Queen Maud Land, Antarctica

Ulvetanna (Norwegian: the wolf's tooth, German: Matterhorn) is a sharp peak (2,931 m) in Queen Maud Land, Antarctica. It was first climbed in February 1994. The mountain was first discovered by the German Antarctic expedition in 1938 and named after the Swiss mountain Matterhorn because of its similar form. Later the mountain was also named Ulvetanna by the Norwegians.

== Geography ==
Ulvetanna lies about 3.2 km (2 mi) north of Kinntanna Peak in the Fenriskjeften Mountain (Norwegian: Fenrir's maw) in the east part of Queen Maud Land, Antarctica. The peak is one of the most demanding on the continent and its mile-long northeast ridge has been described as one of “the last great climbs”. Mapped from surveys and air photos by the Sixth Norwegian Antarctic Expedition (1956–60) and named Ulvetanna.

== Climbing history ==
=== First ascent ===
The summit was first reached in February 1994 by Robert Caspersen, Sjur Nesheim and Ivar Tollefsen by the NW face.

=== Later ascents ===
- In November 2006, Caspersen and Tollefsen returned with Stein-Ivar Gravdal and Trond Hilde and climbed the North face in 16 days.
- In December 2008, Alexander Huber, Thomas Huber and Stephan Siegrist climbed the NW buttress.
- In December 2010, Valery Rozov made a wingsuit BASE jump from the peak, flying 45 seconds in the air before opening his parachute.
- From December 2012 to January 2013, a team led by Leo Houlding and including Alastair Lee, Chris Rabone, Sean 'Stanley' Leary, Jason Pickles, and David Reeves made the first ascent of a new route up the north-east ridge, and is documented in Lee's film, The Last Great Climb (2013).
- From January to February 2014, a team led by Andy Kirkpatrick with Aleksander Gamme, Jonas Langseth, Kjersti Eide, Ingeborg Jacobsen, and Espen Fadnes ascended the South Ridge in 12 days.
