= Ormehausen Peak =

Mountain in Queen Maud Land, Antarctica

Ormehausen Peak (72°1′S 14°38′E) is a peak at the north end of Linnormen Hills in the Payer Mountains of Queen Maud Land. Photographed from the air by the German Antarctic Expedition (1938–39). Mapped by Norwegian cartographers from surveys and air photos by the Norwegian Antarctic Expedition (1956–60) and named Ormehausen (the serpent's head).
