= Ormesporden Hill =

Hill in Antarctica

Ormesporden Hill (72°5′S 14°19′E) is a hill in the Antarctic. It is at the southwest end of Linnormen Hills in the Payer Mountains of Queen Maud Land. Mapped by Norwegian cartographers from surveys and air photos by the Norwegian Antarctic Expedition (1956–60) and named Ormesporden (the serpent's tail).
