= Ritscher Peak =

Mountain in Queen Maud Land, Antarctica

- Location within Antarctica

Highest point
- Elevation: 2,790 metres (9,150 ft)
- Coordinates: 71.404°S 13.352°E

Geography
- Location: Antarctica
- Parent range: Gruber Mountains

Ritscher Peak (German: Ritschergipfel) is a 2,790-metre (9,150 ft) peak located 11 kilometres (7 mi) west-southwest of Mount Mentzel in the Gruber Mountains of Queen Maud Land, Antarctica. This peak was discovered and mapped by the Third German Antarctic Expedition of 1938–39 and was named for Capt. Alfred Ritscher, leader of the expedition.
