= Domen Butte =

Butte in Antarctica

Domen Butte (72°43′S 3°50′W) is a snow-topped butte with steep rock sides, just southwest of Hogskavlen Mountain in the Borg Massif of Queen Maud Land. It was mapped by Norwegian cartographers from surveys and air photos by the Norwegian–British–Swedish Antarctic Expedition (1949–52) and named Domen (the dome).
