= Høgfonna Mountain =

Mountain in Antarctica

Høgfonna Mountain (72°45′S 3°33′W) is a high, flat, snow-topped mountain with sheer rock sides, standing 3 miles (5 km) southeast of Hogskavlen Mountain in the Borg Massif, Queen Maud Land, Antarctica. It was mapped by Norwegian cartographers from surveys and air photos by the Norwegian–British–Swedish Antarctic Expedition (1949–1952), led by John Schjelderup Giæver, and named Høgfonna (the high snowfield).

Hogfonnaksla Ridge (72°44′S 3°34′W), a high rock ridge, forms the north end of the mountain, while Hogfonnhornet Peak (72°46′S 3°37′W) surmounts its southern extremity.

== See also ==
- Breidskaret Pass
