= Mount DeBreuck =

Mountain in Antarctica

Mount DeBreuck (71°16′S 35°40′E) is the northernmost massif in the Queen Fabiola Mountains. The feature is mainly ice free, linear in plan, and rises to about 2,000 metres (6,600 ft). It was discovered on October 7, 1960, by the Belgian Antarctic Expedition under Guido Derom, who named it for William DeBreuck, a glaciologist and observer aboard Belgian aircraft during reconnoitering flights in this area.
