= Mount Zimmermann =

Mountain in Queen Maud Land, Antarctica

- Location within Antarctica

Highest point
- Coordinates: 71°20′S 13°20′E

Geography
- Location: Queen Maud Land (claimed by Norway)

Mount Zimmermann (German: Zimmermannberg) is a 2,325 m (7,628 ft) peak standing 6 km (3.7 mi) north of Ritscher Peak in the Gruber Mountains, central Queen Maud Land. It was discovered by the Third German Antarctic Expedition (1938–1939), led by Capt. Alfred Ritscher, and named for the vice-president of the Deutsche Forschungsgemeinschaft (German Research Society).
