= Trollslottet Mountain =

Mountain in Queen Maud Land, Antarctica

Trollslottet Mountain (71°56′S 7°14′E) is a high ridgelike mountain with several prominent peaks, forming the northwest limit of the Filchner Mountains in Queen Maud Land. Plotted from surveys and air photos by Norwegian Antarctic Expedition (1956–60) and named Trollslottet (the troll castle).
