= Isdalsegga Ridge =

Ridge of Queen Maud Land, Antarctica

Isdalsegga Ridge (71°45′S 12°33′E) is a rock ridge surmounted by Pinegin Peak, forming the east wall of Isdalen Valley in the Südliche Petermann Range of the Wohlthat Mountains, Antarctica. It was discovered and plotted from air photos by the Third German Antarctic Expedition, 1938–39. It was replotted from air photos and surveys by the Sixth Norwegian Antarctic Expedition, 1956–60, and named "Isdalsegga" (the ice valley ridge) in association with Isdalen Valley.

== Mount Ramenskiy ==
Mount Ramenskiy is a mountain, 2,560 m, forming the south end of the Isdalsegga Ridge. It is 6km northwest of Astor Rocks. Discovered and plotted from air photos by German Antarctic Expedition, 1938–39. Mapped from air photos and surveys by Norwegian Antarctic Expedition, 1956–60; remapped by Soviet Antarctic Expedition, 1960–61, and named after Soviet botanist L.G. Ramenskiy (1884–1953).
