= Südliche Petermann Range =

Mountain range in Antarctica

The Südliche Petermann Range

Geography
- Continent: Antarctica
- Region: Queen Maud Land
- Range coordinates: 71°46′S 12°20′E

Südliche Petermann Range (German: Südliche Petermannkette, also known as Söre Petermannkjeda, and Gory Otto Grotevolya) is one of the Petermann Ranges, trending NE-SW for 35 km (22 mi) from Svarthausane Crags to Gneiskopf Peak, in the Wohlthat Mountains, Queen Maud Land. Mount Neustruyev (also known as Gora Neustruyeva) is a 2,900 meter peak standing 8 km (5.0 mi) NNE of Gneiskopf Peak.

== Discovery and naming ==
Südliche Petermann Range was discovered and plotted from air photos by the Third German Antarctic Expedition (1938-1939), led by Capt. Alfred Ritscher, which gave directional names to the eastern, middle and western units of the Petermann Ranges. This range was named Sore Petermannkjeda by Sixth Norwegian Antarctic Expedition, 1956–60, because of its southern position in association with other units in the Petermann Ranges. A German form of this name has been recommended by US-ACAN to agree with spellings adopted for the aforementioned ranges.

== Features ==
- Aurdalsegga Ridge
- Bystrov Rock
- Gneiskopf Peak
- Isdalen Valley
- Isdalsegga Ridge
- Krasheninnikov Peak
- Mount Kolodkin
- Mount Mirotvortsev
- Mount Neustruyev
- Zhil'naya Mountain

== See also ==
- List of mountains of Queen Maud Land
