= Betekhtin Range =

Mountain range in Antarctica

- Location within Antarctica

Geography
- Continent: Antarctica
- Region: Queen Maud Land
- Range coordinates: 71°54′S 11°32′E

The Betekhtin Range (71°54′S 11°32′E) is a mountain range about 14 nautical miles (26 km; 16 mi) long, forming the southern arm of the Humboldt Mountains in Queen Maud Land, Antarctica.

== Exploration and naming ==
The Betekhtin Range was discovered and plotted from air photos by the German Antarctic Expedition (1938–1939) (GerAE), mapped from air photos and from surveys by the Sixth Norwegian Antarctic Expedition, 1956–60, and remapped by the Soviet Antarctic Expedition, 1960–61. It was named after Soviet Academician Anatoliy Georgievich Betekhtin.

== Features ==
Features of the Betekhtin Range and nearby features include, from north to south Mount Skarshovden, Hovdeskar Gap, Skarshaugane Peaks, Taborovskiy Peak, Skarsbrotet Glacier, Skeidsnutane Peaks, Mount Khmnyznikov, Hånuten and Yanovskiy Rocks

=== Mount Skarshovden ===
71°47′S 11°38′E. A rounded mountain, 2,830 metres (9,280 ft) high, surmounting the west side of Hovdeskar Gap. Discovered and photographed by the GerAE, 1938-39. Mapped by Norway from air photos and surveys by NorAE, 1956-60, and named Skarshovden (the gap mountain).

=== Pervomayskaya Peak ===
71°47′S 11°40′E. A peak, 2,795 metres (9,170 ft) high, standing 1 nautical mile (1.9 km; 1.2 mi) northeast of Mount Skarshovden. Discovered and plotted from air photos by GerAE, 1938-39. Mapped from air photos and surveys by NorAE, 1956-60. Remapped by SovAE, 1960-61, and named Gora Pervomayskaya (May 1st Mountain).

=== Hovdeskar Gap ===
71°47′S 11°39′E. A gap just east of Mount Skarshovden at the head of Skarsbrotet Glacier. Discovered and photographed by the GerAE, 1938-39. Mapped by Norway from air photos and surveys by NorAE, 1956-60, and named Hovdeskar (knoll gap).

=== Skarshaugane Peaks ===
71°49′S 11°37′E. A group of peaks including Mount Skarshovden that extend south for 3 nautical miles (5.6 km; 3.5 mi) from Hovdeskar Gap. Discovered and photographed by the GerAE, 1938-39. Mapped by Norway from air photos and surveys by NorAE, 1956-60, and named Skarshaugane (the gap peaks).

=== Taborovskiy Peak ===
71°48′S 11°35′E. The highest peak, 2,895 metres (9,498 ft) high, in the Skarshaugane Peaks of the Betekhtin Range. Discovered and plotted from air photos by GerAE, 1938-39. Mapped from air photos and surveys by NorAE, 1956-60. Remapped by SovAE, 1960-61, and named after Soviet meteorologist N.L. Taborovskiy.

=== Skarsbrotet Glacier ===
71°50′S 11°45′E. A cirque-type glacier draining the east slopes of Skarshaugane Peaks. Discovered and photographed by the GerAE, 1938-39. Mapped by Norway from air photos and surveys by the NorAE, 1956-60, and named Skarsbrotet.

=== Skeidsnutane Peaks ===
71°53′S 11°35′E. A group of peaks that extend south for about 6 nautical miles (11 km; 6.9 mi) from Skarshaugane Peaks. Discovered and photographed by the GerAE, 1938-39. Mapped by Norway from air photos and surveys by NorAE, 1956-60, and named Skeidsnutane.

=== Mount Khmyznikov ===
71°52′S 11°39′E. A peak, 2,800 metres (9,200 ft) high, in the north part of Skeidsnutane Peaks, Betekhtin Range. Discovered and plotted from air photos by GerAE, 1938-39. Mapped from air photos and surveys by NorAE, 1956-60. Remapped by SovAE, 1960-61, and named after Soviet hydrographer P.K. Khmyznikov.

=== Hånuten ===
71°54′S 11°34′E. A mountain peak, 2,885 metres (9,465 ft) high in Skeidsnutane, Betechtinkjeda. This name originates from Norway.

=== Yanovskiy Rocks ===
71°56′S 11°40′E. Two isolated rock outcrops lying 5 nautical miles (9.3 km; 5.8 mi) south of Mount Khmyznikov. First mapped from air photos and surveys by SovAE, 1960-61, and named after Soviet hydrographer S.S. Yanovskiy.

== Sources ==
- Alberts, Fred G., ed. (1995), Geographic Names of the Antarctic (PDF) (2 ed.), United States Board on Geographic Names This article incorporates public domain material from websites or documents of the United States Board on Geographic Names.
- "Hånuten", SCAR Gazetteer, Scientific Committee on Antarctic Research (SCAR)
