= Frostlendet Valley =

Valley in the East Antarctican Land of Queen Maud

Coordinates: 72°46′S 3°18′E

Frostlendet Valley is an ice-filled valley, about 15 miles (24 km) long, draining northeastward along the south side of Hogfonna Mountain, in the Borg Massif of Queen Maud Land, Antarctica. It was mapped by Norwegian cartographers from surveys and air photos by the Norwegian–British–Swedish Antarctic Expedition (1949–52) and named Frostlendet (the frost ground).

== See also ==
- History of Antarctica
- List of Antarctic expeditions
