= Filchner Mountains =

Mountain range in Antarctica

Coordinates: 72°3′S 7°40′E

Location of Filchner Mountains in Queen Maud Land, Antarctica

The Filchner Mountains (German: Filchnerberge) are a group of mountains 11 km (7 mi) southwest of the Drygalski Mountains, at the western end of the Orvin Mountains of Queen Maud Land, Antarctica. They were discovered by the Third German Antarctic Expedition (1938–1939), led by Capt. Alfred Ritscher, and named for Wilhelm Filchner, leader of the German expedition to the Weddell Sea area in 1911–12. They were remapped from air photos taken by the Sixth Norwegian Antarctic Expedition, 1958–59.

== See also ==
- Djupedalsleitet Saddle
- List of mountains of Queen Maud Land
- Kubusdaelda
- Kubusdalen
