= Høgskavlen Mountain =

Mountain in Queen Maud Land, Antarctica

Høgskavlen Mountain (72°40′S 3°43′W) is a prominent, flattish, snow-topped mountain just northeast of Domen Butte in the Borg Massif of Queen Maud Land, Antarctica. It was mapped by Norwegian cartographers from surveys and air photos by the Norwegian–British–Swedish Antarctic Expedition (1949–52) and named Høgskavlen (the high snowdrift).
