= Weyprecht Mountains =

Mountain range in Queen Maud Land, Antarctica

- Weyprechtberge
- Location within Antarctica

Geography
- Country: Antarctica
- Range coordinates: 72°0′S 13°30′E

Weyprecht Mountains (German: Weyprechtberge, Norwegian: Weprechtfjella) is a small group of mountains about 15 km (9 mi) west of the Payer Mountains, forming the western half of the Hoel Mountains in Queen Maud Land.

They were discovered by the Third German Antarctic Expedition (1938–1939), led by Capt. Alfred Ritscher, and named for Karl Weyprecht, Austrian polar explorer who in company with Julius Payer discovered Franz Josef Land in 1873, and who initiated the first International Polar Year expedition in 1882–83.

== See also ==
- Rimebrekka Slope
