= Gruber Mountains =

Mountains of Antarctica

Location of Gruber Mountains in Queen Maud Land
Antarctica

The Gruber Mountains (German: Otto-von-Gruber-Gebirge) are a small group of mountains consisting of a main massif and several rocky outliers, forming the northeast portion of the Wohlthat Mountains in Queen Maud Land, Antarctica. They were discovered and plotted from air photos by the Third German Antarctic Expedition (GerAE), 1938–39, under Alfred Ritscher. The mountains were remapped by the Sixth Norwegian Antarctic Expedition, 1956–60, who named them for Otto von Gruber, the German cartographer who compiled maps of this area from air photos taken by the GerAE. This feature is not to be confused with "Gruber-Berge," an unidentified toponym applied by the GerAE in northern the Mühlig-Hofmann Mountains.

== Named features ==
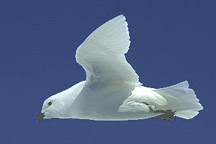
Snow petrels breed in the mountains

Several features within the Gruber Mountain range have been charted and named by expeditions and survey groups.

Mount Bastei (71°22′S 13°32′E) is a prominent buttress-type mountain 2,460 metres (8,070 ft) high, 3.7 km (2.3 mi) west of Mount Mentzel. It was discovered and named Bastei, meaning bastion, by the German Antarctic Expedition, 1938–39, under Ritscher.

Ufsekammen Ridge (71°24′S 13°14′E) is an arc-shaped rock ridge, 4.8 km (3.0 mi) long, between Mount Schicht and Ufsebrotet Bluff. It was discovered and plotted from air photos by the Third German Antarctic Expedition, 1938–39. The Norwegian Antarctic Expedition of 1956–60 replotted it from air photos and surveys and named it Ufsekammen (the bluff ridge).

== Important Bird Area ==
A 500 ha site in the mountains, in the vicinity of Lake Untersee, has been designated an Important Bird Area (IBA) by BirdLife International because it supports about 10,000 breeding snow petrels, estimated in 1983.
