= Skeidshovden Mountain =

Mountain in Queen Maud Land, Antarctica

Skeildshovden Mountain
- Location within Antarctica

Highest point
- Elevation: 2,730 m (8,960 ft)
- Coordinates: 72°8′S 11°31′E

Naming
- Language of name: Norwegian Nynorsk

Geography
- Continent: Antarctica

Geology
- Mountain type: Landform

Skeidshovden Mountain is a mountain rising to 2,730 m at the southwest end of the Wohlthat Mountains in Queen Maud Land. It was first photographed from the air by the German Antarctic Expedition (1938–39). Mapped by Norwegian cartographers from surveys and air photos by the Norwegian Antarctic Expedition (1956–60) and named Skeidshovden.
