= Shcherbakov Range =

Mountain range in Antarctica

Coordinates: 71°51′S 10°32′E

Shcherbakov Range is a mountain range trending north–south for 20 miles (32 km), standing immediately east of Mount Dallmann where it marks the east extremity of the Orvin Mountains, in Queen Maud Land. Discovered and plotted from air photos by German Antarctic Expedition, 1938–39. Mapped from air photos and surveys by Norwegian Antarctic Expedition, 1956–60; remapped by Soviet Antarctic Expedition, 1960–61, and named after Soviet scientist D.I. Shcherbakov (d.1966).

== See also ==
- Slabotnen Cirque
