= Neumayer Cliffs =

Cliffs in Antarctica

Neumayer Cliffs (German: Neumayersteilwand, 73°7′S 1°45′W) is a series of abrupt rock cliffs forming the northeast end of Kirwan Escarpment in Queen Maud Land. Discovered by the German Antarctic Expedition under Alfred Ritscher, 1938–39, and named for German geophysicist Georg von Neumayer. Surveyed by the Norwegian-British-Swedish Antarctic Expedition (NBSAE), 1949–52.

== See also ==
- Årmålsryggen
