= Kirwan Escarpment =

Coordinates: 73°25′S 3°30′W

Location of Kirwan Escarpment in Queen Maud Land
Antarctica

The Kirwan Escarpment (Norwegian: Kirwanveggen) is a prominent northwest-facing escarpment which lies south of the Penck Trough in Queen Maud Land, Antarctica. The escarpment is featured by moderate-height cliffs and prominent rock spurs interspersed with glaciers and steep ice slopes and trends northeast–southwest for about 90 nautical miles (170 km). At least the northern end of this feature (Neumayer Cliffs) was included in the aerial photography of the general area by the Third German Antarctic Expedition (1938–39), but the maps resulting from that expedition do not portray the escarpment properly. The escarpment was mapped by Norwegian cartographers from surveys and air photos (1958–59) and named for Laurence P. Kirwan, Director of the Royal Geographical Society.

Skavlsletta Flat is a small ice-covered area lying between Svartbandufsa Bluff and Tverregga Spur in the Kirwan Escarpment. Norwegian cartographers named it Skavlsletta, meaning "the snowdrift plain". The Duken Flat is located near the southwest end of the escarpment.

== See also ==
- Svelget
