= Orvin Mountains =

Mountain range in Antarctica

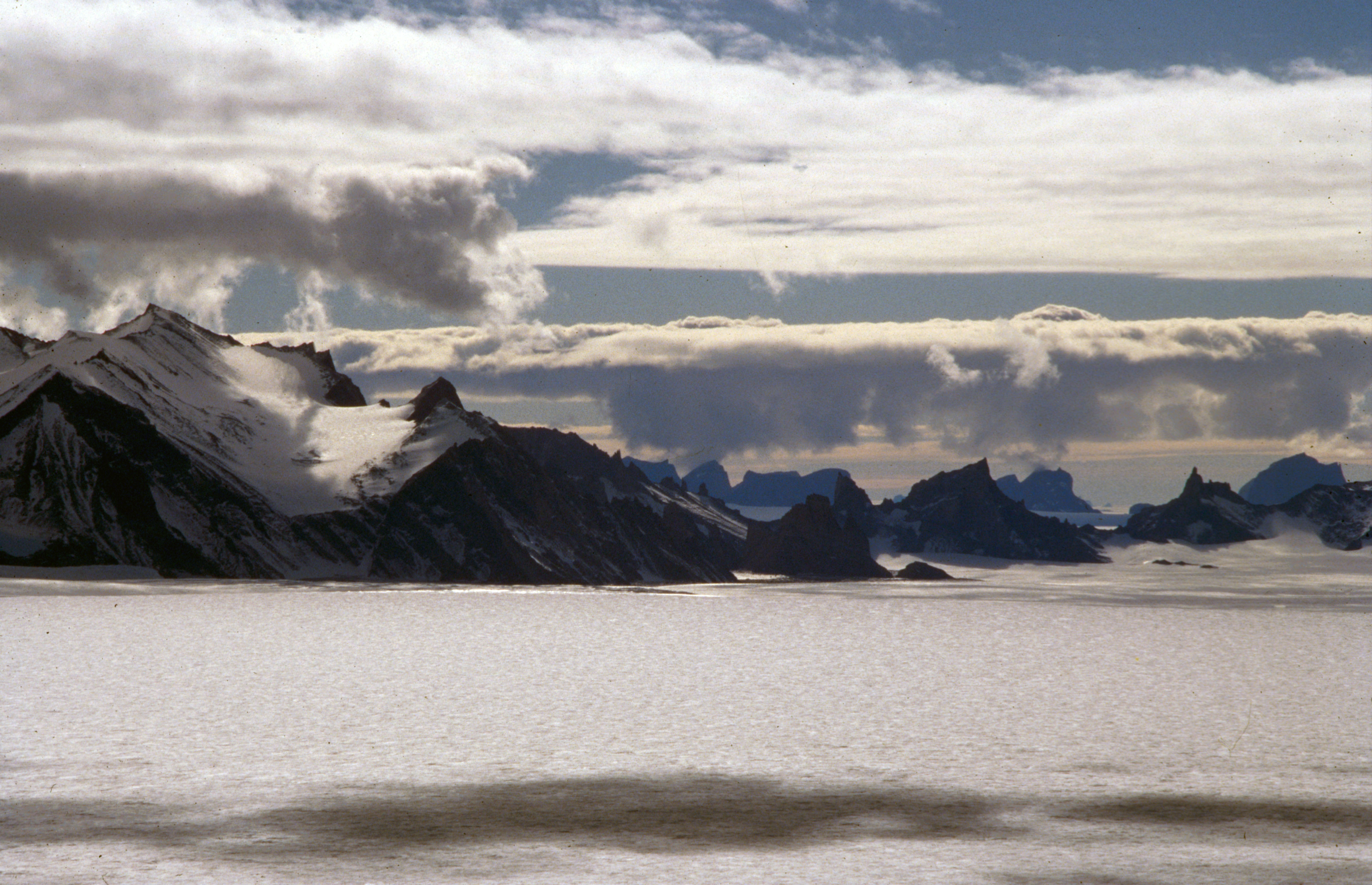
- View looking to the west over Glopeken Glacier. Glopeken Glacier is located in the northern part of the Conrad Mountains, a subrange of the Orvin Mountains.

Highest point
- Peak: Sandeggtind Peak
- Elevation: 3,055 m (10,023 ft)
- Coordinates: 72°00′00″S 09°00′00″E

Naming
- Native name: Orvinfjella (Norwegian)

Geography
- Location within Antarctica
- Continent: Antarctica
- Region(s): Queen Maud Land, East Antarctica
- Parent range: Fimbulheimen

The Orvin Mountains (Norwegian: Orvinfjella) constitute a major group of mountain ranges, extending for about 100 km (62 mi) between the Wohlthat Mountains and the Mühlig-Hofmann Mountains in Queen Maud Land. With its summit at 3,055 metres (10,023 ft), the massive Sandeggtind Peak forms the highest point in the Conrad Mountains, a subrange of the Orvin Mountains.

== Discovery and naming ==
First photographed from the air and roughly plotted by the Third German Antarctic Expedition (1938-1939), led by Capt. Alfred Ritscher. Mapped by Norwegian cartographers from surveys and air photos by the Sixth Norwegian Antarctic Expedition (1956–60) and named for Anders K. Orvin, director of the Norwegian Polar Institute from 1958 to 1959.

== Constituent ranges ==
Constituent ranges of Orvin Mountains, listed from east to west:

- Shcherbakov Range
- Mount Dallmann
- Conrad Mountains
- Gagarin Mountains
- Kurze Mountains
- Drygalski Mountains
- Filchner Mountains

== See also ==
- List of mountains of Queen Maud Land
- Skorvehallet Slope
