= Wohlthat Mountains =

Mountain range in Queen Maud Land, Antarctica

Wohlthat Mountains (German: Wohlthatmassiv) is a large group of associated mountain features consisting of the Humboldt Mountains, Petermann Ranges, and the Gruber Mountains, located immediately east of the Orvin Mountains in Fimbulheimen in the central Queen Maud Land. Discovered by the Third German Antarctic Expedition (1938–1939), led by Capt. Alfred Ritscher, and named for Prussian State Councilor Helmuth Wohlthat, who as economist and fiscal officer dealt with the organization of the expedition.

The area was reconnoitered and aerially photographed by the 5th Indian Antarctic Expedition (Nov 1985-Mar 1986) with a three-month temporary summer camp established there. The area was revisited by later Indian Antarctic expeditions.

== Astor Rocks ==
The Astor Rocks (71°48′S 12°44′E) are two small rock outcrops lying 4 miles (6 km) southeast of Mount Ramenskiy in the southeast extremity of the Wohlthat Mountains. They were plotted from air photos and from surveys by the Sixth Norwegian Antarctic Expedition (NorAE), 1956–60, and named for Astor Ernstsen, a meteorologist with the NorAE, 1958–59.

== See also ==
- Maud Subglacial Basin, situated southward of the Wohlthat Mountains
