= Norwegian–British–Swedish Antarctic Expedition =

Research expedition involving an international team of scientists (1949–1952)

Coordinates: 71.0500°S 10.9167°W

The Norwegian–British–Swedish Antarctic Expedition (also known as NBSX or NBSAE) (1949–1952) was the first Antarctica expedition involving an international team of scientists. The team members came from Norway, Sweden and the British Commonwealth of Nations.

== History ==
The Norwegian–British–Swedish Antarctic Expedition was the first expedition to Antarctica involving an international team of scientists. The expedition was led by John Schjelderup Giæver, a Norwegian author and polar researcher. The expedition had the goal of establishing whether climatic fluctuations observed in the Arctic were also occurring in the Antarctic. A base known as Maudheim was established on the Quar Ice Shelf along the coast of Queen Maud Land in February 1950. This expedition laid the groundwork for the following Australian expeditions to Antarctic from 1954 to the early 1960s.

== Transportation ==
The expedition was transported aboard a 600-ton sealer named Norsel that was powered by a German U-boat diesel engine. This ship was used in conjunction with a 24,000 ton whaling factory ship named Thorshovdi. The larger ship was needed because the Norsel was too small to carry all the needed equipment and supplies for the Antarctic expedition.

In addition to both ships, two light Auster aircraft intended for reconnaissance were included on the expedition. These were piloted by a five-man RAF team from Britain. The Norsel made three round-trips to the Antarctic, with subsequent visits accompanied by a Norwegian and a Swedish flying unit to assist with aerial photography.

== Conclusions ==
The information obtained from the expedition helped with the further study of glaciology, meteorology, and geology. It found that the world's "sea-level was principally controlled by the state of the Antarctic ice-sheet." It also improved the understanding of the impact of the Antarctic ice-sheets on the regulation of the world's climate. It also found evidence that suggest a portion of Antarctica (Dronning Maud Land) was once joined to southern Africa. Further scientific studies have also found strong evidence that eastern Antarctica was adjacent to southern Africa until the late Jurassic period.

== Personnel ==
- John Giaever Norwegian, leader of the wintering party
- Valter Schytt Swedish, chief glaciologist, second-in-command
- Gordon de Quetteville Robin Australian, geophysicist, third-in-command
- Nils Jørgen Schumacher Norwegian, chief meteorologist
- Gösta Liljequist Swedish, assistant meteorologist
- Ernest Frederick Roots Canadian, chief geologist
- Alan Reece British, assistant geologist
- Charles Swithinbank British, assistant glaciologist
- Nils Roer Norwegian, topographic surveyor
- Ove Wilson Swedish, medical officer
- Bertil Ekström Swedish, mechanical engineer
- Egil Rogstad Norwegian, radio operator
- Peter Melleby Norwegian, in charge of dogs
- Schølberg Nilsen Norwegian, cook

Additional members that joined at a later date:

- Stig Hallgren
- Leslie Quar
- John Jelbart
- John Snarby
- Tom Stobart British, made the official film of the expedition.

== See also ==
- List of Antarctic expeditions
- Maudheim medal
