= Ristelen Spur =

Ristelen Spur (71°59′S 5°37′E) is a rock spur about 5 nautical miles (9 km) southeast of the summit of Breplogen Mountain, standing between the flow of Vestreskorve and Austreskorve Glaciers in the Muhlig-Hofmann Mountains of Queen Maud Land, Antarctica. Plotted from surveys and air photos by the Norwegian Antarctic Expedition (1956–1960) and named Ristelen (the plowshare). It is also called Krylova Gora in Russia and simply Ristelen in Norway.
