= Fimbulheimen =

Mountain range in Antarctica

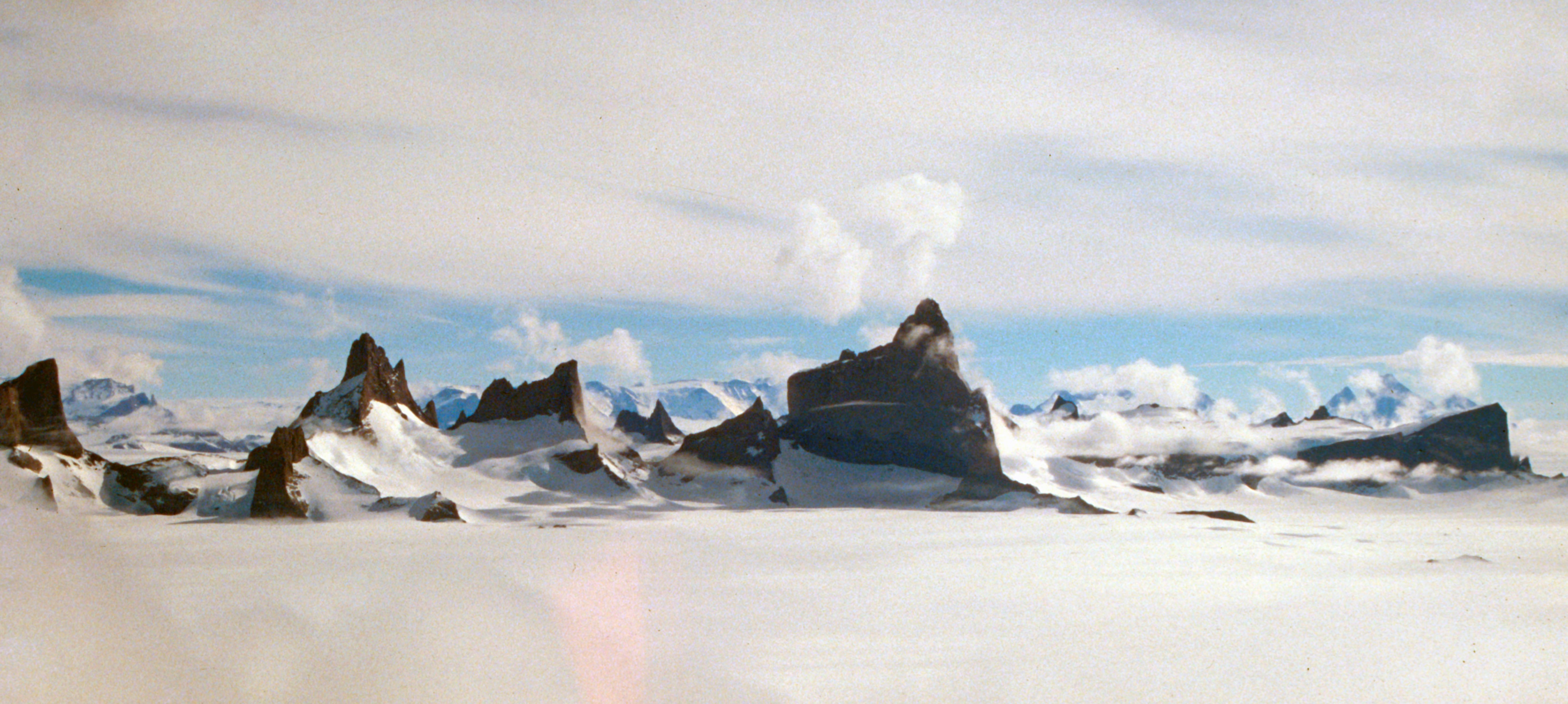
- Drygalskiberge in the Fimbulheimen Mountains

Highest point
- Peak: Jøkulkyrkja
- Elevation: 3,148 m (10,328 ft)

Geography
- Location within Antarctica

Fimbulheimen is a mountain range in Queen Maud Land, Antarctica. It stretches from Jutulstraumen by 1° west of Carsten Borchgrevink Ice at 18° east, about 200 km from the ice edge. Fimbulheimen is thus between Maudheim Plateau and Sør-Rondane.

Dronning Maud's highest mountain, Jøkulkyrkja (elevation 3148 m), is located in Mühlig-Hofmann Mountains in Fimbulheimen. The name comes from Fimbulvetr, the harsh winter immediately preceding Ragnarok in Norse mythology.

A number of smaller ranges and mountain areas constitutes Fimbulheimen, from west to east:

- Gburek Peaks 72°10′00″S 0°16′00″W
- Sverdrup Mountains 72°22′00″S 0°40′00″E
- Gjelsvik Mountains 72°05′00″S 2°50′00″E
- Mühlig-Hofmann Mountains 72°00′00″S 5°30′00″E
- Kuml 71°59′00″S 16°39′00″E
- Orvin Mountains 71°55′00″S 9°00′00″E
  - Filchner Mountains 72°00′00″S 7°30′00″E
  - Drygalski Mountains 71°47′00″S 8°15′00″E
  - Kurze Mountains 71°50′00″S 9°00′00″E
  - Gagarin Mountains 71°58′00″S 9°23′00″E
  - Conrad Mountains 71°50′00″S 9°42′00″E
  - Mount Dallmann 71°45′00″S 10°20′00″E
- Wohlthat Mountains 71°40′00″S 12°10′00″E
  - Humboldt Mountains 71°40′00″S 11°30′00″E
  - Petermann Ranges 71°41′00″S 12°25′00″E
  - Gruber Mountains 71°22′00″S 13°25′00″E
- Hoel Mountains 72°00′00″S 14°00′00″E
  - Weyprecht Mountains 72°00′00″S 13°30′00″E
  - Payer Mountains 72°00′00″S 14°30′00″E
- Lomonosov Mountains 71°33′00″S 15°24′00″E

The Norwegian research station Troll is located by Jutulsessen Mountain west in Fimbulheimen, while the ornithological field station Tor is about 100 km further east at Svarthamaren Mountain in Mühlig-Hofmann Mountains.

Large parts of the area were mapped by the Norwegian Antarctic Expedition 1956-60. The Norwegian Polar Institute has published twelve map sheets of Fimbulheimen in scale 1:250 000.
