= Sverre Peak =

Mountain in Queen Maud Land, Antarctica

Sverre Peak (71°43′S 9°39′E) is a small peak 0.5 nautical miles (0.9 km) off the north end of Pettersen Ridge in the Conrad Mountains of Queen Maud Land. Discovered and photographed by the German Antarctic Expedition, 1938–39. Mapped by Norway from air photos and surveys by the Norwegian Antarctic Expedition, 1956–60, and named for Sverre Pettersen, steward with Norwegian Antarctic Expedition, 1957–58.
