= Kvea Valley =

Valley in Queen Maud Land, Antarctica

Kvea Valley (71°55′S 4°30′E) is a rectangular ice-filled valley between Grinda Ridge and Skigarden Ridge, northward of Mount Grytøyr in the Mühlig-Hofmann Mountains of Queen Maud Land, Antarctica. It was mapped from surveys and air photos by the Sixth Norwegian Antarctic Expedition (1956–60) and named Kvea (the sheepcote).
