= Anders Peak =

Mountain in Queen Maud Land, Antarctica

Highest point
- Elevation: 2,135 m (7,005 ft)

Geography
- Location: Antarctic Treaty area
- Parent range: Holtedahl Peaks

Anders Peak (71°45′S 9°1′E) is a peak 2,135 metres (7,000 ft) high, rising 1 nautical mile (2 km) south of the Gruvletindane Crags of the Holtedahl Peaks, in the Orvin Mountains of Queen Maud Land. It was mapped by Norwegian cartographers from air photos and surveys by the Sixth Norwegian Antarctic Expedition, 1956–60, and named for Anders Vinten-Johansen, a medical officer with the expedition, 1957–58.
