= Hamarglovene Crevasses =

Crevasse field in Antarctica

The Hamarglovene Crevasses (71°56′S 5°5′E) are a crevasse field in lower Vestreskorve Glacier just east of Hamaroya Mountain, in the Mühlig-Hofmann Mountains of Queen Maud Land, Antarctica. They were mapped from surveys and air photos by the Sixth Norwegian Antarctic Expedition (1956–60) and named Hamarglovene (the hammer clefts).
