= Kvitholten Hill =

Hill in Antarctica

Kvitholten Hill (71°49′S 5°51′E) is a snow-clad hill at the east side of Austreskorve Glacier, standing just south of Sagbladet Ridge in the Mühlig-Hofmann Mountains of Queen Maud Land, Antarctica. It was plotted from surveys and air photos by the Sixth Norwegian Antarctic Expedition (1956–60) and named Kvitholten (the white grove).
