= Dublitskiy Bay =

Bay of Queen Maud Land in Antarctica

Dublitskiy Bay (70°5′S 7°45′E) is a bay 12 nautical miles (22 km) wide indenting the ice shelf fringing the coast of Queen Maud Land. The bay lies 70 nautical miles (130 km) north of the Sigurd Knolls, and is separated from Kamenev Bight by Cape Krasinskiy.

The feature was photographed from the air by the Sixth Norwegian Antarctic Expedition in 1958–59 and mapped from these photos. It was also mapped in 1961 by the Soviet Antarctic Expedition and named for K.A. Dublitskiy, former captain of the icebreaker Fyodor Litke.
