= Nikolayev Range =

Mountain range in Antarctica

Nikolayev Range (71°54′S 6°2′E) is a range standing between Austreskorve Glacier and Lunde Glacier in the Muhlig-Hofmann Mountains, Queen Maud Land. Mapped by Norsk Polarinstitutt from surveys and air photos by Norwegian Antarctic Expedition, 1956–60. Also mapped by Soviet Antarctic Expedition in 1961 and named for Andriyan G. Nikolayev, Soviet astronaut.
