= Langflog Glacier =

Glacier in Antarctica

- Location of Queen Maud Land in Antarctica

- Location within Antarctica
- Location: Queen Maud Land
- Coordinates: 72°6′S 4°14′E
- Length: 8 nmi (15 km; 9 mi)
- Thickness: unknown
- Terminus: Mühlig-Hofmann Mountains
- Status: unknown

Langflog Glacier (72°6′S 4°14′E) is a glacier flowing north between Mount Hochlin and Langfloget Cliff in the Mühlig-Hofmann Mountains of Queen Maud Land, Antarctica. It was mapped by Norwegian cartographers from surveys and air photos by the Sixth Norwegian Antarctic Expedition (1956–60) and named Langflogbreen (long rock wall glacier).

== See also ==
- List of glaciers in the Antarctic
- Glaciology
