= Svartnupen Peak =

Mountain in Queen Maud Land, Antarctica

Svartnupen Peak (71°55′S 8°53′E) is a peak on the south side of Hakon Col in the Kurze Mountains of Queen Maud Land. Mapped from surveys and air photos by Norwegian Antarctic Expedition (1956–60) and named Svartnupen (the black peak).
