= Petrellfjellet =

Petrellfjellet (71°59′S 4°50′E) is a prominent, mainly ice-free mountain between Slokstallen Mountain and Mount Grytoyr in the Muhlig-Hofmann Mountains, Queen Maud Land. Mapped by Norwegian cartographers from surveys and air photos by the Norwegian Antarctic Expedition (1956–60) and named Petrellfjellet (the petrel mountain).
