= Skorvetangen Spur =

Skorvetangen Spur (72°3′S 5°20′E) is a rock spur 2 nautical miles (3.7 km) southeast of Hamarskorvene Bluff in the Muhlig-Hofmann Mountains, Queen Maud Land. It was mapped by Norwegian cartographers from surveys and air photos provided by the Norwegian Antarctic Expedition (1956–60). It was eventually named Skorvetangen.

== See also ==
- Urvantsev Rocks
