= Kyrkjedalen Valley =

Valley in Queen Maud Land, Antarctica

Kyrkjedalen Valley (71°50′S 6°53′E) is an ice-filled valley between Jøkulkyrkja Mountain and Habermehl Peak in the Mühlig-Hofmann Mountains of Queen Maud Land, Antarctica. It was plotted from surveys and air photos by the Sixth Norwegian Antarctic Expedition (1956–60) and named Kyrkjedalen (the church valley).
