= Kubbestolen Peak =

Mountain in Queen Maud Land, Antarctica

Kubbestolen Peak (71°47′S 8°54′E) is a bare rock peak, 2,070 metres (6,800 ft) high, at the northwest end of Vinten-Johansen Ridge in the Kurze Mountains of Queen Maud Land, Antarctica. It was mapped from surveys and air photos by the Sixth Norwegian Antarctic Expedition (1956–60) and named Kubbestolen (the log chair).
