= Småsponen Nunatak =

Nunatak in Queen Maud Land, Antarctica

Småsponen Nunatak (72°0′S 3°55′E) is a nunatak just northwest of Storsponen Nunatak, at the north side of Mount Hochlin in the Mühlig-Hofmann Mountains of Queen Maud Land. It was mapped from surveys and air photos by the Norwegian Antarctic Expedition (1956–60) and named Småsponen ("the little chip").
