= Sengekoven Cirque =

Cirque in Antarctica

Sengekoven Cirque (71°53′S 5°26′E) is a cirque indenting the north side of Breplogen Mountain immediately east of Hogsenga Crags, in the Muhlig-Hofmann Mountains of Queen Maud Land. Plotted from surveys and air photos by the Norwegian Antarctic Expedition (1956–60) and named Sengekoven (the bed closet).
