= Pettersen Ridge =

Ridge in Antarctica

Pettersen Ridge (71°47′S 9°42′E) is a ridge extending north for 6 nautical miles (11 km) from Sandho Heights in the Conrad Mountains of the Orvin Mountains, Queen Maud Land. Discovered and photographed by the German Antarctic Expedition, 1938–39. Mapped by Norway from surveys and air photos by the Norwegian Antarctic Expedition, 1956–60, and named for Sverre Pettersen, steward with the Norwegian Antarctic Expedition, 1957–58.
