= Mount Bolle =

Mountain in Antarctica

Mount Bolle (71°54′S 6°50′E) is a peak (2,685 m) which rises above Larsen Cliffs, 3 nautical miles (6 km) south of Kyrkjeskipet Peak, in the eastern Muhlig-Hofmann Mountains of Queen Maud Land. The name "Bolle-Berg" after Herbert Bolle, aviation supervisor of the expedition, was applied in this area by the German Antarctic Expedition (1938–39) under Alfred Ritscher. The correlation of the name with this peak may be arbitrary, but it is recommended for the sake of international uniformity and historical continuity.
