= Kyrkjedalshalsen Saddle =

Ice saddle in Queen Maud Land, Antarctica

Kyrkjedalshalsen Saddle (71°47′S 6°53′E) is an ice saddle between Gessner Peak and Habermehl Peak in the Mühlig-Hofmann Mountains of Queen Maud Land, Antarctica. It was plotted from surveys and air photos by the Sixth Norwegian Antarctic Expedition, 1956–60, and named Kyrkjedalshalsen (the church valley's neck).
