= Thälmann Mountains =

Group of mountains in the Muhlig-Hofmann Mountains

- Location within Antarctica

Highest point
- Coordinates: 72°0′S 4°45′E

Geography
- Location: Queen Maud Land, Antarctica
- Parent range: Mühlig-Hofmann Mountains

The Thälmann Mountains (72°0′S 4°45′E) are a group of mountains in the Mühlig-Hofmann Mountains between Flogeken Glacier and Vestreskorve Glacier, in Queen Maud Land. They were mapped by the Norsk Polarinstitutt from surveys and air photos by the Norwegian Antarctic Expedition, 1956–60, and also mapped by the Soviet Antarctic Expedition in 1961 and named for Ernst Thälmann, a German communist leader in the 1920s.
