= Djupedalshausane Peaks =

Mountains in Antarctica

The Djupedalshausane Peaks (72°5′S 6°59′E) are a group of peaks between the heads of Lunde Glacier and Djupedalen Valley in the Mühlig-Hofmann Mountains, Queen Maud Land. They were mapped by Norwegian cartographers from surveys and air photos by the Sixth Norwegian Antarctic Expedition (1956–60) and named Djupedalshausane (the deep valley peaks).
