= Staurneset Spur =

Staurneset Spur (71°50′S 6°33′E) is a rock spur extending northwest from Jokulkyrkja Mountain in the Muhlig-Hofmann Mountains, Queen Maud Land. Plotted from surveys and air photos by the Norwegian Antarctic Expedition (1956–60) and named Staumeset (the pole point). Stauren Peak is a peak on Staurneset Spur.
