= Stein Nunatak =

Stein Nunatak (71°42′S 7°58′E) is the largest of the Sørensen Nunataks, in the Drygalski Mountains of Queen Maud Land. Mapped from surveys and air photos by the Norwegian Antarctic Expedition (1956–60) and named for Stein Sørensen, a radio operator with the Norwegian Antarctic Expedition (1956–58).
