= Ahlstad Hills =

Hills in Antarctica

Ahlstad Hills (71°50′S 5°30′E) is a group of rock hills just east of Cumulus Mountain in the Mühlig-Hofmann Mountains of Queen Maud Land. It was plotted from surveys and air photos by the Sixth Norwegian Antarctic Expedition (1956–60), which gave it the name Ahlstadhottane.
