= Snøskalkegga Ridge =

Snoskalkegga Ridge (71°59′S 13°13′E) is a largely snow-covered ridge, about 3 nautical miles (6 km) long and surmounted at the north end by Kazanskaya Mountain, located 2 nautical miles (3.7 km) west of Dekefjellet Mountain in the Weyprecht Mountains, Queen Maud Land. Discovered and plotted from air photos by German Antarctic Expedition, 1938–39. Replotted from air photos and surveys by Norwegian Antarctic Expedition, 1956–60, and named Snoskalkegga.
