= Øvrevollen Bluff =

Øvrevollen Bluff (72°11′S 3°45′E) is a rock and ice bluff just south of Festninga Mountain in the Mühlig-Hofmann Mountains of Queen Maud Land. It was mapped by Norwegian cartographers from surveys and air photos by the Norwegian Antarctic Expedition (1956–60) and named Øvrevollen ("the upper wall").
