= Kyrkjetorget =

Cirque in Antarctica

Kyrkjetorget (71°54′S 6°57′E) is a flattish ice-filled amphitheatre on the east side of Jøkulkyrkja Mountain in the Mühlig-Hofmann Mountains of Queen Maud Land, Antarctica. It was mapped from surveys and air photos by the Sixth Norwegian Antarctic Expedition (1956–60) and named Kyrkjetorget (the church market place).
