= Urvantsev Rocks =

Urvantsev Rocks (72°6′S 5°37′E) is a groups of rocks lying 5 nautical miles (9 km) southeast of Skorvetangen Spur in the Muhlig-Hofmann Mountains, Queen Maud Land. Mapped by Norsk Polarinstitutt from surveys and air photos by Norwegian Antarctic Expedition, 1956–60. Also mapped by Soviet Antarctic Expedition in 1961 and named for geologist Nikolay Urvantsev.
