= Uppstad =

Village in Valle Municipality, Norway

Uppstad Upstad
- Village
- Interactive map of Uppstad
- Coordinates: 59.1370°N 07.5138°E
- Country: Norway
- Region: Southern Norway
- County: Agder
- District: Setesdal
- Municipality: Valle Municipality
- Elevation: 372 m (1,220 ft)
- Time zone: UTC+01:00 (CET)
  - Summer (DST): UTC+02:00 (CEST)
- Post Code: 4748 Rysstad

Uppstad is a village in Valle Municipality in Agder county, Norway. The village is located along the river Otra in the Setesdal valley, about 10 kilometres (6.2 mi) south of the village of Valle. The Norwegian National Road 9 runs past the village. The villages of Brokke, Hovet, and Rysstad lie a short distance to the south.
