= Kyrkjebakken Slope =

Ice slope in Queen Maud Land, Antarctica

Kyrkjebakken Slope (71°54′S 6°32′E) is an ice slope on the west side of Jøkulkyrkja Mountain, in the Mühlig-Hofmann Mountains of Queen Maud Land, Antarctica. It was plotted from surveys and air photos by the Sixth Norwegian Antarctic Expedition (1956–60) and named Kyrkjebakken (the church hill).
