= Stålstuten Ridge =

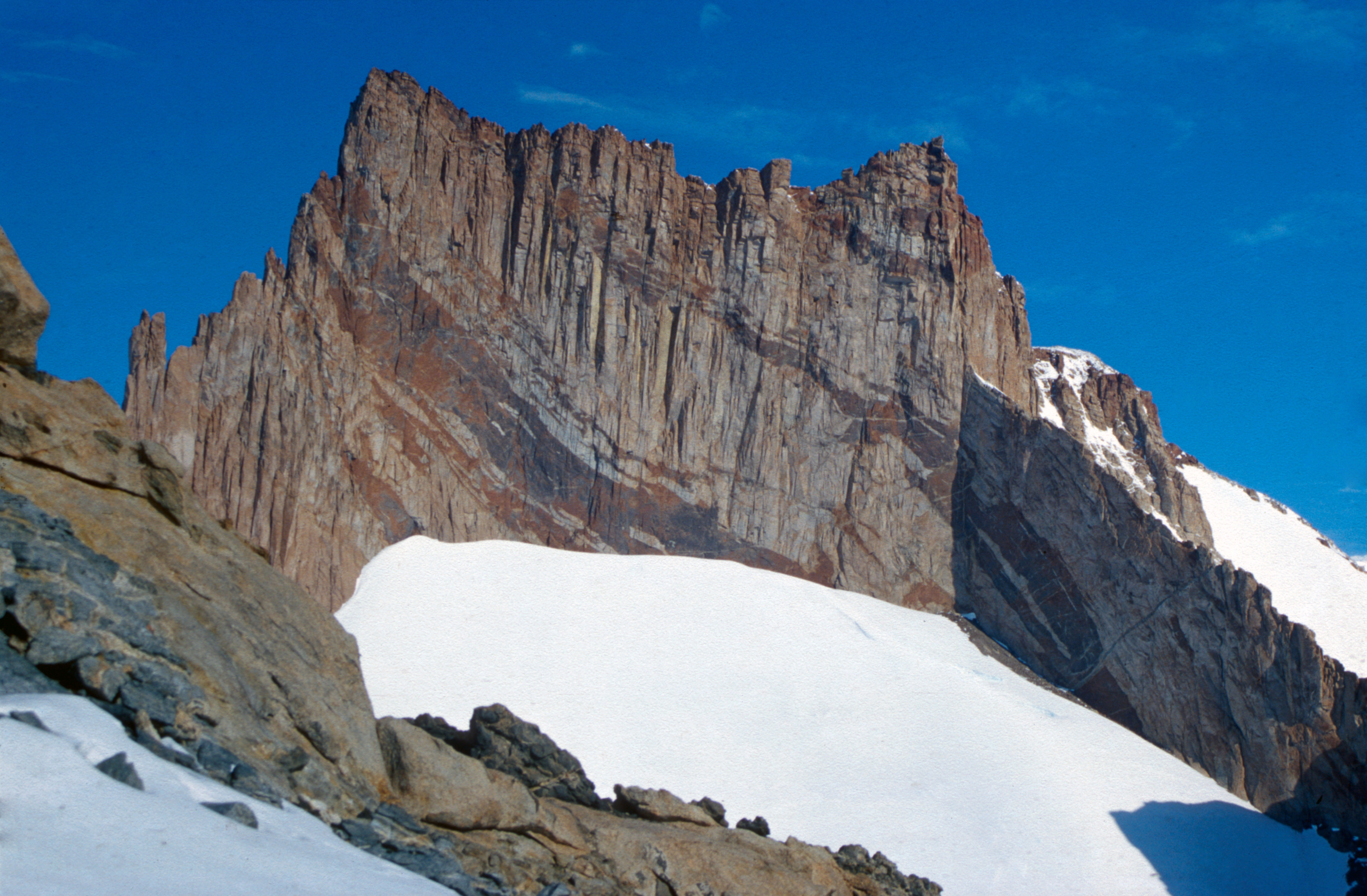
Stålstuten

Stålstuten Ridge (72°4′S 4°10′E) is a high ridge extending from the northeast side of Mount Hochlin, in the Muhlig-Hofmann Mountains of Queen Maud Land. Mapped by Norwegian cartographers from surveys and air photos by the Norwegian Antarctic Expedition (1956–60) and named Stålstuten (the bulldozer).
