= Jøkulhest Dome =

Jøkulhest Dome (71°52′S 6°42′E) is the high icecapped summit of Jokulkyrkja Mountain, in the Mühlig-Hofmann Mountains of Queen Maud Land, Antarctica. It was plotted from surveys and air photos by the Sixth Norwegian Antarctic Expedition (1956–60) and named Jøkulhest (the glacier horse).
