= Bakkesvodene Crags =

Distinctive mountain features in Antarctica

Bakkesvodene Crags (71°56′S 6°32′E) are high rock crags overlooking the east side of Lunde Glacier in the Muhlig-Hofmann Mountains, Queen Maud Land. They were plotted from surveys and from air photos by the Norwegian Antarctic Expedition (1956–60) and named "Bakkesvodene" (the "hill slopes").
