= Skredbotnen Cirque =

Cirque in Antarctica

Coordinates: 71°59′S 4°27′E

Skredbotnen Cirque is a cirque in Antarctica, indenting the west side of Mount Grytoyr in the Muhlig-Hofmann Mountains of Queen Maud Land. It was mapped from surveys and air photos by the Sixth Norwegian Antarctic Expedition (1956–60) and named Skredbotnen (the avalanche cirque).
