= Steinskaregga Ridge =

Steinskaregga Ridge (71°49′S 8°54′E) is a bare rock ridge just north of Steinskaret Gap in the Kurze Mountains of Queen Maud Land. Mapped from surveys and air photos by Norwegian Antarctic Expedition (1956–60) and named Steinskaregga (the stone gap ridge).
