= Buddenbrock Range =

Mountain range in Antarctica

Highest point
- Elevation: 1,838 m (6,030 ft)
- Coordinates: 71°52′S 5°24′E

Geography
- Country: Antarctica
- Region: Queen Maud Land

The Buddenbrock Range is a group of scattered mountains and nunataks between Austreskorve Glacier and Vestreskorve Glacier in the Mühlig-Hofmann Mountains of Queen Maud Land, Antarctica.

The name Buddenbrockkette was applied in the general area by the Third German Antarctic Expedition under Alfred Ritscher, 1938–39, for the director of the Atlantic division of the former German Lufthansa Corporation. The correlation of the name with this feature may be arbitrary but is recommended for the sake of international uniformity and historical continuity.
