= Sloknuten Peak =

Mountain in Queen Maud Land, Antarctica

Sloknuten Peak (72°02′S 4°52′E) A peak, 2,765 m, rising just SW of Slokstallen Mountain in the Mühlig-Hofmann Mountains, Queen Maud Land. Mapped by Norwegian cartographers from surveys and air photos by the Sixth Norwegian Antarctic Expedition (1956–60) and named Sloknuten (the millrace peak).

== See also ==
- List of mountains of Queen Maud Land
