= Sandegga Ridge =

Ridge in Antarctica

Sandegga Ridge (71°54′S 9°43′E) is a ridge extending south for 5 nautical miles (9 km) from Sandho Heights in the Conrad Mountains of the Orvin Mountains, Queen Maud Land. Discovered and photographed by the German Antarctic Expedition, 1938–39. Mapped by Norway from air photos and surveys by Norwegian Antarctic Expedition, 1956–60, and named Sandegga (the sand ridge).
