= Tvibåsen Valley =

Valley in Queen Maud Land, Antarctica

Tvibåsen Valley (71°53′S 5°15′E) is an ice-filled valley whose upper portion divides into two heads, lying between Svarthamaren Mountain and Cumulus Mountain in the Mühlig-Hofmann Mountains of Queen Maud Land. It was mapped from surveys and air photos by the Norwegian Antarctic Expedition (1956–60) and named Tvibåsen ("the double stall").
