= Storsponen Nunatak =

Nunatak in Antarctica

Storsponen Nunatak (72°0′S 3°56′E) is a nunatak on the western side of Hoggestabben Butte, in the Muhlig-Hofmann Mountains of Queen Maud Land. Mapped by Norwegian cartographers from surveys and air photos by the Norwegian Antarctic Expedition (1956–60) and named Storsponen (the big chip).
