= Mount Bjerke =

Mountain in Antarctica

Mount Bjerke (71°58′S 9°43′E) is a large mountain, 2,840 metres (9,320 ft), forming the southern end of the Conrad Mountains in the Orvin Mountains, Queen Maud Land. Discovered and photographed by the German Antarctic Expedition, 1938–39. Mapped by Norway from air photos and surveys by Norwegian Antarctic Expedition, 1956–60, and named for Henry Bjerke, mechanic with Norwegian Antarctic Expedition, 1957–59.

== See also ==
- Henry Moraine
