= Spøta Spur =

Geographical feature in Antarctica

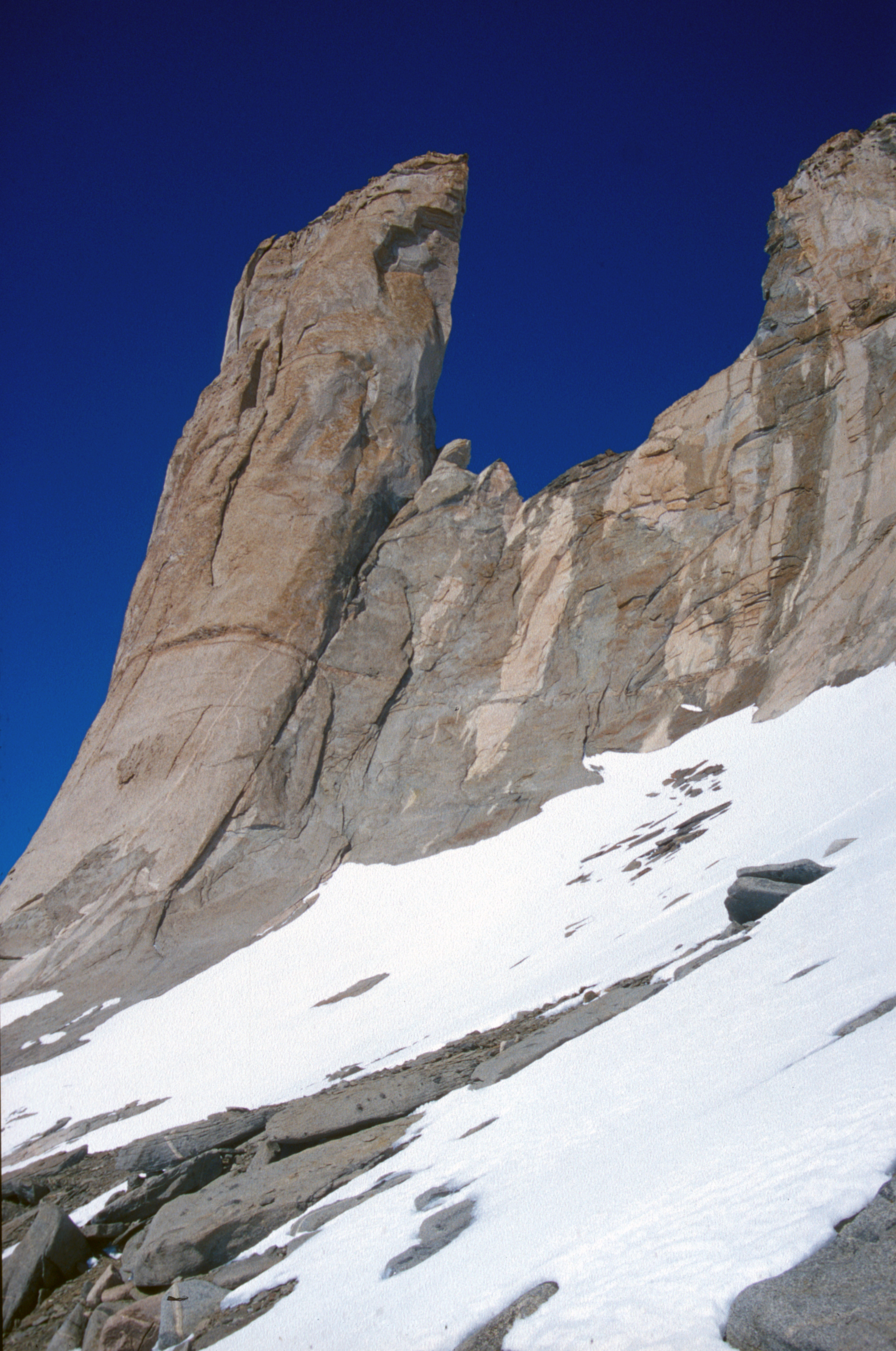
Spøta Spur

Spøta Spur (72°3′S 4°3′E) is a spur extending from the north-central part of Mount Hochlin, in the Muhlig-Hofmann Mountains, Queen Maud Land. Mapped by Norwegian cartographers from surveys and air photos by the Norwegian Antarctic Expedition (1956–60) and named Spøta (the knitting needle).
