= Tønnesen Glacier =

Glacier in Antarctica

- Location of Queen Maud Land in Antarctica

- Location within Antarctica
- Location: Queen Maud Land
- Coordinates: 72°04′S 03°28′E
- Thickness: unknown
- Status: unknown

Tønnesen Glacier (72°4′S 3°28′E) is a broad glacier flowing north between Risemedet Mountain and Festninga Mountain, separating the Gjelsvik Mountains and the Mühlig-Hofmann Mountains in Queen Maud Land. It was mapped by Norwegian cartographers from surveys and air photos by the Norwegian Antarctic Expedition (1956–60) and named for J. Tønnesen, a meteorologist with the expedition.

== See also ==
- List of glaciers in the Antarctic
- Glaciology
