= Tunet Valley =

Valley in Queen Maud Land, Antarctica

Tunet Valley (72°2′S 4°2′E) is a semi-circular ice-filled valley on the north side of Mount Hochlin, in the Muhlig-Hofmann Mountains of Queen Maud Land. Mapped by Norwegian cartographers from surveys and air photos by the Norwegian Antarctic Expedition (1956–60) and named Tunet (the courtyard).
