= Katedralen Canyon =

Katedralen Canyon (71°52′S 6°33′E) is an ice-filled canyon with steep rock cliffs indenting the northwest side of Jøkulkyrkja Mountain, in the Mühlig-Hofmann Mountains of Queen Maud Land, Antarctica. It was plotted from surveys and air photos by the Sixth Norwegian Antarctic Expedition (1956–60) and named Katedralen (the cathedral).
