= Håkon Col =

Mountain pass in Antarctica

Håkon Col (71°54′S 8°52′E) is a col at the south side of the Saether Crags in the Kurze Mountains of Queen Maud Land, Antarctica. It was mapped from surveys and air photos by the Sixth Norwegian Antarctic Expedition (1956–60) and named for Håkon Saether, a medical officer with the expedition (1956–57).
