= Sloket Glacier =

Glacier in Antarctica

Sloket Glacier (71°59′S 4°54′E) is a glacier flowing north between Slokstallen Mountain and Petrellfjellet in the Muhlig-Hofmann Mountains, Queen Maud Land. Mapped by Norwegian cartographers from surveys and air photos by the Norwegian Antarctic Expedition (1956–60) and named Sloket (the millrace).
