= Båsbolken Spur =

Rocky spur in Antarctica

Båsbolken Spur (71°54′S 5°17′E) is a rocky spur near the head of Tvibåsen Valley which divides the upper valley into two equal parts, in the Mühlig-Hofmann Mountains of Queen Maud Land. It was mapped from surveys and from air photos by the Sixth Norwegian Antarctic Expedition (1956–60).
