= Vestvollen Bluff =

Rock and ice bluff in the Muhlig-Hofmann Mountains, Antarctica

Vestvollen Bluff (72°6′S 3°38′E) is a rock and ice bluff forming the west side of Festninga Mountain in the Muhlig-Hofmann Mountains, Queen Maud Land. It was mapped by Norwegian cartographers from surveys and air photos by the Norwegian Antarctic Expedition (1956–60) and named Vestvollen, meaning "the west wall."
