= Sandeggtind Peak =

Mountain in Queen Maud Land, Antarctica

- Location within Antarctica

Highest point
- Elevation: 3,055 metres (10,023 ft)
- Coordinates: 71°52′S 9°45′E

Geography
- Location: Antarctica

Sandeggtind Peak is a 3,055 metres (10,023 ft) tall peak, standing 1.5 km (1 mi) south of Sandho Heights on Sandegga Ridge in the Conrad Mountains, Queen Maud Land. It was discovered and photographed by the Third German Antarctic Expedition (1938–1939), led by Capt. Alfred Ritscher. It was mapped by Norway from air photos and surveys by NorAE, 1956–60, and named Sandeggtind (sand ridge peak).

== See also ==
- List of mountains of Queen Maud Land
