= Huldreskorvene Peaks =

Mountains in Queen Maud Land, Antarctica

The Huldreskorvene Peaks (72°0′S 6°5′E) are a group of summit peaks and crags just north of Skorvehalsen Saddle and west of Tussenobba Peak in the Mühlig-Hofmann Mountains of Queen Maud Land, Antarctica. They were mapped by Norwegian cartographers from surveys and air photos by the Sixth Norwegian Antarctic Expedition (1956–61), and named by the Norwegians.
