= Snønutryggen =

Snønutryggen (72°14′S 5°20′E) is a broad, ice-covered ridge rising southeast of Snønutane Peaks in the Mühlig-Hofmann Mountains of Queen Maud Land. It was mapped by Norwegian cartographers from surveys and air photos by the Norwegian Antarctic Expedition (1956–60) and named Snønutryggen ("the snow peak ridge").
