= Mount Kropotkin =

Mountain in Queen Maud Land, Antarctica

Coordinates: 71°54′S 6°35′E

Mount Kropotkin is a peak on the west side of Jøkulkyrkja Mountain in the Mühlig-Hofmann Mountains of Queen Maud Land, Antarctica. It was mapped by the Norsk Polarinstitutt from surveys and air photos by the Sixth Norwegian Antarctic Expedition, 1956–60. The peak was also mapped by the Soviet Antarctic Expedition in 1961 and named for Russian scientist and anarchist Peter Kropotkin.

== See also ==
- Kropotkin Range, Siberia
