= Sagbladet Ridge =

Sagbladet Ridge (71°47′S 5°51′E) is a rock ridge at the east side of the mouth of the Austreskorve Glacier, in the Muhlig-Hofmann Mountains of Queen Maud Land. Plotted from surveys and air photos by Norwegian Antarctic Expedition (1956–60) and named Sagbladet (the saw blade).
