= Småkovane Cirques =

Cirque in Antarctica

The Småkovane Cirques (71°54′S 5°32′E) are two cirques, separated by a narrow ridge, indenting the northeast side of Breplogen Mountain in the Mühlig-Hofmann Mountains of Queen Maud Land in Antarctica.

They were plotted from surveys and air photos by the Norwegian Antarctic Expedition (1956–1960) and named Småkovane ("the small closets").
