= Skålebrehalsen Terrace =

Skålebrehalsen Terrace (72°16′S 4°10′E) is a high ice-covered terrace at the south side of Skålebreen, in the Mühlig-Hofmann Mountains of Queen Maud Land. It was mapped by Norwegian cartographers from surveys and air photos by the Norwegian Antarctic Expedition (1956–60) and named Skålebrehalsen.
