= Jøkulfallet =

Ice slope in Queen Maud Land, Antarctica

Jøkulfallet (71°51′S 6°42′E) is a steep ice slope on the north side of Jokulkyrkja Mountain in the Mühlig-Hofmann Mountains of Queen Maud Land, Antarctica. It was plotted from surveys and air photos by the Sixth Norwegian Antarctic Expedition (1956–60) and named Jøkulfallet (the glacier fall).
