= Tussebrekka Slope =

Ice slope in Queen Maud Land, Antarctica

Tussebrekka Slope (72°8′S 6°24′E) is a mainly ice-covered slope, about 6 nautical miles (11 km) long, at the southwest side of the head of Lunde Glacier in the Muhlig-Hofmann Mountains, Queen Maud Land. Mapped by Norwegian cartographers from surveys and air photos by the Norwegian Antarctic Expedition (1956–60) and named Tussebrekka (the goblin slope).
