= Kyrkjeskipet Peak =

Mountain in Queen Maud Land, Antarctica

Highest point
- Elevation: 3,085 metres (10,120 ft)
- Coordinates: 71°52′S 6°48′E

Geography
- Location: Antarctica
- Parent range: Mühlig-Hofmann Mountains

Kyrkjeskipet Peak is a peak in Antarctica just north of Kapellet Canyon that dominates the northeastern part of Jøkulkyrkja Mountain in the Mühlig-Hofmann Mountains of Antarctica. It was mapped from surveys and air photos by the Sixth Norwegian Antarctic Expedition (1956–60) and named Kyrkjeskipet (the church nave).

== See also ==
- List of mountains of Queen Maud Land
