= Torbjørn Rocks =

Torbjørn Rocks (71°53′S 6°21′E) is a group of rocks lying in the mouth of Lunde Glacier in the Mühlig-Hofmann Mountains of Queen Maud Land. They were plotted from surveys and air photos by the Norwegian Antarctic Expedition (1956–60) and named for Torbjørn Lunde, the glaciologist with the expedition.
