= Snøtoa Terrace =

Terrace on Mount Grytøyr in Queen Maud Land

Snøtoa Terrace (71°57′S 4°35′E) is a flattish, ice-covered terrace on the northeast side of Mount Grytøyr in the Mühlig-Hofmann Mountains of Queen Maud Land. It was mapped from surveys and air photos by the Norwegian Antarctic Expedition (1956–60) and named Snøtoa ("the snow patch").
