= Luz Range =

Mountain range in Antarctica

Luz Range (72°3′S 4°49′E) is a mountain range 14 nautical miles (26 km) long, including Petrellfjellet, Snobjorga Bluff and associated features, lying next east of the Gablenz Range in the Mühlig-Hofmann Mountains of Queen Maud Land, Antarctica. It was discovered by the Third German Antarctic Expedition under Alfred Ritscher, 1938–39, and named after the commercial director of the German Lufthansa Corporation.
