= Jaren Crags =

- Location within Antarctica

Highest point
- Peak: 2237
- Coordinates: 71°45′S 6°44′E

Geography
- Location: Queen Maud Land, East Antarctica
- Parent range: Storkvarvet Mountain, Mühlig-Hofmann Mountains

The Jaren Crags are a row of rock peaks in the form of a bluff, just west of Storkvarvet Mountain in the Mühlig-Hofmann Mountains of Queen Maud Land, Antarctica. They were plotted from surveys and air photos by the Sixth Norwegian Antarctic Expedition (1956–60) and named Jaren (the edge).
