= Festningsporten Pass =

Coordinates: 72°5′S 3°43′E

Festningsporten Pass is an ice-covered gap in the middle of the north face of Festninga Mountain leading to the mountain's flat summit, in the Mühlig-Hofmann Mountains, Queen Maud Land, Antarctica. it was mapped by Norwegian cartographers from surveys and air photos by the Sixth Norwegian Antarctic Expedition (1956–60) and named Festningsporten (the fortress gate).
