= Stauren Peak =

Mountain in Queen Maud Land, Antarctica

Coordinates: 71°51′S 6°36′E

Stauren Peak is a peak on Staurneset Spur, in the Muhlig-Hofmann Mountains of Queen Maud Land. Plotted from surveys and air photos by the Norwegian Antarctic Expedition (1956–60) and named Stauren (the pole).
