= Skorvebradden =

Ice slope in Queen Maud Land, Antarctica

Skorvebradden (72°7′S 5°33′E) is a heavily crevassed ice slope extending about 13 miles east-southeast from Hamarskorvene Bluff, in the Muhlig-Hofmann Mountains, Queen Maud Land. Mapped by Norwegian cartographers from surveys and air photos by the Norwegian Antarctic Expedition (1956–60) and named Skorvebradden.
