= Tussenobba Peak =

Mountain in Queen Maud Land, Antarctica

Highest point
- Coordinates: 72°0′S 6°16′E

Naming
- Etymology: Tusse is Norsk for Gnome

Tussenobba Peak (72°0′S 6°16′E) is a peak, 2,665 m, rising 6 nautical miles (11 km) northeast of Halsknappane Hills in the east part of the Muhlig-Hofmann Mountains in Queen Maud Land. Mapped by Norwegian cartographers from surveys and air photos by the Norwegian Antarctic Expedition (1956–60) and named Tussenobba.
