= Sprekkefjellet =

Geographical feature in Antarctica

Sprekkefjellet (71°42′S 5°37′E) is an isolated hill in Antarctica, bearing the appearance of two low rock summits separated by a snow col, located 5 nautical miles (9 km) north of the mouth of Austreskorve Glacier and the main mass of the Muhlig-Hofmann Mountains, in Queen Maud Land. Plotted from surveys and air photos by the Norwegian Antarctic Expedition (1956–60) and named Sprekkefjellet (the split hill).
