= Tverrseten Col =

Tverrseten Col (72°1′S 4°46′E) is an ice col between Setenuten Peak and Petrellfjellet in the Muhlig-Hofmann Mountains, Queen Maud Land. Mapped by Norwegian cartographers from surveys and air photos by the Norwegian Antarctic Expedition (1956–60) and named Tverrseten (the transverse seat).
