= Skålebreen =

Glacier in Antarctica

- Location of Queen Maud Land in Antarctica

- Location within Antarctica
- Location: Queen Maud Land; Antarctica
- Coordinates: 72°6′S 3°52′E
- Thickness: unknown
- Terminus: Mühlig-Hofmann Mountains
- Status: unknown

Skålebreen is a glacier flowing north between Festninga Mountain and Mount Hochlin in the Mühlig-Hofmann Mountains in Queen Maud Land. Mapped by Norwegian cartographers from surveys and air photos by the Norwegian Antarctic Expedition (1956–60) and named Skålebreen.

== See also ==
- List of glaciers in the Antarctic
- Glaciology
