= Saether Crags =

Coordinates: 71°52′S 8°54′E

Saether Crags is a high rock crags just south of Steinskaret Gap in the Kurze Mountains of Queen Maud Land. Mapped from surveys and air photos by Norwegian Antarctic Expedition (1956–60) and named for Hakon Saether, medical officer with Norwegian Antarctic Expedition (1956–57).
