= Skavlrimen Ridge =

Skavlrimen Ridge (71°58′S 13°32′E) is a largely snow-covered ridge, about 3 nautical miles (6 km) long and surmounted in the north part by Vyatskaya Peak, located 1.5 nautical miles (2.8 km) east of Dekefjellet Mountain in the Weyprecht Mountains, Queen Maud Land. Discovered and plotted from air photos by German Antarctic Expedition, 1938–39. Replotted from air photos and surveys by Norwegian Antarctic Expedition, 1956–60, and named Skavlrimen.
