= Halsknappane Hills =

Hills in Antarctica

- Location within Antarctica

Highest point
- Peak: 2600
- Coordinates: 72°4′S 6°1′E

Geography
- Location: Queen Maud Land, East Antarctica
- Parent range: Mühlig-Hofmann Mountains

The Halsknappane Hills are a group of low rock hills just west of Skorvehalsen Saddle in the eastern part of the Mühlig-Hofmann Mountains, Queen Maud Land. Antarctica. They were mapped by Norwegian cartographers from surveys and air photos by the Sixth Norwegian Antarctic Expedition (1956–60) and named Halsknappane (the neck buttons).
