= Vyatskaya Peak =

Mountain in Queen Maud Land, Antarctica

Vyatskaya Peak (71°57′S 13°32′E) is a peak, 2,455-metre-high peak located in the northern part of Skavlrimen Ridge in the Weyprecht Mountains, Queen Maud Land. It was discovered and plotted from aerial photographs by the German Antarctic Expedition, 1938–39. It was mapped from aerial photographs and surveys by the Norwegian Antarctic Expedition (1956–1960), then remapped by the Soviet Antarctic Expedition, 1960–61, and presumably named after the Vyatka River. The name originates from the United States and is listed in both the United States Gazetteer and the SCAR Composite Gazetteer of Antarctica.
