= Golubaya Bay =

Bay in Antarctica

Golubaya Bay (69°58′S 9°50′E) is a bay in the southeast extremity of Kamenev Bight, along the ice shelf fringing the coast of Queen Maud Land, Antarctica. The bay was photographed from the air by the Sixth Norwegian Antarctic Expedition in 1958–59 and was mapped from these photos. It was also mapped in 1961 by the Soviet Antarctic Expedition who named it "Bukhta Golubaya" (azure bay).
