= Hålishalsen Saddle =

Hålishalsen Saddle (72°7′S 9°4′E) is an ice saddle between the Kurze Mountains and the interior ice plateau close southward, in Queen Maud Land, Antarctica. It was mapped by Norwegian cartographers from surveys and air photos by the Sixth Norwegian Antarctic Expedition (1956–60) and named Hålishalsen (the slippery ice neck).
