= Helle Slope =

Helle Slope (71°25′S 5°15′E) is a large ice piedmont along the coast of Queen Maud Land, Antarctica, lying east of Jutulstraumen Glacier and north of the Mühlig-Hofmann Mountains. It was photographed from the air by the Third German Antarctic Expedition (1938–39); it was mapped by Norwegian cartographers from surveys and air photos by the Norwegian–British–Swedish Antarctic Expedition (1949–52) and from air photos by the Norwegian expedition (1958–59), and was named for Sigurd Helle, leader of the 1957 Norwegian expedition to Queen Maud Land.
