= Hamarskorvene Bluff =

Coordinates: 72°1′S 5°14′E

Hamarskorvene Bluff is a rock and ice bluff just east of Kvithamaren Cliff in the Mühlig-Hofmann Mountains of Queen Maud Land, Antarctica. It was mapped and named by Norwegian cartographers from surveys and air photos by the Sixth Norwegian Antarctic Expedition (1956–60).

== See also ==
- Skorvebradden
