= Stuttfloget Cliff =

Stuttfloget Cliff (72°3′S 4°30′E) is a steep rock cliff forming the southwest end of Mount Grytoyr in the Muhlig-Hofmann Mountains, Queen Maud Land. Mapped by Norwegian cartographers from surveys and air photos by the Norwegian Antarctic Expedition (1956–60) and named Stuttfloget (the short rock wall).
