= Henry Moraine =

Moraine in Antarctica

Coordinates: 71°57′S 9°38′E

Henry Moraine is a small moraine on the northwest side of Mount Bjerke in the Conrad Mountains of Queen Maud Land, Antarctica. It was mapped by Norway from air photos and surveys by the Sixth Norwegian Antarctic Expedition, 1956–60, and named for Henry Bjerke, a mechanic with the expedition, 1957–59.
