= Otter Plain =

Ice plain in Antarctica

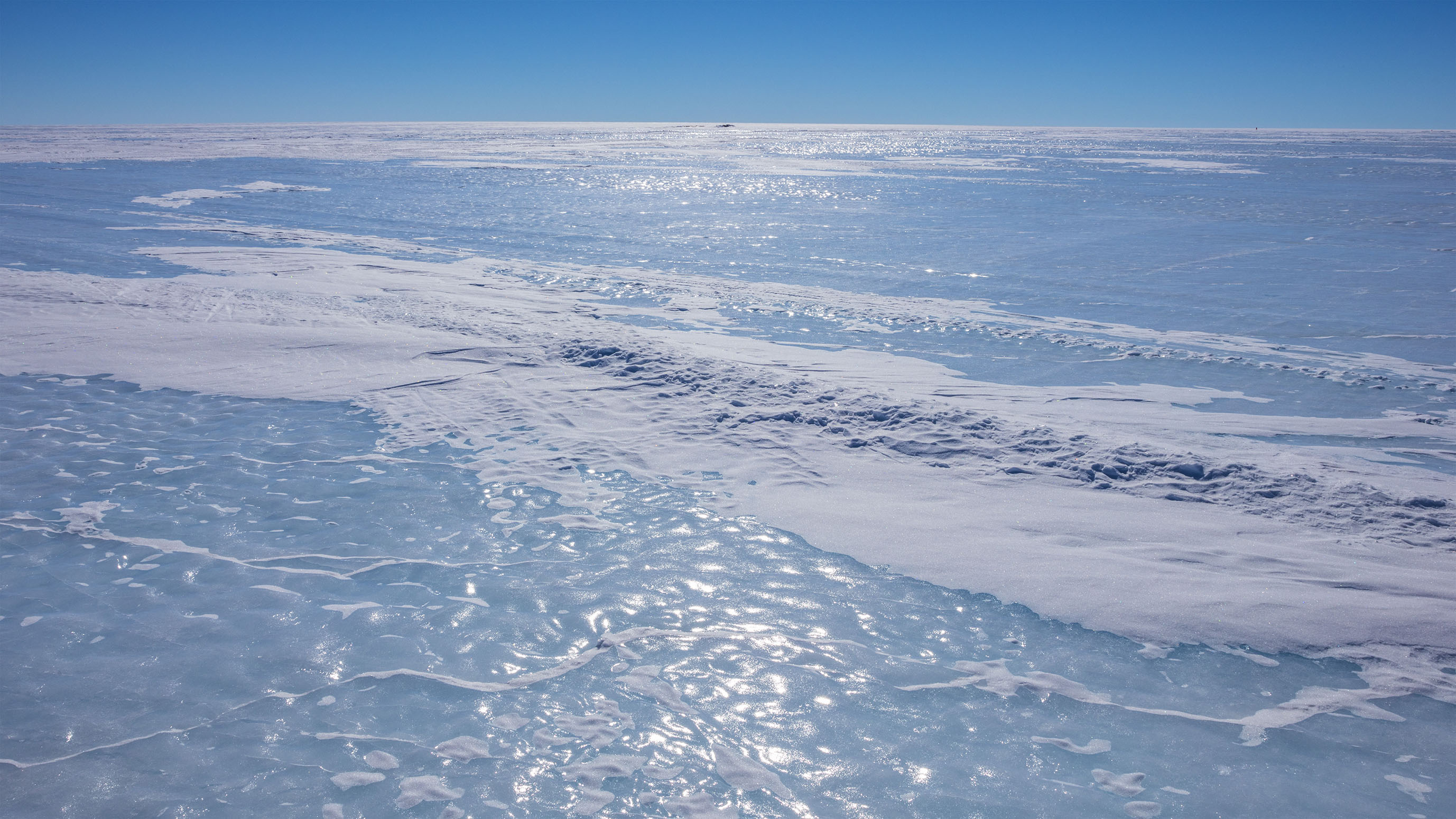
Otter Plain (looking NE) with Sigurd Knolls in the center near the horizon, roughly 27 miles (44 km) in the distance. Queen Maud Land, Antarctica.

Otter Plain (71°30′S 7°30′E) is an ice plain between Sigurd Knolls on the north and the Muhlig-Hofmann and Drygalski Mountains on the south, in Queen Maud Land. Plotted from surveys and air photos by the Norwegian Antarctic Expedition (1956–60) and named after the Otter aircraft used by the expedition.
