= Kaye Crest =

Ridge in Antarctica

Kaye Crest (72°6′S 4°24′E) is a ridge lying between the Preuschoff Range and the Gablenz Range in the Mühlig-Hofmann Mountains of Queen Maud Land, Antarctica. The name "Kaye-Kamm" was given to a linear elevation in this vicinity by the Third German Antarctic Expedition under Alfred Ritscher, 1938–39. The correlation of the name with this feature may be arbitrary but is recommended for the sake of international uniformity and historical continuity.
