= Styggebrekkufsa Bluff =

Styggebrekkufsa Bluff (71°55′S 5°53′E) is a bluff overlooking the cast-central part of Austreskorve Glacier in the Muhlig-Hofmann Mountains of Queen Maud Land. Plotted from surveys and air photos by the Norwegian Antarctic Expedition (1956–60) and named Styggebrekkufsa (the dangerous-slope bluff).
