= Kvithamaren Cliff =

Cliff in Antarctica

Kvithamaren Cliff (71°59′S 5°2′E) is a cliff just east of Slokstallen Mountain in the Mühlig-Hofmann Mountains of Queen Maud Land, Antarctica. It was mapped by Norwegian cartographers from surveys and air photos by the Sixth Norwegian Antarctic Expedition (1956–60) and named Kvithamaren (the white hammer or crag).
