= Snuggerud Glacier =

Glacier in Antarctica

- Location of Queen Maud Land in Antarctica

- Location within Antarctica
- Type: cirque
- Location: Queen Maud Land
- Coordinates: 72°7′S 7°52′E
- Thickness: unknown
- Terminus: Filchner Mountains
- Status: unknown

Snuggerud Glacier (72°7′S 7°52′E) is a glacier flowing north-northeast between Klevekapa Mountain and Smaknoltane Peaks in the Filchner Mountains of Queen Maud Land. Mapped by Norwegian cartographers from surveys and air photos by the Norwegian Antarctic Expedition (1956–60), and named for J. Snuggerud, radio mechanic with Norwegian Antarctic Expedition (1956–58).

== See also ==
- Djupedalsleitet Saddle
- List of glaciers in the Antarctic
- Glaciology
