= Gablenz =

Gablenz may refer to:

== People ==
- Ludwig von Gablenz (1814–1874), Austrian general
- Eccard Freiherr von Gablenz (1891–1978), German general

== Places ==
- Chemnitz-Gablenz, Saxony
- Gablenz, Brandenburg
- Gablenz, Saxony
- Gablenz Range, Antarctica
