= Setenuten Peak =

Mountain in Queen Maud Land, Antarctica

Setenuten Peak (72°3′S 4°45′E) (seat peak) is a rocky peak one nautical mile (1.9 km) south of Petrellfjellet in the Muhlig-Hofmann Mountains, Queen Maud Land. Its elevation is 2,745 m. It was mapped by Norwegian cartographers from surveys and air photos by the Norwegian Antarctic Expedition (1956–60), and it is named because of its shape.
