= Gagarin Mountains =

Mountain range in Antarctica

- Location within Antarctica

Naming
- Native name: Khrebet Yuriya Gagarina (Russian)

Geography
- Continent: Antarctica
- Region: Queen Maud Land, East Antarctica
- Range coordinates: 71°57′S 09°23′E
- Parent range: Fimbulheimen

The Gagarin Mountains (Russian: Khrebet Yuriya Gagarina; Norwegian: Kurzefjella) are a linear group of mountains, trending in a north–south direction for 10 miles (16 km) between the Kurze Mountains and the Conrad Mountains of the Orvin Mountains in Queen Maud Land, East Antarctica.

== Discovery and naming ==
The Gagarin Mountains were mapped by cartographers of the Norwegian Polar Institute, using aerial photographs and surveys taken by the Sixth Norwegian Antarctic Expedition in 1956–60. They were remapped from surveys and air photos by the Soviet Antarctic Expedition, 1960–61, and named for Soviet cosmonaut Yuri Gagarin.

== See also ==
- List of mountains of Queen Maud Land
