= Skigarden Ridge =

- Location within Antarctica

Highest point
- Elevation: 2,086 m (6,844 ft)

Geography
- Parent range: Gablenz Range

Skigarden Ridge (71°54′S 4°32′E) is a ridge with several conspicuous peaks, about 2 nautical miles (3.7 km) northeast of Mount Grytoyr in the Muhlig-Hofmann Mountains of Queen Maud Land. Mapped from surveys and air photos by the Norwegian Antarctic Expedition (1956–60) and named Skigarden (the rail fence).

The Bjørn Spur extends northeastward from Skigarden Ridge.
