= Stuttflog Glacier =

Glacier in Antarctica

- Location of Queen Maud Land in Antarctica

- Location within Antarctica
- Location: Queen Maud Land
- Coordinates: 71°56′S 4°45′E
- Thickness: unknown
- Terminus: Mühlig-Hofmann Mountains
- Status: unknown

Stuttflog Glacier (71°56′S 4°45′E) is a glacier flowing north between Mount Grytoyr and Mount Pertrellfjellet in the Muhlig-Hofmann Mountains, Queen Maud Land, Antarctica. Mapped by Norwegian cartographers from surveys and air photos by the Norwegian Antarctic Expedition (1956–60) and named Stuttflogbreen (short rock wall glacier).

== See also ==
- List of glaciers in the Antarctic
- Glaciology
