= Hamarøya Mountain =

Mountain in Antarctica

Hamarøya Mountain (71°56′S 4°57′E) is an isolated ice-free mountain in the middle of the mouth of Vestreskorve Glacier in the Mühlig-Hofmann Mountains of Queen Maud Land, Antarctica. It was mapped from surveys and air photos by the Sixth Norwegian Antarctic Expedition (1956–60) and named Hamarøya (the hammer island).
