= Bjørn Spur =

Landform in Antarctica

Bjørn Spur (71°55′S 4°39′E) is a rock spur which extends northeastward from Skigarden Ridge in the Muhlig-Hofmann Mountains of Queen Maud Land. It was mapped from surveys and from air photos by the Sixth Norwegian Antarctic Expedition, 1956–60, (NorAE) and named for Bjørn Grytøyr, scientific assistant with NorAE (1956–58).
