= Vinten-Johansen Ridge =

Rock ridge in Queen Maud Land, Antarctica

Vinten-Johansen Ridge (71°49′S 8°58′E) is a high, bare rock ridge in the north-central part of the Kurze Mountains of Queen Maud Land. Mapped from surveys and air photos by Norwegian Antarctic Expedition (1956–60) and named for A. Vinten-Johansen, medical officer with Norwegian Antarctic Expedition (1957–58).
