= Småknoltane Peaks =

Mountain in Queen Maud Land, Antarctica

Småknoltane Peaks (72°7′S 8°3′E) is a chain of peaks 4 nautical miles (7.4 km) long, rising on the east side of the mouth of Snuggerud Glacier in the Filchner Mountains of Queen Maud Land. They were photographed from the air by the German Antarctic Expedition (1938–39) and mapped by Norwegian cartographers from surveys and air photos by the Norwegian Antarctic Expedition (1956–60), and named Småknoltane ("the small knolls").
