= Klevekåpa Mountain =

Mountain in Queen Maud Land, Antarctica

Klevekåpa Mountain (72°2′S 7°37′E) is an icecapped mountain, 2,910 metres (9,550 ft) high, with an abrupt southeast rock face, standing close northwest of the mouth of Snuggerud Glacier in the Filchner Mountains of Queen Maud Land, Antarctica. It was mapped by Norwegian cartographers from surveys and air photos by the Sixth Norwegian Antarctic Expedition (1956–60) and named Klevekåpa (the closet cloak).
