= Holtedahl Peaks =

Mountains in Antarctica

The Holtedahl Peaks (71°47′S 8°58′E) are a group of peaks and ridges lying northward of Steinskaret Gap and forming the northern portion of the Kurze Mountains, in Queen Maud Land, Antarctica. The name "Holtedahlfjella" was applied to the entire extent of the Kurze Mountains on a Norsk Polarinstitutt map of 1966, but the name Kurze has priority, having been given by the Third German Antarctic Expedition under Alfred Ritscher, 1938–39. For the sake of historical continuity, Kurze Mountains has been retained as applied by Ritscher; the name Holtedahl Peaks is recommended for the elevations northward of Steinskaret Gap in these mountains. The name is for Professor Olaf Holtedahl, a noted Norwegian geologist who worked in the South Shetland Islands and the Palmer Archipelago area in 1927–28.
