= Kapellet Canyon =

Geographical feature in Antarctica

Coordinates: 71°53′S 6°47′E

Kapellet Canyon is a canyon with steep rock and ice walls indenting the eastern side of Jøkulkyrkja Mountain, in the Mühlig-Hofmann Mountains of Queen Maud Land. It was plotted from surveys and aerial photographs by the Sixth Norwegian Antarctic Expedition (1956–60) and named Kapellet (the chapel).

== See also ==
- History of Antarctica
- List of Antarctic expeditions
