= Grinda Ridge =

Mountain ridge in Antarctica

Grinda Ridge (71°56′S 4°26′E) is a rock ridge 1.5 nautical miles (3 km) long, immediately north of Mount Grytoyr in the Mühlig-Hofmann Mountains of Queen Maud Land, Antarctica. It was mapped from surveys and air photos by the Sixth Norwegian Antarctic Expedition (1956–60) and named Grinda (the gate).
