= Cape Krasinskiy =

Cape Krasinskiy (69°50′S 8°30′E) is a projecting angle of the ice shelf fringing the coast of Queen Maud Land, Antarctica, separating Dublitskiy Bay and Kamenev Bight. The feature was photographed from the air by the Sixth Norwegian Antarctic Expedition in 1958–59 and was mapped from these photos. It was also mapped in 1961 by the Soviet Antarctic Expedition who named it for G.D. Krasinskiy a polar investigator and organizer of air expeditions.
