= Gruvletindane Crags =

The Gruvletindane Crags (71°44′S 8°59′E) are rock crags, rising to 2,255 metres (7,400 ft) and forming the north end of the Kurze Mountains of Queen Maud Land, Antarctica. They were mapped from surveys and air photos by the Sixth Norwegian Antarctic Expedition (1956–60) and named Gruvletindane. The feature is bounded on the western side by a large and prominent glacial moraine.

== See also ==
- Gruvleflesa Knolls
