= Sigurd Helle =

Norwegian topographer and explorer (1920–2013)

- Born: 6 September 1920; Hylestad Municipality, Norway
- Died: 21 April 2013 (aged 92)
- Education: University of Oslo
- Occupations: Topographer and explorer
- Employer: Norwegian Polar Institute
- Awards: King's Medal of Merit in gold (1989)

Sigurd Gunnarson Helle (6 September 1920 – 21 April 2013) was a Norwegian topographer and explorer. He led the Sixth Norwegian Antarctic Expedition 1956–1960.

== Biography ==
Born in Hylestad Municipality on 6 September 1920, Helle graduated from the University of Oslo with the cand.mag. degree in 1948. He was a research assistant for Carl Størmer, and was hired as a geodesist at the Norwegian Polar Institute in 1949. He did field work at Jan Mayen and Svalbard, but is best known for leading the Sixth Norwegian Antarctic Expedition to Queen Maud Land in 1956–1960. He retired in 1987.

Helle was awarded the King's Medal of Merit in gold in 1989. He died on 21 April 2013.

The Helle Slope and the Sigurd Knolls in Antarctica are named for him. Hellefonna, a glaciated area in Sabine Land at Spitsbergen, is also named after Helle.
