= Gruvleflesa Knolls =

The Gruvleflesa Knolls (71°44′S 8°50′E) are two low rock knolls rising above the Antarctic glacial moraine west of the Gruvletindane Crags, in the Kurze Mountains of Queen Maud Land. They were mapped from surveys and air photos by the Sixth Norwegian Antarctic Expedition (1956–1960) and named Gruvleflesa.
