= Kazanskaya Mountain =

Mountain in Queen Maud Land, Antarctica

Kazanskaya Mountain (71°58′S 13°15′E) is a mountain, 2,690 metres (8,830 ft) high, forming the northern end of Snøskalkegga Ridge in the Weyprecht Mountains of Queen Maud Land, Antarctica. It was discovered and plotted from air photos by the Third German Antarctic Expedition, 1938–39, and was mapped from air photos and surveys by the Sixth Norwegian Antarctic Expedition, 1956–60. It was remapped by the Soviet Antarctic Expedition, 1960–61, and possibly named after the Russian city of Kazan.
