= Hoggestabben Butte =

Prominent butte in Antarctica

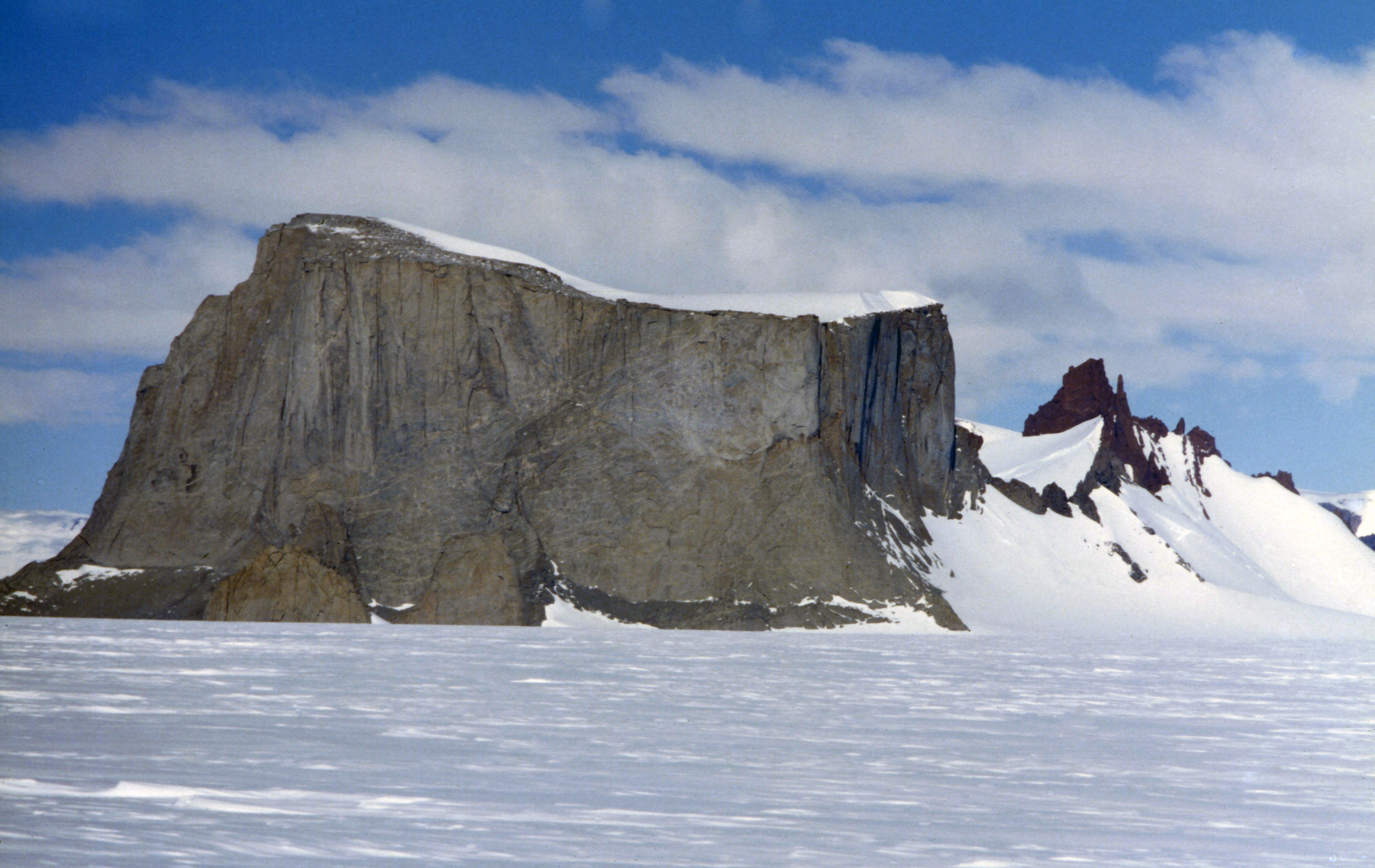
Hoggestabben Butte, view in southeast direction

Hoggestabben Butte (72°0′S 3°58′E) is a prominent butte, 2,410 metres (7,900 ft) high, standing 3 nautical miles (6 km) north of Mount Hochlin and being its highest northern outlier, in the Mühlig-Hofmann Mountains of Queen Maud Land, Antarctica. It was mapped by Norwegian cartographers from surveys and air photos by the Sixth Norwegian Antarctic Expedition (1956–60) and named Hoggestabben (the chopping block).
