= Skorvehalsen Saddle =

Ice saddle

Skorvehalsen Saddle (72°4′S 6°11′E) is an ice saddle immediately south of Huldreskorvene Peaks in the Muhlig-Hofmann Mountains, Queen Maud Land. Mapped by Norwegian cartographers from surveys and air photos by the Norwegian Antarctic Expedition (1956–60) and named Skorvehalsen.
