= Snønutane Peaks =

Mountains in Queen Maud Land, Antarctica

Coordinates: 72°5′S 4°48′E

Snønutane Peaks is a group of rock peaks rising above the elevated snow surface just east of Snøbjørga Bluff, in the Mühlig-Hofmann Mountains of Queen Maud Land. Mapped by Norwegian cartographers from surveys and air photos by the Norwegian Antarctic Expedition (1956–60) and named Snønutane ("the snow peaks").
