= Håhellerskarvet =

Mountain in Antarctica

- Location within Antarctica

Highest point
- Elevation: 2,910 metres (9,550 ft)
- Coordinates: 71°57′S 6°8′E

Geography
- Location: Queen Maud Land, East Antarctica
- Parent range: Mühlig-Hofmann Mountains

Håhellerskarvet, meaning "shark cave mountain" in Norwegian, is a 2,910 metres (9,550 ft) high partially ice-covered mountain between Austreskorve Glacier and Lunde Glacier in the Mühlig-Hofmann Mountains of Queen Maud Land, East Antarctica. Other nearby geographic features include Håhelleren Cove, indenting the north side of Håhellerskarvet, Håhelleregga Ridge, an irregular rock ridge just north of Håhellerskarvet, Håhellerbotnen Cirque, a large cirque on the east side of Håhelleregga Ridge, and Jøkulkyrkja, a broad, ice-topped mountain located east of Lunde Glacier. All of these geographic features were plotted from surveys and air photos by the Sixth Norwegian Antarctic Expedition (1956–60).
