= Storkvarvet Mountain =

Mountain in Queen Maud Land, Antarctica

Coordinates: 71°45′S 6°54′E

Storkvarvet Mountain is a mountain in Antarctica that is round in plan and has several radial spurs, standing N of Habermehl Peak at the NE end of the Muhlig-Hofmann Mountains, Queen Maud Land.

== Discovery and naming ==
Storkvarvet Mountain was photographed from the air by the Third German Antarctic Expedition (1938–1939), led by Capt. Alfred Ritscher. Plotted from surveys and air photos by the Sixth Norwegian Antarctic Expedition (1956–60) and named Storkvarvet (the big round of logs).

== See also ==
- List of mountains of Queen Maud Land
