= Djupedalsleitet Saddle =

Djupedalsleitet Saddle (72°5′S 7°22′E) is an ice saddle between the head of Djupedalen Valley and Snuggerud Glacier, south of the Filchner Mountains in Queen Maud Land. It was mapped and name by Norwegian cartographers from surveys and air photos by the Sixth Norwegian Antarctic Expedition (1956–60).
