= Hädrich =

Hädrich may refer to:

== Places ==
- Mount Hädrich, mountain of Queen Maud Land

== People ==
- Rolf Hädrich (1931–2000), German film director and screenwriter
