= Austvollen Bluff =

Austvollen Bluff (72°6′S 3°48′E) is a steep rock bluff forming the east side of Festninga Mountain in the Mühlig-Hofmann Mountains, Queen Maud Land. It was mapped by Norwegian cartographers from surveys and from air photos by the Sixth Norwegian Antarctic Expedition (1956–60) and named "Austvollen" (the "east wall").
