= Larsen Cliffs =

Cliffs in Antarctica

The Larsen Cliffs (71°56′S 6°53′E) are steep rock and ice cliffs which form a part of the east face of Jøkulkyrkja Mountain, in the Mühlig-Hofmann Mountains of Queen Maud Land, Antarctica. They were plotted from surveys and air photos by the Sixth Norwegian Antarctic Expedition (1956–60) and named for Per Larsen, a steward with the expedition (1956–57).
