= Preuschoff Range =

Mountain range

Preuschoff Range (72°4′S 4°3′E) is a mountain range consisting of Mount Hochlin and associated features, lying just west of Kaye Crest in the Mühlig-Hofmann Mountains of Queen Maud Land. The name Preuschoffrücken was applied in the general area by the Third German Antarctic Expedition (1938–1939), led by Capt. Alfred Ritscher, for Franz Preuschoff, engineer on the flying boat name with this feature may be arbitrary but is recommended for the sake of international uniformity and historical continuity.
