= Dekefjellet Mountain =

Mountain in Antarctica

Dekefjellet Mountain (71°58′S 13°25′E) is an elongated mountain, about 3 nautical miles (6 km) long and surmounted by Kamskaya Peak, standing 1.5 nautical miles (3 km) west of Skavlrimen Ridge in the Weyprecht Mountains, Queen Maud Land. The feature is partly rock and partly covered with snow. It was discovered and plotted from air photos by the Third German Antarctic Expedition, 1938–39. The mountain was replotted from air photos and surveys by the Sixth Norwegian Antarctic Expedition, 1956–60, and named Dekefjellet.
