= Mount Hädrich =

Mountain in Antarctica

Mount Hädrich (71°57′S 6°12′E) is a peak, 2,885 metres (9,470 ft) high, which rises from the eastern part of Håhellerskarvet in the Mühlig-Hofmann Mountains of Queen Maud Land, Antarctica. The name "Hädrichberg", after the procurator of the former German Lufthansa Corporation, was applied in this area by the Third German Antarctic Expedition (1938–39) under Alfred Ritscher. The correlation of the name with this peak may be arbitrary but is recommended for the sake of international uniformity and historical continuity.
