= Svarthamaren Mountain =

Mountain of Antarctica

Coordinates: 71°54′33″S 5°11′01″E

Location in Antarctica

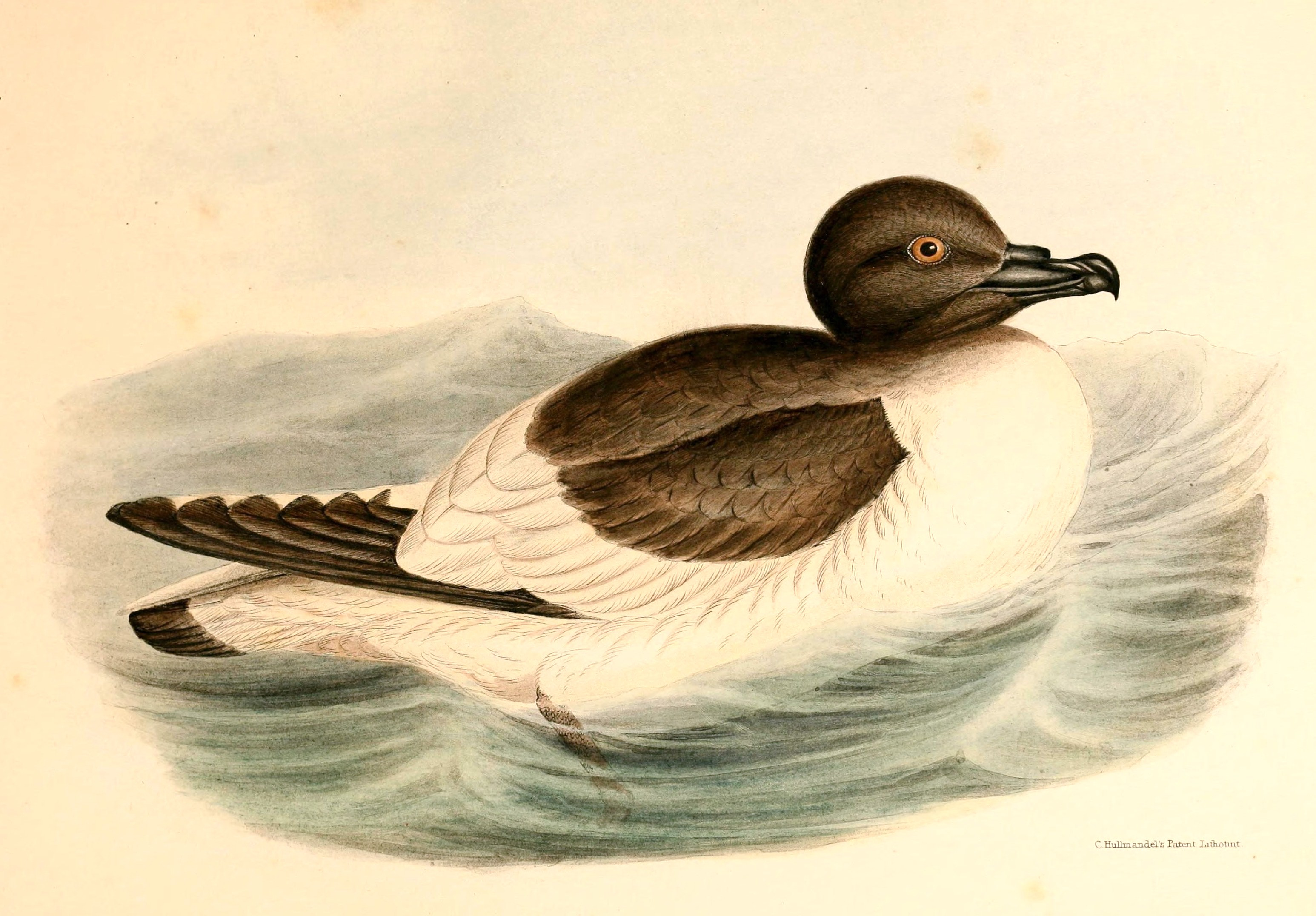
The mountain holds the largest known breeding colony of Antarctic petrels

Svarthamaren Mountain is a prominent ice-free mountain or large nunatak on the east side of the mouth of Vestreskorve Glacier in the Muhlig-Hofmann Mountains of Queen Maud Land, Antarctica. It was mapped from surveys and aerial photographs by the Norwegian Antarctic Expedition (1956–60) and named Svarthamaren ("black cliff").

== Birds ==
The nunatak supports the largest known seabird colony in Antarctica. Over 250,000 pairs of Antarctic petrels nest there annually, with about 500,000 non-breeding birds also present during the breeding season. Other birds breeding at the site include snow petrels (up to 1000 pairs) and south polar skuas (about 80 pairs). The site is protected under the Antarctic Treaty System as Antarctic Specially Protected Area (ASPA) No.142. The 751 ha site, covering an altitude range of 1600–2100 m, has also been designated an Important Bird Area (IBA) by BirdLife International because of its seabird colonies. During the 2021/2022 breeding season in December and January, extreme snow storm activity led to an almost complete absence of breeding Antarctic petrels, snow petrels and south polar skuas in Svarthamaren Mountain (71° 54’S, 5° 10’ E) and Jutulsessen (72° 3’S, 2°40’E), two of the world's largest Antarctic petrel colonies.
