= Langfloget Cliff =

Antarctican rock cliff

Langfloget Cliff (72°6′S 4°24′E) is a rock cliff 6 nautical miles (11 km) long at the west side of Flogeken Glacier, in the Mühlig-Hofmann Mountains of Queen Maud Land, Antarctica. It was mapped by Norwegian cartographers from surveys and air photos by the Sixth Norwegian Antarctic Expedition (1956–60) and named Langfloget (the long rock wall).
