= Snøbjørga Bluff =

Cliff in Antarctica

Snøbjørga Bluff (72°5′S 4°39′E) is a rock and ice bluff at the east side of the head of Stuttflog Glacier, in the Mühlig-Hofmann Mountains of Queen Maud Land. It was mapped by Norwegian cartographers from surveys and air photos by the Norwegian Antarctic Expedition (1956–60) and named Snøbjørga ("the snow mountain").
