= Gessner Peak =

Mountain in Queen Maud Land, Antarctica

- Location within Antarctica

Highest point
- Elevation: 3,020 ft (920 m)
- Coordinates: 71°46′S 6°55′E)

Geography
- Location: Mühlig-Hofmann Mountains of Queen Maud Land, Antarctica

Gessner Peak (German: Geßnerspitze, is, at 3,020 metres (9,900 ft), the highest peak of Storkvarvet Mountain, standing 3 nautical miles (6 km) north of Habermehl Peak in the northeast part of the Mühlig-Hofmann Mountains of Queen Maud Land, Antarctica. It was discovered by the Third German Antarctic Expedition (1938–1939), led by Captain Alfred Ritscher, and named for the manager of the German Hansa-Luftbild, an aerial photographic corporation.

== See also ==
- List of mountains of Queen Maud Land
