= Gablenz Range =

Mountain range in Antarctica

The Gablenz Range (72°0′S 4°30′E) is a mountain range, 13 nautical miles (24 km) long, including Skigarden Ridge, Mount Grytoyr and associated features. The range lies between the northern part of the Preuschoff Range and the Luz Range in the Mühlig-Hofmann Mountains of Queen Maud Land, Antarctica. It was discovered by the Third German Antarctic Expedition under Alfred Ritscher, 1938–39, and was named after the director of the German Lufthansa Corporation.
