= Brokke =

Village in Valle Municipality, Norway

- Village
- Interactive map of Brokke
- Coordinates: 59.1079°N 07.4886°E
- Country: Norway
- Region: Southern Norway
- County: Agder
- District: Setesdal
- Municipality: Valle Municipality
- Elevation: 454 m (1,490 ft)
- Time zone: UTC+01:00 (CET)
  - Summer (DST): UTC+02:00 (CEST)
- Post Code: 4748 Rysstad

Brokke is a village in Valle Municipality in Agder county, Norway. The village is located in the Setesdal valley, about 1 kilometre (0.62 mi) west of the river Otra. The village of Hovet lies about 1.5 kilometres (0.93 mi) to the east of Brokke, the village of Rysstad lies about 3 kilometres (1.9 mi) to the southeast, and the village of Uppstad lies about 4 kilometres (2.5 mi) to the north. The Brokke Alpine Ski Centre is located just west of the village.
