= Flogeken Glacier =

Glacier in Antarctica

- Location of Queen Maud Land in Antarctica

- Location within Antarctica
- Type: deeply entrenched
- Location: Queen Maud Land
- Coordinates: 72°4′S 4°25′E
- Thickness: unknown
- Terminus: Mühlig-Hofmann Mountains
- Status: unknown

Flogeken Glacier (72°4′S 4°25′E) is a deeply entrenched glacier, flowing northwest between Mount Grytoyr and Langfloget Cliff, in the Mühlig-Hofmann Mountains of Queen Maud Land, Antarctica. it was mapped by Norwegian cartographers from surveys and air photos by the Sixth Norwegian Antarctic Expedition (1956–60) and named Flogeken (the rock wall spoke).

== See also ==
- List of glaciers in the Antarctic
- Glaciology
