= Djupedalen Valley =

Valley in Antarctica

Djupedalen Valley (71°58′S 7°6′E) is a glacier-filled valley separating the Mühlig-Hofmann Mountains and the Filchner Mountains in Queen Maud Land. It was plotted from surveys and air photos by the Sixth Norwegian Antarctic Expedition (1956–60) and named Djupedalen (the deep valley).

== See also ==
- Djupedalsleitet Saddle
