= Høgsenga Crags =

- Location within Antarctica

Highest point
- Peak: 2397
- Coordinates: 71°53′S 5°23′E

Geography
- Location: Queen Maud Land, East Antarctica
- Parent range: Breplogen Mountain, Mühlig-Hofmann Mountains

The Høgsenga Crags are high rock crags which form the northern extremity of Breplogen Mountain in the Mühlig-Hofmann Mountains of Queen Maud Land, Antarctica. They were mapped from surveys and air photos by the Sixth Norwegian Antarctic Expedition (1956–60) and named Høgsenga (the high bed).
