= Kamenev Bight =

Bay in Antarctica

Kamenev Bight (69°55′S 9°30′E) is a shallow embayment about 25 nautical miles (50 km) wide in the ice shelf fringing the coast of Queen Maud Land, Antarctica. Cape Krasinskiy, an ice cape, marks the western end of the bight which lies 60 nautical miles (110 km) northwest of the Schirmacher Hills. The bight was photographed from the air by the Sixth Norwegian Antarctic Expedition in 1958–59 and was mapped from these photos. It was also mapped in 1961 by the Soviet Antarctic Expedition who named it for S.S. Kamenev, an organizer of Arctic expeditions.

== See also ==
- Golubaya Bay
