= Kuml =

Nunatak in Antarctica

Coordinates: 71°59′00″S 16°39′00″E

- Location within Antarctica

Kuml is a small nunatak in Queen Maud Land, East Antarctica between the Vorposten Peak and Sarkofagen Mountain, in the east Fimbulheimen. "Kuml" is a descriptive name literally meaning "grave mound".
