= Besteland =

Village in Valle Municipality, Norway

- Village
- Interactive map of Besteland
- Coordinates: 59.0344°N 07.5529°E
- Country: Norway
- Region: Southern Norway
- County: Agder
- District: Setesdal
- Municipality: Valle Municipality
- Elevation: 238 m (781 ft)
- Time zone: UTC+01:00 (CET)
  - Summer (DST): UTC+02:00 (CEST)
- Post Code: 4748 Rysstad

Besteland is a village in Valle Municipality in Agder county, Norway. The village is located along the river Otra in the Setesdal valley, about 7 kilometres (4.3 mi) south of the village of Rysstad. The Norwegian National Road 9 runs through the village.
