= Sigurd Knolls =

Rock knolls in Queen Maud Land, Antarctica

Sigurd Knolls (71°21′S 7°38′E) is an isolated rock knolls at the north end of Otter Plain, about 20 miles (32 km) northwest of Drygalski Mountains in Queen Maud Land, Antarctica. It was plotted from surveys and air photos by the Norwegian Antarctic Expedition (1956–60) and named for Sigurd Helle, geodesist and leader of that expedition.
