= Steinskaret Gap =

Mountain pass of Queen Maud Land

Coordinates: 71°51′S 8°57′E

Steinskaret Gap is an ice-filled gap in the central Kurze Mountains, just south of Steinskaregga Ridge. Mapped from surveys and air photos by Norwegian Antarctic Expedition (1956–60) and named Steinskaret (the stone gap).
