= Cumulus Mountain =

Mountain in Antarctica

Cumulus Mountain (71°51′S 5°23′E) is a mountain, 2,335 metres (7,660 ft) high, immediately north of the Hogsenga Crags in the Mühlig-Hofmann Mountains of Queen Maud Land. It was mapped from surveys and air photos by the Sixth Norwegian Antarctic Expedition (1956–60) and named Cumulusfjellet (Cumulus Mountain).
