= Sørensen Nunataks =

Sørensen Nunataks (71°41′S 7°57′E) is a group of about 15 nunataks extending about 6 nautical miles (11 km), forming the northwest part of the Drygalski Mountains in Queen Maud Land. They were first plotted from air photos by the German Antarctic Expedition of 1938–39. They were mapped from surveys and air photos by the Norwegian Antarctic Expedition (1956–60) and named after Stein Sørensen, a radio operator with the expedition from 1956 to 1958.
