= Hovet, Agder =

Village in Valle Municipality, Norway

Hovet
- Village
- Interactive map of Hovet
- Coordinates: 59.1081°N 07.5190°E
- Country: Norway
- Region: Southern Norway
- County: Agder
- District: Setesdal
- Municipality: Valle Municipality
- Elevation: 250 m (820 ft)
- Time zone: UTC+01:00 (CET)
  - Summer (DST): UTC+02:00 (CEST)
- Post Code: 4748 Rysstad

Hovet is a village in Valle Municipality in Agder county, Norway. The village is located just east of the river Otra, about 3 kilometres (1.9 mi) north of the village of Rysstad and about 1.5 kilometres (0.93 mi) east of the village of Brokke. There is a bridge over the river Otra at Hovet which connects to the Norwegian National Road 9 highway which runs along the west side of the highway.
