= Rysstad =

Village in Valle Municipality, Norway

- Village
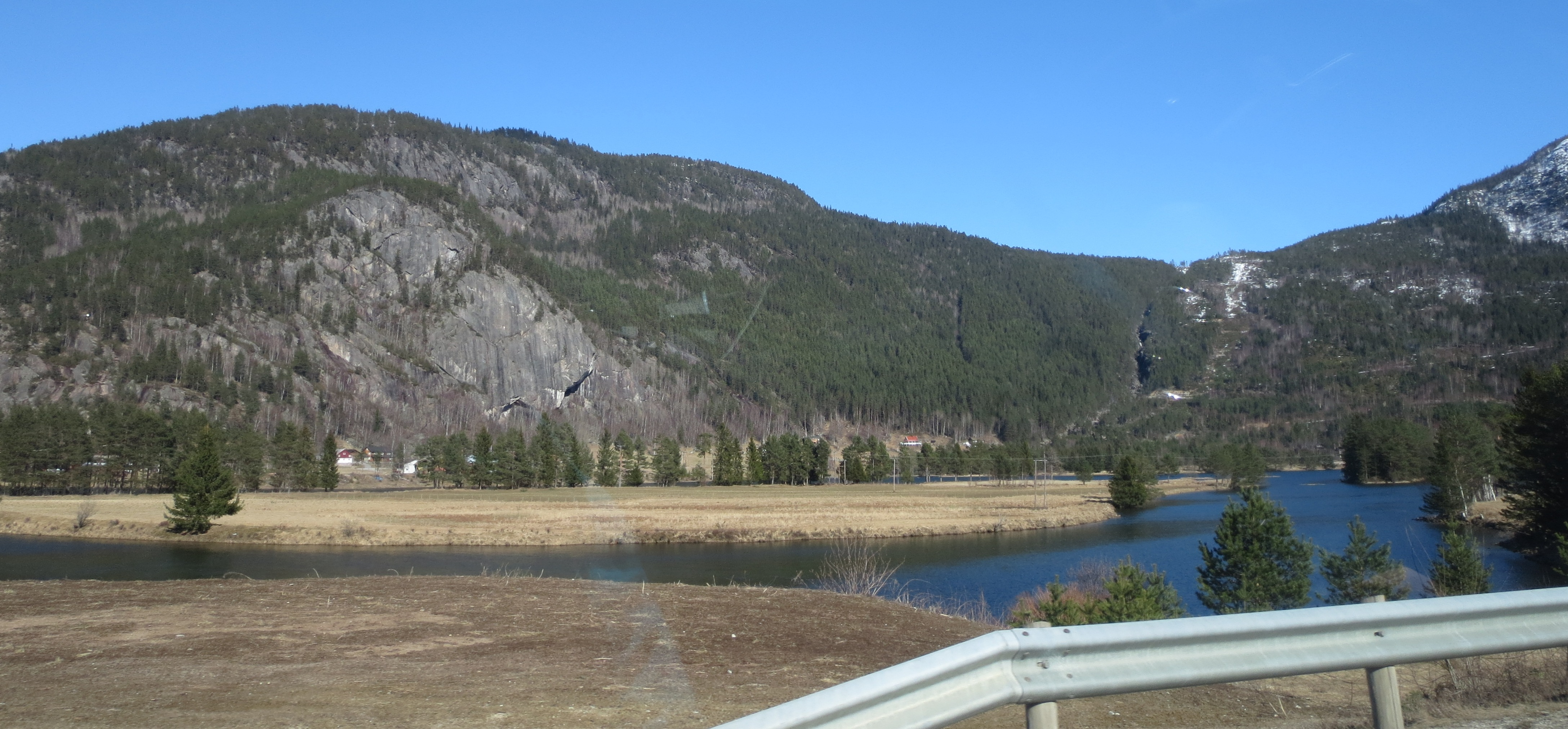
- View of the village area
- Interactive map of Rysstad
- Coordinates: 59.0935°N 07.5359°E
- Country: Norway
- Region: Southern Norway
- County: Agder
- District: Setesdal
- Municipality: Valle Municipality
- Elevation: 253 m (830 ft)
- Time zone: UTC+01:00 (CET)
  - Summer (DST): UTC+02:00 (CEST)
- Post Code: 4748 Rysstad

Rysstad is a village in Valle Municipality in Agder county, Norway. The village is located along the river Otra in the Setesdal valley. The Norwegian National Road 9 runs through the village. The village of Besteland lies about 7 kilometres (4.3 mi) to the south and the villages of Brokke and Hovet lie about 3 kilometres (1.9 mi) to the north.

== History ==
Rysstad was the administrative centre of the old Hylestad Municipality which existed from 1915 until its dissolution in 1962. Rysstad is the site of the historic Hylestad Church and its surrounding graveyard.
