= Hylestad Municipality =

Former municipality in Aust-Agder, Norway

Hylestad Municipality Hylestad herred
- Former municipality
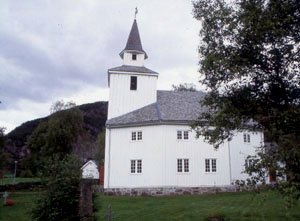
- View of the local Hylestad Church

- Aust-Agder within Norway

- Hylestad within Aust-Agder
- Coordinates: 59.0935°N 07.5359°E
- Country: Norway
- County: Aust-Agder
- District: Setesdal
- Established: 1 July 1915
  - Preceded by: Valle Municipality
- Disestablished: 1 Jan 1962
  - Succeeded by: Valle Municipality
- Administrative centre: Rysstad

Government
  - Mayor (1956-1961): Torjus J. Nomeland

Area (upon dissolution)
  - Total: 540.3 km^{2} (208.6 sq mi)
  - Rank: #182 in Norway
- Highest elevation: 1,302 m (4,272 ft)

Population (1961)
  - Total: 661
  - Rank: #702 in Norway
  - Density: 1.2/km^{2} (3.1/sq mi)
  - Change (10 years): ▼ −1.2%

Official language
  - Norwegian form: Nynorsk
- Time zone: UTC+01:00 (CET)
  - Summer (DST): UTC+02:00 (CEST)
- ISO 3166 code: NO-0939

Hylestad is a former municipality in the old Aust-Agder county, Norway. The 540-square-kilometre (210 sq mi) municipality existed from 1915 until its dissolution in 1962. The area is now part of Valle Municipality in the traditional district of Setesdal in Agder county. The administrative centre was the village of Rysstad where the Hylestad Church was located.

Prior to its dissolution in 1962, the 540.3-square-kilometre (208.6 sq mi) municipality was the 182nd largest by area out of the 731 municipalities in Norway. Hylestad Municipality was the 702nd most populous municipality in Norway with a population of about 661. The municipality's population density was 1.2 inhabitants per square kilometre (3.1/sq mi) and its population had decreased by 1.2% over the previous 10-year period.

== General information ==
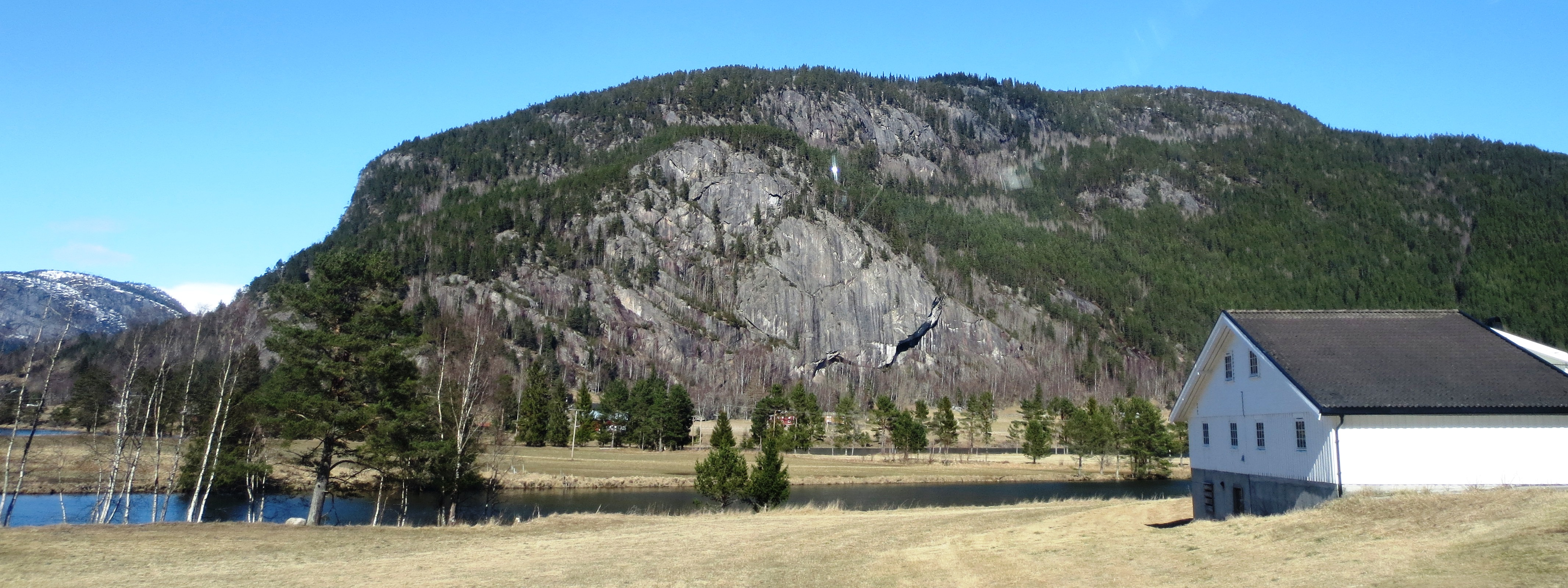
View of the Rysstad area

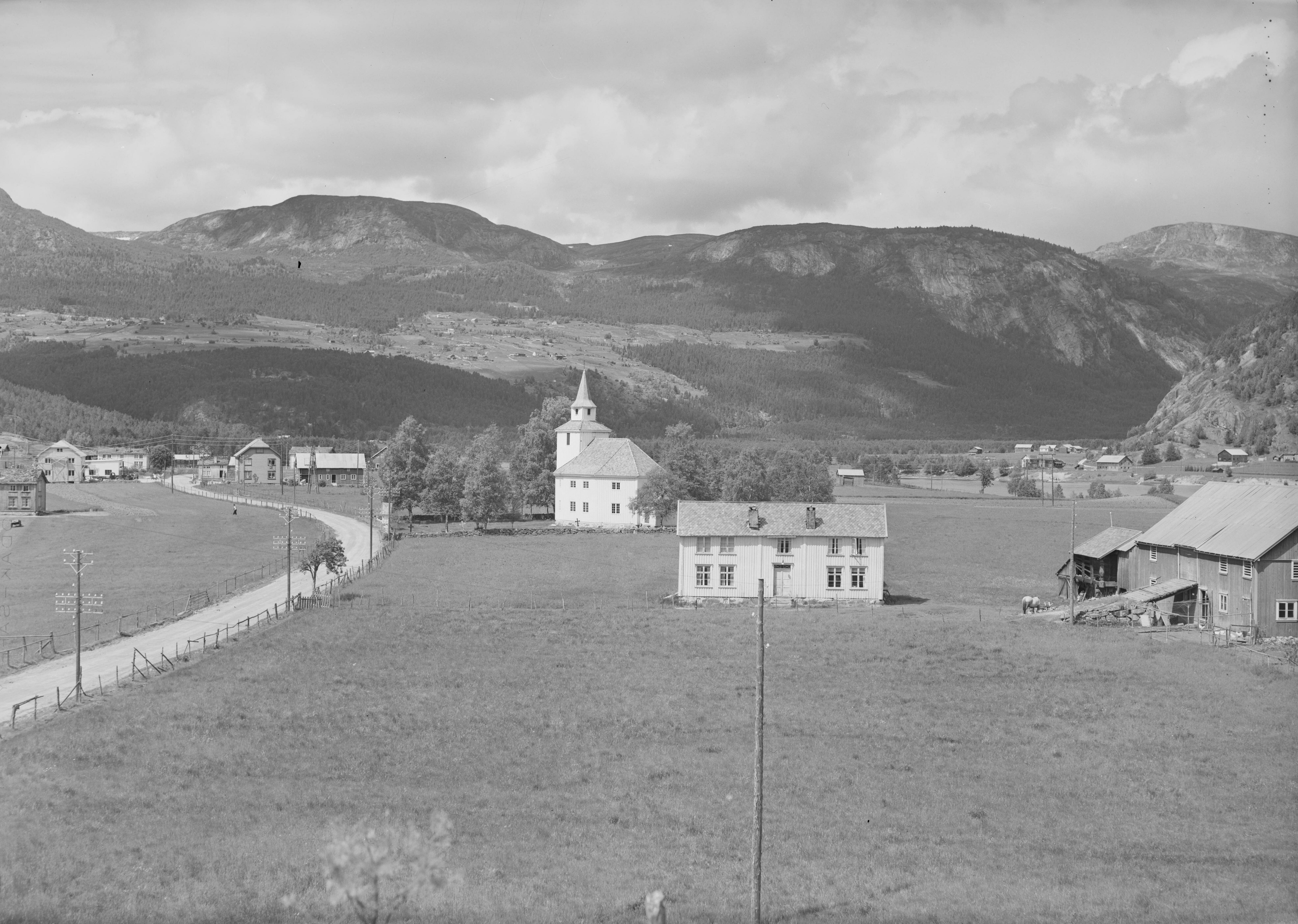
View of the Rysstad area in 1948

The parish of Hylestad was established as a municipality on 1 July 1915 when the large Valle Municipality was divided into two: Hylestad Municipality (population: 658) in the south and Valle Municipality (population: 1,051) in the north. During the 1960s, there were many municipal mergers across Norway due to the work of the Schei Committee. On 1 January 1962, Hylestad Municipality was reincorporated into Valle Municipality. Prior to the merger Hylestad Municipality had a population of 662.

=== Name ===
The municipality (originally the parish) is named after the old Hylestad farm (Old Norse: Hyljastaðir) since the first Hylestad Church was built there. The first element is the genitive case of the word hylr which means "deep place" or "pool in a river". The last element is the plural form of staðr which means "place", "homestead" or "abode".

=== Churches ===
The Church of Norway had one parish (sokn) within Hylestad Municipality. At the time of the municipal dissolution, it was part of the Valle prestegjeld and the Otredal prosti (deanery) in the Diocese of Agder.

Churches in Hylestad Municipality
Parish (sokn)	Church name	Location of the church	Year built
Hylestad	Hylestad Church	Rysstad	1839

== Geography ==
The highest point in the municipality was the 1,302-metre (4,272 ft) tall mountain Beinleinuten, located in the Setesdalsheiene mountains just east of the lake Rosskreppfjorden in the western part of the municipality. The river Otra flowed through the central part of the municipality. Valle Municipality was located to the north, Fyresdal Municipality was located to the east (in Telemark county), Bygland Municipality was located to the south, and Sirdal Municipality was located to the west (in Vest-Agder county).

== Government ==
While it existed, Hylestad Municipality was responsible for primary education (through 10th grade), outpatient health services, senior citizen services, welfare and other social services, zoning, economic development, and municipal roads and utilities. The municipality was governed by a municipal council of directly elected representatives. The mayor was indirectly elected by a vote of the municipal council. The municipality was under the jurisdiction of the Setesdal District Court and the Agder Court of Appeal.

=== Municipal council ===
The municipal council (Herredsstyre) of Hylestad Municipality was made up of 13 representatives that were elected to four year terms. The tables below show the historical composition of the council by political party.

Hylestad heradsstyre 1959–1961
Party name (in Nynorsk)	Number of representatives
Labour Party (Arbeidarpartiet)	4
Centre Party (Senterpartiet)	6
List of workers, fishermen, and small farmholders (Arbeidarar, fiskarar, småbrukarar liste)	3
Total number of members:	13
Note: On 1 January 1962, Hylestad Municipality became part of Valle Municipality.

Hylestad heradsstyre 1955–1959
Party name (in Nynorsk)	Number of representatives
Labour Party (Arbeidarpartiet)	5
Joint List(s) of Non-Socialist Parties (Borgarlege Felleslister)	5
Local List(s) (Lokale lister)	3
Total number of members:	13

Hylestad heradsstyre 1951–1955
Party name (in Nynorsk)	Number of representatives
Labour Party (Arbeidarpartiet)	5
Joint List(s) of Non-Socialist Parties (Borgarlege Felleslister)	7
Total number of members:	12

Hylestad heradsstyre 1947–1951
Party name (in Nynorsk)	Number of representatives
Labour Party (Arbeidarpartiet)	5
Joint List(s) of Non-Socialist Parties (Borgarlege Felleslister)	7
Total number of members:	12

Hylestad heradsstyre 1945–1947
Party name (in Nynorsk)	Number of representatives
Labour Party (Arbeidarpartiet)	6
Joint List(s) of Non-Socialist Parties (Borgarlege Felleslister)	6
Total number of members:	12

Hylestad heradsstyre 1937–1941*
Party name (in Nynorsk)	Number of representatives
Labour Party (Arbeidarpartiet)	5
Farmers' Party (Bondepartiet)	5
List of workers, fishermen, and small farmholders (Arbeidarar, fiskarar, småbrukarar liste)	2
Total number of members:	12
Note: Due to the German occupation of Norway during World War II, no elections were held for new municipal councils until after the war ended in 1945.

=== Mayors ===
The mayor (Nynorsk: ordførar) of Hylestad Municipality was the political leader of the municipality and the chairperson of the municipal council. The following people have held this position:

- 1915–1916: Gunnar Torgeirsson Rysstad (H)
- 1916–1922: Tarald J. Harstad (Ap)
- 1923–1925: Gunnar Torgeirsson Rysstad (H)
- 1926–1928: Torgeir G. Straume
- 1929–1934: Jon O. Nomeland
- 1934–1937: Aani Aanisson Rysstad (Ap)
- 1938–1941: Jon O. Nomeland
- 1941–1945: Jon T. Rysstad (NS)
- 1945–1951: Jon O. Nomeland
- 1952–1955: Såvi G. Straume (V)
- 1956–1961: Torjus J. Nomeland

== Notable people ==
- Osmund Faremo (1921-1999), a Norwegian politician
- Aani Aanisson Rysstad (1894-1965), a Norwegian politician

== See also ==
- List of former municipalities of Norway
