= Sandhø Heights =

Mountain in Queen Maud Land, Antarctica

Sandhø Heights (71°50′S 9°47′E) is a bare rock heights forming the summit area in the central Conrad Mountains, in Queen Maud Land. Discovered and photographed by the German Antarctic Expedition of 1938-39 and mapped by Norway from air photos and surveys by Norwegian Antarctic Expedition, 1956–60, and named Sandhø ("sand heights").
