= Sverre Pettersen =

Norwegian footballer (1903-1985)

Personal information
- Date of birth: 1 January 1903
- Date of death: 19 February 1985 (aged 82)

International career
Years	Team	Apps	(Gls)
1926	Norway	1	(0)

Sverre Pettersen (1 January 1903 – 19 February 1985) was a Norwegian footballer. He played in one match for the Norway national football team in 1926.
