= Habermehl Peak =

Antarctic mountain

Habermehl Peak (German: Habermehlgipfel, 71°49′S 6°55′E) is a peak 2,945 metres (9,660 ft) high, 5 km (3 mi) south of Gessner Peak in the northeast part of the Mühlig-Hofmann Mountains of Queen Maud Land, Antarctica. It was discovered by the Third German Antarctic Expedition (1938–1939), led by Captain Alfred Ritscher, and named for Richard Habermehl, the director of the German Weather Service. It was remapped from air photos taken by the Sixth Norwegian Antarctic Expedition, 1958–59.
