= Slokstallen Mountain =

Mountain of Queen Maud Land

Coordinates: 72°0′S 4°55′E

Slokstallen Mountain is a mountain 1 nautical mile (1.9 km) east of Petrellfjellet in the Muhlig-Hofmann Mountains, Queen Maud Land. Mapped by Norwegian cartographers from surveys and air photos by the Norwegian Antarctic Expedition (1956–60) and named Slokstallen (the millrace barn).
