= Vestreskorve Glacier =

Glacier in Antarctica

- Location of Queen Maud Land in Antarctica

- Location within Antarctica
- Location: Queen Maud Land
- Coordinates: 71°57′S 05°05′E
- Thickness: unknown
- Terminus: Mühlig-Hofmann Mountains
- Status: unknown

Vestreskorve Glacier is a broad glacier in the Mühlig-Hofmann Mountains, to the south of Breplogen Mountain, which drains from a position opposite the head of Austreskorve Glacier northwestward along the west side of Svarthamaren Mountain. Plotted and named from surveys and air photos by the Norwegian Antarctic Expedition (1956–60).

== See also ==
- List of glaciers in the Antarctic
- Glaciology
