= Lunde Glacier =

Glacier in Antarctica

- Location of Queen Maud Land in Antarctica

- Location within Antarctica
- Location: Queen Maud Land
- Coordinates: 71°53′S 6°15′E
- Length: 25 nmi (46 km; 29 mi)
- Thickness: unknown
- Terminus: Mühlig-Hofmann Mountains
- Status: unknown

Lunde Glacier (71°53′S 6°15′E) is a glacier about 25 nautical miles (46 km) long flowing northwest between Håhellerskarvet and Jøkulkyrkja Mountain in the Mühlig-Hofmann Mountains on the Princess Astrid Coast of Queen Maud Land.

== Discovery and naming ==
The glacier was mapped by Norwegian cartographers from surveys and air photos by the Sixth Norwegian Antarctic Expedition (1956–60) and named for T. Lunde, a glaciologist with the Norwegian expedition (1956–58).

== See also ==
- Bakkesvodene Crags
- List of glaciers in the Antarctic
- Glaciology
