= Breplogen Mountain =

Mountain in Antarctica

Breplogen Mountain (71°55′S 5°27′E) is a broad mountain, 2,725 metres (8,940 ft) high, which is ice-covered except on its north and east sides, standing west of Austreskorve Glacier in the Mühlig-Hofmann Mountains of Queen Maud Land.

== Discovery and naming ==
Breplogen Mountain was plotted from surveys and from air photos by the Sixth Norwegian Antarctic Expedition (1956–60) and named Breplogen (the "glacier plough").

== See also ==
- List of mountains of Queen Maud Land
- Sengekoven Cirque
