= Festninga Mountain =

Mountain in Antarctica

Coordinates: 72°7′S 3°43′E

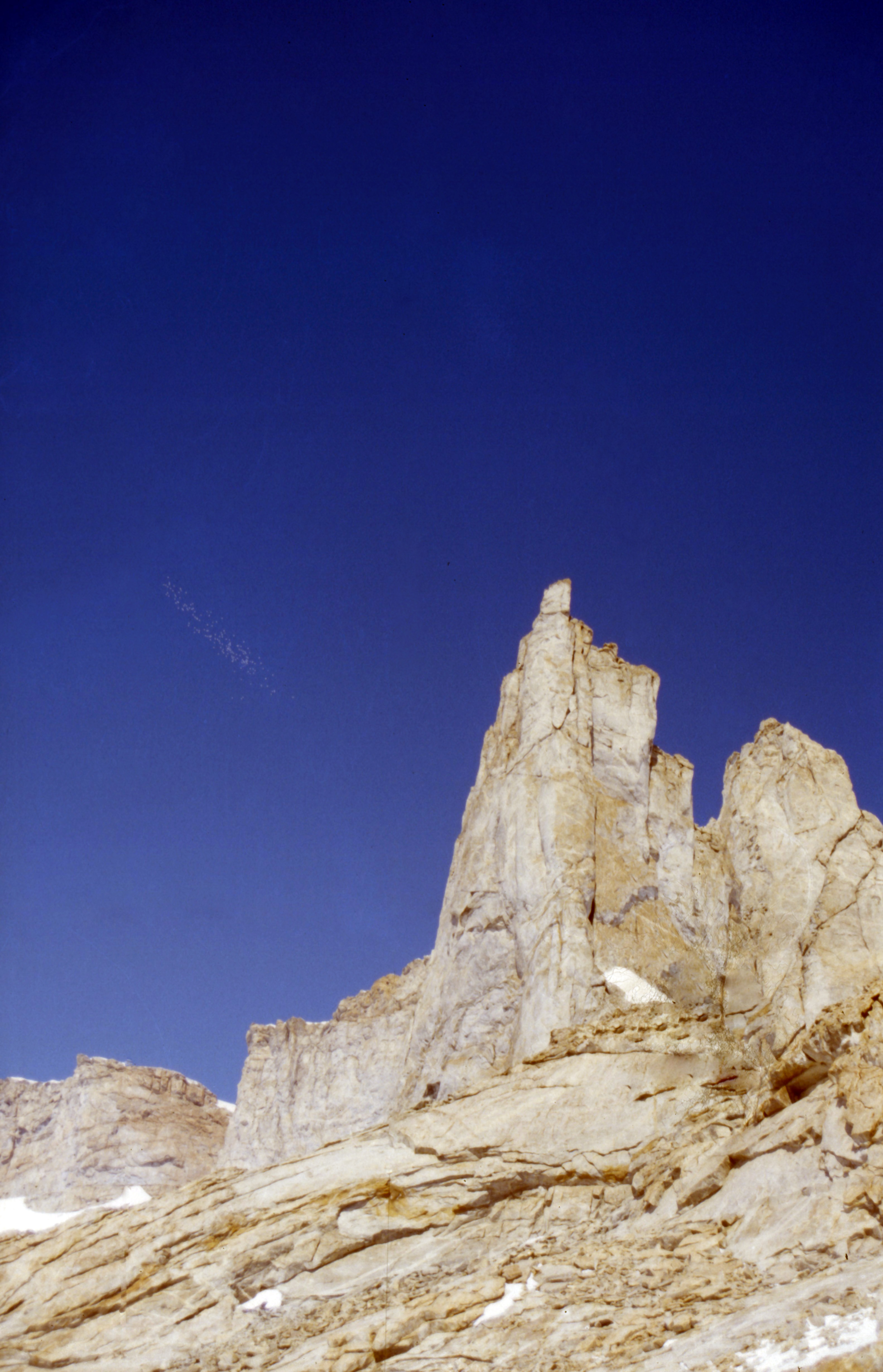
Detail from Festninga Mountain

Festninga Mountain is a broad, ice-topped mountain, 2,535 metres (8,320 ft) high, standing west of Mount Hochlin at the west end of the Mühlig-Hofmann Mountains, in Queen Maud Land, Antarctica. it was mapped by Norwegian cartographers from surveys and air photos by the Sixth Norwegian Antarctic Expedition (1956–60) and named Festninga (the fortress). Austvollen Bluff forms the east side of the mountain.

== See also ==
- Vestvollen Bluff
