= Mount Hochlin =

Mountain in Antarctica

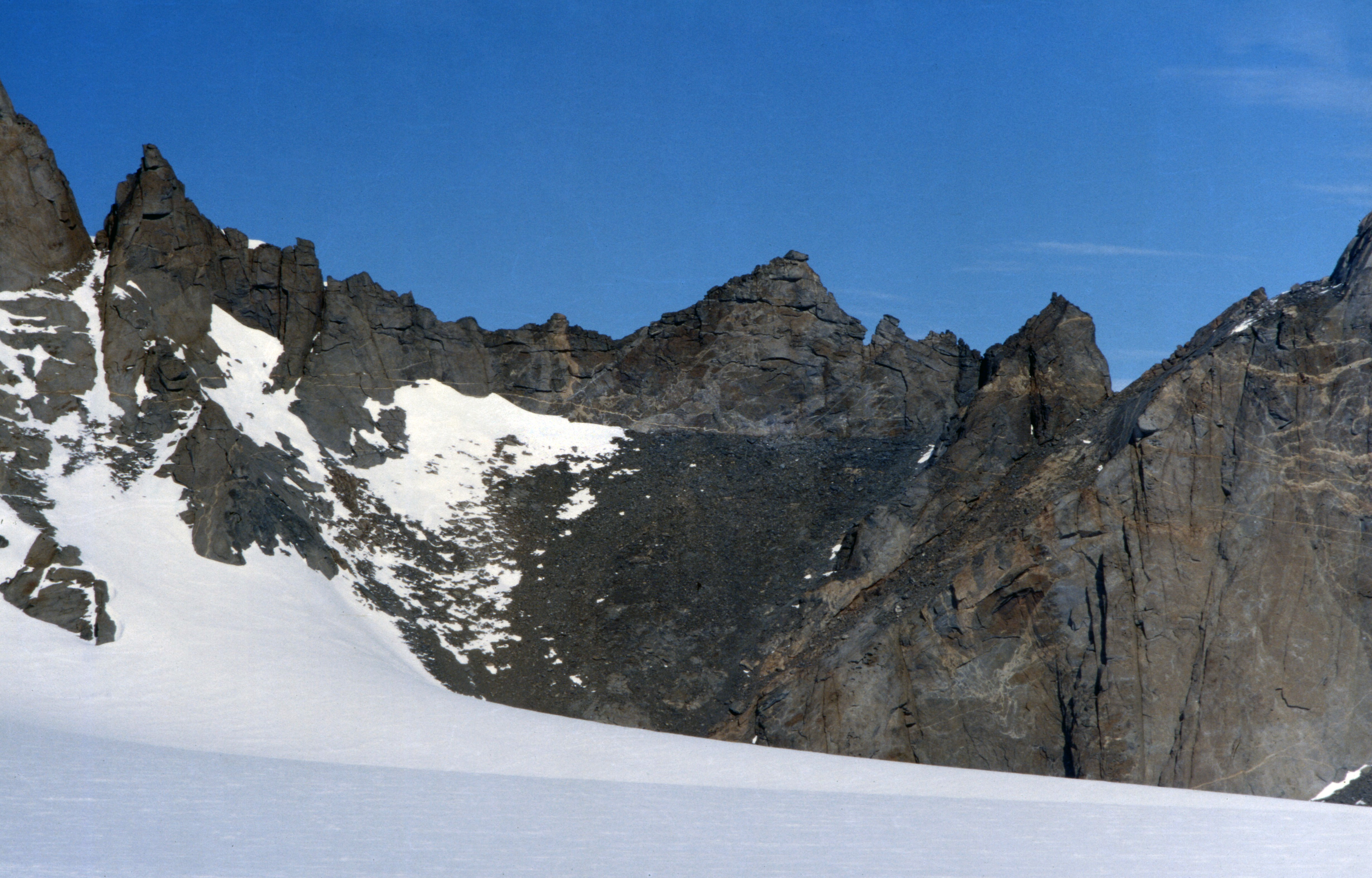
Mount Hochlin

Mount Hochlin (72°5′S 4°3′E) is a large ice-topped mountain, 2,760 metres (9,060 ft) high, standing east of Festninga Mountain in the Mühlig-Hofmann Mountains of Queen Maud Land, Antarctica. The Spøta Spur extends from its north-central section. It was mapped by Norwegian cartographers from surveys and air photos by the Sixth Norwegian Antarctic Expedition (1956–60) and named for L. Hochlin, a radio operator and dog driver with the expedition (1956–58).

== See also ==
- Stålstuten Ridge
- Tunet Valley
