= Mount Grytøyr =

Mountain in Queen Maud Land, Antarctica

Mount Grytøyr (72°0′S 4°31′E) is a broad ice-topped mountain, 2,695 metres (8,840 ft) high, between Flogeken Glacier and Stuttflog Glacier in the Mühlig-Hofmann Mountains of Queen Maud Land, Antarctica. It was mapped by Norwegian cartographers from surveys and air photos by the Sixth Norwegian Antarctic Expedition (1956–60) and named for B. Grytøyr, a meteorologist with the expedition (1956–58).

== See also ==
- Skredbotnen Cirque
- Stuttfloget Cliff
