= Austreskorve Glacier =

Glacier in Antarctica

- Location of Queen Maud Land in Antarctica

- Location within Antarctica
- Location: Queen Maud Land
- Coordinates: 71°50′S 5°40′E
- Thickness: unknown
- Status: unknown

Austreskorve Glacier (71°50′S 5°40′E) is a broad glacier in the Mühlig-Hofmann Mountains which drains north from a position just east of the head of Vestreskorve Glacier and passes along the east side of Breplogen Mountain. It was mapped and named from surveys and from air photos by the Sixth Norwegian Antarctic Expedition (1956–60).

== See also ==
- List of glaciers in the Antarctic
- Glaciology
- Styggebrekkufsa Bluff
