= Conrad Mountains =

Mountain range in Antarctica

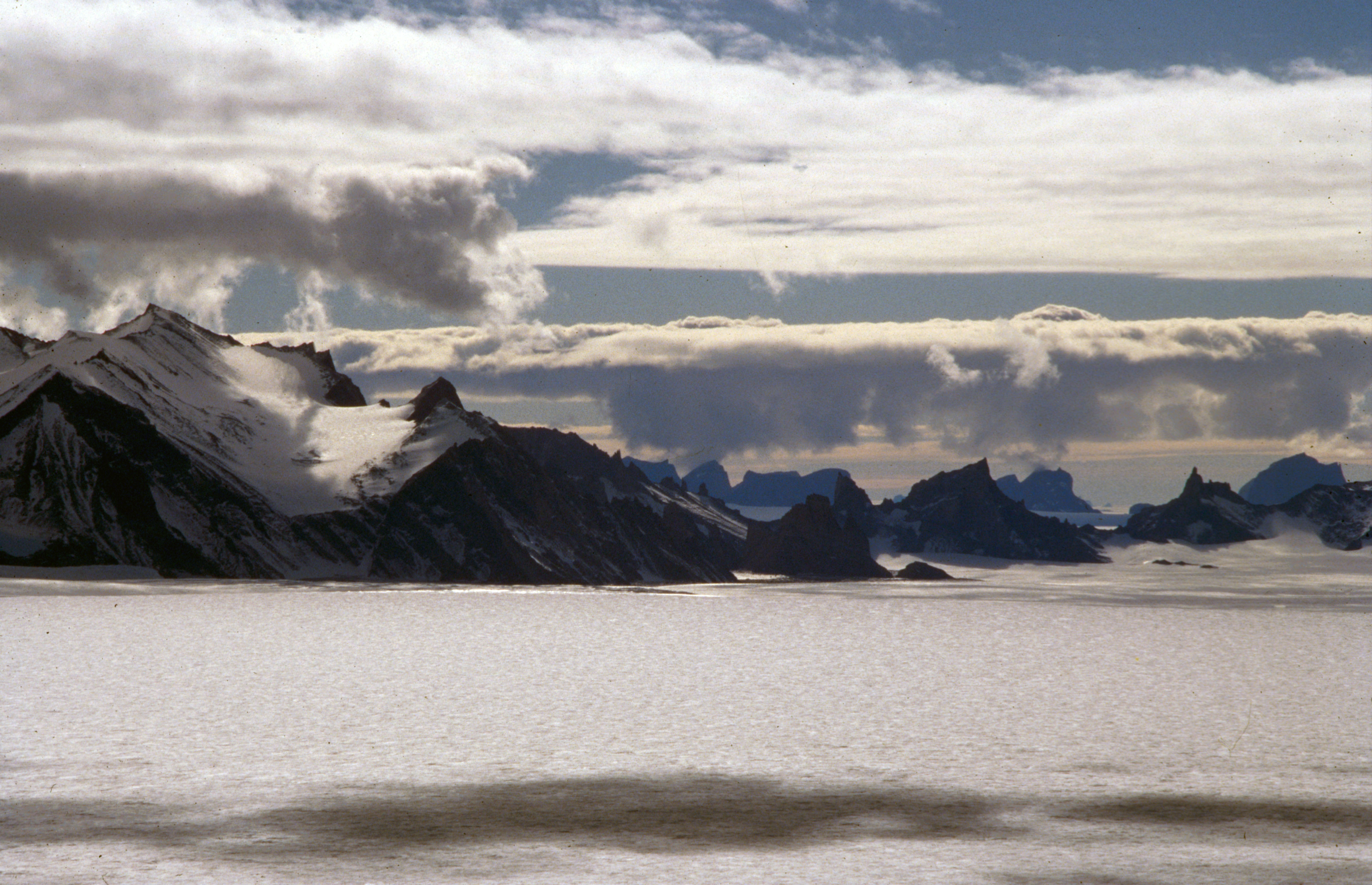
- View looking to the west over Glopeken glacier, in the northern part of the Conrad Mountains.

Highest point
- Peak: Sandeggtind Peak
- Elevation: 10,023 ft (3,055 m)
- Coordinates: 71°50′S 09°40′E

Naming
- Native name: Conradfjella (Norwegian)

Geography
- Location within Antarctica
- Continent: Antarctica
- Region(s): Queen Maud Land, East Antarctica
- Parent range: Orvin Mountains

The Conrad Mountains (German: Conradgebirge, Norwegian: Conradfjella) are a narrow chain of mountains, 30 km (19 mi) long, located between the Gagarin Mountains and Mount Dallmann in Queen Maud Land, Antarctica. The Conrad Mountains are a subrange of the Orvin Mountains. With its summit at 3,055 metres (10,023 ft), the massive Sandeggtind Peak forms the highest point in the Conrad Mountains.

== Discovery and naming ==
The Conrad Mountains were discovered by the Third German Antarctic Expedition (1938–1939), led by Captain Alfred Ritscher, and named for Rear Admiral Heinrich Friedrich (Fritz) Conrad (18 April 1883 – 1 January 1944), director of the meteorological division of the former Marineleitung (German Admiralty). They were surveyed by the Sixth Norwegian Antarctic Expedition, 1956-1960.

== See also ==
- Henry Moraine
- List of mountains of Queen Maud Land
