= Kurze Mountains =

Mountain range in Antarctica

Coordinates: 71°53′S 8°55′E

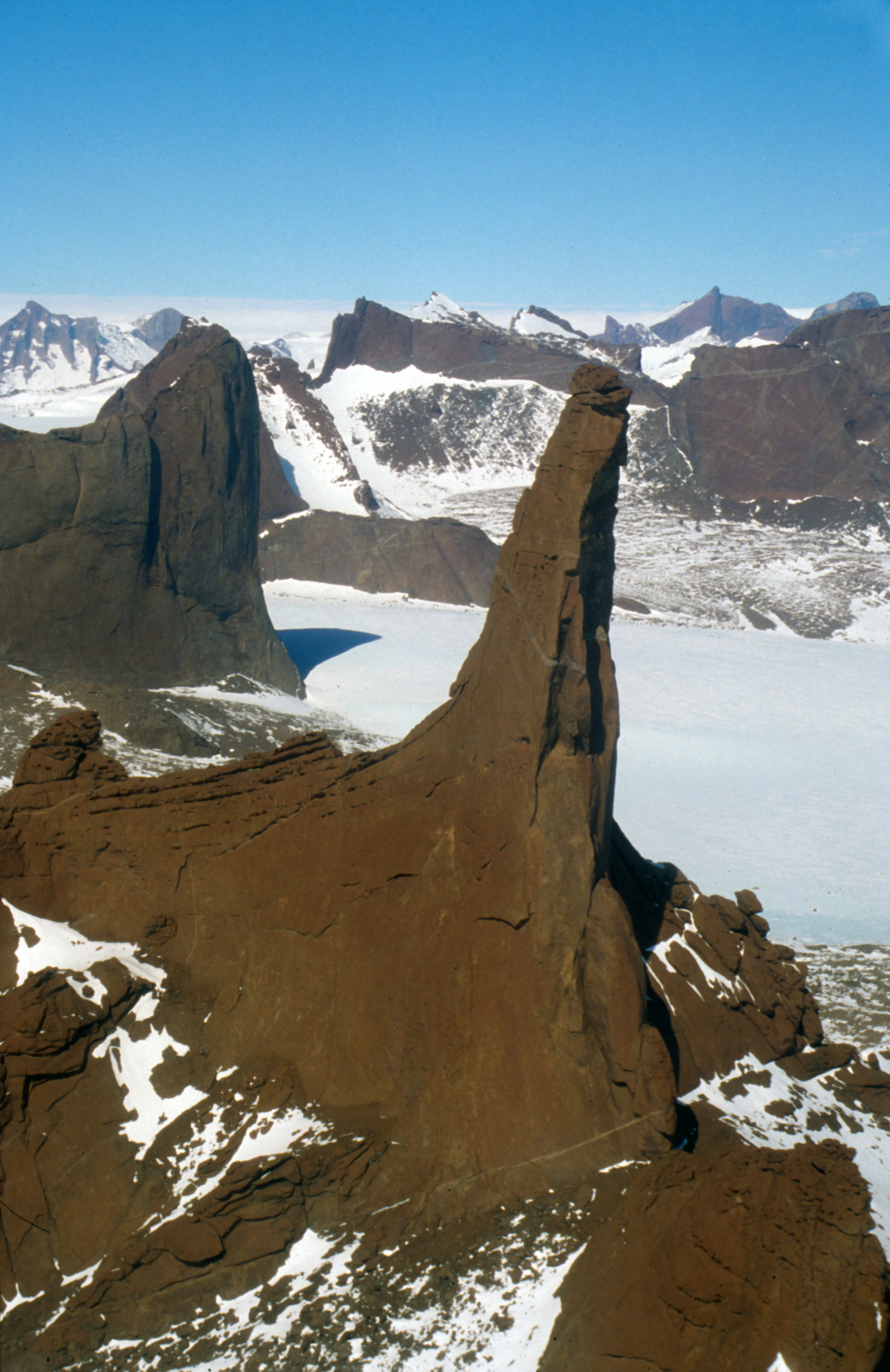
Holtedahlfjella (Kurze) Nord

The Kurze Mountains (German: Kurzegebirge) are a range of mainly bare rock peaks, ridges and mountains about 20 nautical miles (40 km) long and 6 nautical miles (11 km) wide in the Orvin Mountains of Queen Maud Land, Antarctica. The feature stands between the Drygalski Mountains on the west and the Gagarin Mountains and Conrad Mountains on the east.

The Kurze Mountains were discovered and plotted from aerial photographs taken by the Third German Antarctic Expedition under Alfred Ritscher, 1938–39, who named them for the director of the Naval Division of the former Marineleitung (German Admiralty). They were remapped by the Norsk Polarinstitutt from surveys and aerial photos taken by the Sixth Norwegian Antarctic Expedition, 1956–60, and given the name "Holtedahlfjella." The correlation of the prior name (Kurze) with this feature is quite definite and is recommended for the sake of international uniformity and historical continuity.

== See also ==
- Gruvleflesa Knolls
- Hålishalsen Saddle
