= Jøkulkyrkja Mountain =

Mountain in Queen Maud Land, Antarctica

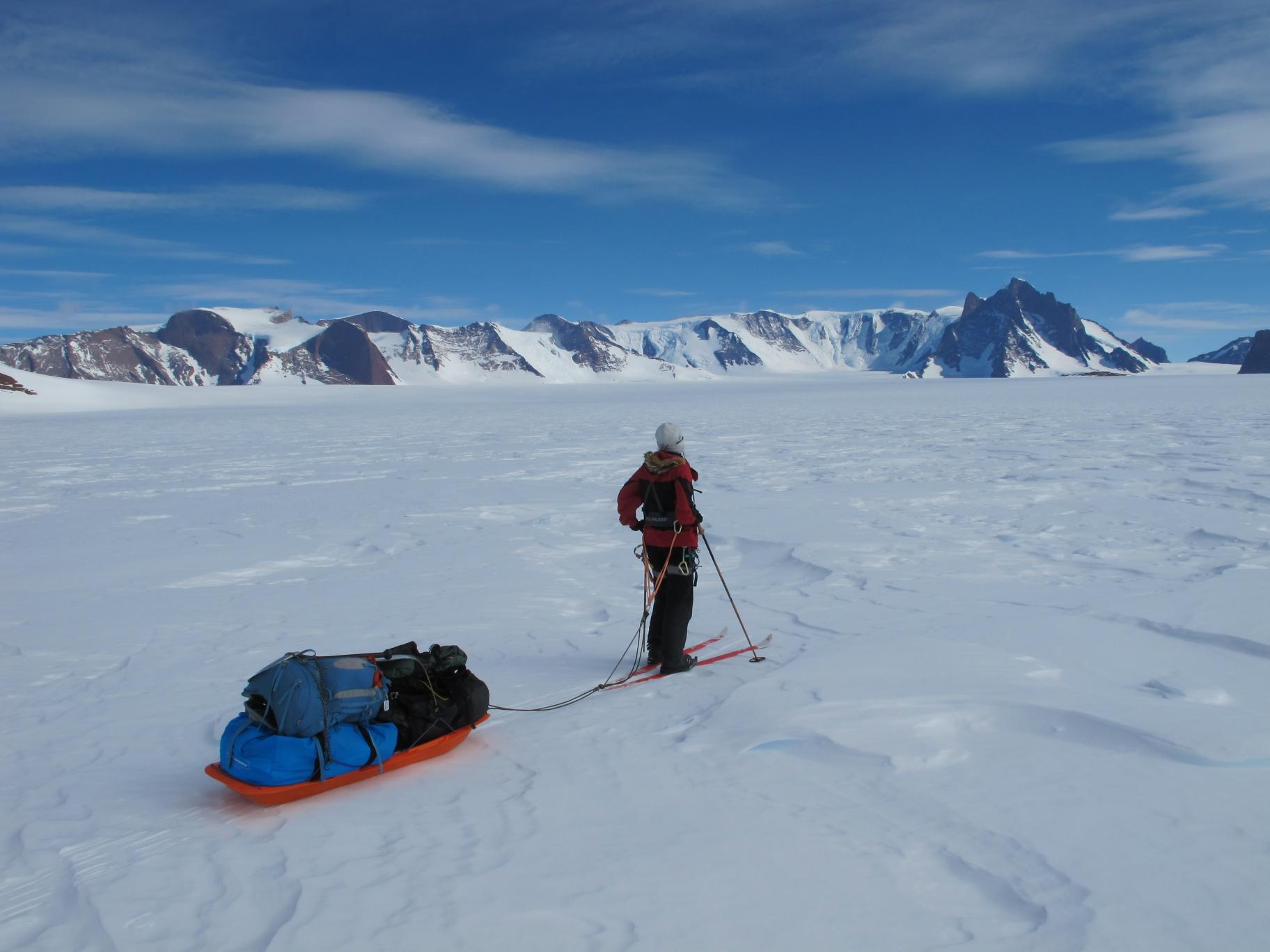
- Jøkulkyrkja seen from the east. The summit is behind what seems like the highest point to the right.

Highest point
- Elevation: 3,148 m (10,328 ft)
- Coordinates: 71°53′S 6°40′E

Geography
- Location: Princess Astrid Coast, Queen Maud Land, East Antarctica
- Parent range: Mühlig-Hofmann Mountains

Climbing
- Easiest route: basic snow/ice climb

Jøkulkyrkja Mountain ("the Glacier Church"), also known as Massiv Yakova Gakkelya, is a broad, ice-topped mountain with several radial rock spurs, standing east of Lunde Glacier in the Mühlig-Hofmann Mountains of Queen Maud Land, East Antarctica. At 3,148 metres (10,328 ft) elevation, it is the highest mountain in Queen Maud Land, and also the highest rock elevation within the claims of Norway. However, Dome F is also located in Queen Maud Land, and rises to about 3,700 metres (12,100 ft). The mountain is located on the Princess Astrid Coast of the Norwegian Antarctic Territory. Håhellerskarvet ("shark cave mountain"), 2,910 metres (9,550 ft), is located to the southwest; the two peaks are separated by the 25-mile-long Lunde Glacier, which flows to the northwest.

== Discovery and naming ==
Jøkulkyrkja Mountain was plotted from surveys and air photos by the Sixth Norwegian Antarctic Expedition (1956–60) and named Jøkulkyrkja. The first element is jøkul m 'small glacier', the last element is the finite form of kyrkje f 'church'. (Like other names in the Norwegian Arctic and Antarctic islands and areas the Nynorsk form of Norwegian is used in the name - the Bokmål form would have been *Jøkelkirken or *Jøkelkirka).

== Mountaineering significance ==
The first ascent of Jøkulkyrkja Mountain was in January 1994, by a team of 13 mountain climbers led by Ivar Tollefsen. The first woman to reach the top was Merete Asak, November 2010.

== See also ==
- List of mountains of Queen Maud Land
