= Mühlig-Hofmann Mountains =

Mountain range in Antarctica

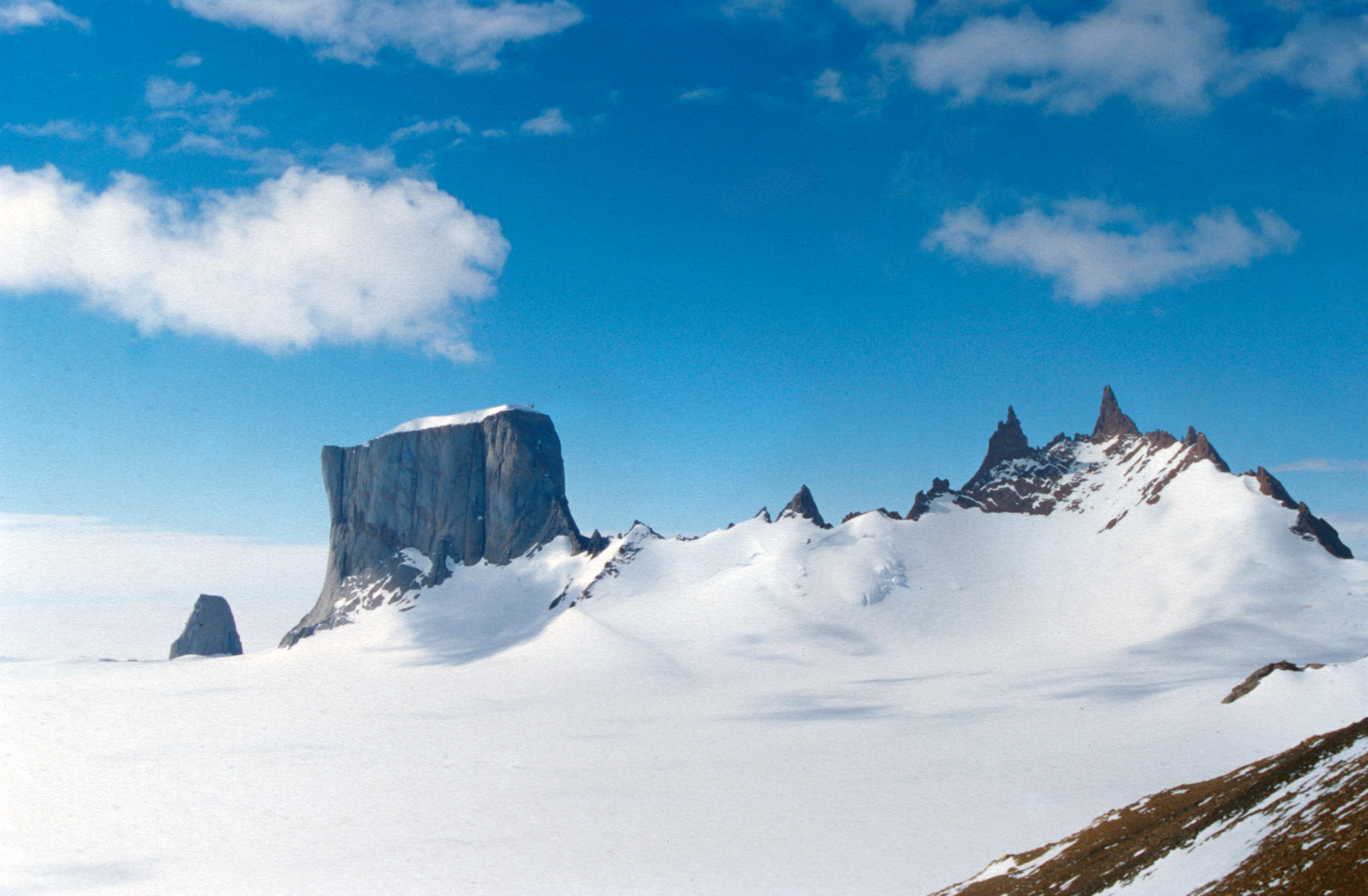
- Hoggestabben in the Mühlig-Hofmann Mountains

Highest point
- Peak: Jøkulkyrkja Mountain
- Elevation: 3,148 m (10,328 ft)
- Coordinates: 72°00′S 05°20′E

Naming
- Native name: Mühlig-Hofmann-Gebirge (German)

Geography
- Location within Antarctica
- Continent: Antarctica
- Region: Queen Maud Land, East Antarctica
- Parent range: Fimbulheimen

The Mühlig-Hofmann Mountains (German: Mühlig-Hofmann-Gebirge) is a major group of associated mountain features extending east to west for 100 km (62 mi) between the Gjelsvik Mountains and the Orvin Mountains in Queen Maud Land, East Antarctica. With its summit at 3,148 metres (10,328 ft), the massive Jøkulkyrkja Mountain forms the highest point in the Mühlig-Hofmann Mountains.

== Discovery and naming ==
The Mühlig-Hofmann Mountains were discovered by the Third German Antarctic Expedition (1938-1939), led by Capt. Alfred Ritscher, and named for the division director of the German Air Ministry. They were remapped by the Norwegian Antarctic Expedition, 1956-1960.

== Features ==
=== Glaciers ===
- Austreskorve Glacier
  - Kvitholten Hill
- Flogeken Glacier
- Langflog Glacier
- Lunde Glacier
- Skålebreen
  - Skålebrehalsen Terrace
- Sloket Glacier
- Tønnesen Glacier
- Vestreskorve Glacier
  - Hamarglovene Crevasses

=== Mountains and ranges ===
- Ahlstad Hills
- Breplogen Mountain
  - Høgsenga Crags
  - Småkovane Cirques
- Buddenbrock Range
- Cumulus Mountain
- Jøkulkyrkja Mountain
  - Jøkulfallet
  - Jøkulhest Dome
  - Kyrkjetorget
  - Larsen Cliffs
  - Kyrkjebakken Slope
  - Kapellet Canyon
  - Katedralen Canyon
- Djupedalshausane Peaks
- Festninga Mountain
  - Austvollen Bluff
  - Festningsporten Pass
- Gablenz Range
  - Mount Grytøyr
  - Skigarden Ridge
    - Bjørn Spur
- Gessner Peak
- Habermehl Peak
- Håhellerskarvet
- Halsknappane Hills
- Hamarøya Mountain
- Huldreskorvene Peaks
- Kyrkjeskipet Peak
- Luz Range
  - Snøtoa Terrace
- Mount Hädrich
- Mount Hochlin
- Mount Kropotkin
- Nikolayev Range
- Preuschoff Range
- Sloknuten Peak
- Snønutane Peaks
  - Snønutryggen
- Thälmann Mountains

=== Other ===
- Djupedalen Valley
- Grinda Ridge
- Hamarskorvene Bluff
- Hoggestabben Butte
- Tvibåsen Valley
  - Båsbolken Spur
- Jaren Crags
- Kaye Crest
- Kvea Valley
- Kvithamaren Cliff
- Kyrkjedalen Valley
- Kyrkjedalshalsen Saddle
- Langfloget Cliff
- Øvrevollen Bluff
- Småsponen Nunatak
- Snøbjørga Bluff
- Torbjørn Rocks
- Tussebrekka Slope
- Tverrseten Col

== See also ==
- Extreme points of Norway
- List of mountains of Queen Maud Land
- Fimbulheimen
- Sprekkefjellet, a hill 9 km away from this location
- Stuttfloget Cliff
- Styggebrekkufsa Bluff
