= Sixth Norwegian Antarctic Expedition =

Scientific expedition to Queen Maud Land, Antarctica

The sixth Norwegian Antarctic Expedition (Den norske antarktisekspedisjonen) was a scientific expedition to Queen Maud's Land in Antarctica. The expedition was based at Norway Station (70°30′S 02°32′W) which was located on the Fimbul Ice Shelf bordering the coast of Queen Maud Land.

The expedition carried out survey work and scientific studies for three-four years (1956–1960). The expedition was intended as part of Norway's participation in the International Geophysical Year, 1957-58. The crew set sail from Oslo on board two whaling ships, the Polarsirkel and Polarbjørn, on 10 November 1956.

The expedition was led by Sigurd Gunnarson Helle, a geodesist at Norsk Polarinstitutt. It included a total crew of fourteen researchers which was reduced to nine during the third year. Among their activities was topological mapping of the region.

In 1960, King Olav V of Norway instituted the Antarctic Medal (Antarktismedaljen) commemorating the expedition which was awarded to 37 people who were attached to the expedition in various ways.
