= Vos'moy Mart Rocks =

Vos'moy Mart Rocks (72°2′S 14°40′E) is a group of rocks lying 0.5 nautical miles (0.9 km) east of Mount Dzhalil' in Linnormen Hills, Payer Mountains, in Queen Maud Land. Mapped from air photos and surveys by the Norwegian Antarctic Expedition, 1956–60; remapped by Soviet Antarctic Expedition, 1960–61, and named Skaly Vos'mogo Marta (March 8 Rocks) in recognition of International Women's Day.
