= Mount Yesenin =

Mountain in Queen Maud Land, Antarctica

Mount Yesenin (72°3′S 14°26′E) is a mountain, 2,520 m, standing 2 miles (3.2 km) northwest of Yeliseyev Rocks in the Payer Mountains of Queen Maud Land. Mapped from air photos and surveys by Norwegian Antarctic Expedition, 1956–60; remapped by Soviet Antarctic Expedition, 1960–61, and named after Russian poet Sergei Yesenin (1895–1925).
