= Ormeryggen =

Hills in Antarctica

Ormeryggen (72°4′S 14°33′E) are three major hills forming the central portion of Linnormen Hills, standing southeast of Skavlho Mountain in the Payer Mountains of Queen Maud Land. Photographed from the air by the German Antarctic Expedition (1938–39). Mapped by Norwegian cartographers from surveys and air photos by the Norwegian Antarctic Expedition (1956–60) and named Ormeryggen (the serpent's back).
