= Stenka Mountain =

Mountain in Queen Maud Land, Antarctica

Stenka Mountain (71°55′S 14°46′E) is a mountain, 2,350 m, forming the central part of Spraglegga Ridge in the Payer Mountains of Queen Maud Land. Discovered and plotted from air photos by the German Antarctic Expedition, 1938/39. Mapped from air photos and surveys by Norwegian Antarctic Expedition, 1956–60; remapped by Soviet Antarctic Expedition, 1960/61, and named Gora Stenka (little wall mountain).
