= Mjøllkvaevane Cirques =

Cirque in Antarctica

The Mjøllkvaevane Cirques (71°53′S 14°27′E) are a series of small snow-filled cirques that indent the east side of Kvaevefjellet Mountain in the Payer Mountains of Queen Maud Land, Antarctica. They were plotted from air photos and surveys by the Sixth Norwegian Antarctic Expedition, 1956–60.
