= Yeliseyev Rocks =

Yeliseyev Rocks (72°5′S 14°30′E) is a group of rocks forming the south part of Linnormen Hills in the Payer Mountains, Queen Maud Land. Discovered and plotted from air photos by German Antarctic Expedition, 1938–39. Mapped from surveys and air photos by Norwegian Antarctic Expedition, 1958–59; remapped by Soviet Antarctic Expedition, 1960–61, and named after Soviet geologist N.A. Yeliseyev.
