= Mount Dzhalil' =

Mountain in Antarctica

Mount Dzhalil' (72°1′S 14°36′E) is a small mountain, 2,510 metres (8,230 ft) high, in the Linnormen Hills of the Payer Mountains, in Queen Maud Land. It was mapped from air photos and surveys by the Sixth Norwegian Antarctic Expedition, 1956–60. It was remapped by the Soviet Antarctic Expedition, 1960–61, and named after Musa Dzhalil', the Soviet poet.
