= Julius Fučík =

Julius Fučík may refer to:

- Julius Fučík (composer) (1872–1916), Czech composer and conductor
- Julius Fučík (journalist) (1903–1943), Czech journalist and writer

== See also ==
- Yulius Fuchik, a Soviet and later Russian barge carrier
- Fučík, a Czech surname
