= Veterok Rock =

Rock formation in Queen Maud Land, Antarctica

Veterok Rock (71°54′S 14°43′E) is a prominent rock just north of Spraglegga Ridge in the Payer Mountains of Queen Maud Land. It was mapped from air photos and surveys by Norwegian Antarctic Expedition, 1956–60, and later remapped by the Soviet Antarctic Expedition, 1960–61, and named in commemoration of the achievement of Soviet scientists in the study of space.
