= Aurkvaevane Cirques =

Cirques in Antarctica

Coordinates: 71°52′S 14°26′E

The Aurkvaevane Cirques are a set of three cirques with moraine-covered floors, indenting the west side of Kvaevefjellet Mountain in the Payer Mountains of Queen Maud Land. They were discovered and plotted from air photos by the Third German Antarctic Expedition, 1938–39, and re-plotted from air photos and from surveys, and named, by the Sixth Norwegian Antarctic Expedition, 1956–60.
