= Spraglegga Ridge =

Spraglegga Ridge (71°55′S 14°45′E) is a ridge that is partly rock and partly covered by snow, surmounted by Stenka Mountain, standing 4.5 nautical miles (8 km) southeast of Kvaevefjellet Mountain in the Payer Mountains, Queen Maud Land. Discovered and plotted from air photos by German Antarctic Expedition, 1938–39. Replotted from air photos and surveys by Norwegian Antarctic Expedition, 1956 60, and named Spraglegga.
