= Fučík =

Fučík (feminine: Fučíková) is a Czech surname. Notable people with the surname include:

- Bernhard Fucik (born 1990), Austrian footballer
- Gusta Fučíková (1903–1987), Czech politician and activist
- Julius Fučík (composer) (1872–1916), Czech composer and conductor
- Julius Fučík (journalist) (1903–1943), Czech journalist and writer
- Renáta Fučíková (born 1964), Czech illustrator, artist and writer
- Tomáš Fučík (born 1985), Czech swimmer

== See also ==
- Mount Fučík, mountain of Antarctica
- 2345 Fučik, main-belt asteroid
