= Molchaniya Rock =

Molchaniya Rock (72°9′S 14°8′E) is an isolated rock 6 nautical miles (11 km) west-northwest of the Rokhlin Nunataks in the Payer Mountains of Queen Maud Land, Antarctica. It was discovered and first plotted from air photos by the Third German Antarctic Expedition of 1938–39. The rock was remapped from air photos and surveys by the Soviet Antarctic Expedition of 1960–61, and named "Skala Molchaniya" (silent rock).
