= Bethlehem Chapel =

Building in Prague, Czech Republic

Coordinates: 50°5′4″N 14°25′3″E

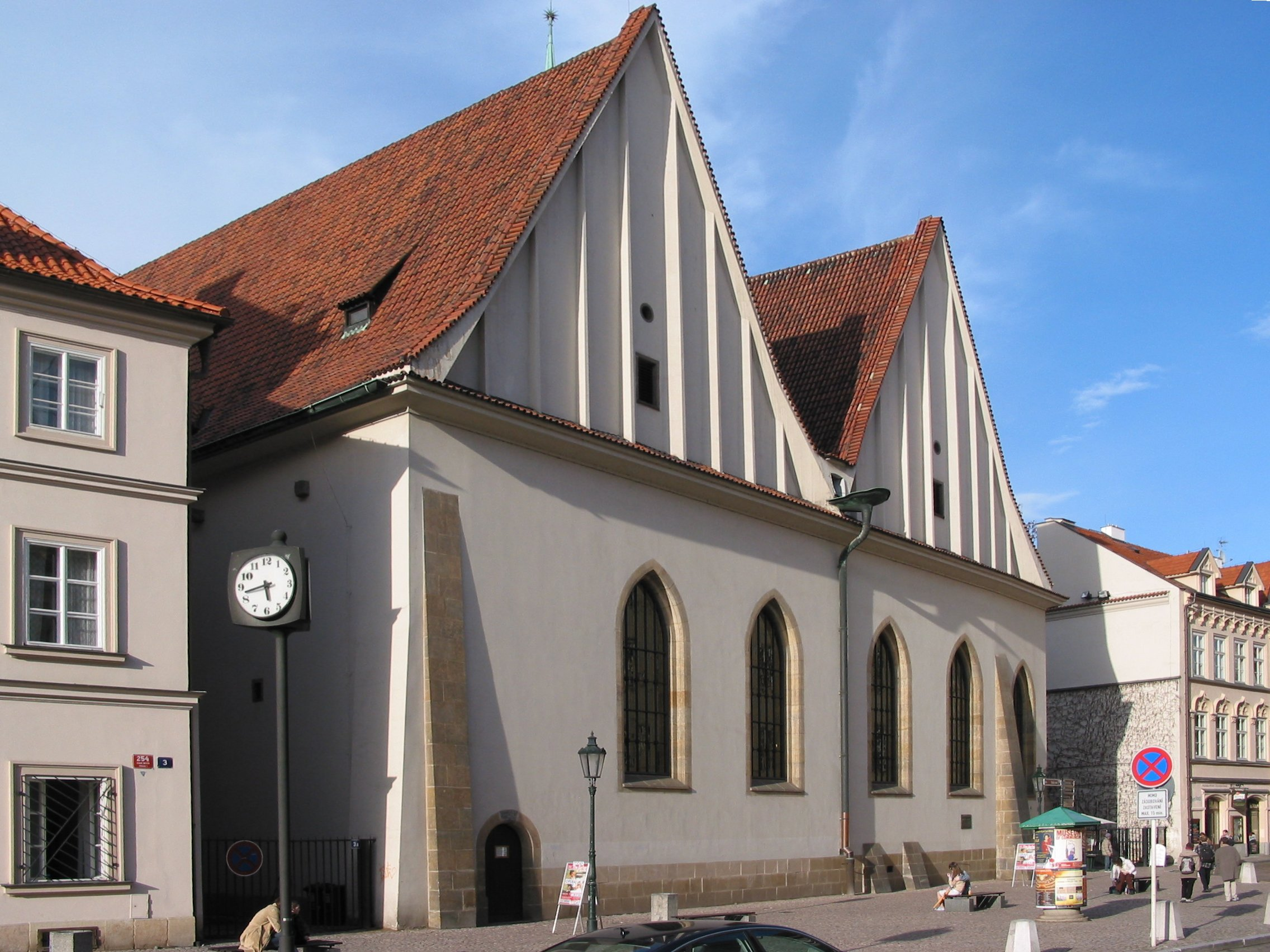
Front view

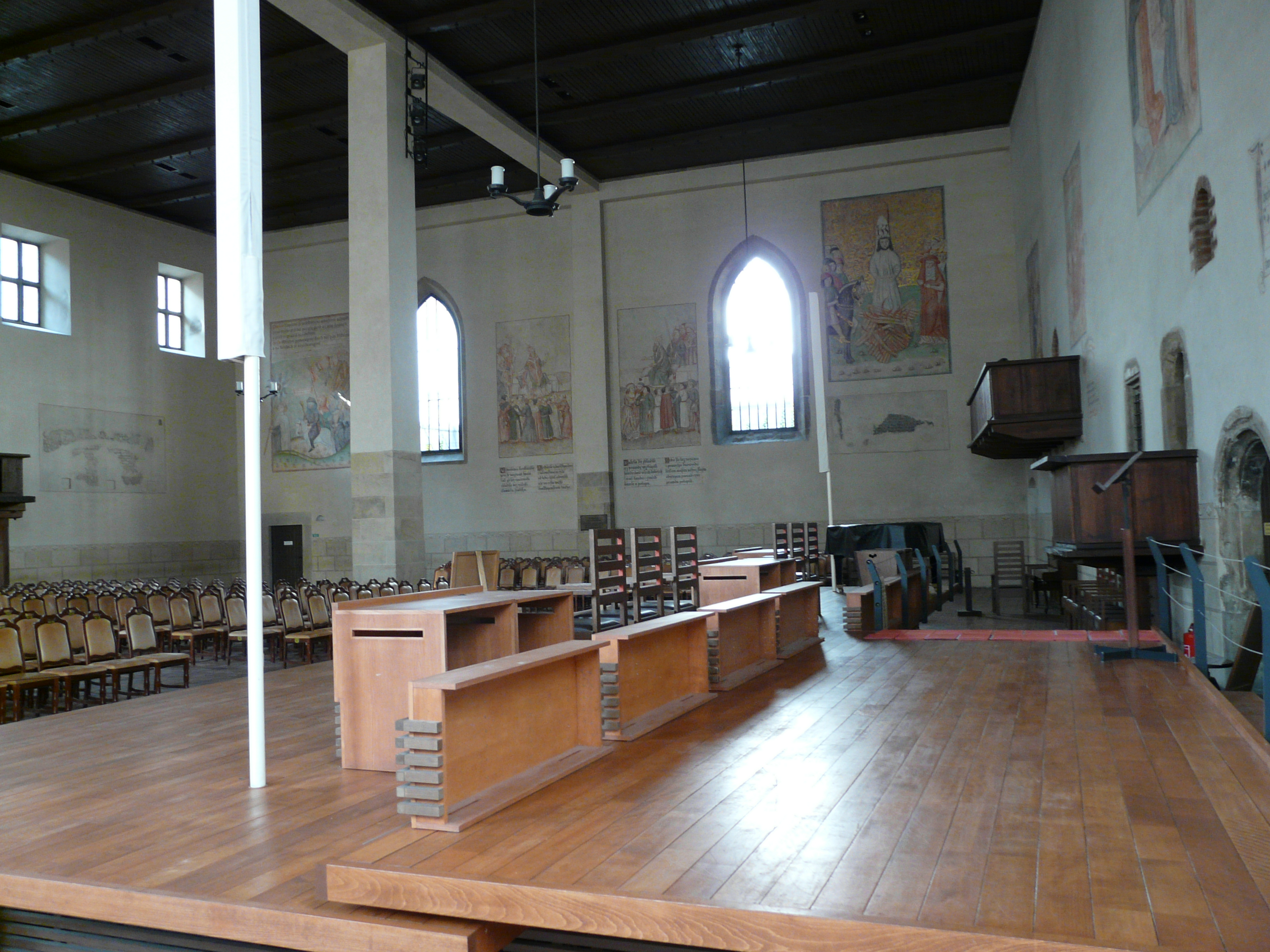
Interior of the chapel

The Bethlehem Chapel (Czech: Betlémská kaple) is a medieval religious building in the Old Town of Prague, Czech Republic. It is notable for its connection with the origins of the Bohemian Reformation, especially with the Czech reformer Jan Hus.

The chapel is named in honor of the Holy Innocents massacred in Bethlehem by Herod the Great in an attempt to kill the newborn Jesus Christ.

== History ==
The Bethlehem Chapel was founded in Prague in 1391 by Wenceslas Kříž (known as 'the Merchant'), and John of Milheim, and taught solely in the Czech vernacular, thus breaking with German domination of the Medieval Bohemian church. The building was never officially called a church, only a chapel, though it could contain 3,000 people; indeed, the chapel encroached upon the parish of Sts. Philip and James, and John of Milheim paid the pastor of that church 90 grossi as compensation.

Hus became a rector and a preacher in March 1402. After Hus's excommunication in 1412, the Pope ordered the Bethlehem chapel to be pulled down, although this action was rejected by the Czech majority on the Old Town council. After Hus's death, he was succeeded by Jacob of Mies.

In the 17th century, the building was acquired by the Jesuits. It fell into disrepair and in 1786 it was partly demolished. In 1836–1837, the surviving masonry was incorporated into a new apartment building. Under the Czechoslovak communist regime the building was restored by the government to its state at the time of Hus. Most of the chapel's exterior walls and a small portion of the pulpit date back to the medieval chapel. The wall paintings are largely from Hus's time there, and the text below is taken from his work De sex erroribus, and contrast the poverty of Christ with the riches of the Roman Catholic Church of Hus's time.

Asteroid 90892 Betlémská kaple, discovered by Czech astronomer Miloš Tichý at the Kleť Observatory in 1997, was named after the chapel. The official naming citation was published by the Minor Planet Center in Cambridge, Massachusetts on 3 February 2015 (M.P.C. 92390).

== See also ==
- List of Jesuit sites
