= Mount Fučík =

Mountain in Antarctica

Highest point
- Coordinates: 71°52′S 14°26′E

Mount Fučík is the central peak, 2,305 metres (7,560 ft) high, of Kvaevefjellet Mountain, in the Payer Mountains of Queen Maud Land, Antarctica. It was discovered and plotted from air photos by the Third German Antarctic Expedition, 1938–1939, and was mapped from air photos and surveys by the Sixth Norwegian Antarctic Expedition, 1956–1960. It was remapped by the Soviet Antarctic Expedition, 1960–1961, and named after Julius Fučík, a Czech journalist and author.
