= Hoel Mountains =

Mountain range of Queen Maud Land, Antarctica

- Location within Antarctica

Geography
- Continent: Antarctica
- Region: Queen Maud Land
- Range coordinates: 72°0′S 14°0′E

The Hoel Mountains are a group of mountains including the Weyprecht Mountains and the Payer Mountains in Queen Maud Land, Antarctica. They were first photographed from the air and plotted by the Third German Antarctic Expedition (1938–39), mapped by Norwegian cartographers from surveys and air photos by the Sixth Norwegian Antarctic Expedition (1956–60) and named for Adolf Hoel, a Norwegian geologist and Arctic explorer, leader and member of many expeditions to Greenland and Spitsbergen since 1907.
