= Jan Hus =

Czech theologian, philosopher, and martyr (c. 1369–1415)

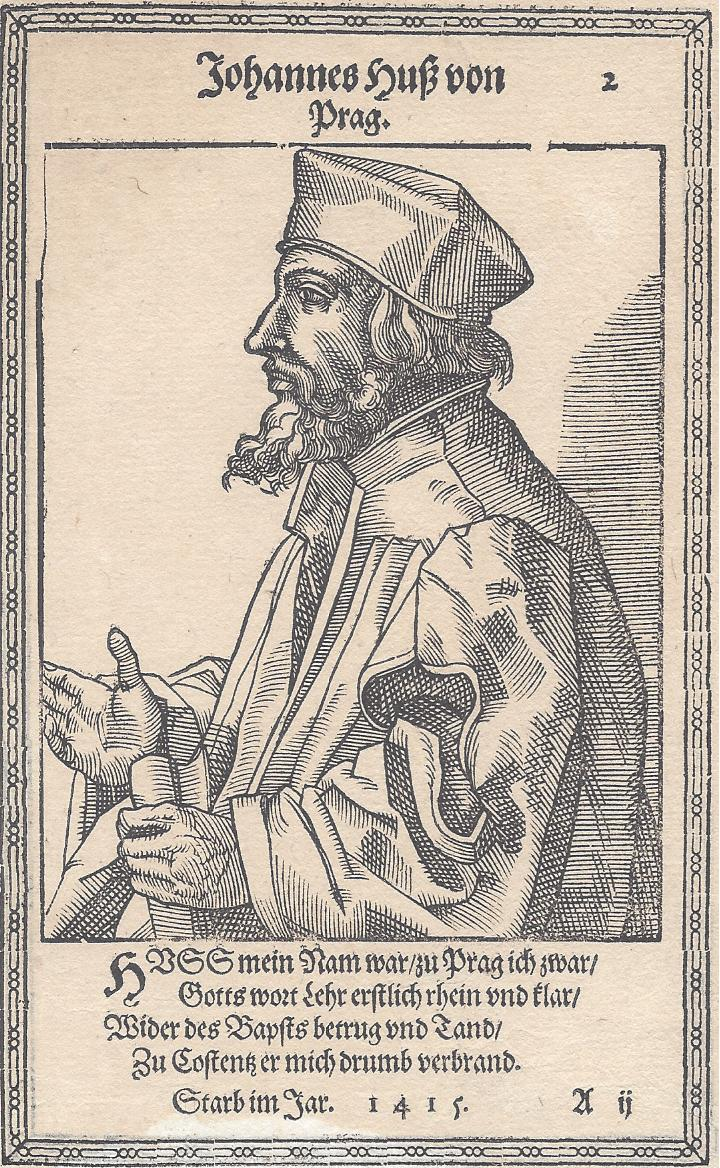
- Woodcut of Jan Hus, c. 1587
- Born: c. 1369; Husinec, Bohemia, Holy Roman Empire
- Died: 6 July 1415 (aged 45–46); Konstanz, Bishopric of Constance, Holy Roman Empire
- Cause of death: Execution by burning
- Other names: John Goose, John Huss

Education
- Education: University of Prague

Philosophical work
- Era: Renaissance philosophy
- Region: Western philosophy
- School: Hussite
- Main interests: Theology

Jan Hus (/hʊs/; Czech: [ˈjan ˈɦus]; c. 1369 – 6 July 1415), sometimes anglicized as John Hus or John Huss, and referred to in historical texts as Johannes Hus or Johannes Huss, was a Czech Christian theologian and philosopher who became a Church reformer and the inspiration of Hussitism, a key predecessor to Protestantism, and a seminal figure in the Bohemian Reformation. Hus is considered to be the first Church reformer, even though some designate the theorist John Wycliffe. (Note: "John Wycliffe may be thought of as the theorist of ecclesiastical Reformation, but Hus is considered the first church reformer, the antecedent of Luther, Calvin, and Zwingli, as such. His teachings had a strong influence on the states of Western Europe in the formation of a reformist Bohemian religious denomination and, more than a century later, on Martin Luther himself. Hus was burned at the stake for heresy against the teachings of the Roman Catholic Church, including those on ecclesiology, the Eucharist, and other theological dogma.") His teachings had a strong influence, most immediately in the rise of the Hussite reformed Bohemian religious denomination and, over a century later, on Martin Luther.

After being ordained as a Catholic priest, Hus began to preach in Prague. He opposed many doctrines and practices of the Catholic Church in Bohemia, such those concerning ecclesiology, simony, and the Eucharist. Hus was a master, dean, and rector at the Charles University in Prague between 1409 and 1410.

Alexander V, one of three popes during the Western Schism, issued a Papal bull excommunicating Hus, but it was not enforced and Hus continued to preach. He then spoke out against Alexander V's successor, Antipope John XXIII, for his selling of indulgences. Hus's excommunication was then enforced, and he spent the next two years in exile.

When the Council of Constance assembled to end the schism, Hus was summoned to defend his views on the dissension within the Church. When he arrived, he not only enjoyed the safe conduct to the city but "During the first few weeks of his residence in Constance, Hus enjoyed a tolerable share of liberty." He was later arrested and imprisoned, and eventually taken before the council and required to recant his views. He refused. On 6 July 1415, he was burned at the stake for heresy against the teachings of the Catholic Church.

After Hus' death, the followers of his doctrines (known as Hussites) refused to elect another Catholic monarch and defeated five consecutive papal crusades between 1420 and 1431 in the Hussite Wars. The Bohemian and Moravian populations remained majority Hussite until the 1620s, when a Protestant defeat in the Battle of the White Mountain resulted in the Lands of the Bohemian Crown coming under Habsburg dominion for the next 300 years, and subject to an intense campaign of enforced Catholic orthodoxy.

== Early life ==
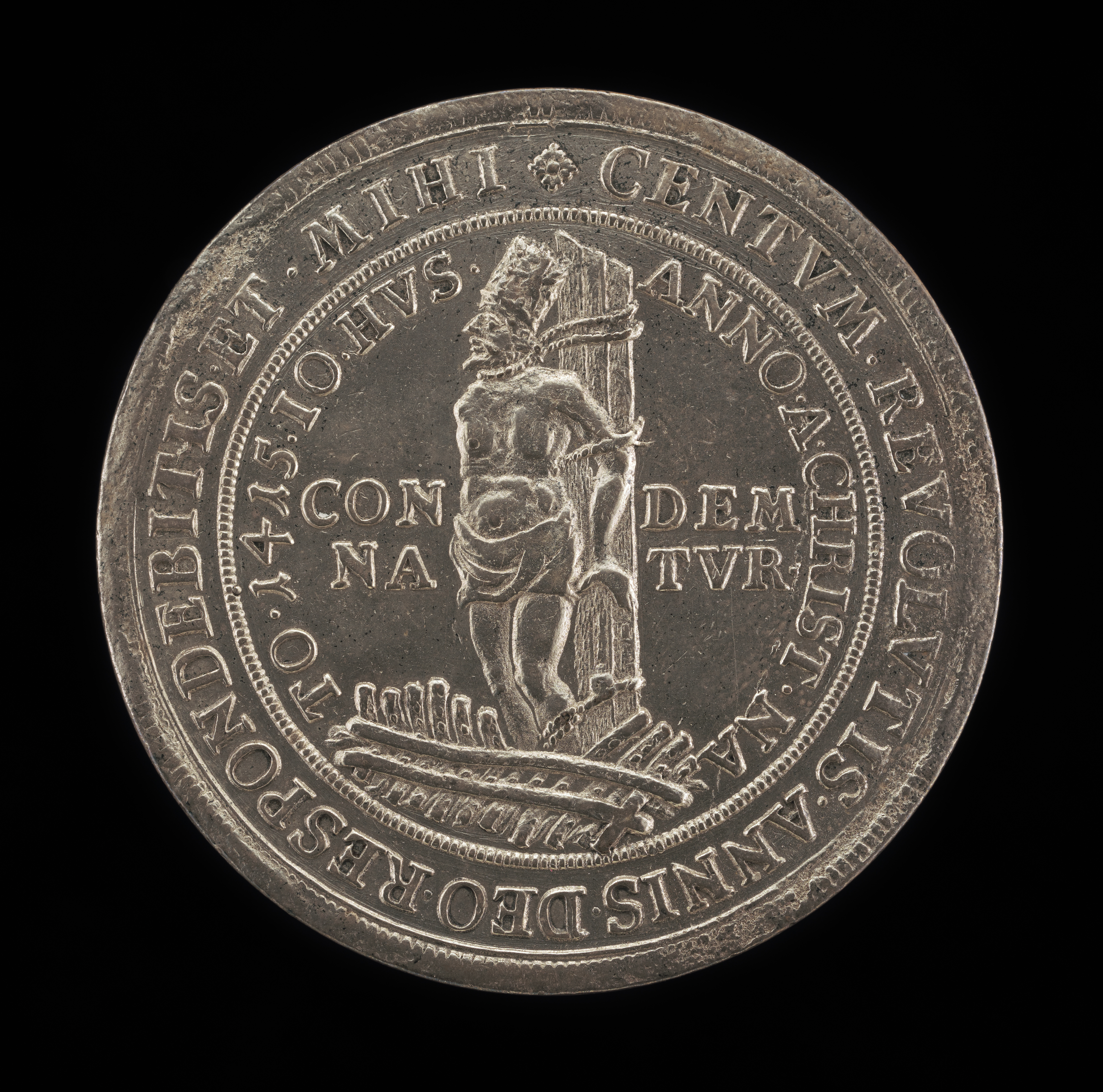
German 16th Century. John Huss Centenary Medal [reverse] . Silver, 4.33 cm. National Gallery of Art, Washington. Samuel H. Kress Collection

The exact date of Hus's birth is disputed. Some claim he was born around 1369, while others claim he was born between 1373 and 1375. Though older sources state the latter, more contemporary research states that 1372 is more likely. The belief that he was born on 6 July, also his death day, has no factual basis. Hus was born in Husinec, southern Bohemia (now the Czech Republic), to peasant parents. It is well known that Hus took his name from the village where he lived (Husinec). The reason behind his taking his name from his village rather than from his father is up to speculation; some believe that it was because Hus did not know of his father, while others say it was simply a custom at that time. The name Hus, however, means 'goose' in Bohemian (now called Czech), and he was a century later referenced as a "Bohemian goose" in a dream given to Frederick, the Elector of Saxony. Nearly all other information known about Hus's very early life is unsubstantiated. Similarly, we know little of Hus's family. His father's name was Michael; his mother's name is unknown. It is known that Hus had a brother due to his expressing concerns for his nephew while awaiting execution at Constance. Whether or not Hus had any other family is unknown.

At the age of roughly 10, Hus was sent away to a monastery. The exact reason is not known; some claim that his father had died, others say he went there due to his devotion to God. He impressed the teachers with his studies, and they recommended him to move to Prague, one of the largest cities in Bohemia at that time. Hus apparently supported himself by securing employment in Prague, which allowed him to fulfill his necessities and access to the Prague Library.

Three years later, he was admitted to the University of Prague. Though not an exceptional student, he pursued his studies with ferocity. In 1393, Hus earned a Bachelor of Arts degree at the University of Prague, and he earned his master's degree in 1396. The strongly anti-papal views that were held by many of the professors there likely influenced Hus's future works. During his studies, he served as a choir boy, to supplement his earnings.

== Career ==
Hus began teaching at the University of Prague in 1398, and in 1399, he first publicly defended propositions of Wycliffe. He was ordained as a Catholic priest in 1400. In 1401, his students and faculty promoted him to dean of the philosophy department, and a year later, he became a rector of the University of Prague. He was appointed a preacher at the Bethlehem Chapel in 1402. Hus was a strong advocate for the Czechs and the Realists, and he was influenced by the writings of John Wycliffe. Although Church authorities banned many of Wycliffe's works in 1403, Hus translated Trialogus into Czech and helped to distribute it.

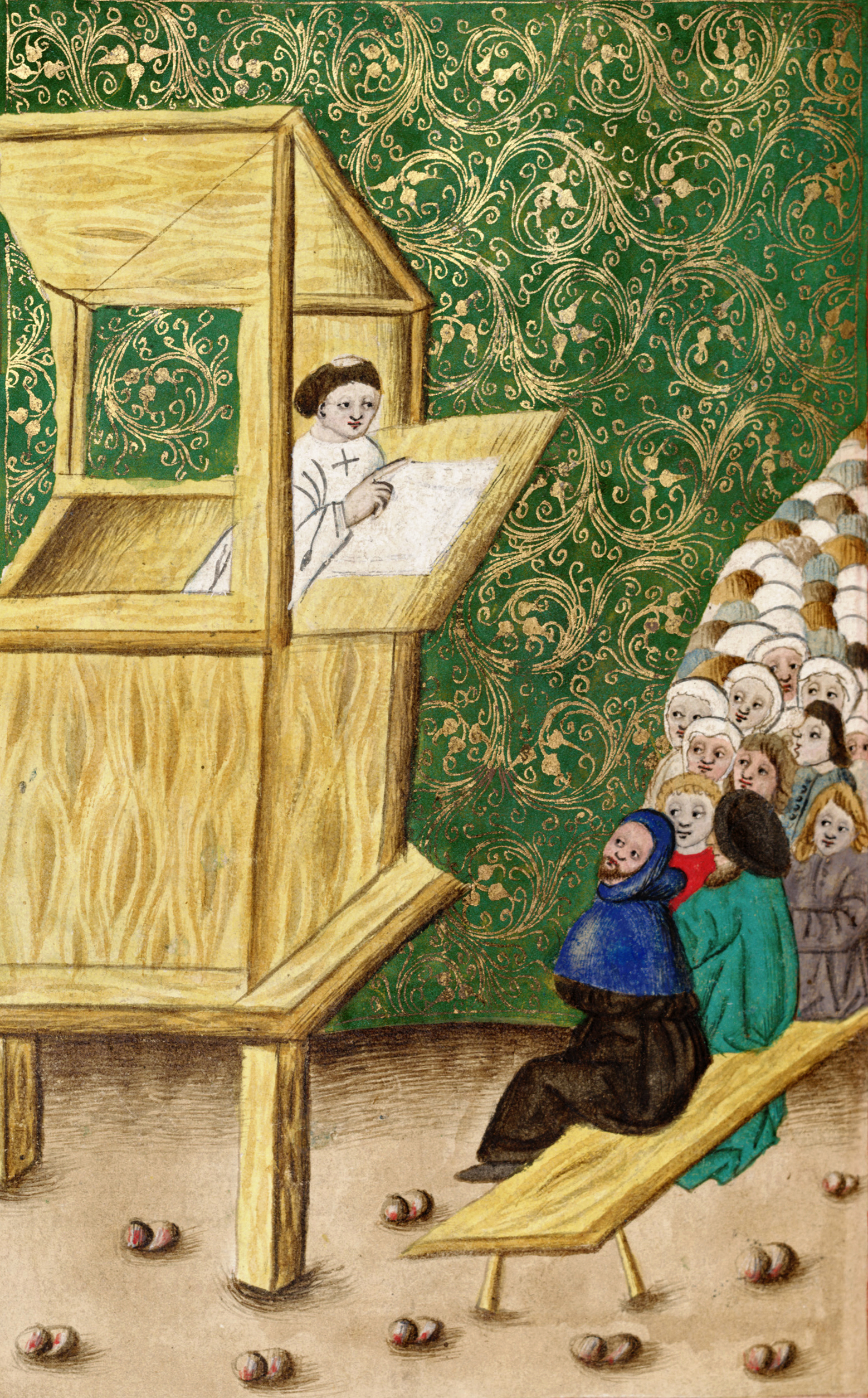
Jan Hus preaching, illumination from a Czech manuscript, 1490s

Hus denounced the moral failings of clergy, bishops, and even the papacy from his pulpit. Archbishop Zbyněk Zajíc tolerated this, and even appointed Hus a preacher at the clergy's biennial synod. On 24 June 1405, Pope Innocent VII directed the Archbishop to counter Wycliffe's teachings, especially the idea of impanation in the Eucharist. The archbishop complied by issuing a synod decree against Wycliffe, as well as forbidding any further attacks on the clergy.

In 1406, two Bohemian students brought to Prague a document bearing the seal of the University of Oxford and praising Wycliffe. Hus proudly read the document from his pulpit. Then, in 1408, Pope Gregory XII warned Archbishop Zajic that the Church in Rome had been informed of Wycliffe's heresies and of the sympathies of King Wenceslaus IV of Bohemia for nonconformists. In response, the king and university ordered all of Wycliffe's writings surrendered to the archdiocesan chancery for correction. Hus obeyed, declaring that he condemned the errors in those writings.

=== Papal Schism ===
In 1408, the Charles University in Prague was divided by the Western Schism, in which Gregory XII in Rome and Benedict XIII in Avignon both claimed the papacy. Wenceslaus felt Gregory XII might interfere with his plans to be crowned Holy Roman Emperor. He denounced Gregory, ordered the clergy in Bohemia to observe a strict neutrality in the schism, and said that he expected the same of the university. Archbishop Zajíc remained faithful to Gregory. At the University, only the scholars of the Bohemian "nation" (one of the four governing sections), with Hus as their leader, vowed neutrality.

==== Kutná Hora Decree ====
In January 1409, Wenceslaus summoned representatives of the four nations comprising the university to the Czech city of Kutná Hora to demand statements of allegiance. The Czech nation agreed, but the other three nations declined. The king then decreed that the Czech nation would have three votes in university affairs, while the "German nation" (composed of the former Bavarian, Saxon, and Polish nations) would have one vote in total. Due to the change in voting structure by May 1409, the German dean and rector were deposed and replaced by Czechs. The Palatine Elector called the Germans to his own University of Heidelberg, while the Margrave of Meissen started a new university in Leipzig. It is estimated that over one thousand students and masters left Prague. The emigrants also spread accusations of Bohemian heresy.

==== Antipope Alexander V ====
In 1409, the Council of Pisa tried to end the schism by electing Alexander V as Pope, but Gregory and Benedict did not submit (Alexander was declared an "antipope" by the Council of Constance in 1418). Hus, his followers, and Wenceslaus IV transferred their allegiance to Alexander V. Under pressure from King Wenceslaus IV, Archbishop Zajíc did the same. Zajíc then lodged an accusation of "ecclesiastical disturbances" against Wycliffites in Prague with Alexander V.

On 20 December 1409, Alexander V issued a papal bull that empowered the Archbishop to proceed against Wycliffism in Prague. All copies of Wycliffe's writings were to be surrendered and his views repudiated, and free preaching discontinued. After the publication of the bull in 1410, Hus appealed to Alexander V, but in vain. The Wycliffe books and valuable manuscripts were burned, and Hus and his adherents were excommunicated by Alexander V.

==== Crusade against Naples ====
Alexander V died in 1410 and was succeeded by John XXIII (also later declared an antipope). In 1411, John XXIII proclaimed a crusade against King Ladislaus of Naples, the protector of rival Pope Gregory XII. This crusade was preached in Prague as well. John XXIII also authorized indulgences to raise money for the war. Priests urged the people on, and they crowded into churches to give their offerings. This traffic in indulgences was a sign of the corruption of the Church needing remediation.

==== Condemnation of indulgences and Crusade ====
Archbishop Zajíc died in 1411, and with his death, the religious movement in Bohemia entered a new phase during which the disputes concerning indulgences assumed great importance. Hus spoke out against indulgences, but he could not carry with him the men of the university. In 1412, a dispute took place, on which occasion Hus delivered his address Quaestio magistri Johannis Hus de indulgentiis. It was taken literally from the last chapter of Wycliffe's book, De ecclesia, and his treatise, De absolutione a pena et culpa. Hus asserted that no pope or bishop had the right to take up the sword in the name of the Church; he should pray for his enemies and bless those who curse him; man obtains forgiveness of sins by true repentance, not money. The doctors of the theological faculty replied, but without success. A few days afterward, some of Hus's followers, led by Vok Voksa z Valdštejna, burned the Papal bulls. Hus, they said, should be obeyed rather than the Church, which they considered a fraudulent mob of adulterers and Simonists.

In response, three men from the lower classes who openly called the indulgences a fraud were beheaded. They were later considered the first martyrs of the Hussite Church. In the meantime, the faculty had condemned the forty-five articles of Wycliffe and added several other theses, deemed heretical, which had originated with Hus. The king forbade the teaching of these articles, but neither Hus nor the university complied with the ruling. They requested that the articles should first be proven to be unscriptural. The tumults at Prague had stirred up a sensation. Papal legates and Archbishop Albik tried to persuade Hus to give up his opposition to the papal bulls, and the king made an unsuccessful attempt to reconcile the two parties.

==== Attempts at reconciliation ====
King Wenceslaus IV made efforts to harmonize the opposing parties. In 1412, he convoked the heads of his kingdom for a consultation and, at their suggestion, ordered a synod to be held at Český Brod on 2 February 1412. The synod was instead held in the palace of the archbishops at Prague to exclude Hus from participation. Propositions were made to restore peace in the Church. Hus declared that Bohemia should have the same freedom regarding ecclesiastical affairs as other countries and that approbation and condemnation should therefore be announced only with the permission of the state power. This was the view of Wycliffe (Sermones, iii. 519, etc.).

There followed treatises from both parties, but no harmony was obtained. "Even if I should stand before the stake which has been prepared for me," Hus wrote at the time, "I would never accept the recommendation of the theological faculty." The synod did not produce any results, but the king ordered a commission to continue the work of reconciliation. The doctors of the university demanded that Hus and his followers approve the university's conception of the Church. According to this conception, the pope is the head of the Church and the Cardinals are the body of the Church. Hus protested vigorously. The Hussite party seems to have made a great effort toward reconciliation. To the article that the Roman Church must be obeyed, they added only "so far as every pious Christian is bound". Stanislav ze Znojma and Štěpán Páleč protested against this addition and left the convention; they were exiled by the king, with two others.

==== Hus leaves Prague and appeals to Jesus Christ ====
By this time, Hus's ideas had become widely accepted in Bohemia, and there was broad resentment against the Church hierarchy. The attack on Hus by the pope and archbishop caused riots in parts of Bohemia. King Wenceslaus IV and his government took the side of Hus, and the power of his adherents increased from day to day. Hus continued to preach in the Bethlehem Chapel. The churches of the city were put under the ban, and an interdict was pronounced against Prague. To protect the city, Hus left and went into the countryside, where he continued to preach and write.

Before Hus left Prague, he decided to take a step that gave a new dimension to his endeavors. He wanted to become a preacher and then taught at the university he studied at before. He no longer put his trust in an indecisive king, a hostile pope, or an ineffective council. On 18 October 1412, he appealed to Jesus Christ as the supreme judge. By appealing directly to the highest authority, Christ himself, he bypassed the laws and structures of the medieval Church. For the Bohemian Reformation, this step was as significant as the Ninety-five Theses posted in Wittenberg by Martin Luther in 1517.

After Hus left Prague for the country, he realized what a gulf there was between university education and theological speculation and the life of uneducated country priests and the laymen entrusted to their care. Therefore, he started to write many texts in Czech, such as the basics of the Christian faith or preachings, intended mainly for the priests whose knowledge of Latin was poor.

==== Writings of Hus and Wycliffe ====
Of the writings occasioned by these controversies, those of Hus on the Church, entitled De Ecclesia, were written in 1413 and have been most frequently quoted and admired or criticized, yet their first ten chapters are an epitome of Wycliffe's work of the same title and the following chapters are an abstract of another of Wycliffe's works (De potentate papae) on the power of the pope. Wycliffe had written his book to oppose the common position that the Church consisted primarily of the clergy, and Hus now found himself making the same point. He wrote his work at the castle of one of his protectors in Kozí Hrádek and sent it to Prague, where it was publicly read in the Bethlehem Chapel. It was answered by Stanislav ze Znojma and Štěpán z Pálče (also Štěpán Páleč) with treatises of the same title.

After the most vehement opponents of Hus had left Prague, his adherents occupied the whole ground. Hus wrote his treatises and preached in the neighborhood of Kozí Hrádek. Bohemian Wycliffism was carried into Poland, Hungary, Croatia, and Austria. But in January 1413, a general council in Rome condemned the writings of Wycliffe and ordered them to be burned.

Hus was also a musical composer. Many of his writings were adapted into musical pieces by other composers.

=== Council of Constance ===
King Wenceslaus's brother Sigismund of Hungary, who was "King of the Romans" (that is, head of the Holy Roman Empire though not then Emperor) and heir to the Bohemian crown, was anxious to put an end to religious dissension within the Church. To put an end to the papal schism and to take up the long-desired reform of the Church, he arranged for a general council to convene on 1 November 1414, at Konstanz (Constance). The Council of Constance (1414–1418) became the 16th ecumenical council recognized by the Catholic Church. Hus, willing to make an end to all dissensions, agreed to go to Constance, under Sigismund's promise of safe-conduct.

==== Imprisonment and preparations for trial ====
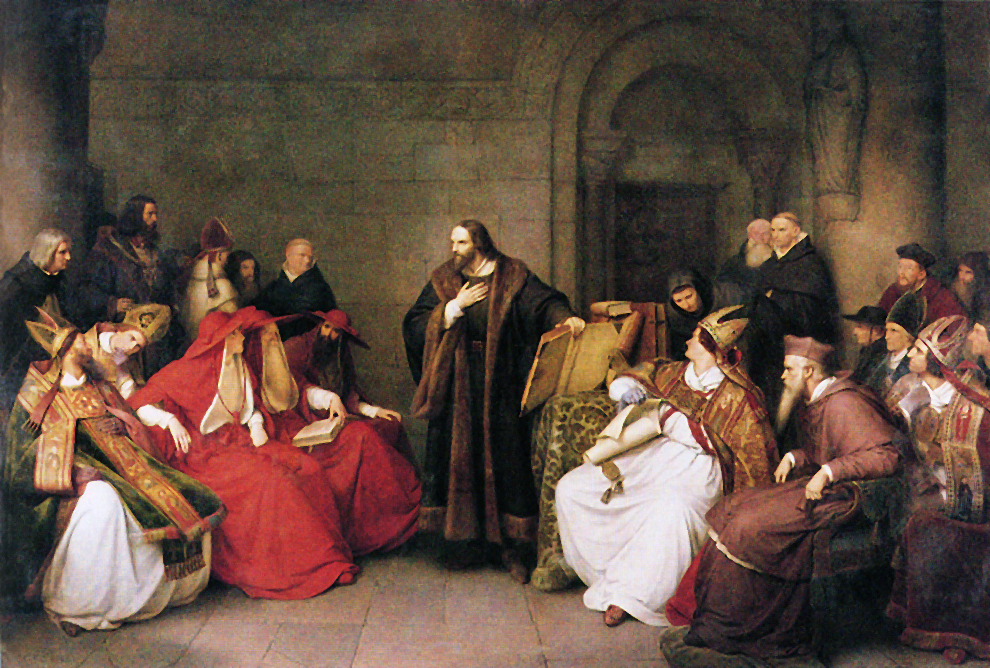
Jan Hus at the Council of Constance. 19th-century painting by Karl Friedrich Lessing

It is not known whether Hus knew what his fate would be; however, he made his will before setting out. He started on his journey on 11 October 1414, arriving in Constance on 3 November 1414. The following day, the bulletins on the church doors announced that Michal z Německého Brodu (Michal de Causis) would be opposing Hus. In the beginning, Hus was at liberty under his safe-conduct from Sigismund and lived at the house of a widow. But he continued celebrating Mass and preaching to the people, in violation of restrictions decreed by the Church. After a few weeks, on 28 November 1414, his opponents succeeded in imprisoning him on the strength of a rumor that he intended to flee. He was first brought into the residence of a canon and then on 6 December 1414 into the prison of the Dominican monastery. Sigismund, as the guarantor of Hus's safety, was greatly angered and threatened the prelates with dismissal. The prelates convinced him that he could not be bound by promises to a heretic.

On 4 December 1414, John XXIII entrusted a committee of three bishops with a preliminary investigation against Hus. As was common practice, witnesses for the prosecution were heard, but Hus was not allowed an advocate for his defense. His situation became worse after the downfall of John XXIII, who had left Constance to avoid abdicating. Hus had been the captive of John XXIII and in constant communication with his friends, but now he was delivered to the bishop of Constance and brought to his castle, Gottlieben on the Rhine. Here he remained for 73 days, separated from his friends, chained day and night, poorly fed, and ill.

=== Trial ===
On 5 June 1415, he was tried for the first time and was transferred to a Franciscan monastery, where he spent the last weeks of his life. Extracts from his works were read, and witnesses were heard. He refused all formulae of submission but declared himself willing to recant if his errors should be proven to him from the Bible. Hus conceded his veneration of Wycliffe and said that he could only wish his soul might some time attain unto that place where Wycliffe's was. On the other hand, he denied having defended Wycliffe's view of The Lord's Supper or the forty-five articles; he had only opposed their summary condemnation. King Sigismund admonished him to deliver himself up to the mercy of the council, as he did not desire to protect a heretic.

At the last trial, on 8 June 1415, thirty-nine sentences were read to him. Of these, twenty-six had been excerpted from his book on the Church (De ecclesia), seven from his treatise against Páleč (Contra Palecz), and six from that against Stanislav ze Znojma (Contra Stanislaum). The danger of some of these views to worldly power was explained to Sigismund to incite him against Hus. Hus again declared himself willing to submit if he could be convinced of errors. This declaration was considered an unconditional surrender, and he was asked to confess: 1. That he had erred in the theses which he had hitherto maintained; 2. That he renounced them for the future; 3. That he recanted them; and 4. That he declared the opposite of these sentences.

He asked to be exempted from recanting teachings that he had never taught. Other views, which the assembly considered erroneous, he was not willing to revoke, and to act differently would be against his conscience. These words found no favorable reception. After the trial on 8 June, several other attempts were purportedly made to induce him to recant, which he resisted.

==== Condemnation ====
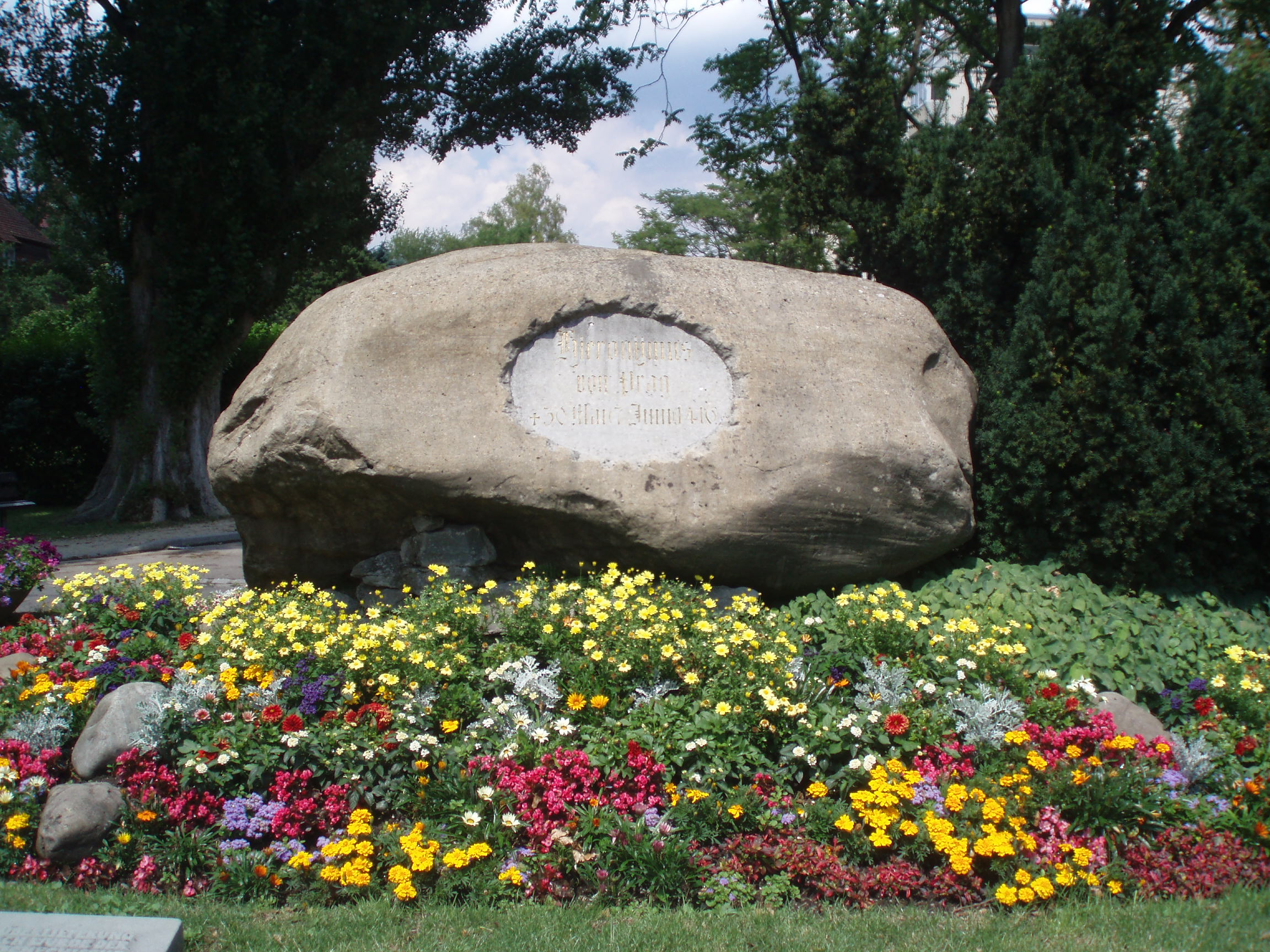
The monument in Konstanz, where reformer Jan Hus was executed (1862)

The condemnation of Jan Hus took place on 6 July 1415 in the presence of the assembly of the council in the cathedral. After the High Mass and Liturgy, Hus was led into the church. The Bishop of Lodi (then Giacomo Balardi Arrigoni) delivered an oration on the duty of eradicating heresy; various theses of Hus and Wycliffe and a report of his trial were then read.

An Italian prelate pronounced the sentence of condemnation upon Hus and his writings. Hus protested, saying that even at this hour he did not wish anything but to be convinced from Scripture. He fell upon his knees and asked God with a soft voice to forgive all his enemies. Then followed his degradation from the priesthood. He was dressed in priestly vestments and again asked to recant, and again he refused. With curses, Hus's ornaments were taken from him, his priestly tonsure was destroyed. The judgment of the Church was pronounced:

This holy synod of Constance, seeing that God’s church has nothing more that it can do, relinquishes John Hus to the judgment of the secular authority and decrees that he is to be relinquished to the secular court.

— Council of Constance, Session 15 – 6 July 1415

A tall paper hat was allegedly put upon his head with the inscription "Haeresiarcha" (i.e., the leader of a heretical movement). Hus was led away to the stake under a strong guard of armed men.

Before his execution, Hus is said to have declared, "You may kill a weak goose [Hus is Czech for "goose"], but more powerful birds, eagles and falcons, will come after me." Luther modified the statement and reported that Hus had said that they might have roasted a goose, but that in a hundred years a swan would sing to whom they be forced to listen. In 1546, in his funeral sermon for Luther, Johannes Bugenhagen gave a further twist to Hus's declaration: "You may burn a goose, but in a hundred years will come a swan you will not be able to burn." Twenty years later, in 1566, Johannes Mathesius, Luther's first biographer, found Hus's prophecy to be evidence of Luther's divine inspiration.

=== Execution ===
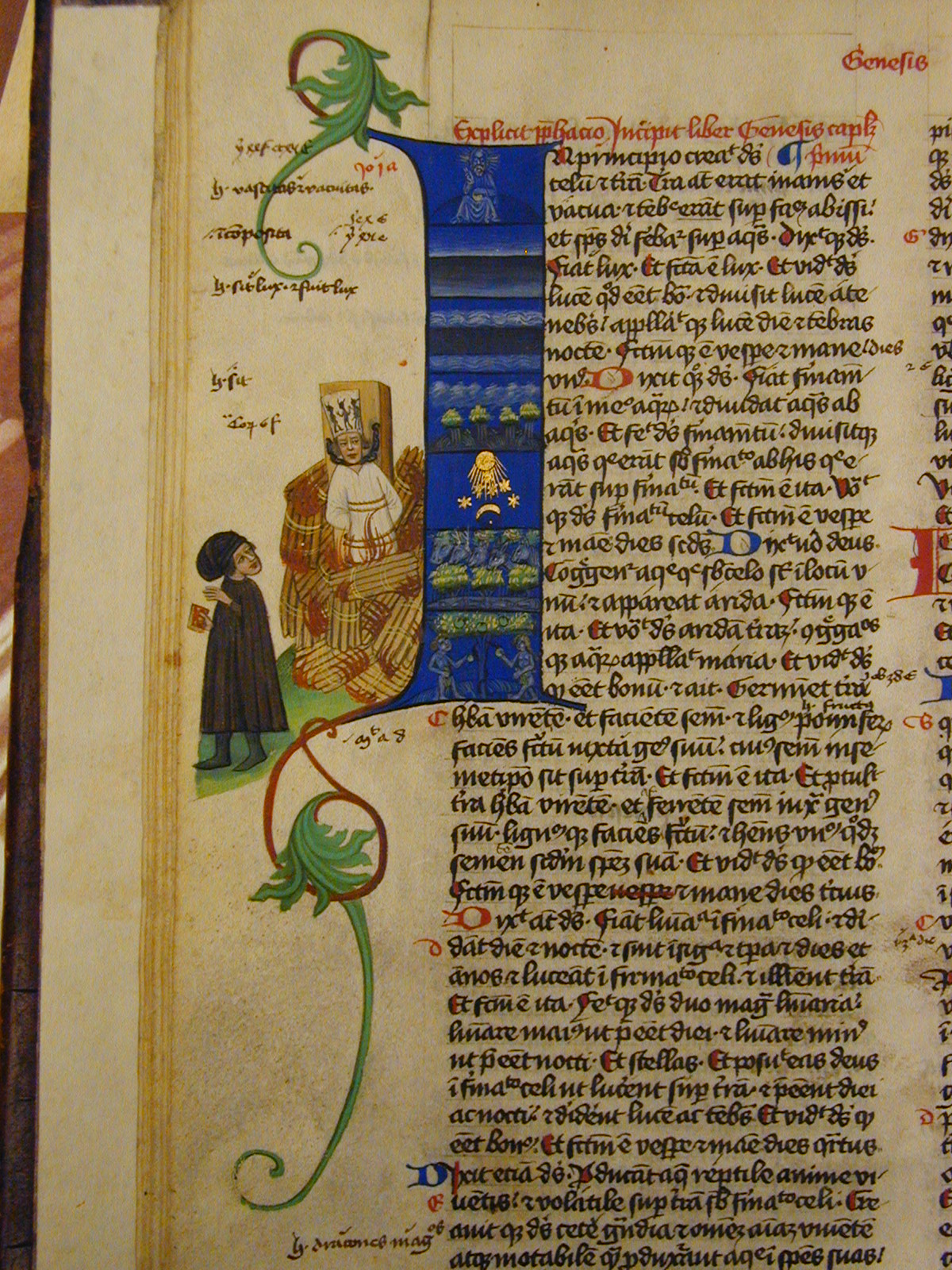
The oldest-known representation of Jan Hus is from the Martinická Bible 1430.

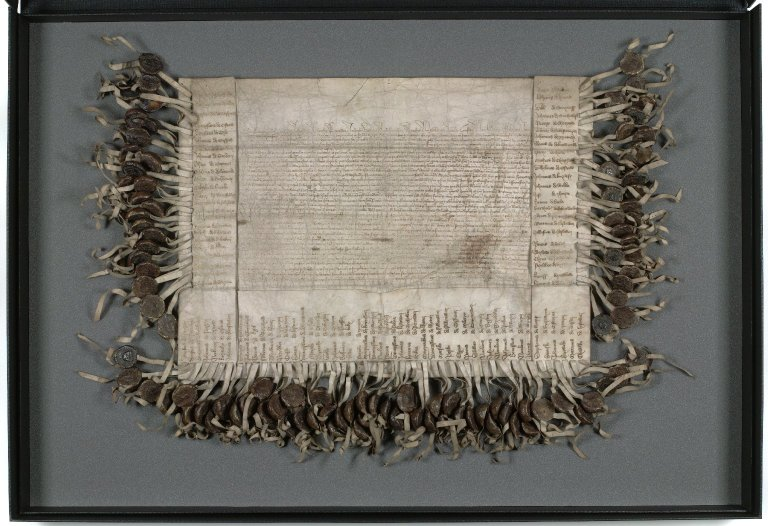
The last surviving copy of the famous protest of the Bohemian nobles against the burning of the religious reformer Jan Hus in 1415

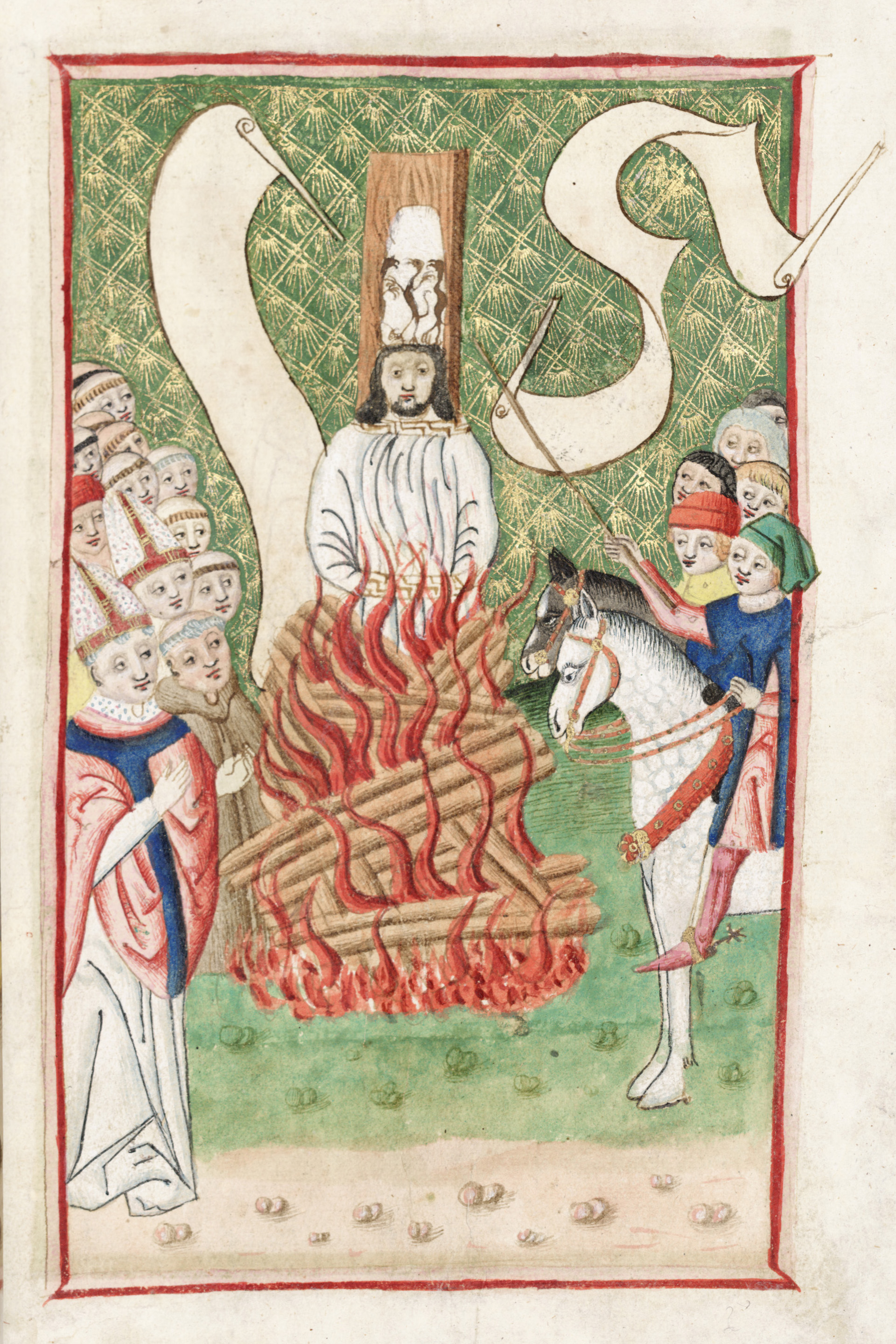
Jan Hus at the stake, Jena codex (c. 1500)

At the place of execution, he knelt, spread out his hands, and prayed aloud. The executioner undressed Hus and tied his hands behind his back with ropes. His neck was bound with a chain to a stake around which wood and straw had been piled up so that it covered him to the neck. At the last moment, the imperial marshal, von Pappenheim, in the presence of the Count Palatine, asked Hus to recant and thus save his own life. Hus declined, stating:

God is my witness that the things charged against me I never preached. In the same truth of the Gospel which I have written, taught, and preached, drawing upon the sayings and positions of the holy doctors, I am ready to die today.

Anecdotally, it has been said that the executioners had trouble intensifying the fire. An old woman then came to the stake and threw a relatively small amount of brushwood on it. Upon seeing her act, a suffering Hus then exclaimed, "O Sancta Simplicitas!" ("O holy simplicity!"). It is said that when he was about to expire, he cried out, "Christ, son of the Living God, have mercy on us!" (a variant of the Jesus Prayer). Hus's ashes were later thrown into the Rhine river as a means of preventing the veneration of his remains.

== Aftermath ==
=== Bohemian Protest ===
As news of Hus's death spread, outrage was brewing among the local nobles and doctors. On 2 September 1415, a document now called the Bohemian Protest was signed with corresponding attached wax seals by 100 notable people from Bohemia and Moravia in protest of Jan Hus's burning. There is evidence that four documents of this kind were made in total, however only this one is known to survive and is currently held at the University of Edinburgh. The text of the Protest states that "Master John Hus was a good, just, and catholic man" who "consistently detested all error and heresies", and that anyone who believed that heresy was arising within Bohemia or Moravia was "the worst of traitors".

=== Hussite Wars ===
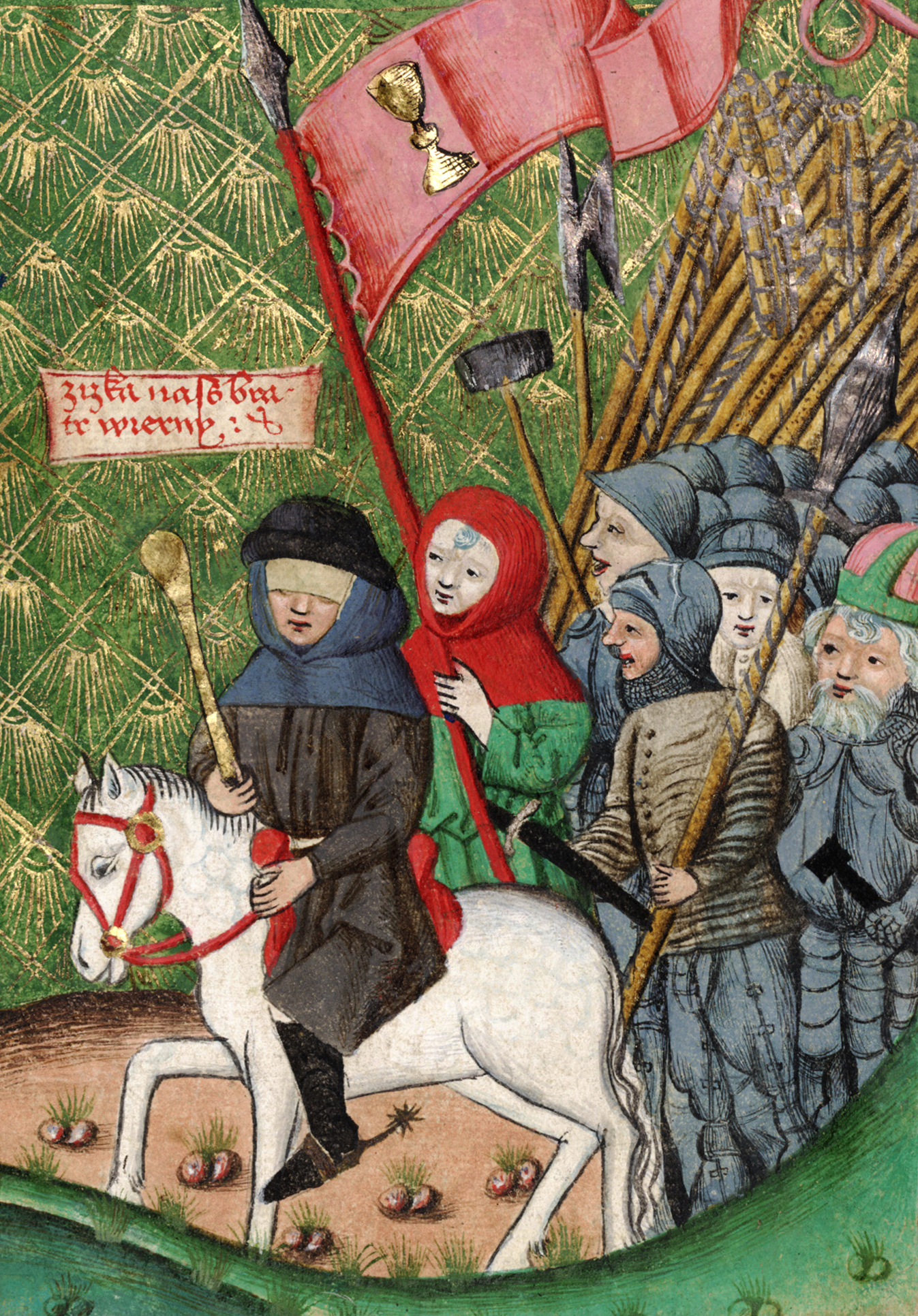
Jan Žižka leading troops of Hussites

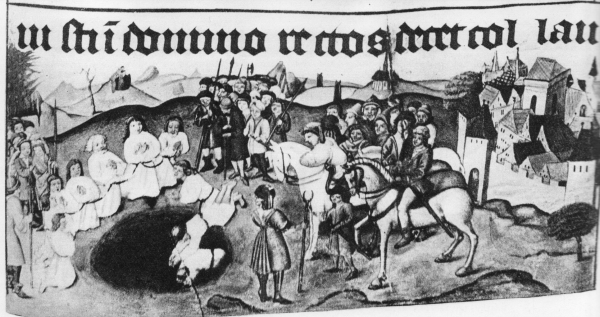
Some two thousand of Hus's followers thrown into the Kutná Hora mines by pro-Catholic townsmen

Responding with horror to the execution of Hus, the people of Bohemia moved even more rapidly away from Papal teachings. Rome then pronounced a crusade against them (1 March 1420): Pope Martin V issued a Papal bull authorizing the execution of all supporters of Hus and Wycliffe. King Wenceslaus IV died in August 1419, and his brother, Sigismund of Hungary, was unable to establish a real government in Bohemia due to the Hussite revolt.

The Hussite community included most of the Czech population of the Kingdom of Bohemia. Under the leadership of Jan Žižka (c. 1360–1424) and later of Prokop the Great (c. 1380–1434)—both excellent commanders—the Hussites defeated the crusade and the other three crusades that followed (1419–1434). Fighting ended after a compromise between the Utraquist Hussites and the Catholic Council of Basel in 1436. It resulted in the Basel Compacts, in which the Catholic Church officially allowed Bohemia to practice its own version of Christianity (Hussitism). A century later, as much as ninety percent of the inhabitants of the Czech Crown lands still followed Hussite teachings.

=== Hus's scholarship and teachings ===
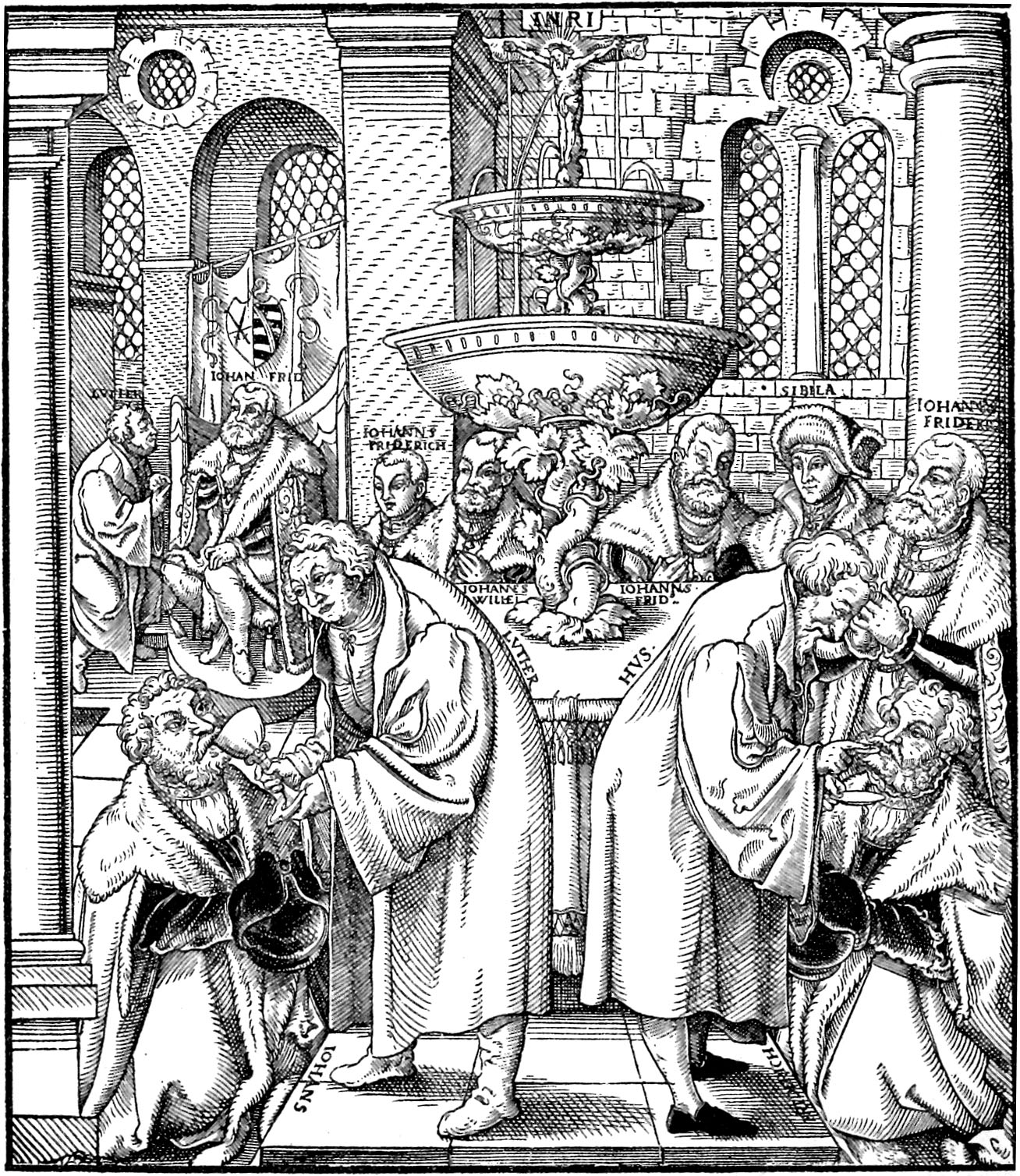
Luther and Hus serving Communion under both kinds together; picture from 16th-century Saxony demonstrating the affinity of Lutherans with Hussites

Hus left reformatory writings. He translated Wycliffe's Trialogus and was very familiar with his works on the body of Jesus, the Church, and the power of the pope, as well as and especially with his sermons. There are reasons to suppose that Wycliffe's view of the Lord's Supper (consubstantiation rather than transubstantiation) had spread to Prague as early as 1399, with strong evidence that students returning from England had brought the work back with them. It gained an even wider circulation after it had been prohibited in 1403, and Hus preached and taught it. The view was seized eagerly by the Taborites, who made it the central point of their system. According to their book, the Church is not the clerical hierarchy that was generally accepted as 'the Church'; the Church is the entire body of those who from eternity have been predestined for salvation. Christ, not the pope, is its head. It is no article of faith that one must obey the pope to be saved. Neither internal membership in the Church nor churchly offices and dignities is a surety that the persons in question are members of the true Church.

Hus's efforts were designed to rid the Church of its ethical abuses. The seeds of the Reformation are clear in Hus's and Wycliffe's writings. In explaining the plight of the average Christian in Bohemia, Hus wrote, "One pays for confession, for Mass, for the sacrament, for indulgences, for churching a woman, for a blessing, for burials, for funeral services and prayers. The very last penny that an old woman has hidden in her bundle for fear of thieves or robbery will not be saved. The villainous priest will grab it." After Hus's death, his followers, known as Hussites, split off into several groups including the Utraquists, Taborites and Orphans.

=== Apology of the Catholic Church ===
Nearly six centuries later in 1999, Pope John Paul II expressed "deep regret for the cruel death inflicted" on Hus and added "deep sorrow" for Hus's death and praised his "moral courage". Cardinal Miloslav Vlk of the Czech Republic was instrumental in crafting John Paul II's statement. Members of the Moravian Church believe that it remains for God to judge those who were involved in the death of Hus.

=== Hus and the Czech language ===
The works of Jan Hus incorporate reforms to medieval Czech orthography, including the "hook" (háček) diacritic which was used to form the graphemes ⟨č⟩, ⟨ě⟩, ⟨š⟩, ⟨ř⟩ and ⟨ž⟩, which replaced digraphs like ⟨cz⟩, ⟨ie⟩, ⟨sch⟩, ⟨rz⟩ and ⟨zs⟩; the "dot" above letters for strong accent, as well as the acute accent to mark long vowels ⟨á⟩, ⟨é⟩, ⟨í⟩, ⟨ó⟩, and ⟨ú⟩, in order to represent each phoneme by a single symbol. Some sources mention documented use of the special symbols in Bible translations (1462), the Schaffhausen Bible, and handwritten notes in the Bible. The symbol ⟨ů⟩ (instead of ⟨uo⟩) came later. The book Orthographia Bohemica (1406) was attributed to Hus by František Palacký, but it is possible that it was compiled by another author from Charles University.

== Legacy ==
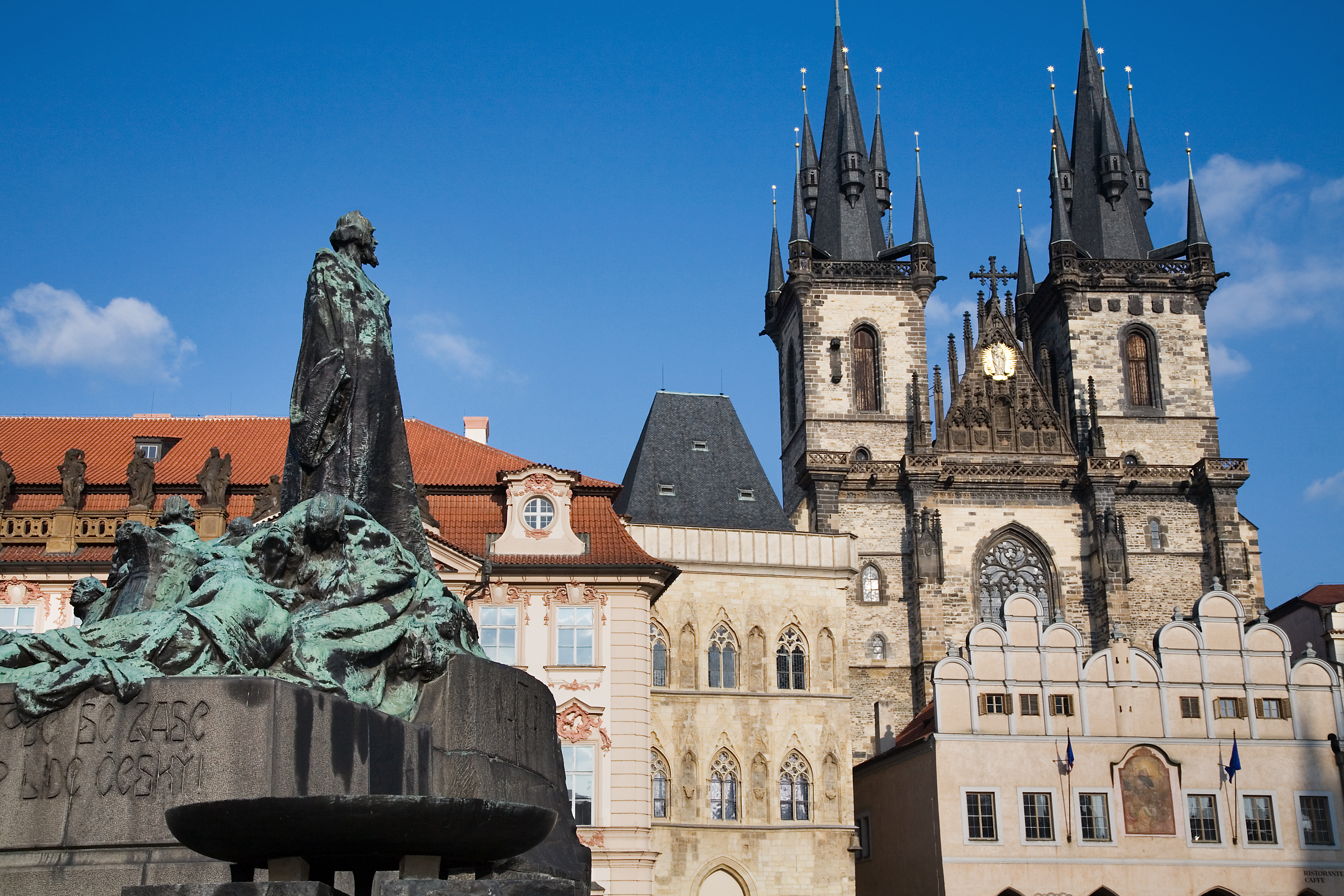
Jan Hus Memorial at Old Town Square in Prague built in 1915

A century after the Hussite Wars began, as many as 90% of inhabitants of the Czech lands were Hussites (although in the Utraquist tradition following a joint Utraquist—Catholic victory in the Hussite Wars). Bohemia was the site of one of the most significant pre-reformation movements, and there are still Protestant adherents remaining in modern times, though they no longer comprise the majority: suggested historical reasons include the persecution of Protestants by the Catholic Habsburgs, particularly after the Battle of White Mountain in 1620; restrictions during the Communist rule; and also the ongoing secularization. Modern Czechs exhibit very high distrust of religious and other institutions.

Jan Hus was a key contributor to Protestantism, whose teachings had a strong influence on the states of Europe and on Martin Luther. The Hussite Wars resulted in the Basel Compacts, which allowed for a reformed Church in the Kingdom of Bohemia—almost a century before such developments would take place in the Lutheran Reformation. The Unitas Fratrum (or Moravian Church) is the modern-day home of Hus's followers. Hus's extensive writings earned him a prominent place in Czech literary history.

In 1883, the Czech composer Antonín Dvořák composed his Hussite Overture based on melodies used by Hussite soldiers. It was often performed by the German conductor Hans von Bülow.

Professor Tomáš Garrigue Masaryk used Hus's name in his speech at Geneva University on 6 July 1915, for defense against Austria and in July 1917 for the title of the first corps of troops of his legions in Russia.

Today, the Jan Hus Memorial is located at the Prague Old Town Square (Czech: Staroměstské náměstí), and there are many smaller memorials in other towns throughout the Czech Republic.

In New York City, a church in Brooklyn (located at 153 Ocean Avenue) and a church and a theatre in Manhattan (located at 351 East 74th Street) are named for Hus, the John Hus Moravian Church and the Jan Hus Playhouse, respectively. Although Manhattan's church and theatre share a single building and management, the playhouse's productions are usually nonreligious or nondenominational.

A statue of Jan Hus was erected at the Union Cemetery in Bohemia, New York (on Long Island), by Czech immigrants in 1893.

In contrast to the popular perception that Hus was a proto-Protestant, some Eastern Orthodox Christians have argued that his theology was far closer to Eastern Orthodox Christianity. Jan Hus is considered a martyr saint in some jurisdictions of the Orthodox Church. The Czechoslovak Hussite Church claims to trace its origin to Hus, to be "neo-Hussite", and contains mixed Eastern Orthodox and Protestant elements. Nowadays, he is considered a saint by the Orthodox churches of Greece, Cyprus, Czechoslovakia, and several others.

Hus was voted the greatest hero of the Czech nation in a 2015 survey by Czech Radio.

== In popular culture ==
The lives of Hus and Petr Chelčický are the subject of the 2014 Hus a Chelčický book for older children, written and illustrated by Renáta Fučíková. The book won the Association of Czech Graphic Artists' HOLLAR award for its illustrations.

In the video games Europa Universalis IV and Europa Universalis V, Bohemia may convert to the Hussite faith, with unique mechanics and goals.

=== Holidays commemorating Hus ===
- Moravian Church – 6 July. Members of the Unitas Fratrum and Czech Brethren claim Hus as a spiritual forerunner.
- – Jan Hus Day (Den upálení mistra Jana Husa, literally: The day of burning of Master Jan Hus) on 6 July, the anniversary of Hus's martyrdom. It is a public holiday in the Czech Republic.
- (United States) He is also commemorated as a martyr on the Calendar of Saints of the Evangelical Lutheran Church in America.

== Famous followers of Jan Hus ==
- Jerome of Prague, Hus's friend and devoted follower, shared his fate and on 30 May 1416 was also burned at Konstanz
- Jan Kardinál z Rejnštejna (1375–1428) (German: Johannes Cardinalis von Bergreichenstein)
- Jan Žižka z Trocnova a Kalicha (c. 1360 – 1424), Czech general and Hussite leader
- Matěj z Knína (died 26 March 1410) (in German: Matthäus von Knin)
- Mikuláš of Pelhřimov (1385 Pelhřimov – 1460 Poděbrady) (in Latin: Nicolaus Pilgramensis, in German: Nikolaus von Pelgrims)
- John Amos Comenius (1592–1670) (Czech: Jan Amos Komenský) – pastor, teacher, philosopher, educator, and writer. The last bishop of Unitas Fratrum before its renewal (as the Moravian Church). Early champion of universal education, and education in one's mother language.

== Gallery ==
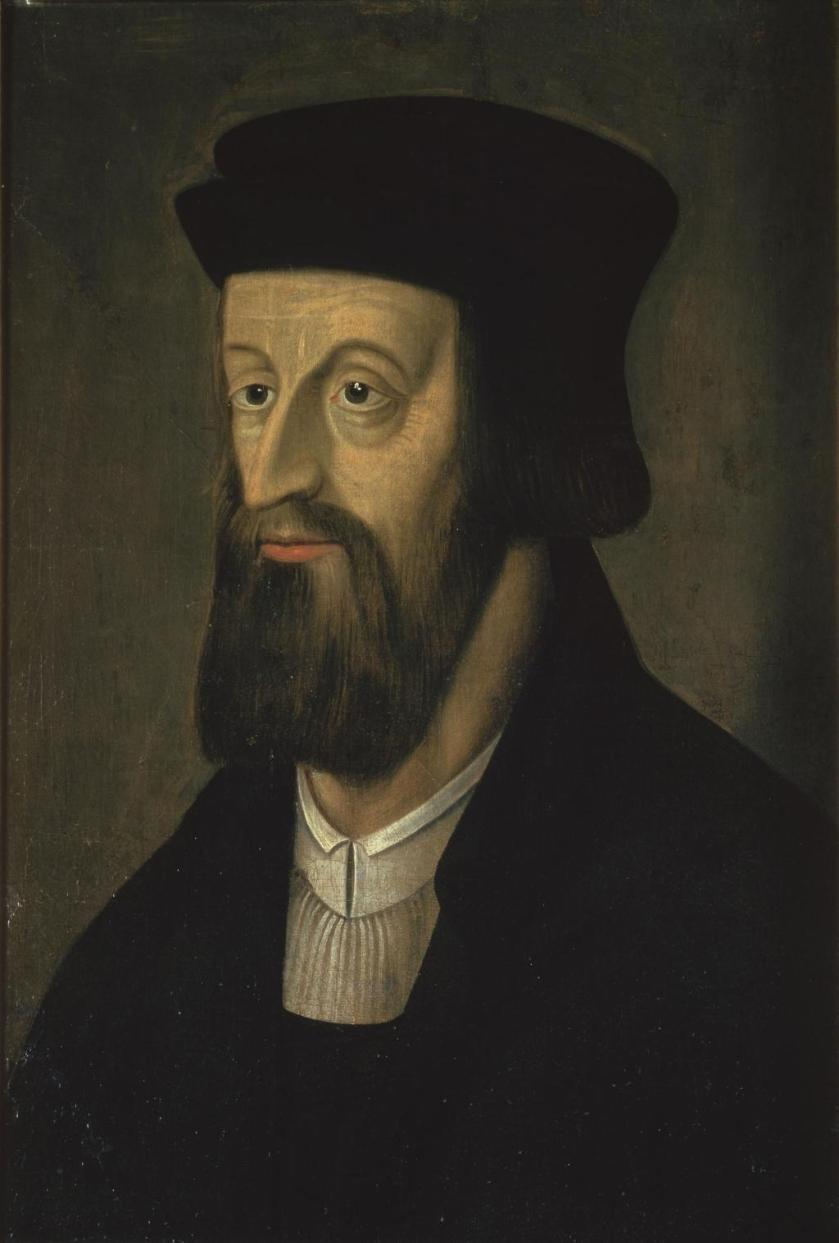
Portrait of Jan Hus, 16th century

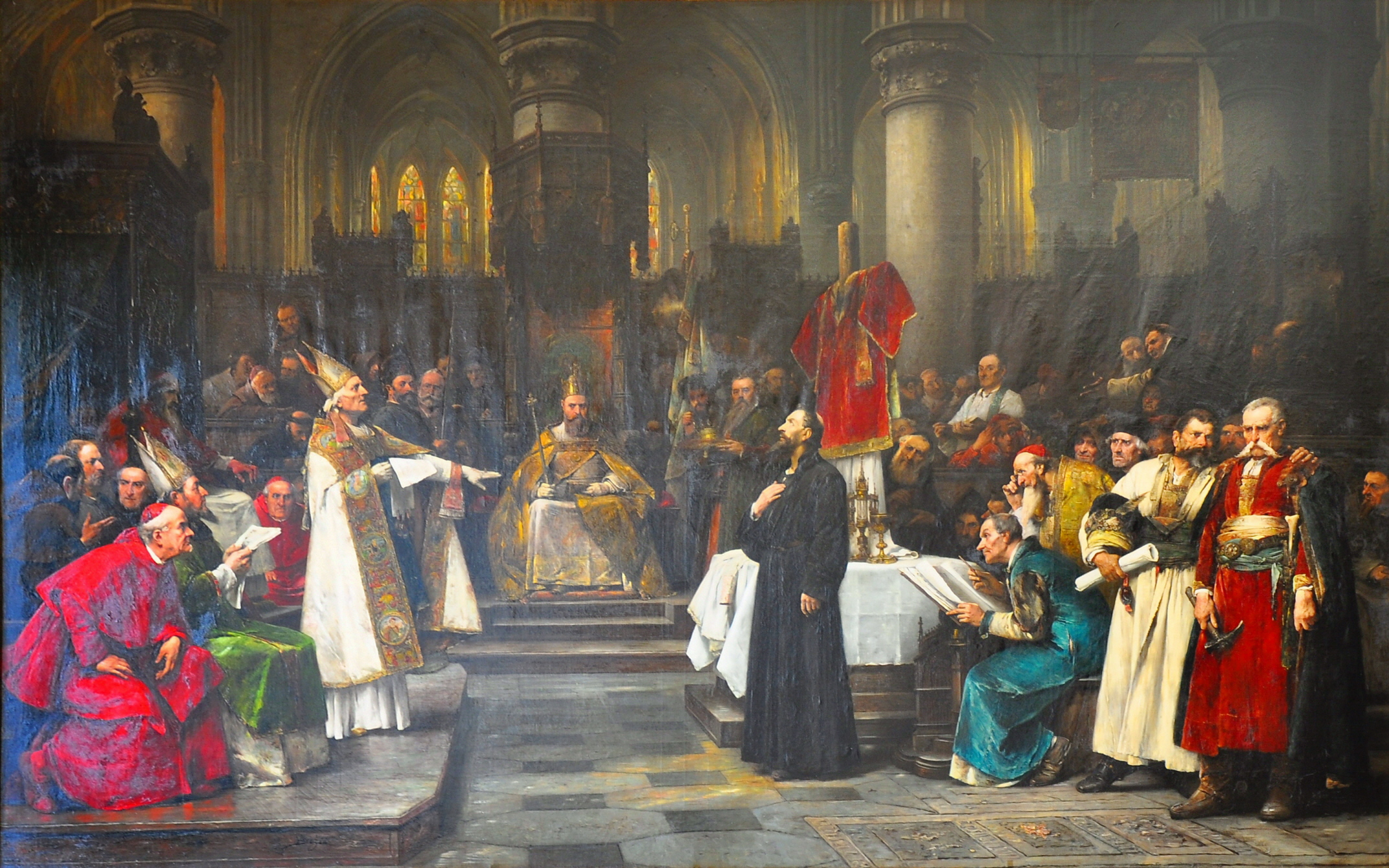
Painting of Jan Hus at the Council of Constance by Václav Brožík (1883)

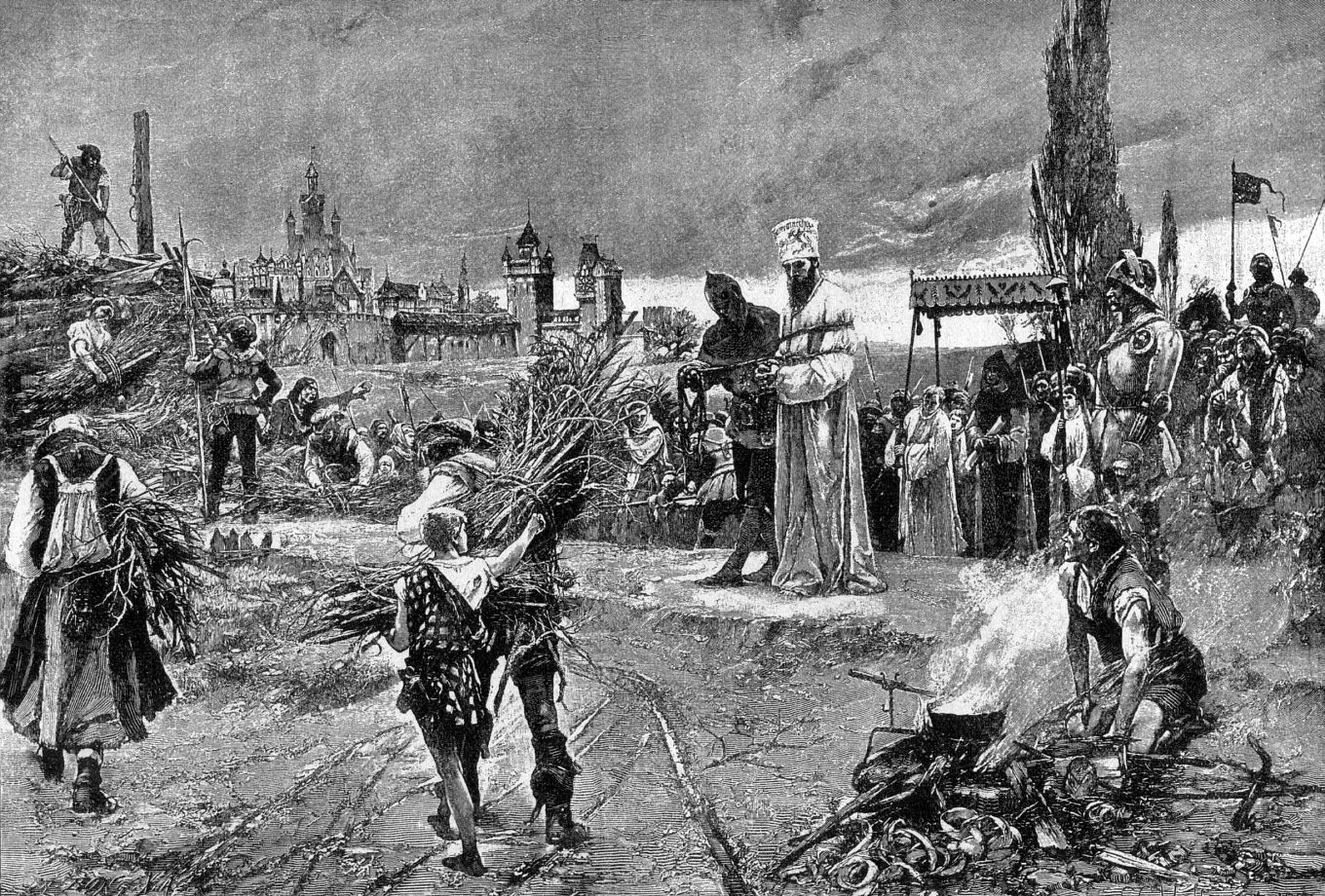
Preparing the execution of Jan Hus

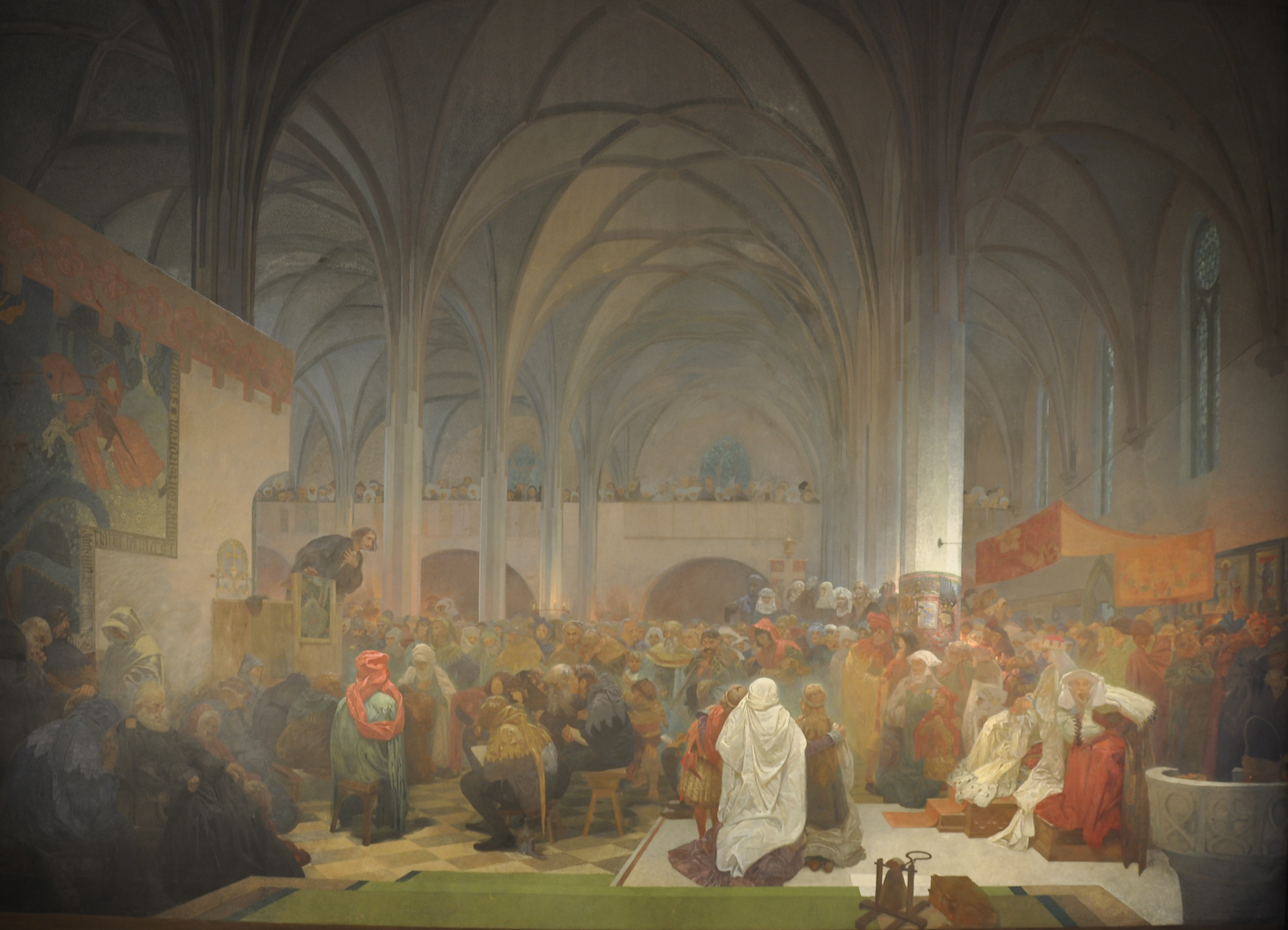
Alphonse Mucha: Master Jan Hus Preaching at the Bethlehem Chapel: Truth prevails, 1916; part of the 20-painting work, The Slav Epic

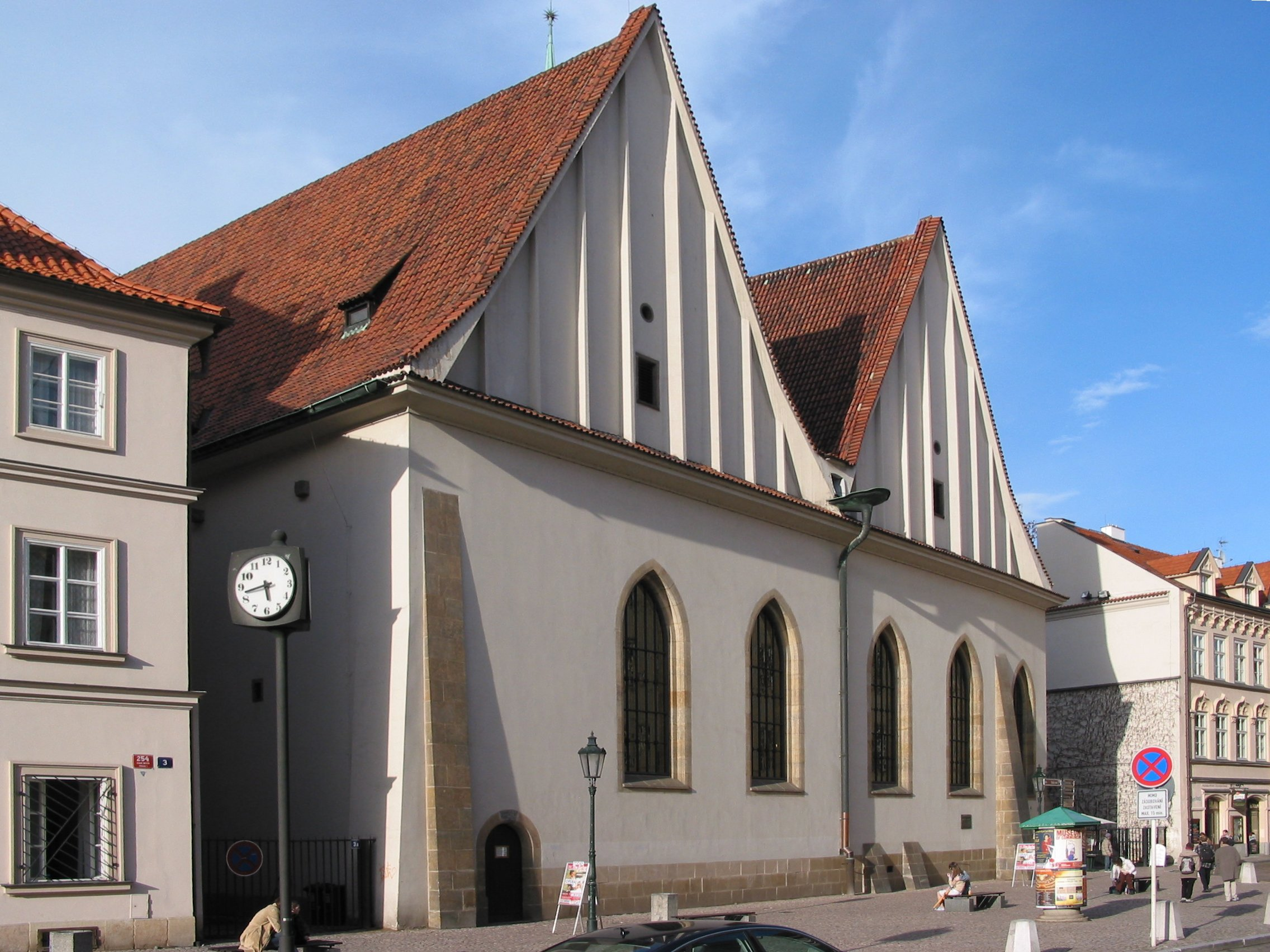
Bethlehem Chapel (exterior) in Prague

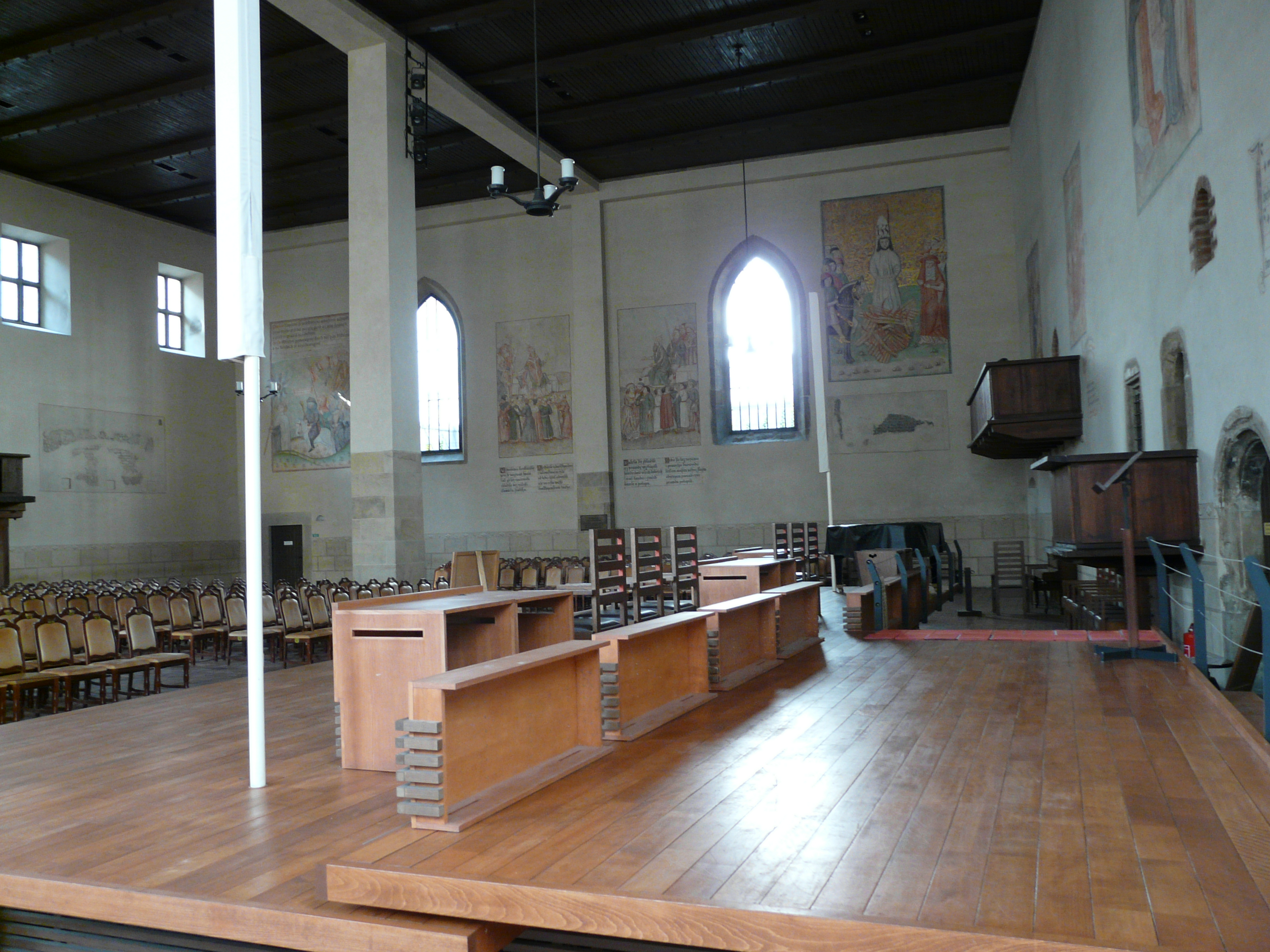
Bethlehem Chapel (interior) in Prague

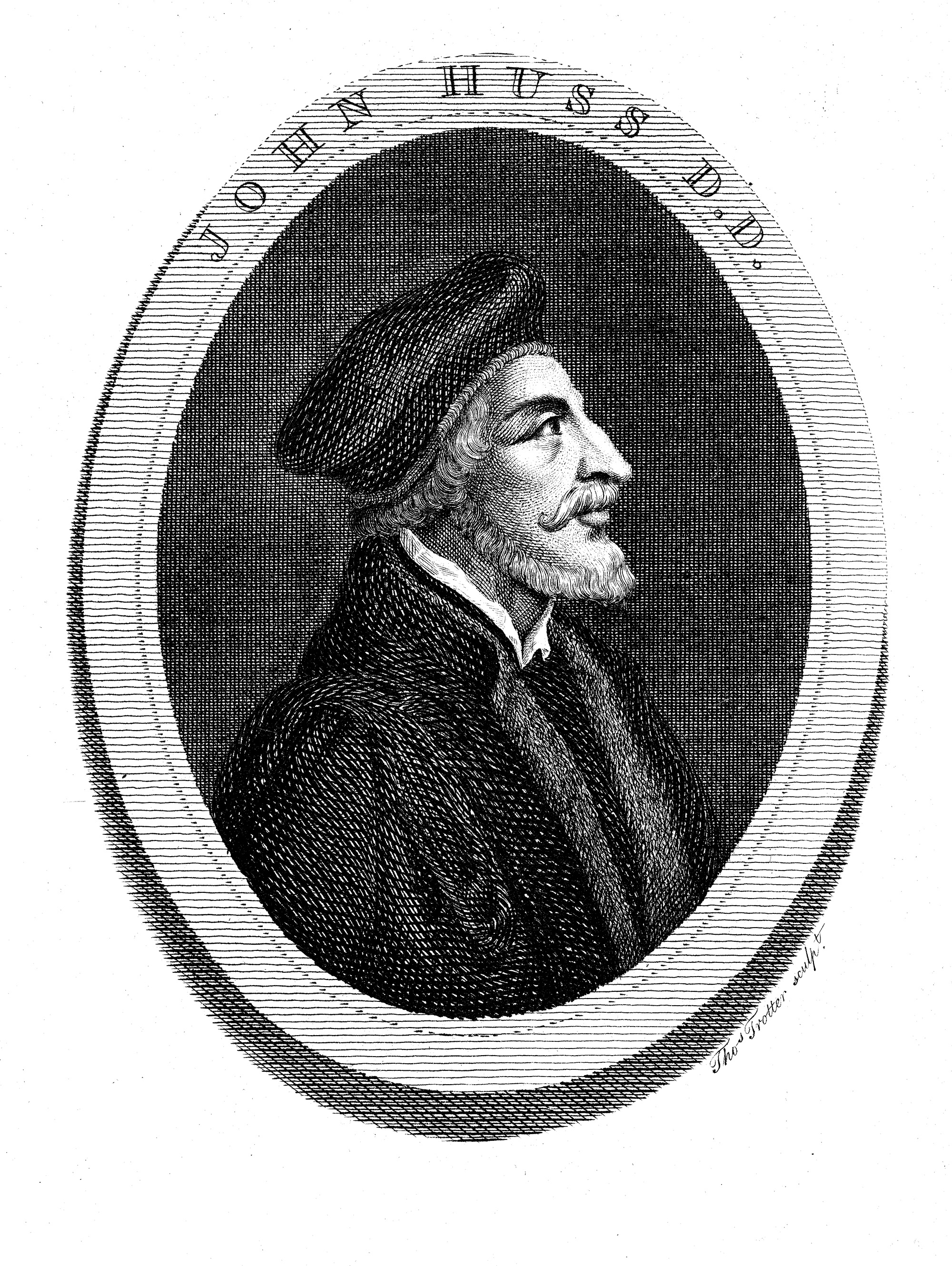
Medallion portrait of Jan Hus

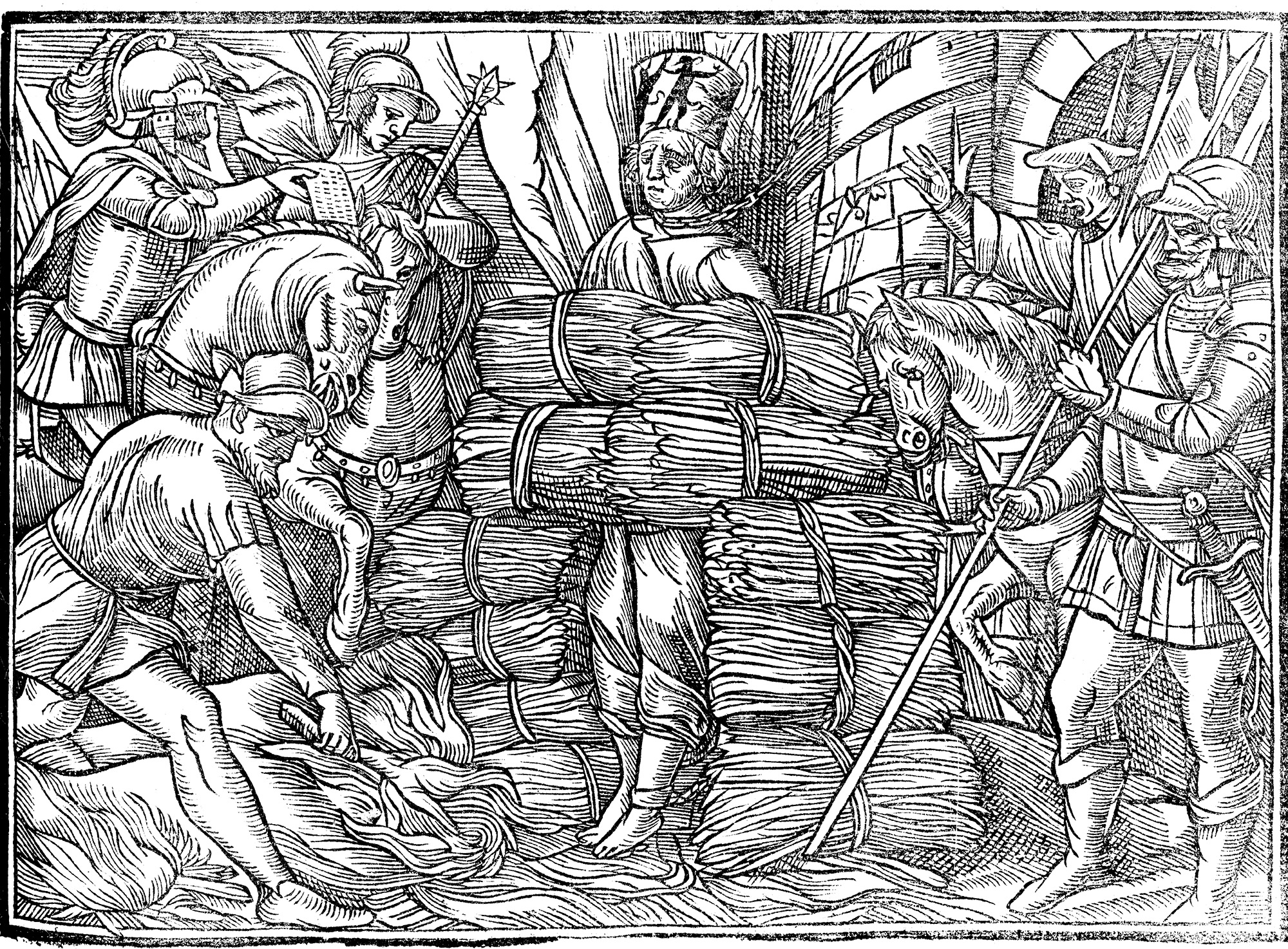
Preparing to burn Jan Hus at the stake

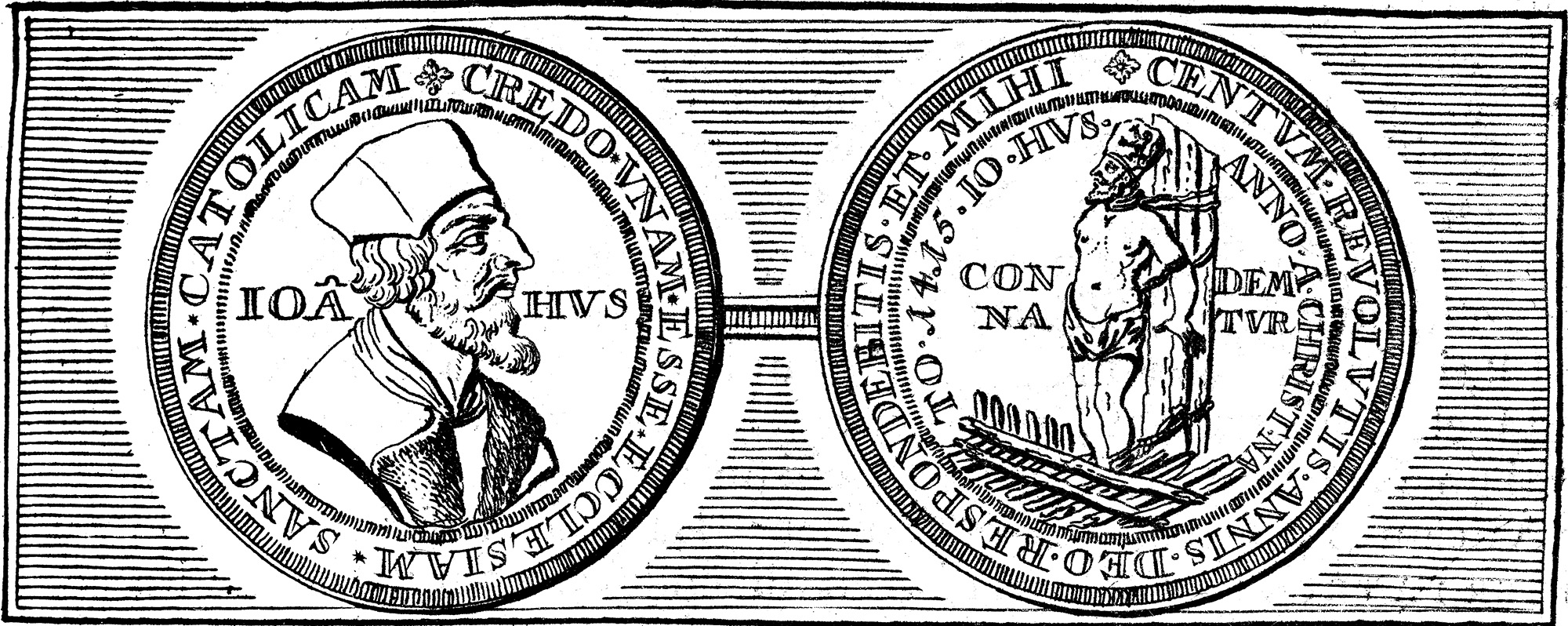
Medallion of Jan Hus, showing his portrait and execution

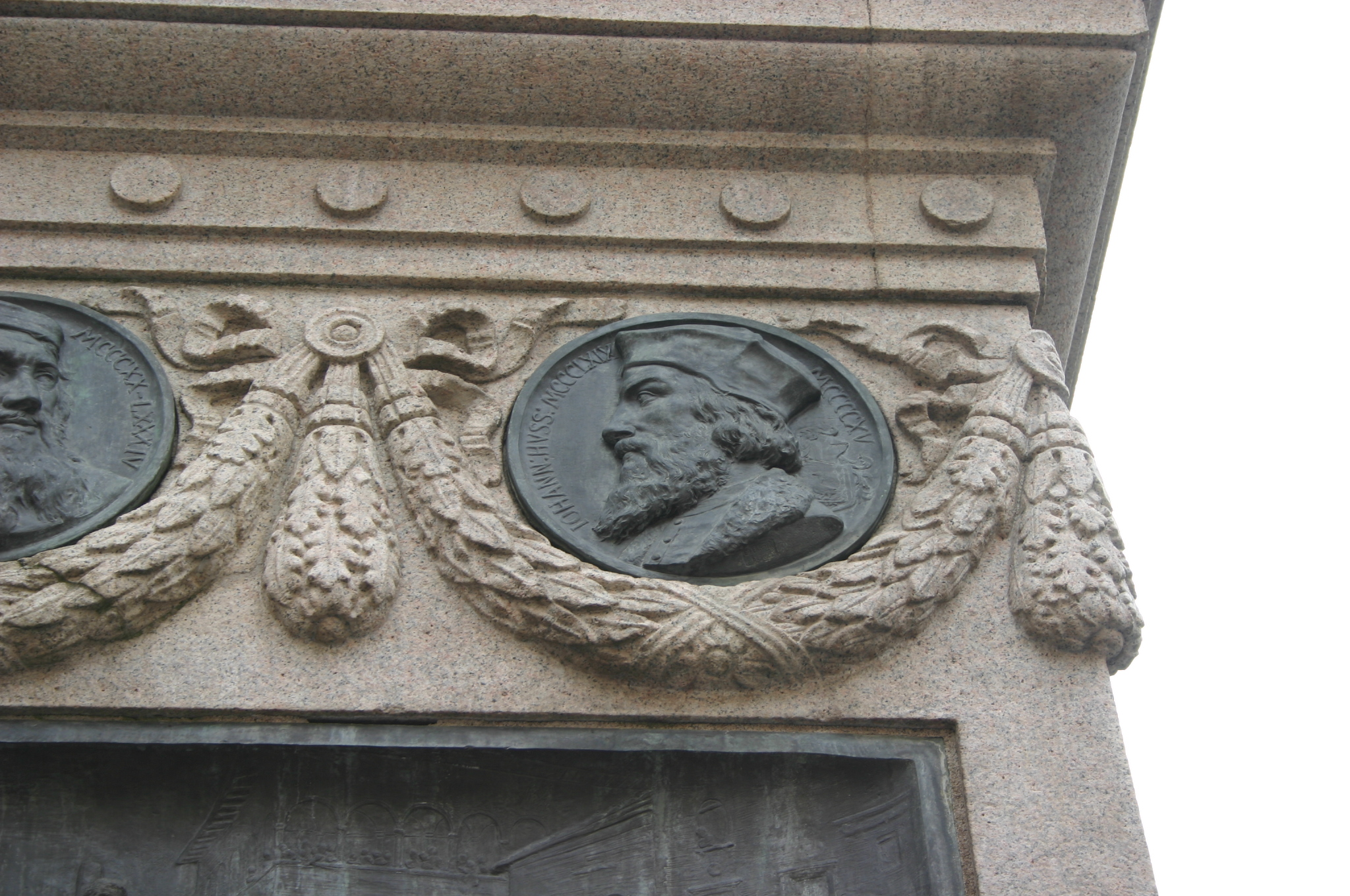
Profile of Jan Hus on the Giordano Bruno Statue

== Works ==
- Iohannes Hus. Postilla adumbrata, ed. G. Silagi (Corpus Christianorum. Continuatio Mediaevalis 261), Turnhout: Brepols Publishers (ISBN 978-2-503-55275-0)
- De Ecclesia. The Church, Jan Hus; David S. Schaff, translator, New York, Charles Scribner's Sons, 1915.Internet Archive
- Letters of John Huss Written During His Exile and Imprisonment, Jan Hus; Campbell Mackenzie, translator, Edinburgh, William Whyte & co., 1846
- The letters of John Hus, Jan Hus; Herbert B. Workman; R. Martin Pope, London, Hodder and Stoughton, 1904.
- The Letters of John Hus, Jan Hus; Matthew Spinka, translator.
- The Letters of John Hus

== See also ==
- Orthographia bohemica, a treatise thought to have been written by Jan Hus
- Jan Hus Presbyterian Church, a New York City parish of the Presbyterian Church (USA) and named after Jan Hus

== Bibliography ==
- Fudge, Thomas A. (2010). Jan Hus: Religious Reform and Social Revolution in Bohemia. Adams County Public Library: I.B. Tauris.
- Gillett, E.H. (1863). The life and times of John Huss; or, The Bohemian reformation of the fifteenth century (pt.1). Princeton Theological Seminary Library: Gould and Lincoln.
- Gilpin, William (1809). The Lives of the Reformers. Princeton Theological Seminary Library: T. Cadell and W. Davies.
- Oberman, Heiko Augustinus; Walliser-Schwarzbart (2006). Luther: Man Between God and the Devil. Yale University Press. ISBN 0-300-10313-1.
- Hus, Jan (1372–1415). The Letters of John Hus. Trinity College-University of Toronto: Hodder and Stoughton.
- Kuhns, Oscar (1907). John Huss: The Witness. Cincinnati; New York: Jennings & Graham; Eaton & Mains – via New York Public Library.
- Kuhns, Oscar; Dickie, Robert (2017). Jan Hus: Reformation in Bohemia. Morrisville, NC: Lulu. ISBN 978-1-87255629-1.
- Lützow, Francis (1909). The Life & Times of Master John Hus. Princeton Theological Seminary Library: E.P. Dutton.
- Lützow, Francis (1914). The Hussite Wars. Toronto Public Library: London:Dent, New York:Dutton.
- Lechler, Gotthard Victor (1904). John Wycliffe and His English Precursors. Religious Tract Society. p. 381.
- Macek, Josef (1958), The Hussite Movement in Bohemia, Prague: Orbis
- Nodl, Martin (2010). Horníčková, Kateřina; Šroněk, Michal (eds.). Umění české reformace (1380–1620) [The Art of the Bohemian Reformation (1380–1620)]. Praha: Academia. ISBN 978-80-200-1879-3.
- Schaff, Philip (1953). "Huss, John, Hussites". The New Schaff-Herzog Encyclopedia of Religious Knowledge.
- Shahan, Thomas Joseph (1908). "Council of Constance" . Catholic Encyclopedia. Vol. 4.
- Šmahel, František (2013). Jan Hus : život a dílo [Jan Hus: Life and Work] (in Czech). Praha: Argo. ISBN 978-80-257-0875-0.
- Václavík, David (2010). Náboženství a moderní česká společnost [Religion and Modern Czech Society] (in Czech). Grada Publishing a.s. p. 53. ISBN 9788024724683.
- Wilhelm, Joseph (1910). The Catholic Encyclopedia. Vol. 7. New York NY: Robert Appleton Company.
