= Kvaevefjellet Mountain =

Mountain in Queen Maud Land, Antarctica

Kvaevefjellet Mountain (71°52′S 14°27′E) is an elongated mountain, about 6 miles (10 km) long and surmounted by Mount Fučík, which has been eroded by the ice into a series of spurs that enclose small cirques, standing at the north end of the Payer Mountains in Queen Maud Land, Antarctica. It was discovered and plotted from air photos by the Third German Antarctic Expedition, 1938–39. It was replotted from air photos and surveys, and named, by the Sixth Norwegian Antarctic Expedition, 1956–60. Aurkvaevane Cirques, a set of three cirques, indents the bottom of the mountain.

== See also ==
- Mjøllkvaevane Cirques, indent the east side of Kvaevefjellet Mountain
