= Skavlhø Mountain =

Mountain in Queen Maud Land, Antarctica

Skavlho Mountain (72°2′S 14°30′E) is a mountain, 2,610 m, standing north of Ormeryggen in the Payer Mountains of Queen Maud Land, Antarctica. Photographed from the air by the German Antarctic Expedition (1938–39). Mapped by Norwegian cartographers from surveys and air photos by the Norwegian Antarctic Expedition (1956–60) and named Skavlho (snow-drift heights).
