= Renáta Fučíková =

Czech illustrator and author of children's books

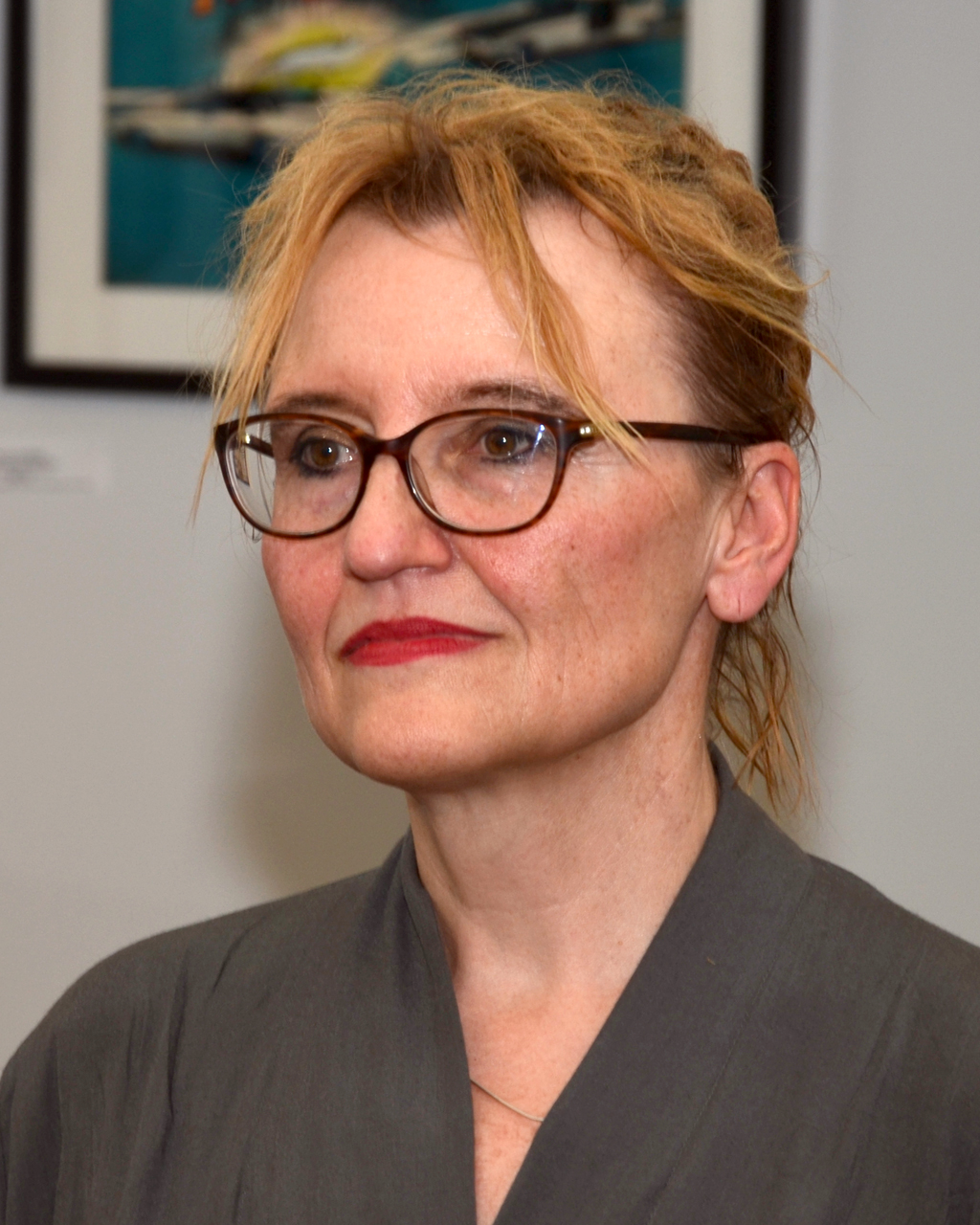
- Renáta Fučíková, 2018
- Born: 3 January 1964 (age 62); Prague, Czechoslovakia
- Known for: book illustration

Renáta Fučíková (born 3 January 1964) is a Czech book illustrator, artist and writer. She is best known for her works for children and youth about Czech and European history.

== Early life and education ==
Renáta Fučíková was born on 3 January 1964, in Prague. In 1988, she graduated from the Academy of Arts, Architecture and Design in Prague, where she focused on illustration and applied graphics.

== Career ==
Fučíková started her career in the 1990s with illustrations for classic children's books, such as works by brothers Grimm, Hans Christian Andersen or Oscar Wilde, then changed her focus to stories about Czech history, citing her son's ongoing education as a source of motivation. In 1998, one of her books was included in the IBBY Honour List. She also won the first prize at the illustration biennale in Tehran.

In the 2000s, Fučíková collaborated with the writer Alena Ježková on various publications concerning Czech history, such as books on Bohemian and Moravian legends or on Charles IV. Her biggest undertaking in the field of history was illustrating five-hundred pages long Historie Evropy ("History of Europe") written by Daniela Krolupperová and published in 2011. With the same author, Fučíková also prepared two history exercise books. The illustrator also designed a variety of stamps for the Česká pošta.

Fučíková won a number of prizes, including the Zlatá stuha (Golden Ribbon) awards for illustrations in a work on Tomáš Masaryk (2006) and in Příběhy českých knížat a králů (2007), and went on to win three more of these awards in the 2010s. In 2011, Fučíková was nominated for the Astrid Lindgren Memorial Award. Three years later, her Hus a Chelčický, a book for older children about Jan Hus and Petr Chelčický which she both wrote and illustrated, won the Association of Czech Graphic Artists HOLLAR award for illustrations. Fučíková was also nominated three times for the Magnesia Litera awards.

In 2016, Fučíková became the head of the Studio of Didactic Illustration at the Ladislav Sutnar Faculty of Design and Art of the University of West Bohemia.

Fučíková is a member of the Czech section of IBBY and of Klub ilustrátorů. She was part of the international jury of the 2021 Biennial of Illustration Bratislava.

== Works in English ==
- Dvořák – His Music and Life in Pictures, written and illustrated by Fučíková, 2013
- Prague in the Heart; 189 Stories from the City and its People, written and illustrated by Fučíková, 2015
- Franz Kafka – A Man of His Time and Our Own, written by Radek Malý and illustrated by Fučíková, 2017
