= Linnormen Hills =

Hills in Queen Maud Land, Antarctica

The Linnormen Hills (72°4′S 14°33′E) are hills extending southwest–northeast and rising close east of Skavlhø Mountain in the Payer Mountains of Queen Maud Land, Antarctica. They were photographed from the air by the Third German Antarctic Expedition (1938–39), and were mapped by Norwegian cartographers from survey and air photos by the Sixth Norwegian Antarctic Expedition (1956–60) and named Linnormen (the dragon).

== See also ==
- Vos'moy Mart Rocks
