= Payer Mountains =

Antarctic mountain range

- Payergruppe
- Location within Antarctica

Geography
- Continent: Antarctica
- Region: Queen Maud Land
- Range coordinates: 72°2′S 14°35′E
- Parent range: Hoel Mountains

The Payer Mountains (German: Payergruppe) is a group of scattered mountains extending north-south for about 37 km (23 mi), standing 15 km (9 mi) east of the Weyprecht Mountains and forming the eastern half of the Hoel Mountains in central Queen Maud Land.

They were discovered by the Third German Antarctic Expedition (1938–1939), led by Capt. Alfred Ritscher, and named for Julius Payer, Austrian polar explorer, who in company with Karl Weyprecht discovered Franz Josef Land in 1873.

== See also ==
- List of mountains of Queen Maud Land
- Veterok Rock
