= Austbanen Moraine =

Moraine in Antarctica

Coordinates: 71°32′S 12°21′E

Austbanen Moraine is a medial moraine in the glacier between the Westliche Petermann Range and the Mittlere Petermann Range in the Wohlthat Mountains, originating at Svarttindane Peaks and trending north for 12 miles (19 km). It was first roughly plotted from air photos by the Third German Antarctic Expedition between 1938 and 1939. It was mapped by the Sixth Norwegian Antarctic Expedition from 1956 to 1960, from air photos and from surveys, and named "Austbanen" ("the east path"). Vestbanen Moraine, a similar paralleling feature, lies 7 miles (11 km) westward.
