= Sandeidet Moraine =

Sandeidet Moraine (71°39′S 12°15′E) is a moraine covering the surface between Grakammen Ridge and a small rock spur just northwest, in Westliche Petermann Range, Wohlthat Mountains. First plotted from air photos by German Antarctic Expedition, 1938–39. Replotted from air photos and surveys by Norwegian Antarctic Expedition, 1956–60, and named Sandeidet (the sand isthmus).
