= Storsåtklubben Ridge =

Storsåtklubben Ridge (71°25′S 12°25′E) is a ridge, 3 nautical miles (5.6 km) long, located 5 nautical miles (9.3 km) northeast of Mount Hansen in the Mittlere Petermann Range, in the Wohlthat Mountains of Queen Maud Land. It was discovered and plotted from air photos by the German Antarctic Expedition of 1938-39 and replotted from air photos and surveys by the Norwegian Antarctic Expedition in 1956–60, and named Storsåtklubben ("the large haystack mallet").
