= Gneysovaya Peak =

Mountain in Antarctica

Gneysovaya Peak (71°33′S 12°10′E) is a peak, 2,050 metres (6,730 ft) high, on the ridge connecting Krakken Mountain and Sandseten Mountain in the Westliche Petermann Range, Wohlthat Mountains, Antarctica. It was discovered and plotted from air photos by the Third German Antarctic Expedition, 1938–39. It was mapped from air photos and surveys by the Sixth Norwegian Antarctic Expedition, 1956–60, remapped by the Soviet Antarctic Expedition, 1960–61, and named "Gora Gneysovaya" (gneiss mountain).
