= Mount Solov'yev =

Mountain in Queen Maud Land, Antarctica

Mount Solov'yev (71°41′S 12°19′E) is a peak, 2,715 m, on the south part of Grakammen Ridge in Westliche Petermann Range, Wohlthat Mountains. Discovered and plotted from air photos by German Antarctic Expedition, 1938–39. Mapped from air photos and surveys by Norwegian Antarctic Expedition, 1956–60; remapped by Soviet Antarctic Expedition, 1960–61, and named after Soviet cartographer M.D. Solov'yev.
