= Krakken Mountain =

Mountain in Queen Maud Land, Antarctica

- Location within Antarctica

Naming
- Etymology: Norwegian for "the stool"

Geography
- Continent: Antarctica
- Area: Queen Maud Land
- Range coordinates: 71°32′S 12°9′E
- Parent range: Westliche Petermann Range, Wohlthat Mountains

Krakken Mountain (71°32′S 12°9′E) is a mountain 1 nautical mile (2 km) north of Sandseten Mountain and just northwest of Gneysovaya Peak in the Westliche Petermann Range of the Wohlthat Mountains, Antarctica. It was discovered and plotted from air photos by the Third German Antarctic Expedition, 1938–39, was replotted from air photos and surveys by the Sixth Norwegian Antarctic Expedition, 1956–60, and named Krakken (the stool).
