= Kåre Bench =

Kåre Bench (71°29′S 12°10′E) is a flat-topped mountain, 1,810 metres (5,940 ft) high, standing 1 nautical mile (2 km) south of Mount Hansen and just southwest of Daykovaya Peak at the north end of the Westliche Petermann Range, in the Wohlthat Mountains of Antarctica. It was discovered and plotted from air photos by the Third German Antarctic Expedition, 1938–39. It was replotted from air photos and surveys by the Sixth Norwegian Antarctic Expedition, 1956–60, and named for Kåre Hansen, a meteorologist with the Norwegian expedition, 1958–59.
