= Sandbakken =

Sandbakken may refer to:

== Places ==
- Sandbakken, Sarpsborg, a borough in the city of Sarpsborg, Norway
- Sandbakken, Troms, a village in Lenvik municipality, Norway
- Sandbakken Chapel, a chapel in Lenvik municipality, Norway
- Sandbakken Moraine, a moraine in Queen Maud Land, Antarctica

== People ==
- Dag Henrik Sandbakken, a Norwegian politician for the Centre Party
- Herleif Sandbakken, a Norwegian Air Force Lt Colonel and aviator.
