= Petermann Ranges =

Petermann Ranges refers to:

- Petermann Ranges (Antarctica), a mountain range in Queen Maud Land
- Petermann Ranges (Australia), a heavily eroded mountain range in central Australia
