= Gråkammen Ridge =

Mountainous ridge in Antarctica

Gråkammen Ridge (71°41′S 12°20′E) is a mountainous ridge that includes Tambovskaya Peak and Mount Solov'yev, rising between the Gråhorna Peaks and Aurdalen Valley in the Westliche Petermann Range of the Wohlthat Mountains in Antarctica. It was discovered and plotted from air photos by the Third German Antarctic Expedition, 1938–39. It was replotted from air photos and surveys by the Sixth Norwegian Antarctic Expedition, 1956–60, and named Gråkammen (the gray ridge).
