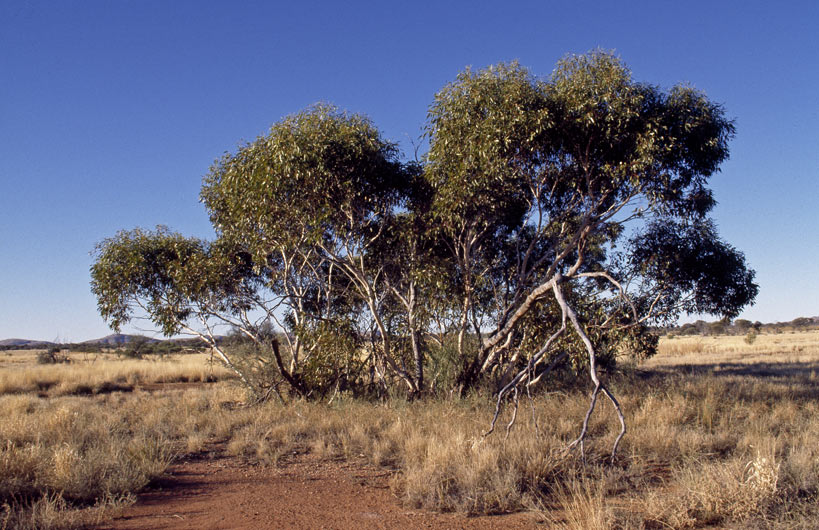
- Eucalyptus sparsa near Skirmish Hill

Conservation status
- Priority Three — Poorly Known Taxa (DEC)

Scientific classification
- Kingdom: Plantae
- Clade: Embryophytes
- Clade: Tracheophytes
- Clade: Spermatophytes
- Clade: Angiosperms
- Clade: Eudicots
- Clade: Rosids
- Order: Myrtales
- Family: Myrtaceae
- Genus: Eucalyptus
- Species: E. sparsa

Binomial name
- Eucalyptus sparsa Boomsma

= Eucalyptus sparsa =

Northern ranges box

Species of eucalyptus

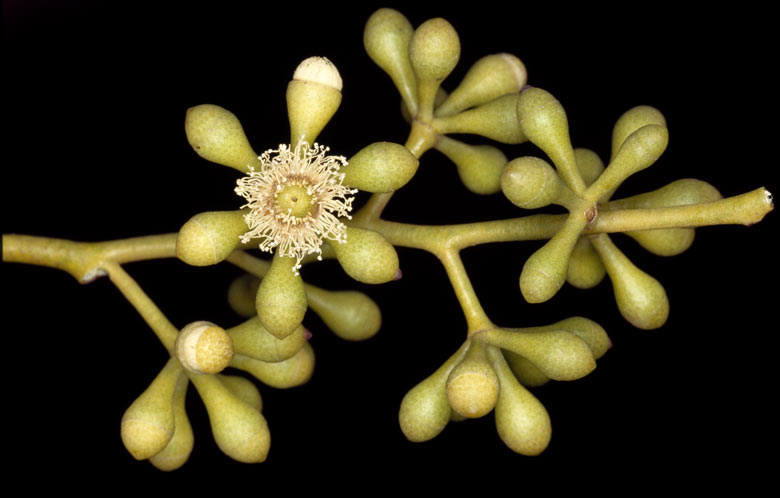
Flower buds

Eucalyptus sparsa, commonly known as the northern ranges box, is a species of mallee that is endemic to inland Australia, near the border between the Northern Territory, South Australia and Western Australia border. It has smooth pale grey and brown bark, often with rough bark on the base of larger trunks, lance-shaped adult leaves, flower buds usually in groups of seven, white flowers and shortened spherical to conical fruit.

== Description ==
Eucalyptus sparsa is a mallee that typically grows to a height of 3–10 m (9.8–32.8 ft) and forms a lignotuber. It has smooth pale grey to pale brown bark, often with rough, fibrous or flaky bark on larger trunks. Adult leaves are arranged alternately, the same shade of glossy green on both sides, lance-shaped, 70–100 mm (2.8–3.9 in) long and 13–25 mm (0.51–0.98 in) wide, tapering to a petiole 10–30 mm (0.39–1.18 in) long. The flower buds are arranged on the ends of branchlets, usually in groups of seven, on a branched peduncle 3–15 mm (0.12–0.59 in) long, the individual buds on pedicels 4–6 mm (0.16–0.24 in) long. Mature buds are oval, 4–6 mm (0.16–0.24 in) long and 3–4 mm (0.12–0.16 in) wide with a conical to hemispherical operculum. Flowering occurs from July to September or from January to February and the flowers are white. The fruit is a woody shortened spherical to conical capsule 4–7 mm (0.16–0.28 in) long and 5–7 mm (0.20–0.28 in) wide with the valves usually below rim level.

== Taxonomy and naming ==
Eucalyptus sparsa was first formally described in 1979 by Clifford David Boomsma near Betty's Creek Gorge in the Everard Ranges in 1974. The specific epithet (sparsa) refers to its sparse occurrence in South Australia.

== Distribution and habitat ==
The northern ranges box grows on sand dunes and on plains and slopes on well-drained soil. It is found near the Blackstone, Petermann, Tomkinson and Musgrave Ranges near the border between Western Australia, South Australia and the Northern Territory.

== Conservation status ==
This mallee is classified as "Priority Three" by the Government of Western Australia Department of Parks and Wildlife meaning that it is poorly known and known from only a few locations but is not under imminent threat.

== See also ==
- List of Eucalyptus species
