= Daykovaya Peak =

Mountain in Antarctica

- Location within Antarctica

Highest point
- Peak: 1995
- Coordinates: 71°28′S 12°11′E

Geography
- Location: Queen Maud Land, East Antarctica
- Parent range: Westliche Petermann Range in Wohlthat Mountains

Climbing
- Normal route: Alpine Tour (glaciated)

Daykovaya Peak is a prominent peak, 1,995 metres (6,550 ft) high, rising between Mount Hansen and Kare Bench in the Westliche Petermann Range, Wohlthat Mountains. It was discovered and plotted from air photos by the Third German Antarctic Expedition, 1938–39. It was mapped from air photos and surveys by the Sixth Norwegian Antarctic Expedition, 1956–60; remapped by the Soviet Antarctic Expedition, 1960–61, and named Gora Daykovaya (dike mountain).
