= Sandbakken Moraine =

Area of moraine

Sandbakken Moraine (71°34′S 12°8′E) is an area of moraine located 2 nautical miles (3.7 km) northwest of Grahorna Peaks, on the west side of Westliche Petermann Range, Wohlthat Mountains. It was first plotted from air photos by German Antarctic Expedition, 1938–39. It was mapped from air photos and surveys by the Norwegian Antarctic Expedition, 1956–60, and named Sandbakken (the sand slope).
