= Sandseten Mountain =

Mountain in Queen Maud Land, Antarctica

Sandseten Mountain (71°33′S 12°9′E) is a flattish mountain located 1 nautical mile (1.9 km) south of Krakken Mountain and just southwest of Gneysovaya Peak in Westliche Petermann Range of the Wohlthat Mountains. It was discovered and plotted from aerial photographs by German Antarctic Expedition, 1938–39, and later replotted from aerial photos and surveys by Norwegian Antarctic Expedition, 1956–60, which named Sandseten (the sand seat).
