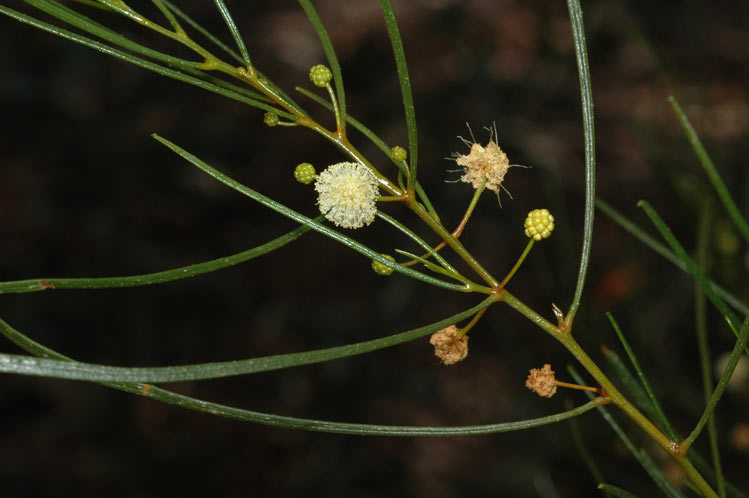
- In the ANBG

Scientific classification
- Kingdom: Plantae
- Clade: Tracheophytes
- Clade: Angiosperms
- Clade: Eudicots
- Clade: Rosids
- Order: Fabales
- Family: Fabaceae
- Subfamily: Caesalpinioideae
- Clade: Mimosoid clade
- Genus: Acacia
- Species: A. barattensis

Binomial name
- Acacia barattensis J.M.Black
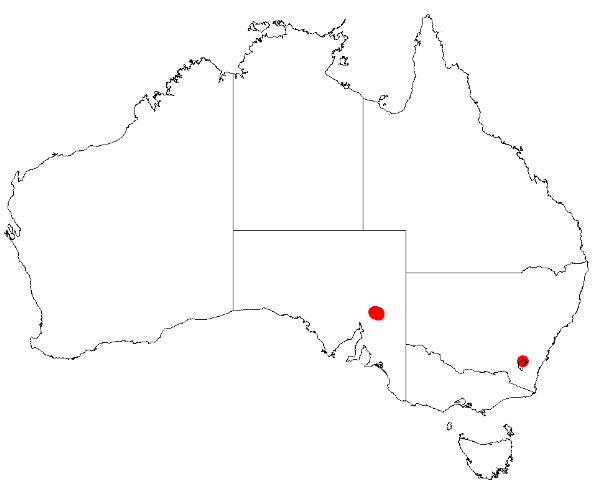
- Occurrence data from AVH

Synonyms
- Racosperma barattense (J.M.Black) Pedley

= Acacia barattensis =

Species of legume

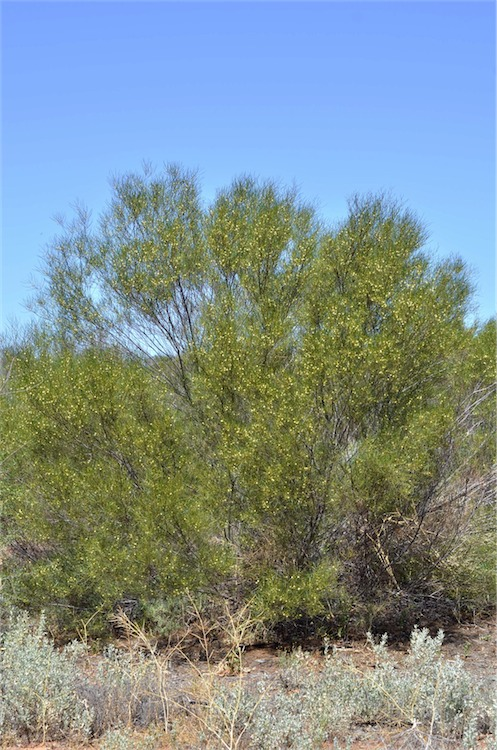
Habit in the Australian Arid Lands Botanic Garden

Acacia barattensis, commonly known as Baratta wattle, is a species of flowering plant in the family Fabaceae and is endemic to a small area of South Australia. It is a diffuse, sticky, glabrous shrub with slender, narrowly linear phyllodes, spherical heads of pale yellow flowers arranged singly or in pairs in axils, and linear pods up to 150 mm (5.9 in) long.

== Description ==
Acacia barattensis is a diffuse, sticky, glabrous shrub that typically grows to a height of 2–3 m (6 ft 7 in – 9 ft 10 in) and has slender branchlets that are often coated in a black powdery substance. Its phyllodes are erect, slender, narrowly elliptic and slightly curved, 50–100 mm (2.0–3.9 in) long, 1.0–1.5 mm (0.039–0.059 in) wide with a hooked tip and a strong resinous odour. The flowers are borne in one or two spherical head in axils on a peduncle 8–13 mm (0.31–0.51 in) long, each head with 20 to 30 pale yellow flowers. Flowering has been observed from April to December, and the pods are linear, constricted between the seeds, up to 150 mm (5.9 in) long and 25–35 mm (0.98–1.38 in) wide with oblong seeds, about 4.5 mm (0.18 in) long with a thick aril.

== Taxonomy ==
Acacia barattensis was first formally described in 1932 by the botanist John McConnell Black in the Transactions and Proceedings of the Royal Society of South Australia from specimens collected "near Baratta head-station, on a branch of the Siccus River and 20 mi (32 km) west of Koonamore". The specific epithet is taken from the name Baratta Station, the pastoral lease where the type specimen was collected.

== Distribution ==
Baratta wattle is restricted to the Flinders Range of South Australia where it grows on slopes of quartzite gullies and near creeks, often in association with Eucalyptus camaldulensis, E. flindersii and Callitris glaucophylla.

== Conservation status ==
Acacia barattensis is a rare species, and was previously thought to be extinct.

== See also ==
- List of Acacia species
