= Isdalen Valley =

Valley in Queen Maud Land, Antarctica

- Location within Antarctica

Naming
- Native name: Isdalen (Norwegian)
- English translation: The Ice Valley

Geology
- Type: Ice-filled valley

Geography
- Location: Wohlthat Mountains, Antarctica
- Country: Antarctica
- State/Province: Queen Maud Land
- Borders on: Aurdalsegga Ridge, Isdalsegga Ridge
- Coordinates: 71°44′S 12°30′E
- Interactive map of Isdalen Valley

Isdalen Valley is an ice-filled valley between Aurdalsegga Ridge and Isdalsegga Ridge in the Südliche Petermann Range of the Wohlthat Mountains in Antarctica. It was discovered and plotted from air photos by the Third German Antarctic Expedition in 1938–39. It was replotted from air photos and surveys by the Sixth Norwegian Antarctic Expedition in 1956–60 and named "Isdalen" (the ice valley).
