= Svarthornbotnen Cirque =

Cirque in Antarctica

Svarthornbotnen Cirque (71°35′S 12°36′E) is a large cirque just northeast of Store Svarthorn Peak in the Mittlere Petermann Range, Wohlthat Mountains in Antarctica. Discovered and plotted from air photos by German Antarctic Expedition, 1938–39. Replotted by Norwegian Antarctic Expedition, 1956–60, and named Svarthornbotnen (the black peak cirque).
