= Eucalyptus delicata =

Scientific classification
- Kingdom: Plantae
- Clade: Tracheophytes
- Clade: Angiosperms
- Clade: Eudicots
- Clade: Rosids
- Order: Myrtales
- Family: Myrtaceae
- Genus: Eucalyptus
- Species: E. delicata

Binomial name
- Eucalyptus delicata L.A.S.Johnson & K.D.Hill

Species of eucalyptus

Eucalyptus delicata is a species of tree that is endemic to Western Australia. It has rough, fibrous to scaly bark on the trunk, smooth white to greyish bark above, linear to narrow lance-shaped adult leaves, flower buds in groups of between seven and eleven, creamy white flowers and more or less spherical to barrel-shaped fruit.

== Description ==
Eucalyptus delicata is a tree, rarely a mallee and typically grows to a height of 5–16 m (16–52 ft) and forms a lignotuber. It has rough fibrous to scaly grey bark on the lower half and a smooth grey-copper colour above. Young plants and coppice regrowth have linear to narrow lance-shaped, more or less sessile leaves arranged spirally along the stem. Adult leaves are arranged alternately, glossy green 70–100 mm (2.8–3.9 in) long and 5–10 mm (0.20–0.39 in) wide on a petiole 8–17 mm (0.31–0.67 in) long. The flower buds are arranged in groups of seven, nine or eleven in leaf axils on an unbranched peduncle 7–15 mm (0.28–0.59 in) long, the individual buds on a pedicel 2–5 mm (0.079–0.197 in) long. Mature buds are oval, 5–8 mm (0.20–0.31 in) long and about 3 mm (0.12 in) wide with a conical to rounded operculum 2–5 mm (0.079–0.197 in) long. Flowering occurs in March or April and the flowers are creamy white. The fruit is a woody shortened spherical to barrel-shaped capsule 4–5 mm (0.16–0.20 in) long and wide on a pedicel 2–4 mm (0.079–0.157 in) long with the valves protruding. The fruit contains flattened oval, brown-grey seeds that are 1–3 mm (0.039–0.118 in) long.

== Taxonomy and naming ==
Eucalyptus delicata was first formally described in 1999 by the botanists Lawrie Johnson and Ken Hill and the description was published in the journal Telopea. The type specimen was collected by Johnson, Hill and Donald Frederick Blaxell in 1986 about 10 km (6.2 mi) west of the Coolgardie–Esperance Highway on the road to Peak Charles.

This species is part of the Eucalyptus subgenus Symphyomyrtus in the section Bisectae and the subsection Destitutae. It is closely related to E. longicornis, E. oleosa and E. longissima.

The specific epithet (delicata) is a Latin word meaning "tender", "dainty" or "fastidious", referring to the small buds and fruits.

== Distribution ==
This eucalypt is found in flat areas of the Coolgardie and Mallee biogeographic regions of Western Australia where it grows in red clay to sandy-loamy soils.

== Conservation status ==
Eucalyptus delicata is classified as "not threatened" by the Western Australian Government Department of Parks and Wildlife.

== See also ==
- List of Eucalyptus species
