= Aurdalen Valley =

Valley in Antarctica

Aurdalen Valley (71°42′S 12°22′E) is a small moraine-covered valley between Grakammen Ridge and Aurdalsegga Ridge, in the Petermann Ranges of the Wohlthat Mountains. It was discovered and plotted from air photos by the Third German Antarctic Expedition, 1938–39, re-plotted from air photos and from surveys by the Sixth Norwegian Antarctic Expedition, 1956–60, and named "Aurdalen" ("the gravel valley").
