= Liebknecht Range =

Mountain range in Antarctica

- Location within Antarctica

Geography
- Continent: Antarctica
- Region: Queen Maud Land
- Range coordinates: 71°48′S 11°22′E

The Liebknecht Range (71°48′S 11°22′E) is a mountain range, 10 nautical miles (19 km; 12 mi) long, forming the southwest arm of the Humboldt Mountains in Queen Maud Land, Antarctica.

== Exploration and naming ==
The Liebknecht Range was discovered and plotted from air photos by the German Antarctic Expedition (1938–1939) (GerAE). It was mapped from air photos and surveys by Sixth Norwegian Antarctic Expedition (NoeAE), 1956–60. It was remapped by the Soviet Antarctic Expedition (SovAE), 1960–61, and named after the German revolutionary Karl Liebknecht.

== Features ==
Features of the Liebknecht Range include:

=== Mount Deryugin ===
71°51′S 11°20′E. Mountain, 2,635 metres (8,645 ft) high, on Vindegga Spur in the Liebknecht Range. Discovered and plotted from air photos by GerAE, 1938-39. Mapped from air photos and surveys by NorAE, 1956-60. Remapped by SovAE, 1960–61, and named after Soviet zoologist K.M. Deryugin.

=== Arsen'yev Rocks ===
71°51′S 11°12′E. Rock outcrops lying among the morainal deposits 2.5 nautical miles (4.6 km; 2.9 mi) west of Mount Deryugin in the Liebknecht Range. Mapped from air photos and surveys by SovAE, 1960–61, and named after Russian geographer K.I. Arsen'yev.

=== Abolin Rock ===
71°50′S 11°16′E. Large rock outcrop lying 1 nautical mile (1.9 km; 1.2 mi) west of the north end of Vindegga Spur in the Liebknecht Range. Discovered and plotted from air photos by GerAE, 1938-39. Mapped from air photos .and surveys by NorAE, 1956–60; remapped by SovAE, 1960-61, and named after Soviet botanist R.I. Abolin.

=== Vindegga Spur ===
71°51′S 11°19′E. A prominent ridge just south of Vindegghallet Glacier in the Humboldt Mountains. Discovered and photographed by the GerAE, 1938-39. Mapped by Norway from air photos and surveys by NorAE, 1956–60, and named Vindegga (the wind ridge).

=== Vindegghallet Glacier ===
71°49′S 11°15′E. Glacier flowing west for 4 nautical miles (7.4 km; 4.6 mi) along the south side of Mount Flånuten in the Humboldt Mountains. Discovered and photographed by the GerAE, 1938-39. Mapped by Norway from air photos and surveys by NorAE, 1956–60, and named Vindegghallet (the wind ridge slope) in association with nearby Vindegga Spur.

== Sources ==
- Alberts, Fred G., ed. (1995), Geographic Names of the Antarctic (PDF) (2 ed.), United States Board on Geographic Names This article incorporates public domain material from websites or documents of the United States Board on Geographic Names.
