= Humboldt Graben =

Valley in Queen Maud Land, Antarctica

- Location within Antarctica

Geography
- Location: Antarctica
- Coordinates: 71°45′S 11°55′E
- Interactive map of Humboldt Graben

Humboldt Graben (German: Humboldtgraben, "Humboldt Trench", 71°45′S 11°55′E) is a glacier-filled valley, 20 nautical miles (37 km; 23 mi) long, trending north–south between the Humboldt Mountains and the Petermann Ranges in Queen Maud Land, Antarctica.

== Exploration and naming ==
The feature was discovered and mapped by the German Antarctic Expedition (1938–1939) under Alfred Ritscher, who named it in association with the adjacent Humboldt Mountains.

== Features ==
Features in and near the graben include:

=== Graben Horn ===
71°48′S 12°02′E. A prominent horn or cone-shaped peak 2,815 metres (9,236 ft) high rising at the east side of Humboldt Graben. The peak is situated in the central part of Pieck Range in the Petermann Ranges. Discovered by the GerAE under Ritscher, 1938-39, who named it in association with Humboldt Graben. Graben, of German origin, is a term applied to a rift valley or a fault trough.

=== Parizhskaya Kommuna Glacier ===
71°38′S 12°04′E. A glacier, 8 nautical miles (15 km; 9.2 mi) long, draining northwest between Zwiesel Mountain and Grakammen Ridge to Humboldt Graben in the Petermann Ranges. Discovered and plotted from air photos by GerAE, 1938-39. Mapped from air photos and surveys by NorAE, 1956-60. Remapped by SovAE, 1960-61, and named Lednik Parizhskoy Kommuny (Paris Commune glacier).

=== Pieck Range ===
71°45′S 12°06′E. A short mountain range surmounted by Zwiesel Mountain, located at the east side of Humboldt Graben in the Petermann Ranges. Discovered and plotted from air photos by GerAE, 1938-39. Mapped from air photos and surveys by NorAE, 1956-60; remapped by SovAE, 1960-61, and named after Wilhelm Pieck, first President of communist East Germany.

=== Zwiesel Mountain ===
71°43′S 12°08′E. A large complex mountain which is highly dissected, rising to 2,970 metres (9,740 ft) high and forming the north portion of Pieck Range in the Petermann Ranges. Discovered and given the descriptive name "Zwiesel-Berg" (forked mountain) by the GerAE, 1938-39, under Ritscher.

=== Sandbotnen Cirque ===
71°44′S 12°01′E. A cirque or small valley, the floor of which is covered by moraine, indenting the west side of Zwiesel Mountain in the Pieck Range. First plotted from air photos by GerAE, 1938-39. Replotted from air photos and surveys by NorAE, 1956-60, and named Sandbotnen (the sand cirque).

=== Bremotet Moraine ===
71°41′S 12°05′E. A small morainal area on the northwest side of Zwiesel Mountain, at the point where the glacial flow of the Humboldt Graben meets that of Parizhskaya Kommuna Glacier. First plotted from air photos by GerAE, 1938-39. Replotted from air photos and surveys by NorAE, 1956-60, and named Bremotet (the glacier meeting).

=== Skeidshornet Peak ===
71°50′S 12°01′E. A peak, 2,725 metres (8,940 ft) high, standing 5 nautical miles (9.3 km; 5.8 mi) west-southwest of Mount Valikhanov in the Pieck Range of the Petermann Ranges, in Queen Maud Land. Discovered and plotted from air photos by GerAE, 1938-39. Replotted from air photos and surveys by NorAE, 1956-60, and named Skeidshornet.

=== Mount Skeidskneet ===
71°53′S 11°57′E. A mountain, 2,600 metres (8,500 ft) high, surmounting the east side of the head of Humboldt Graben at the southwest extremity of the Petermann Ranges. Discovered and photographed by the GerAE, 1938-39. Mapped by Norway from air photos and surveys by NorAE, 1956-60, and named Skeidskneet.

=== Vestbanen Moraine ===
71°35′S 11°59′E. A medial moraine in Humboldt Graben, originating near Zwiesel Mountain and trending north in string-like fashion for 13 nautical miles (24 km; 15 mi) along the west flank of the Petermann Ranges. First plotted from air photos by GerAE, 1938-39. Remapped by NorAE, 1956-60, and named Vestbanen (the west path). The feature is similar to Austbanen Moraine which parallels it 7 nautical miles (13 km; 8.1 mi) eastward.

== Sources ==
- Alberts, Fred G., ed. (1995), Geographic Names of the Antarctic (PDF) (2 ed.), United States Board on Geographic Names This article incorporates public domain material from websites or documents of the United States Board on Geographic Names.
