= Humboldt Mountains (Antarctica) =

Mountain range in Queen Maud Land, Antarctica

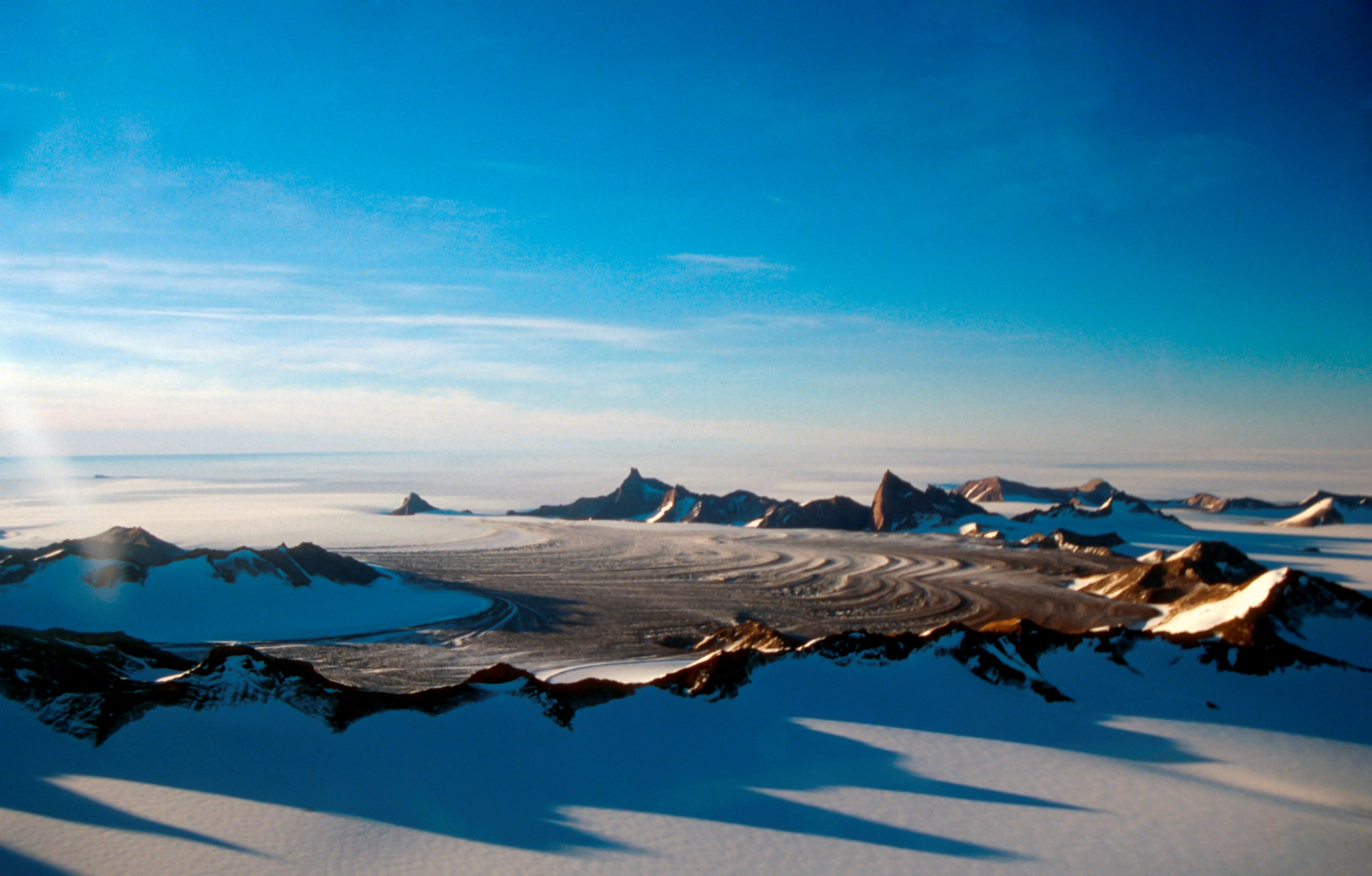
- View in northwestern direction over Schussel Cirque

Geography
- Location within Antarctica
- Continent: Antarctica
- Region: Queen Maud Land
- Range coordinates: 71°45′S 11°30′E

The Humboldt Mountains (71°45′S 11°30′E) are a group of mountains immediately west of the Petermann Ranges, forming the westernmost portion of the Wohlthat Mountains in Queen Maud Land, Antarctica.

== Discovery and naming ==
The mountains were discovered and mapped by the Third German Antarctic Expedition (1938–1939), led by Alfred Ritscher, who named them for Alexander von Humboldt, famed German naturalist and geographer of the first half of the nineteenth century.

== Historic monument ==
A plaque was erected at India Point (71°45′08″S 11°12′30″E) in the Humboldt Mountains in memory of three scientists of the Geological Survey of India, as well as a communications technician from the Indian Navy, all of whom were members of the ninth Indian Expedition to Antarctica, who died in an accident at the site on 8 January 1990. The plaque has been designated a Historic Site or Monument (HSM 78), following a proposal by India to the Antarctic Treaty Consultative Meeting.

== Major features ==
Major features of the Humboldt Mountains, from north to south, include:

- Humboldt Graben, a glacier-filled valley, 20 nautical miles (37 km; 23 mi) long, trending north–south between the Humboldt Mountains and the Petermann Ranges.
- Nordwestliche Insel Mountains, a small, detached group of mountains, island-like in appearance, and forming the northern extremity of the Humboldt Mountains.
- Schüssel Cirque, a large west-facing cirque containing Schüssel Moraine, in the north-central part of the Humboldt Mountains.
- Grautskåla Cirque, a cirque immediately north of The Altar.
- Eidshaugane Peaks, a group of peaks 1 nautical mile (1.9 km; 1.2 mi) north of Eidsgavlen Cliff.
- Livdebotnen Cirque, a cirque formed in the northeast side of Mount Flånuten and the west side of Botnfjellet Mountain.
- Liebknecht Range, a mountain range, 10 nautical miles (19 km; 12 mi) long, forming the southwest arm of the Humboldt Mountains.
- Betekhtin Range, a mountain range about 14 nautical miles (26 km; 16 mi) long, forming the southern arm of the Humboldt Mountains.

== Sources ==
- Alberts, Fred G., ed. (1995), Geographic Names of the Antarctic (PDF) (2 ed.), United States Board on Geographic Names This article incorporates public domain material from websites or documents of the United States Board on Geographic Names.
