= Eidshaugane Peaks =

Group of peaks in Queen Maud Land, Antarctica

- Location within Antarctica

Geography
- Continent: Antarctica
- Region: Queen Maud Land
- Range coordinates: 71°40′S 11°46′E

The Eidshaugane Peaks (71°40′S 11°46′E) are a group of peaks 1 nautical mile (1.9 km; 1.2 mi) north of Eidsgavlen Cliff in the Humboldt Mountains of Queen Maud Land, Antarctica.

== Exploration and naming ==
The Eidshaugane Peaks were discovered and photographed by the German Antarctic Expedition (1938–1939) GerAE). They were mapped from air photos and surveys by the Sixth Norwegian Antarctic Expedition, 1956–1960 (NorAE), and named Eidshaugane (the isthmus hills).

== Features ==
Features in or near the Eidshaugane Peaks include:

=== Luna-Devyat' Mountain ===
71°40′S 11°50′E. Mountain, 1,880 metres (6,170 ft) high, forming the east end of the Eidshaugane Peaks. Discovered and plotted from air photos by GerAE, 1938–39. Mapped from air photos and surveys by NorAE, 1956–1960; Remapped by the Soviet Antarctic Expedition (SovAE), 1960–61, and named Gora Luna-Devyat' (Luna Nine Mountain) in commemoration of the achievements of Soviet scientists in the study of space.

=== Eidsgavlen Cliff ===
71°41′S 11°42′E. A cliff 1 nautical mile (1.9 km; 1.2 mi) south of Eidshaugane Peaks. Discovered and photographed by the GerAE, 1938–39. Mapped from air photos and surveys by NorAE, 1956–1960, and named Eidsgavlen (the isthmus gable).

=== Mount Dobrynin ===
71°42′S 11°46′E. A mountain, 1,970 metres (6,460 ft) high, standing 1 mile (1.6 km) east-southeast of Eidsgavlen Cliff. Discovered and plotted from air photos by GerAE, 1938–39. Mapped from air photos and surveys by NorAE, 1956–1960. Remapped by SovAE, 1960–61, and named after Soviet geographer B.F. Dobrynin.

=== Storkvammen Cirque ===
71°44′S 11°44′E. A cirque between Eidsgavlen and Kvamsgavlen Cliffs. Discovered and photographed by the GerAE, 1938–39. Mapped and named Storkvammen by Norway from air photos and surveys by the NorAE, 1956–1960.

=== Kvamsgavlen Cliff ===
71°46′S 11°50′E. A gable-like cliff facing east at the southeast corner of Storkvammen Cirque. Discovered and photographed by the GerAE, 1938–39. Mapped and named Kvamsgavlen by Norway from air photos and surveys by the NorAE, 1956–1960.

=== Storeidet Col ===
71°41′S 11°31′E. A prominent col situated 3.5 nautical miles (6.5 km; 4.0 mi) west of Eidshaugane Peaks in the central Humboldt Mountains. Discovered and photographed by the GerAE, 1938–39. Mapped by Norway from air photos and surveys by NorAE, 1956–1960, and named Storeidet (the great isthmus).

== Sources ==
- Alberts, Fred G., ed. (1995), Geographic Names of the Antarctic (PDF) (2 ed.), United States Board on Geographic Names This article incorporates public domain material from websites or documents of the United States Board on Geographic Names.
