= Grautskåla Cirque =

Cirque in Antarctica

- Location within Antarctica

Geography
- Continent: Antarctica
- Region: Queen Maud Land
- Range coordinates: 71°37′S 11°22′E

Grautskåla Cirque (71°37′S 11°22′E) is a cirque immediately north of The Altar in the Humboldt Mountains of Queen Maud Land, Antarctica.

== Exploration and naming ==
Grautskåla Cirque was discovered and mapped from air photos by the German Antarctic Expedition (1938–1939) (GerAE). It was remapped by the Sixth Norwegian Antarctic Expedition, 1956–60 (NorAE), and named Grautskåla (the mash bowl) because of its appearance and association with nearby Schüssel Cirque.

== Features ==
Features in and around the Grautskåla Cirque include Loze Mountain to the west, Sponskaftet Spur, Mount Kurchatov, The Altar and Altarduken Glacier to the south, and Mechnikov Peak to the east.

=== Loze Mountain ===
71°37′S 11°17′E. A mountain, 2,130 metres (6,990 ft) high, surmounting the west wall of Grautskala Cirque. Discovered and plotted from air photos by the GerAE, 1938-39. Mapped from air photos and surveys by NorAE, 1956-60. Remapped by SovAE, 1960-61, and named after "Lose Platte," a name applied by GerAE to an indeterminate feature in the area.

=== Sponskaftet Spur ===
71°39′S 11°12′E. A spur extending west from The Altar. Discovered and mapped from air photos by the GerAE, 1938-39. Remapped by Norway from air photos and surveys by NorAE, 1956-60, and named Sponskaftet (the wooden spoon handle).

=== Mount Kurchatov ===
71°39′S 11°14′E. A peak, 2,220 metres (7,280 ft) high, rising from the base of Sponskaftet Spur. Discovered and plotted from air photos by GerAE, 1938-39. Mapped from air photos and surveys by NorAE, 1956-60. Remapped by SovAE, 1960-61, and named after Soviet academician I.V. Kurchatov.

=== The Altar ===
71°39′S 11°22′E. A flat-topped rock summit 2,200 metres (7,200 ft) high at the head of Grautskåla Cirque, immediately west of Altarduken Glacier. Discovered and given the descriptive name Altar by the GerAE under Ritscher, 1938-39.

=== Altarduken Glacier ===
71°39′S 11°26′E. A small glacier just east of The Altar at the head of Grautskala Cirque, in the Humboldt Mountains of Queen Maud Land. Discovered and mapped from air photos by the GerAE, 1938-39. Remapped by Norway from air photos and surveys by the NorAE, 1956-60, and named Altarduken (the altar cloth) in association with The Altar.

== Sources ==
- Alberts, Fred G., ed. (1995), Geographic Names of the Antarctic (PDF) (2 ed.), United States Board on Geographic Names This article incorporates public domain material from websites or documents of the United States Board on Geographic Names.
