= Eucalyptus wyolensis =

Wyola mallee

Conservation status
- Near Threatened (IUCN 3.1)

Scientific classification
- Kingdom: Plantae
- Clade: Tracheophytes
- Clade: Angiosperms
- Clade: Eudicots
- Clade: Rosids
- Order: Myrtales
- Family: Myrtaceae
- Genus: Eucalyptus
- Species: E. wyolensis

Binomial name
- Eucalyptus wyolensis Boomsma

Species of eucalyptus

Eucalyptus wyolensis, commonly known as the Wyola mallee, is a species of mallee that is endemic to South Australia. It has rough bark on the base of the stems, smooth grey to brown bark above, heart-shaped to egg-shaped adult leaves arranged in opposite pairs, flower buds in groups of seven to eleven, pale yellow flowers and cup-shaped to barrel-shaped fruit.

== Description ==
Eucalyptus wyolensis is a mallee that typically grows to a height of 7 m (23 ft) and forms a lignotuber. The bark is rough and fibrous on the base of the trunk, sometimes to the larger branches, and smooth grey to brown or cream-coloured above. Young plants and coppice regrowth have stems that are square in cross-section, glaucous and heart-shaped, 50–100 mm (2.0–3.9 in) long and 40–70 mm (1.6–2.8 in) wide. Adult leaves are similar to the juvenile leaves, heart-shaped to egg-shaped, the same glaucous green on both sides, sessile, 50–100 mm (2.0–3.9 in) long and 30–60 mm (1.2–2.4 in) wide. The flowers buds are arranged in leaf axils in groups of seven, nine or eleven on an unbranched peduncle 8–15 mm (0.31–0.59 in) long, the individual buds on pedicels 4–6 mm (0.16–0.24 in) long. Mature buds are oval, glaucous, 12–17 mm (0.47–0.67 in) long and 6–8 mm (0.24–0.31 in) wide with a beaked operculum that is longer than the floral cup. Flowering has been observed in July and the flowers are pale yellow. The fruit is a woody cup-shaped to barrel-shaped capsule 8–11 mm (0.31–0.43 in) long and 8–10 mm (0.31–0.39 in) wide with the valves protruding above the rim.

== Taxonomy and naming ==
Eucalyptus wyolensis was first formally described in 1988 by Clifford David Boomsma in the Journal of the Adelaide Botanic Garden from specimens collected west of Carle Thulka and south of Lake Wyola in 1987. The specific epithet and the common name is a reference to its occurrence near Lake Wyola in the Great Victoria Desert.

== Distribution and habitat ==
This mallee is only known from two populations between Lake Maurice and the border with Western Australia where it grows on red sandplain in the southern part of the Great Victoria Desert.

== Conservation status ==
In 2019 the International Union for the Conservation of Nature listed E. wyolensis as a near threatened species with a stable but severely fragmented population with an estimated area of occupancy of 36 km^{2} (14 sq mi) and an estimated extent of occurrence of 1,055 km^{2} (407 sq mi).

== See also ==
- List of Eucalyptus species
