= Gråhorna Peaks =

Mountains in Antarctica

The Gråhorna Peaks (71°36′S 12°16′E) are a cluster of peaks 5 nautical miles (9 km) west of Store Svarthorn Peak in the Westliche Petermann Range, in the Wohlthat Mountains of Queen Maud Land, Antarctica. They were discovered by the Third German Antarctic Expedition under Alfred Ritscher, 1938–39, who gave the name "Graue Horner" (gray peaks). The feature was remapped by the Sixth Norwegian Antarctic Expedition, 1956–60, who used the form Gråhorna. The Norwegian spelling has been recommended by the Advisory Committee on Antarctic Names to agree with associated features having the same root spelling.
