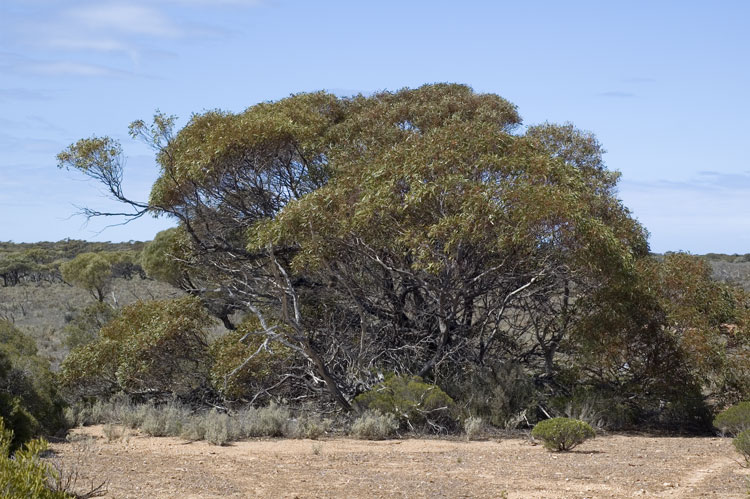
- Eucalyptus yalatensis on the Nullarbor Plain in South Australia

Scientific classification
- Kingdom: Plantae
- Clade: Embryophytes
- Clade: Tracheophytes
- Clade: Spermatophytes
- Clade: Angiosperms
- Clade: Eudicots
- Clade: Rosids
- Order: Myrtales
- Family: Myrtaceae
- Genus: Eucalyptus
- Species: E. yalatensis

Binomial name
- Eucalyptus yalatensis Boomsma

= Eucalyptus yalatensis =

Yalata mallee

Species of eucalyptus

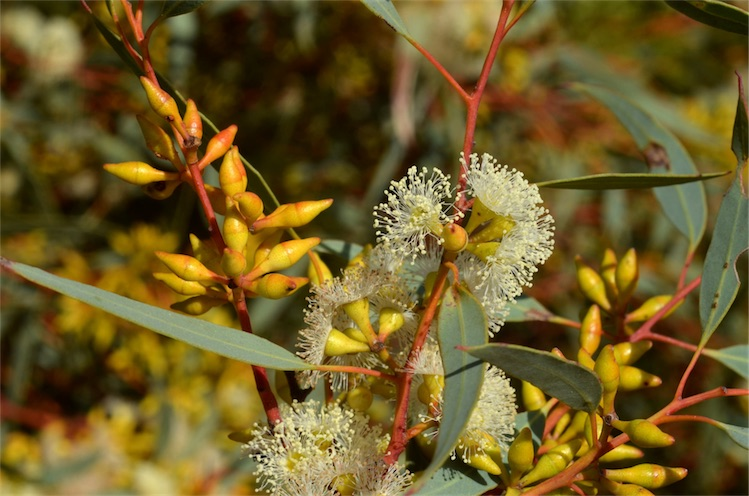
Flower buds and flowers

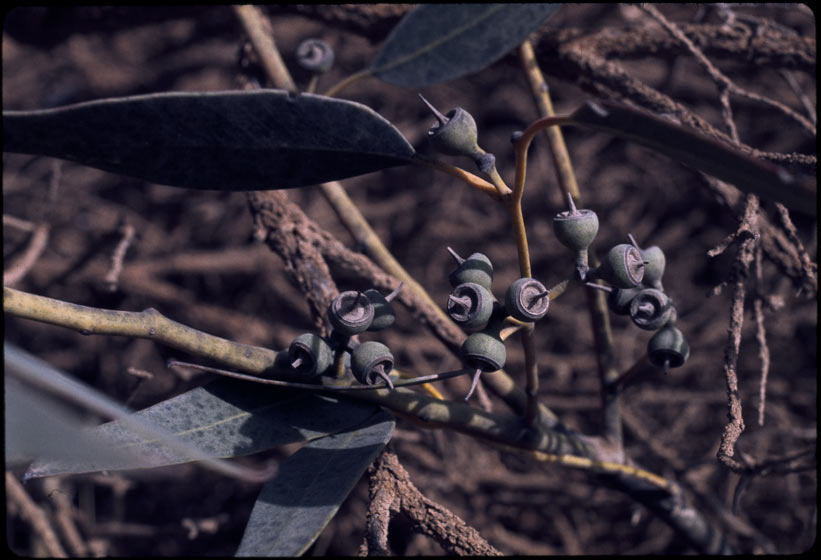
Fruit

Eucalyptus yalatensis, commonly known as the Yalata mallee, is a species of mallee or a shrub that is endemic to southern Australia. It has rough, fibrous or flaky bark on the stems, smooth bark above, lance-shaped adult leaves, flower buds mostly in groups of nine, creamy white or yellowish flowers and hemispherical to shortened spherical fruit.

== Description ==
Eucalyptus yalatensis is a mallee that typically grows to a height of 4 metres (13 ft), or a low, sprawling shrub with a diameter up to 7 metres (23 ft), and forms a lignotuber. It has rough, fibrous to flaky brownish grey bark on part or all of the stems, smooth pale grey to brownish bark above. Young plants and coppice regrowth have dull greyish green, sessile, egg-shaped leaves that are 43–80 mm (1.7–3.1 in) long and 14–40 mm (0.55–1.57 in) wide. Adult leaves are arranged alternately, the same shade of greyish or glaucous on both sides, lance-shaped, 60–120 mm (2.4–4.7 in) long and 9–22 mm (0.35–0.87 in) wide, tapering to a petiole 10–20 mm (0.39–0.79 in) long. The flower buds are arranged in leaf axils in groups of nine or eleven on an unbranched peduncle 3–10 mm (0.12–0.39 in) long, the individual buds on pedicels 2–5 mm (0.079–0.197 in) long. Mature buds are spindle-shaped to egg-shaped, 7–12 mm (0.28–0.47 in) long and 3–6 mm (0.12–0.24 in) wide with a narrow conical operculum that is longer than the floral cup. It blooms between October and February producing creamy white or pale yellowish flowers. The fruit is a woody, hemispherical to shortened spherical capsule 4–7 mm (0.16–0.28 in) long and wide with the valves protruding. The seeds are oval, glossy grey-brown and 1–2 mm (0.039–0.079 in) long.

== Taxonomy and naming ==
Eucalyptus yalatensis was first formally described in 1975 by Clifford Boomsma in the South Australian Naturalist from specimens collected by Bruce Jabez Copley (1933–1984) near Yalata in 1969. The specific epithet and common name refer to the area where the type specimens were collected.

== Distribution ==
Yalata mallee grows in mallee on level to slightly undulating country, sometimes on limestone cliffs but always on calcareous or sandy soil over limestone. It is found from Balladonia and Israelite Bay in the west to the Eyre Peninsula in South Australia, and disjunctly near Mannum.

== Conservation status ==
This eucalypt is classified as "not threatened" by the Western Australian Government Department of Parks and Wildlife.

== See also ==
- List of Eucalyptus species
