= Livdebotnen Cirque =

Cirque in Antarctica

- Location within Antarctica

Geography
- Continent: Antarctica
- Region: Queen Maud Land
- Range coordinates: 71°45′S 11°21′E

Livdebotnen Cirque (71°45′S 11°21′E) is a cirque formed in the northeast side of Mount Flånuten and the west side of Botnfjellet Mountain, in the Humboldt Mountains of Queen Maud Land, Antarctica.

== Exploration and naming ==
Livdebotnen Cirque was discovered and photographed by the German Antarctic Expedition (1938–1939) (GerAE). It was mapped by Norway from air photos and surveys by the Sixth Norwegian Antarctic Expedition, 1956–60 (NorAE), and named Livdebotnen (the shelter cirque).

== Features ==
Features in and around the Livdebotnen Cirque include:

=== Botnfjellet Mountain ===
71°45′S 11°25′E. A mountain, 2,750 metres (9,020 ft) high, forming the northeast and east walls of Livdebotnen Cirque. Discovered and photographed by the GerAE, 1938-39. Mapped by Norway from air photos and surveys by NorAE, 1956-60, and named Botnfjellet (the cirque mountain).

=== Skarskvervet Glacier ===
71°45′S 11°30′E. Small cirque-type glacier at the east side of Botnfjellet Mountain. Discovered and photographed by the GerAE, 1938-39. Mapped by Norway from air photos and surveys by NorAE, 1956-60, and named Skarskvervet.

=== Skeidskar Gap ===
71°46′S 11°33′E. A narrow gap in the ridge along the southeast side of Skarskvervet Glacier. Discovered and photographed by the GerAE, 1938-39. Mapped by Norway from air photos and surveys by NorAE, 1956-60, and named Skeidskar.

=== Mount Flånuten ===
71°47′S 11°17′E. A mountain, 2,725 metres (8,940 ft) high, extending as a massif between Livdebotnen Cirque and Vindegghallet Glacier. Discovered and photographed by the GerAE, 1938-39. Mapped by Norway from air photos and surveys of the NorAE, 1956-60, and named Flanuten (the flat summit).

=== Kal'vets Rock ===
71°47′S 11°09′E. A rock outcrop lying 2 nautical miles (3.7 km; 2.3 mi) west-southwest of the summit of Mount Flånuten. Discovered and plotted from air photos by GerAE, 1938-39. Mapped from air photos and surveys by NorAE, 1956-60. Remapped by SovAE, 1960-61, and named after Soviet pilot O.A. Kal'vets.

=== Kruber Rock ===
71°45′S 11°05′E. A lone rock lying 3.5 miles (5.6 km) west-northwest of the summit of Flånuten. Discovered and plotted from air photos by GerAE, 1938-39. Mapped from air photos and surveys by NorAE, 1956-60; remapped by SovAE, 1960-61, and named after Soviet geographer A.A. Kruber.

== Sources ==
- Alberts, Fred G., ed. (1995), Geographic Names of the Antarctic (PDF) (2 ed.), United States Board on Geographic Names This article incorporates public domain material from websites or documents of the United States Board on Geographic Names.
