= Svarttindane Peaks =

Svarttindane Peaks (71°39′S 12°30′E) is a cluster of sharp peaks including Veselaya Mountain, located 2 nautical miles (3.7 km) south of Store Svarthorn Peak in Sudliche Petermann Range, Wohlthat Mountains. Discovered and plotted from air photos by German Antarctic Expedition, 1938–39. Replotted from air photos and surveys by Norwegian Antarctic Expedition, 1956–60, and named Svarttindane (the black peaks).
