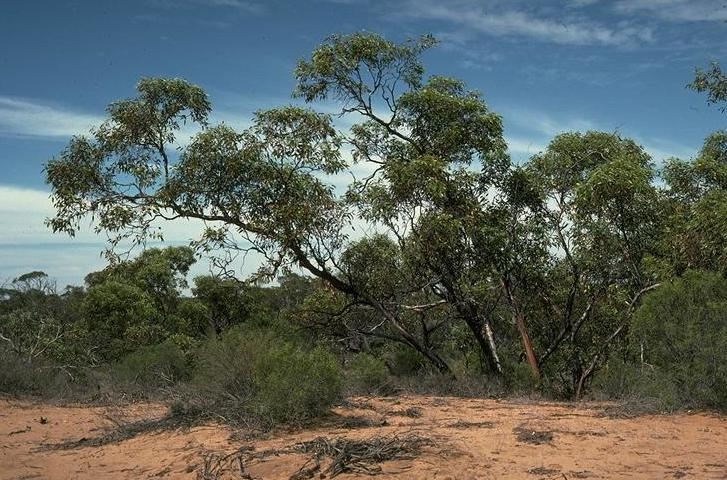
- Eucalyptus yumbarrana in Yumbarra Conservation Park

Scientific classification
- Kingdom: Plantae
- Clade: Embryophytes
- Clade: Tracheophytes
- Clade: Spermatophytes
- Clade: Angiosperms
- Clade: Eudicots
- Clade: Rosids
- Order: Myrtales
- Family: Myrtaceae
- Genus: Eucalyptus
- Species: E. yumbarrana

Binomial name
- Eucalyptus yumbarrana Boomsma

= Eucalyptus yumbarrana =

Yumbarra mallee

Species of eucalyptus

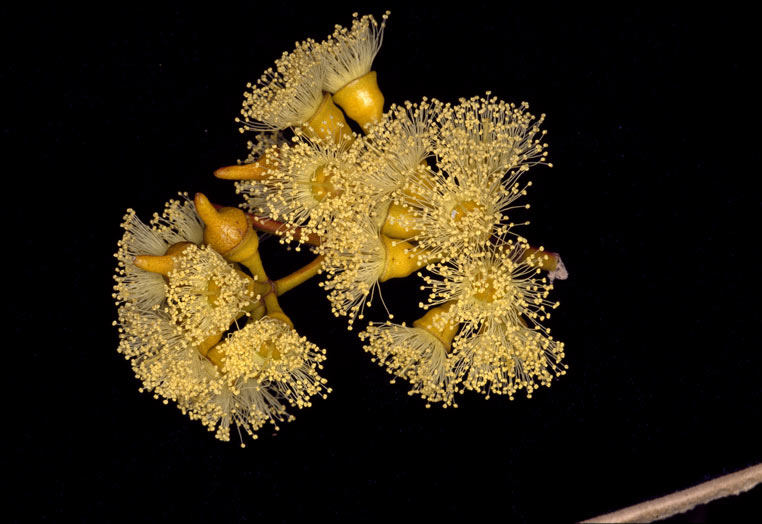
Flower buds and flowers

Eucalyptus yumbarrana, commonly known as the Yumbarra mallee is a species of mallee that is endemic to South Australia. It has rough, flaky bark on the lower trunk, smooth bark above, egg-shaped to lance-shaped adult leaves, flower buds in groups of seven, creamy white to yellow flowers and shortened spherical to cup-shaped fruit.

== Description ==
Eucalyptus yumbarrana is an erect to sprawling mallee that typically grows to a height of 6 m (20 ft), rarely a tree to 8 m (26 ft), and forms a lignotuber. It has fibrous-stringy bark on the trunk and lower stems, smooth grey to cream-coloured bark above and that is shed in ribbons that often hang in the upper branches. Young plants and coppice regrowth have stems that are square in cross-section, and leaves that are dull bluish green, elliptical to egg-shaped, or round, 38–120 mm (1.5–4.7 in) long and 25–55 mm (0.98–2.17 in) wide. Adult leaves are the same glossy green on both sides, egg-shaped to lance-shaped or broadly lance-shaped, 70–130 mm (2.8–5.1 in) long and 20–50 mm (0.79–1.97 in) wide on a petiole 15–30 mm (0.59–1.18 in) long. The flower buds are arranged in leaf axils on an unbranched peduncle 7–20 mm (0.28–0.79 in) long, the individual buds on pedicels 4–7 mm (0.16–0.28 in) long. Mature buds are oval, 12–20 mm (0.47–0.79 in) long and 7–9 mm (0.28–0.35 in) wide with a beaked operculum 8–13 mm (0.31–0.51 in) long. Flowering occurs from July to October and the flowers are creamy white to yellow. The fruit is a woody shortened spherical to cup-shaped capsule 8–12 mm (0.31–0.47 in) long and 8–10 mm (0.31–0.39 in) wide with the valves protruding.

== Taxonomy and naming ==
Eucalyptus yumbarrana was first formally described in 1979 by Clifford David Boomsma in the Journal of the Adelaide Botanic Gardens from specimens collected in Yumbarra Conservation Park in 1977. The specific epithet (yumbarrana) is a reference to the type location.

== Distribution and habitat ==
Eucalyptus yumbarrana is often found in the swales between sand dunes in open shrubland in arid areas in the Yumbarra and Koonibba areas.

== See also ==
- List of Eucalyptus species
