= Sørhortane =

Group of rock crags in Queen Maud Land

Sørhortane (72°2′S 12°35′E) is a group of rock crags along the northeast edge of Horteriset Dome, southward of the Petermann Ranges in Queen Maud Land. They were photographed from the air by the German Antarctic Expedition of 1938–39. They were mapped by Norwegian cartographers from surveys and air photos by the Norwegian Antarctic Expedition (1956–60) and named Sørhortane.
