= Vesëlaya Mountain =

Mountain in Antarctica

Coordinates: 71°38′S 12°32′E

Veselaya Mountain is a mountain with a sharp summit (2,385 m) forming the north end of the Svarttindane Peaks in Sudliche Petermann Range, Wohlthat Mountains. It was discovered and plotted from air photos by the German Antarctic Expedition, 1938–39, and was mapped from air photos and surveys by the Norwegian Antarctic Expedition, 1956–60. It was later remapped by the Soviet Antarctic Expedition, 1960–61, and named Gora Veselaya, meaning "cheerful mountain."
