= Schüssel Cirque =

Cirque in Antarctica

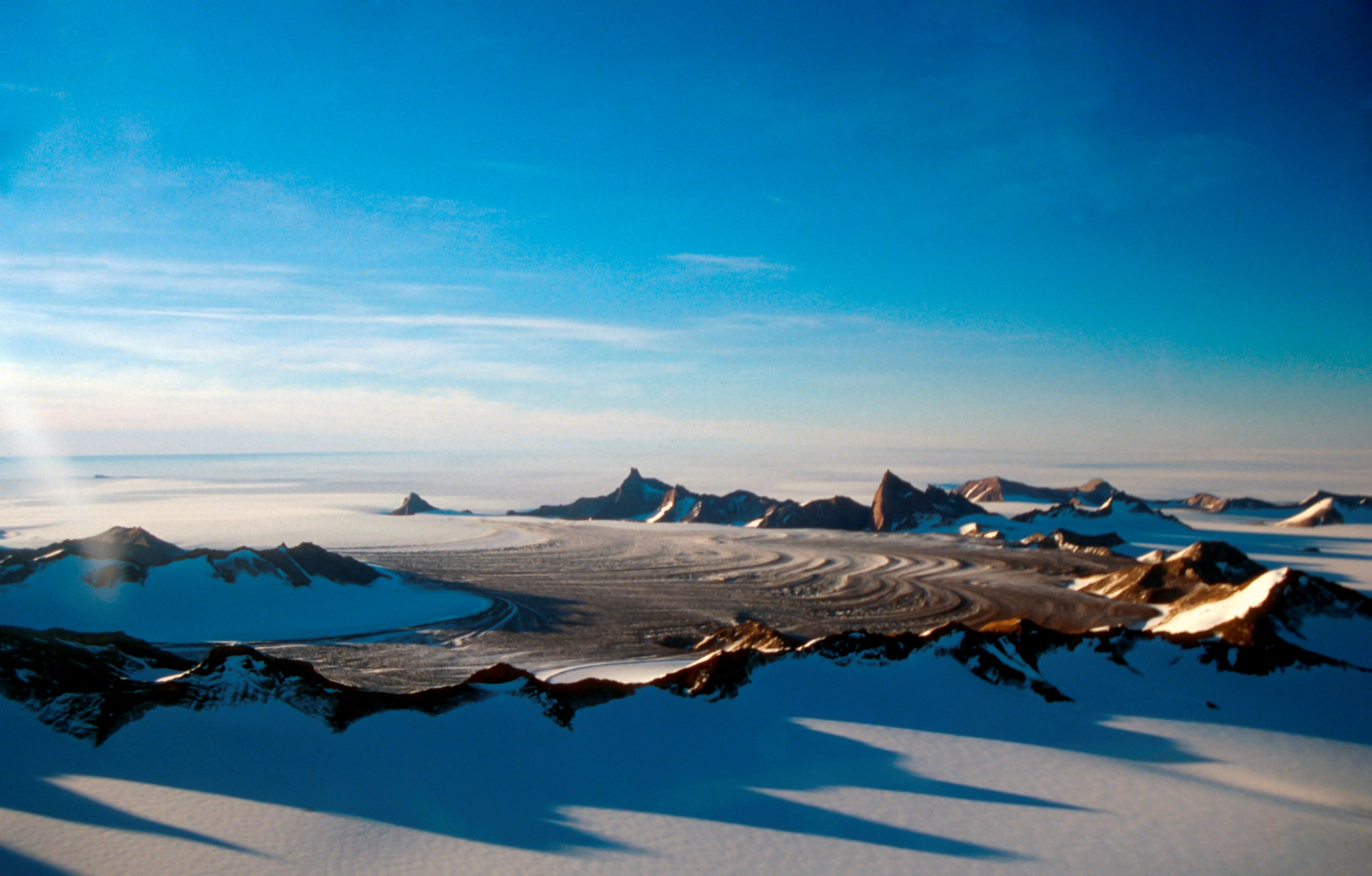
- View over the Schüssel Cirque in northwestern direction

Geography
- Location within Antarctica
- Continent: Antarctica
- Region: Queen Maud Land
- Range coordinates: 71°34′S 11°33′E

Schüssel Cirque (71°34′S 11°33′E) is a large west-facing cirque containing Schüssel Moraine, in the north-central part of the Humboldt Mountains of Queen Maud Land, Antarctica.

== Exploration and naming ==
Schüssel Cirque was discovered by the German Antarctic Expedition (1938–1939) (GerAE) under Alfred Ritscher, 1938–39, who referred to it as "In der Schüssel" (in the bowl) and "Grosse Brei-Schüssel" (great mash bowl). The United States Advisory Committee on Antarctic Names (US-ACAN) has recommended a shorter form of the original names and has added the appropriate generic term.

== Features ==
Features in and around the Schüssel Cirque include:

=== Schüssel Moraine ===
71°34′S 11°32′E. A large morainal deposit occupying Schüssel Cirque. Discovered and first plotted by the GerAE, 1938-39, who named the cirque. The moraine was named in association with Schüssel Cirque by the Soviet Antarctic Expedition (SovAE) which obtained air photos of the feature in 1961.

=== Eckhörner Peaks ===
71°31′S 11°27′E. A series of about six peaks that form the north wall of Schüssel Cirque. Discovered and given the descriptive name Eck-hörner (corner peaks) by the GerAE, 1938-39, under Ritscher.

=== Smørstabben Nunatak ===
71°30′S 10°52′E. An isolated nunatak lying 10 nautical miles (19 km; 12 mi) west of Eckhörner. Discovered and photographed by the GerAE, 1938-39. Mapped by Norway from air photos and surveys by NorAE, 1956-60, and named Smørstabben (the churnstaff).

=== Gorki Ridge ===
71°37′S 11°37′E. A ridge about 8 nautical miles (15 km; 9.2 mi) long forming the east wall of Schüssel Cirque. Discovered and plotted from air photos by GerAE, 1938-39. Mapped from air photos and surveys by NorAE, 1956-60; Remapped by SovAE, 1960-61, and named after Soviet author Maxim Gorky.

=== Vysotskiy Peak ===
71°34′S 11°40′E. A peak, 2,035 metres (6,677 ft) high, in the north part of Gorki Ridge, overlooking Schüssel Moraine. Discovered and plotted from air photos by GerAE, 1938-39. Mapped from air photos and surveys by NorAE, 1956-60. Remapped by SovAE, 1960-61, and named after Soviet geographer G.N. Vysotskiy.

=== Mechnikov Peak ===
71°37′S 11°28′E. Prominent peak, 2,365 metres (7,759 ft) high, at the base of the spur separating Schüssel and Grautskåla Cirque. Discovered and plotted from air photos by GerAE, 1938-39. Mapped from air photos and surveys by NorAE, 1956-60. Remapped by SovAE, 1960-61, and named after Russian geographer L.I. Mechnikov, 1838-88.

== Sources ==
- Alberts, Fred G., ed. (1995), Geographic Names of the Antarctic (PDF) (2 ed.), United States Board on Geographic Names This article incorporates public domain material from websites or documents of the United States Board on Geographic Names.
