= Clifford David Boomsma =

Australian forester, botanist and botanical collector

Clifford David Boomsma (20 October 1915 – 13 January 2004) was an Australian forester, botanist and botanical collector.

Boomsma was born in Gawler in South Australia in 1915 and became a ward of the state at three years of age. He completed his early schooling in Mylor in the Adelaide hills

He was later sponsored and attended high school at Scotch College as a boarder. Following graduation he attended the University of Adelaide completing a Bachelor of Science then went on to study Forestry at the Australian Forestry School, Canberra where he graduated in 1939. He worked at Penola forest and then at Mount Burr forests for the Department of Woods and Forests and was eventually posted to the Adelaide head office.

He later completed his master's degree on the ecology of Fleurieu Peninsula as well as other regions in South Australia and continued working as a forester for the Woods and Forests department for the remainder of his career and wrote several books on the native trees and ecology of his home state. His main areas of interest were species of Acacia and Eucalyptus. He authored two books, Tree planting guide for rural South Australia in 1966 and Native trees of South Australia in 1972, both published by the Woods and Forests department.

He established an arboretum devoted to the endemic South Australian eucalypts near Monarto in the Adelaide hills in the 1980s.

Boomsma described and published 12 species and subspecies as well as making two new combinations. Selected species include; E. mannensis, E. sparsa, E. yumbarrana, E. eremicola, E. yalatensis. E. flindersii, E. calcareana and E. wyolensis.
