= Johnson Peaks =

The Johnson Peaks (71°21′S 12°26′E) are a cluster of detached peaks which mark the northern extremity of the Mittlere Petermann Range, in the Wohlthat Mountains of Queen Maud Land, Antarctica. They were discovered and plotted from air photos by the Third German Antarctic Expedition, 1938–39, were replotted from air photos and surveys by the Sixth Norwegian Antarctic Expedition, 1956–60, and were named for Rolf Johnson, a steward with the Norwegian expedition, 1958–59.
