= Mount Hansen =

Antarctic mountain

Mount Hansen (71°28′S 12°9′E) is a mountain, 1,895 metres (6,220 ft) high, standing 1 nautical mile (2 km) north of Kare Bench and just northwest of Daykovaya Peak at the northern extremity of the Westliche Petermann Range, in the Wohlthat Mountains of Antarctica. It was discovered and plotted from air photos by the Third German Antarctic Expedition, 1938–39. It was replotted from air photos and surveys by the Sixth Norwegian Antarctic Expedition, 1956–60, and named for Kare Hansen, a meteorologist with the Norwegian expedition, 1958–59.
