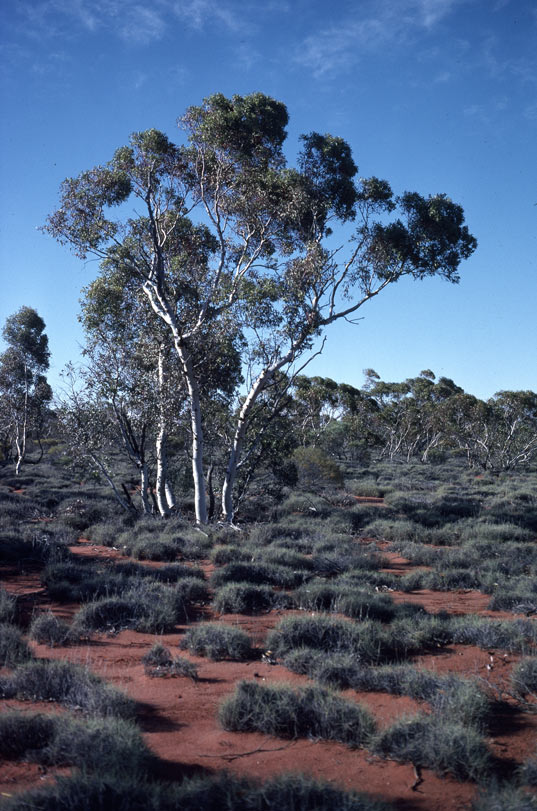
- Eucalyptus gongylocarpa near Plumridge Lakes in South Australia

Scientific classification
- Kingdom: Plantae
- Clade: Embryophytes
- Clade: Tracheophytes
- Clade: Spermatophytes
- Clade: Angiosperms
- Clade: Eudicots
- Clade: Rosids
- Order: Myrtales
- Family: Myrtaceae
- Genus: Eucalyptus
- Species: E. gongylocarpa

Binomial name
- Eucalyptus gongylocarpa Blakely

= Eucalyptus gongylocarpa =

Baarla

Species of eucalyptus

Eucalyptus gongylocarpa, commonly known as baarla, marble gum or desert gum, is a species of tree endemic to central Australia. It has smooth bark, lance-shaped to elliptical leaves arranged more or less in opposite pairs, flower buds in groups of seven, whitish flowers and more or less spherical fruit.

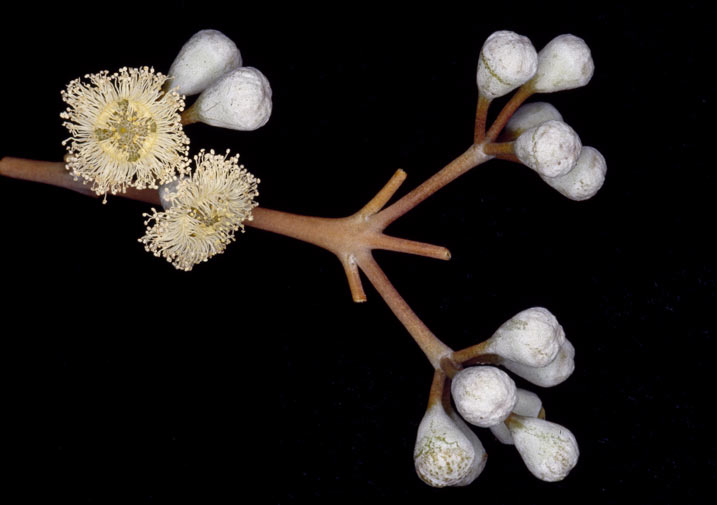
Flower buds and flowers

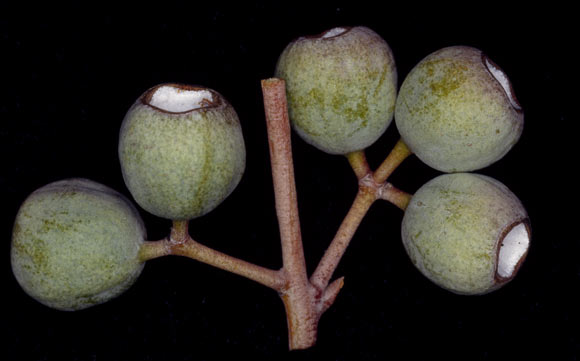
Fruit

== Description ==
Eucalyptus gongylocarpa is a tree that typically grows to a height of 4–16 m (13–52 ft) and has smooth, white bark with red-brown flakes of bark that are loosely attached. Young plants and coppice regrowth have glaucous leaves that are sessile and arranged in opposite pairs, egg-shaped to heart-shaped or almost round, 25–50 mm (0.98–1.97 in) long and 2–5.5 mm (0.079–0.217 in) wide. Adult leaves are also arranged more or less in opposite pairs, glaucous, the same dull greyish to bluish on both sides, lance-shaped to elliptical, 30–80 mm (1.2–3.1 in) long and 8–18 mm (0.31–0.71 in) wide on a petiole 3–14 mm (0.12–0.55 in) long. The flower buds are arranged in leaf axils, usually in groups of seven, on an unbranched peduncle 8–19 mm (0.31–0.75 in) long, the individual buds on pedicels 3–6 mm (0.12–0.24 in) long. Mature buds are club-shaped, 5–6 mm (0.20–0.24 in) long and 3–5 mm (0.12–0.20 in) wide with a rounded operculum. Flowering occurs from January to February and the flowers are whitish. The fruit is a woody, more or less spherical capsule, 6–12 mm (0.24–0.47 in) long and wide.

== Taxonomy and naming ==
Eucalyptus gongylocarpa was first formally described in 1936 by William Blakely in Transactions and Proceedings of the Royal Society of South Australia from a specimen collected by Richard Helms in 1891. The specific epithet gongylocarpa is "from the Greek gongylos meaning 'round' and carpos meaning 'fruit', referring to its distinctively spherical fruits".

== Distribution and habitat ==
Baarla is found on sand plains, sand dunes and rises in arid areas of Western Australia, South Australia and the Northern Territory where it is often the dominant tree in woodland and mallee. In Western Australia it occurs to the east of Sandstone and in South Australia it is common in the Great Victoria Desert. It occurs south from Lake Amadeus in the Northern Territory but is absent from the ranges and sandy plains in the north-west of South Australia.

== See also ==
- List of Eucalyptus species
