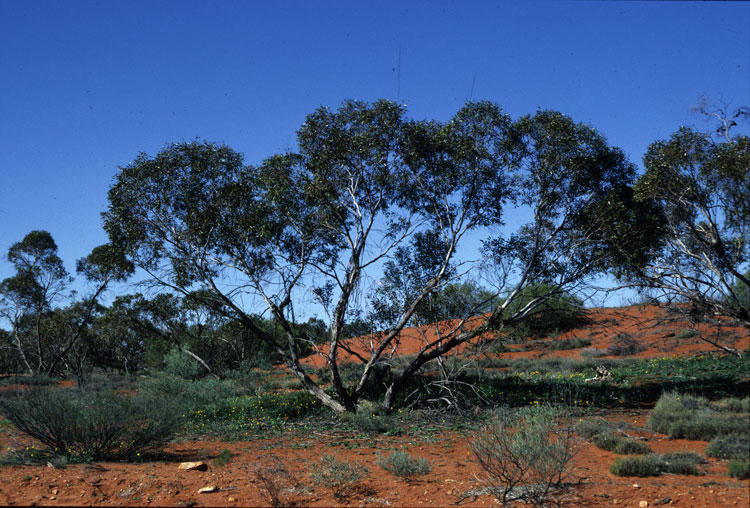

Scientific classification
- Kingdom: Plantae
- Clade: Embryophytes
- Clade: Tracheophytes
- Clade: Spermatophytes
- Clade: Angiosperms
- Clade: Eudicots
- Clade: Rosids
- Order: Myrtales
- Family: Myrtaceae
- Genus: Eucalyptus
- Species: E. mannensis

Binomial name
- Eucalyptus mannensis Boomsma

= Eucalyptus mannensis =

Mann Range mallee

Species of eucalyptus

Eucalyptus mannensis, commonly known as Mann Range mallee, is a species of mallee that is native to Western Australia, South Australia and the Northern Territory. It has rough bark at the base of the trunk, smooth bark above, narrow lance-shaped adult leaves, flower buds in groups of between seven and eleven, creamy white flowers and hemispherical fruit.

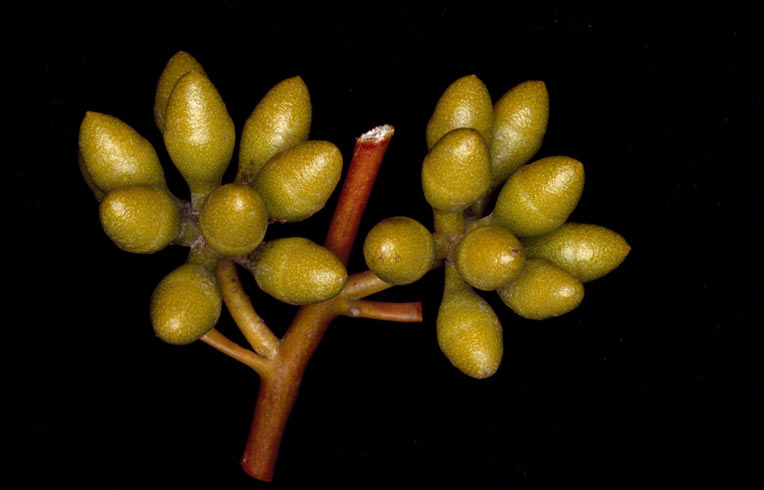
Flower buds

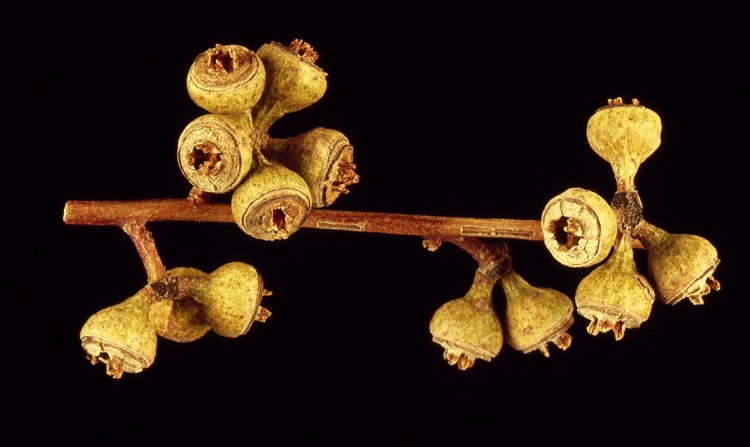
Fruit

== Description ==
Eucalyptus mannensis is a mallee, rarely a straggly tree, that typically grows to a height of 2–10 m (6 ft 7 in – 32 ft 10 in) and forms a lignotuber. It has rough, flaky or fibrous bark on the lower part of the trunk, smooth greyish bark above. Young plants and coppice regrowth have dull, greyish green, lance-shaped leaves that are 45–85 mm (1.8–3.3 in) long and 8–20 mm (0.31–0.79 in) wide. Adult leaves are the same shade of glossy green on both sides, narrow lance-shaped to narrow elliptical, 65–115 mm (2.6–4.5 in) long and 7–23 mm (0.28–0.91 in) wide, tapering to a petiole 7–20 mm (0.28–0.79 in) long. The flower buds are arranged in leaf axils in groups of seven, nine or eleven on an unbranched peduncle 3–10 mm (0.12–0.39 in) long, the individual buds on pedicels 1–5 mm (0.039–0.197 in) long. Mature buds are oval, 5–8 mm (0.20–0.31 in) long and 3–5 mm (0.12–0.20 in) wide with a conical or rounded operculum. Flowering occurs from April to October and the flowers are creamy white. The fruit is a woody, hemispherical capsule 3–6 mm (0.12–0.24 in) long and 5–8 mm (0.20–0.31 in) wide.

== Taxonomy and naming ==
Eucalyptus mannensis was first formally described in 1964 by Cliff Boomsma from a specimen collected on Angas Downs Head Station. The description was published in Transactions of the Royal Society of South Australia. The specific epithet (mannensis) refers to the Mann Ranges in South Australia.

In 1992, Lawrie Johnson and Ken Hill described two subspecies and the names have been accepted by the Australian Plant Census:

- Eucalyptus mannensis Boomsma subsp. mannensis has glossy adult leaves, the largest of which are usually more than 12 mm (0.47 in) wide;
- Eucalyptus mannensis subsp. vespertina L.A.S.Johnson & K.D.Hill has adult leaves that are dull at first, the largest adult leaves less than 12 mm (0.47 in) wide.

== Distribution and habitat ==
Mann Range mallee grows on plains and dunes in open shrubland and has a wide distribution in the central ranges of Australia, including in South Australia, the Northern Territory and Western Australia. There are also disjunct populations in the Great Victoria Desert, near Wiluna and near Shark Bay. Subspecies vespertina is restricted to near-coastal areas between the Murchison River and Shark Bay.

== Conservation status ==
Both subspecies of E. mannensis are classified as "not threatened" in Western Australia by the Western Australian Government Department of Parks and Wildlife.

== See also ==
- List of Eucalyptus species
