= Eucalyptus ultima =

Scientific classification
- Kingdom: Plantae
- Clade: Tracheophytes
- Clade: Angiosperms
- Clade: Eudicots
- Clade: Rosids
- Order: Myrtales
- Family: Myrtaceae
- Genus: Eucalyptus
- Species: E. ultima

Binomial name
- Eucalyptus ultima L.A.S.Johnson & K.D.Hill

Species of eucalyptus

Eucalyptus ultima is a species of mallee that is endemic to a small area in the Gascoyne region of Western Australia. It has smooth bark, linear to narrow lance-shaped leaves, flower buds in groups of nine to fifteen, white flowers and spherical to cup-shaped fruit.

== Description ==
Eucalyptus ultima is a mallee that typically grows to a height of 2.5–7 m (8 ft 2 in – 23 ft 0 in) and forms a lignotuber. It has smooth grey to pinkish bark, sometimes with rough, fibrous bark near the base. Adult leaves are the same shade of green on both sides, linear to narrow lance-shaped, 55–105 mm (2.2–4.1 in) long and 5–12 mm (0.20–0.47 in) wide, tapering to petiole 3–10 mm (0.12–0.39 in) long. The flower buds are arranged in leaf axils in groups of nine to fifteen on an unbranched peduncle 4–10 mm (0.16–0.39 in) long, the individual buds on pedicels 2–4 mm (0.079–0.157 in) long. Mature buds are oval, 5–10 mm (0.20–0.39 in) long and about 3 mm (0.12 in) wide with a conical to horn-shaped operculum that is longer than the floral cup. Flowering occurs from April to August and the flowers are white. The fruit is a woody shortened spherical to cup-shaped capsule 5–6 mm (0.20–0.24 in) long and 4–5 mm (0.16–0.20 in) wide with the valves protruding but fragile.

== Taxonomy and naming ==
Eucalyptus ultima was first formally described in 1999 by Lawrie Johnson and Ken Hill in the journal Telopea from specimens collected by Ian Brooker in the Shothole Canyon in the Cape Range National Park in 1977. The specific epithet (ultima) is from the Latin ultimus meaning "farthest" or "most distant", referring to its occurrence compared to related eucalypts.

== Distribution and habitat ==
This mallee is only known from rocky rises in the Cape Range National Park, where it grows in skeletal soils over limestone.

== Conservation status ==
This eucalypt is classified as "not threatened" by the Western Australian Government Department of Parks and Wildlife.

== See also ==
- List of Eucalyptus species
