= Aurdalsegga Ridge =

Ridge in Antarctica

Aurdalsegga Ridge (71°44′S 12°23′E) is an irregular ridge 8 km (5 mi) long surmounted by Mount Nikolayev, rising immediately southeast of Aurdalen Valley in the Südliche Petermann Range of the Wohlthat Mountains in Antarctica. It was discovered and plotted from air photos by the Third German Antarctic Expedition, 1938–39, re-plotted from air photos and from surveys by the Sixth Norwegian Antarctic Expedition, 1956–60, and named "Aurdalsegga" ("the gravel valley ridge").
