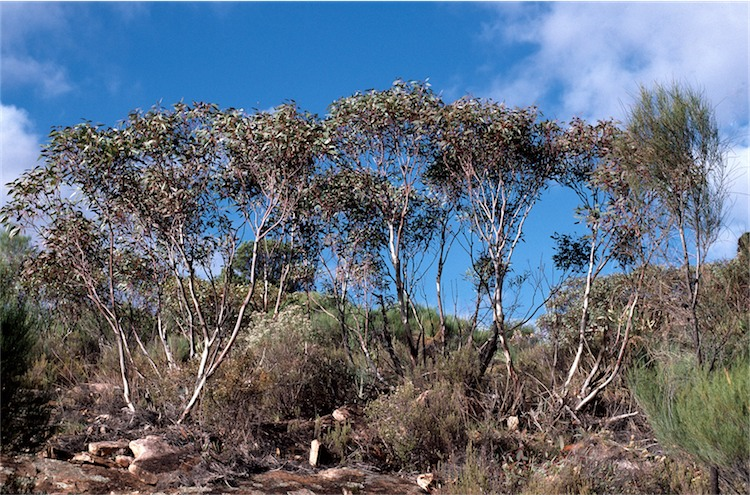
- Eucalyptus flindersii near Wilpena Pound

Scientific classification
- Kingdom: Plantae
- Clade: Embryophytes
- Clade: Tracheophytes
- Clade: Spermatophytes
- Clade: Angiosperms
- Clade: Eudicots
- Clade: Rosids
- Order: Myrtales
- Family: Myrtaceae
- Genus: Eucalyptus
- Species: E. flindersii

Binomial name
- Eucalyptus flindersii Boomsma

= Eucalyptus flindersii =

South Australian grey mallee

Species of eucalyptus

Eucalyptus flindersii, commonly known as the South Australian grey mallee, mallee red gum, or grey mallee, is a species of mallee that is endemic to South Australia. It usually has smooth, pinkish grey bark, lance-shaped to curved adult leaves, flower buds in groups of three or seven and conical or hemispherical fruit with the valves protruding.

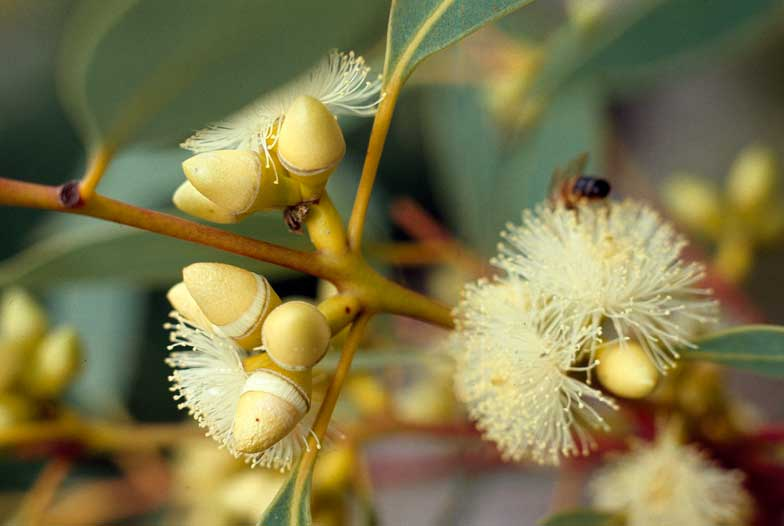
Flowers and buds

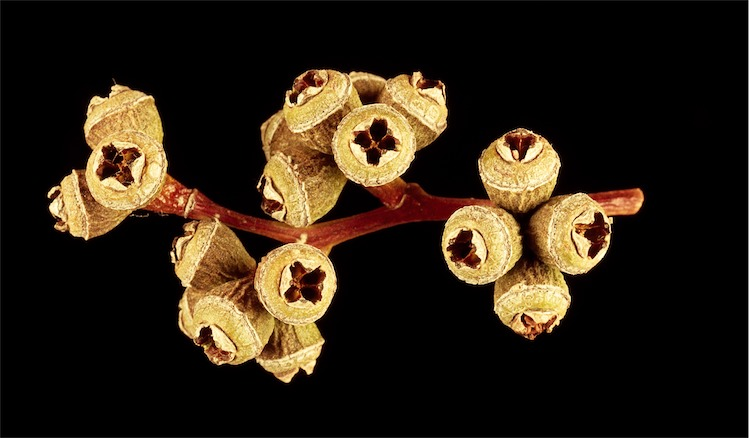
Fruit

== Description ==
Eucalyptus flindersii is a mallee, rarely a small tree, and typically grows to a height of 1–5 m (3 ft 3 in – 16 ft 5 in) and usually has smooth, dull, grey bark that sheds in flakes to reveal a paler layer, sometimes with rough bark at the base of the trunk. Young plants and coppice regrowth have stems that are more or less square in cross-section, and leaves that are petiolate, egg-shaped, 45–110 mm (1.8–4.3 in) long and 25–70 mm (0.98–2.76 in) wide. Adult leaves are the same dull to slightly glossy, green to blue-green colour on both sides, lance-shaped to curved, 55–180 mm (2.2–7.1 in) long and 10–30 mm (0.39–1.18 in) wide on a petiole 10–38 mm (0.39–1.50 in) wide. The flower buds are arranged in leaf axils in groups of three or seven on an unbranched peduncle 4–18 mm (0.16–0.71 in) long, the individual buds sessile or on pedicels up to 5 mm (0.20 in) long. Mature buds are oval, 7–13 mm (0.28–0.51 in) long and 4–6 mm (0.16–0.24 in) wide with a rounded to conical operculum. Flowering occurs between August and October and the flowers are white. The fruit is a woody hemispherical to conical capsule 3–70 mm (0.12–2.76 in) long and 4–10 mm (0.16–0.39 in) wide with the valves protruding above the rim of the fruit.

== Taxonomy and naming ==
Eucalyptus flindersii was first formally described in 1980 by Clifford Boomsma in the Journal of the Adelaide Botanic Gardens from a specimen collected by Roger Callen on Mount Hack in the Flinders Ranges. The specific epithet (flindersii) honours Captain Matthew Flinders, after whom the Flinders Ranges, where this species occurs, was named.

== Distribution and habitat ==
The South Australian grey mallee grows on slopes and between rocks in open woodland, mainly in the Flinders Ranges but with outliers to the south near Yunta and Quorn.

== See also ==
- List of Eucalyptus species
