= Store Svarthorn Peak =

Mountain in Queen Maud Land, Antarctica

Store Svarthorn Peak (71°35′S 12°33′E) is a very prominent black peak (2,490 m) rising abruptly at the southwest extremity of Mittlere Petermann Range, in the Wohlthat Mountains of Queen Maud Land, a region of Antarctica claimed by Norway. It was discovered and given the descriptive name "Grosses Schwarz-Horn" (great black peak) by the German Antarctic Expedition under Ritscher, 1938–39. The peak was remapped by the Norwegian Antarctic Expedition, 1956–60, who used the form Store Svarthorn. The Norwegian spelling has been recommended by Advisory Committee on Antarctic Names (US-ACAN) to agree with associated features in the area having this name.

== See also ==
- Svarthornbotnen Cirque
