= Eucalyptus longissima =

Scientific classification
- Kingdom: Plantae
- Clade: Tracheophytes
- Clade: Angiosperms
- Clade: Eudicots
- Clade: Rosids
- Order: Myrtales
- Family: Myrtaceae
- Genus: Eucalyptus
- Species: E. longissima

Binomial name
- Eucalyptus longissima D.Nicolle

Species of eucalyptus

Eucalyptus longissima is a species of mallee or small tree that is endemic to the south-west of Western Australia. It has rough, fibrous or stringy bark on the trunk, smooth greyish brown bark above, glossy green, lance-shaped adult leaves, flower buds in group of between seven and thirteen, white flowers and shortened spherical fruit.

== Description ==
Eucalyptus longissima is a mallee that typically grows to a height of 8 m (26 ft) and forms a lignotuber. It has smooth greyish brown bark, usually with rough, fibrous or stringy bark on most of the trunk. The adult leaves are lance-shaped, 55–110 mm (2.2–4.3 in) long, 7–16 mm (0.28–0.63 in) wide on a petiole 10–20 mm (0.39–0.79 in) long. The flower buds are arranged in groups of between seven and fifteen in leaf axils on an unbranched peduncle 7–17 mm (0.28–0.67 in) long, the individual buds on pedicels 3–7 mm (0.12–0.28 in) long. Mature buds are narrow oval to spindle-shaped, 7–12 mm (0.28–0.47 in) long, 2–6 mm (0.079–0.236 in) wide with a conical to horn-shaped operculum 4–9 mm (0.16–0.35 in) long. Flowering has been observed in most months and the flowers are white. The fruit is a woody, shortened spherical capsule 4–6 mm (0.16–0.24 in) long and wide.

== Taxonomy and naming ==
Eucalyptus longissima was first formally described in 2005 by Dean Nicolle in Australian Systematic Botany. The specific epithet (longissima) is the superlative form of the Latin word longus, hence "longest", referring to the juvenile leaves, peduncles and pedicels.

== Distribution and habitat ==
This eucalypt grows in sand or loam over limestone in the Coolgardie, Great Victoria Desert, Murchison and Yalgoo biogeographic regions of Western Australia.

== Conservation status ==
This eucalypt is classified as "not threatened" in Western Australia by the Western Australian Government Department of Parks and Wildlife.

== See also ==
- List of Eucalyptus species
