= Petermann Ranges (Antarctica) =

Mountain ranges in Queen Maud Land, Antarctica

Coordinates: 71°40′S 12°20′E

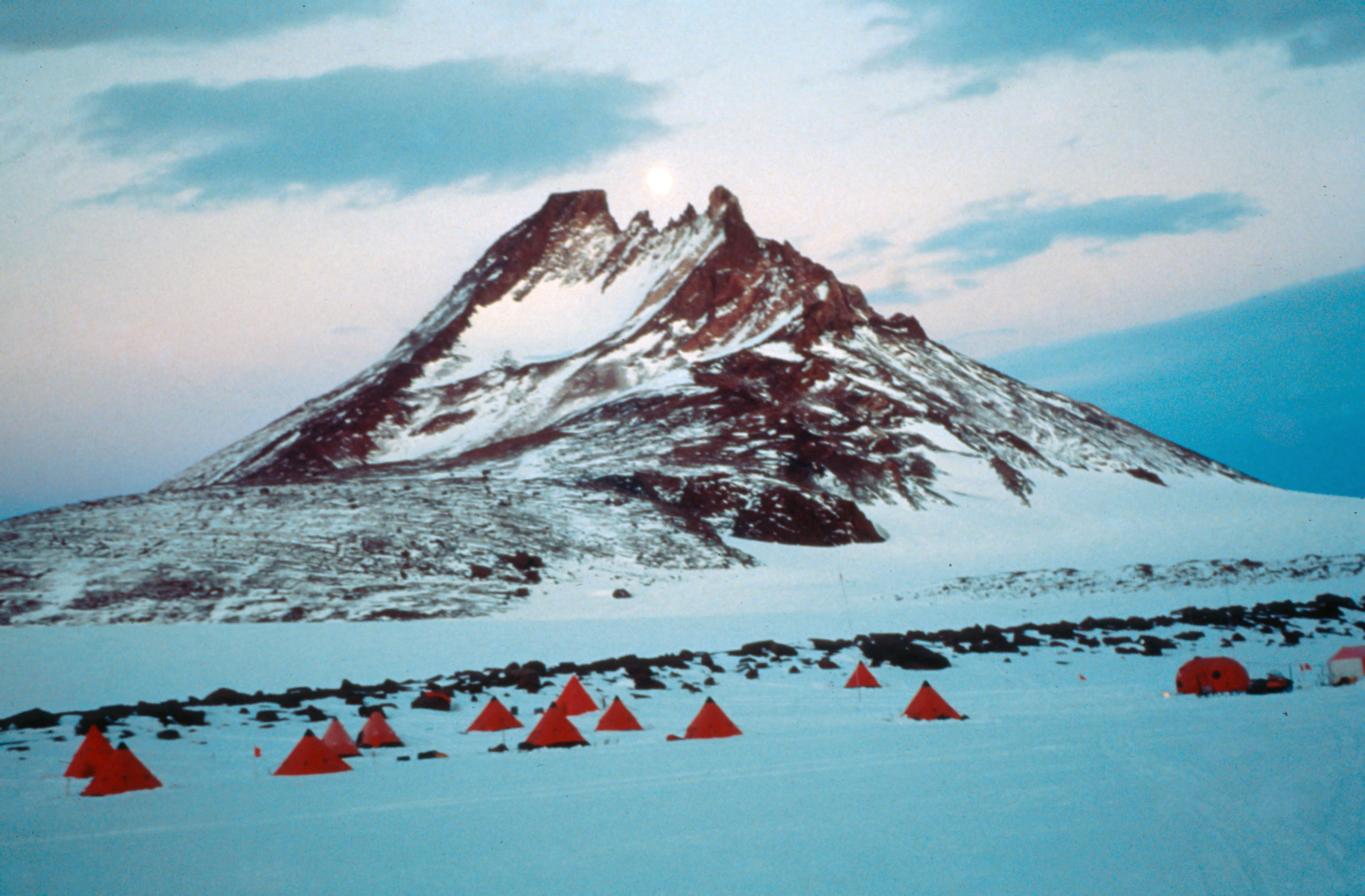
The fieldcamp of the GeoMaud expedition 1995/96 in the northern Petermann Chains, Antarctica

The Petermann Ranges (German: Petermannketten) are a number of associated mountain ranges including the Östliche Petermann, Mittlere Petermann, Westliche Petermann, Südliche Petermann, and Pieck Ranges, located just east of the Humboldt Mountains in the central Wohlthat Mountains of Queen Maud Land.

These mountain ranges were discovered and plotted from air photos by the Third German Antarctic Expedition (1938–1939), led by Capt. Alfred Ritscher, who named it for August Petermann.

== Geographical features ==
Name	Peak elevation
Astor Rocks	
Graben Horn	2,815m
Humboldt Graben	
Mount Skeidskneet	2,600m
Skeidshornet Peak	2,725m
Sørhortane	
Vestbanen Moraine	
Zwiesel Mountain	2,970m
