= Mittlere Petermann Range =

Mountain range in Antarctica

The Mittlere Petermann Range (German: Mittlere Petermannkette, 71°30′S 12°28′E) is one of the Petermann Ranges in Antarctica, extending north–south for 17 nautical miles (31 km) from the Johnson Peaks to Store Svarthorn Peak, in the Wohlthat Mountains, Queen Maud Land. The range was discovered and plotted from air photos by the Third German Antarctic Expedition of 1938–39, and so named by them for its middle position in the northern part of the Petermann Ranges.
