= Westliche Petermann Range =

Mountain range in Antarctica

Westliche Petermann Range (German: Westliche Petermannkette, "Western Petermann Range", 71°35′S 12°10′E) is one of the Petermann Ranges, extending north–south for 16 nautical miles (30 km) from Mount Hansen to Aurdalen Valley, in the Wohlthat Mountains, Queen Maud Land. Discovered and plotted from air photos by German Antarctic Expedition, 1938–39, and so named by them for its western position in the northern part of the Petermann Ranges.
