= Slithallet Slope =

Ice slope in Queen Maud Land, Antarctica

Slithallet Slope (72°3′S 2°57′E) is an ice slope between Jutulsessen Mountain and Risemedet Mountain in the Gjelsvik Mountains, Queen Maud Land. Photographed from the air by the German Antarctic Expedition (1938–39). Mapped by Norwegian cartographers from surveys and air photos by Norwegian-British-Swedish Antarctic Expedition (1949–1952) and named Slithallet (the drudgery slope).
