= Fjellimellom Valley =

Valley in Queen Maud Land, Antarctica

Coordinates: 72°5′S 2°29′E

Fjellimellom Valley is an ice-filled valley between Jutulsessen Mountain and Nupskammen Ridge in the Gjelsvik Mountains of Queen Maud Land, Antarctica. It was photographed from the air by the Third German Antarctic Expedition (1938–39). It was mapped by Norwegian cartographers from surveys and air photos by the Norwegian–British–Swedish Antarctic Expedition (1949–52), and from air photos by the Norwegian expedition (1958–59) and named Fjellimellom (between the mountains).
