= Armlenet =

Coordinates: 71°59′S 2°52′E

Armlenet is a ridge trending north–south for 3 nautical miles (6 km) between Stabben and Jutulhogget, forming the eastern arm of Jutulsessen in the Gjelsvik Mountains, Queen Maud Land. It was mapped by Norwegian cartographers from surveys and from air photos by the Norwegian–British–Swedish Antarctic Expedition (1949–52) and by the Sixth Norwegian Antarctic Expedition (1958–59) and named Armlenet (the armrest). To the north lays Stabben.
