= Porten Pass =

Mountain pass in Queen Maud Land, Antarktis

Porten Pass (72°12′S 2°23′E) is a mountain pass between Von Essen Mountain and Nupskammen Ridge in the Gjelsvik Mountains, Queen Maud Land. Photographed from the air by the German Antarctic Expedition (1938–39). Mapped by Norwegian cartographers from surveys and air photos by Norwegian-British-Swedish Antarctic Expedition (NBSAE) (1949–52) and air photos by the Norwegian expedition (1958–59) and named Porten (the gateway).
