= Risen Peak =

Peak in Queen Maud Land, Antarctica

Risen Peak (71°58′S 3°18′E) is a peak 2 nautical miles (3.7 km) north of Medhovden Bluff in the Gjelsvik Mountains of Queen Maud Land. Mapped from surveys and air photos by the Norwegian Antarctic Expedition (1956–60) and named Risen (the giant).

== See also ==
- Gygra Peak
