= Bakhallet Slope =

Ice slope in Queen Maud Land, Antarctica

Bakhallet Slope (72°8′S 2°56′E) is an ice slope between Terningskarvet Mountain and Brugda Ridge in the Gjelsvik Mountains, Queen Maud Land. It was photographed from the air by the Third German Antarctic Expedition (1938–39), mapped by Norwegian cartographers from surveys and from air photos by the Norwegian-British-Swedish Antarctic Expedition (1949–52) and by the Norwegian expedition (1958–59) and named "Bakhallet" (the "back slope").
