= Bundermann Range =

Mountain range in Antarctica

The Bundermann Range (72°1′S 2°42′E) is a small mountain range located immediately north of Nupskammen Ridge and Terningskarvet Mountain in the Gjelsvik Mountains of Queen Maud Land, Antarctica. The name Bundermannketten was applied to a range of mountains in this area by the Third German Antarctic Expedition (1938–39) under Alfred Ritscher. The correlation of the name with this feature may be arbitrary, but it is recommended for the sake of international uniformity and historical continuity. It was named for Max Bundermann, aerial photographer on the Passat, one of the flying boats used by the German expedition.
