= Sætet =

Cirque in Antarctica

Coordinates: 72°1′S 2°42′E

Sætet, also known as Saetet Cirque, is a large cirque in the north side of Jutulsessen, in the Gjelsvik Mountains, Queen Maud Land, Antarctica. Photographed from the air by the Third German Antarctic Expedition (1938–39). Mapped by Norwegian cartographers from surveys and air photos by the Norwegian-British-Swedish Antarctic Expedition (NBSAE) (1949–1952), led by John Schjelderup Giæver and air photos by the Norwegian expedition (1958–59) and named Sætet, meaning "the seat".
