= Medmulen Spurs =

The Medmulen Spurs (72°1′S 3°8′E) are a group of rock spurs extending from the north side of Risemedet Mountain, in the Gjelsvik Mountains of Queen Maud Land, Antarctica. They were mapped by Norwegian cartographers from surveys and air photos by the Sixth Norwegian Antarctic Expedition (1956–60) and named "Medmulen" (the landmark snout).
