= Medhalsen Saddle =

Medhalsen Saddle (72°9′S 3°10′E) is an ice saddle just south of Risemedet Mountain in the Gjelsvik Mountains of Queen Maud Land, Antarctica. It was mapped by Norwegian cartographers from surveys and aerial photographs by the Sixth Norwegian Antarctic Expedition (1956–60) and named "Medhalsen" (the landmark neck).
