= Medhovden Bluff =

Medhovden Bluff (72°1′S 3°18′E) is a high ice-covered bluff with a steep, eastern rock face, forming the northeastern end of Risemedet Mountain in the Gjelsvik Mountains of Queen Maud Land, Antarctica. It was mapped by Norwegian cartographers from surveys and air photos by the Sixth Norwegian Antarctic Expedition (1956–60) and was named "Medhovden" (the landmark bluff).
