= Stabben =

Mountain in Queen Maud Land, Antarctica

Coordinates: 71°57′S 2°52′E

Stabben is a prominent mountain immediately north of Mayr Ridge in the north part of the Gjelsvik Mountains, Queen Maud Land, which constitutes the northernmost part of Jutulsessen. Photographed from the air by the German Antarctic Expedition (1938–39). Mapped by Norwegian cartographers from surveys and air photos by the Norwegian-British-Swedish Antarctic Expedition (NBSAE) (1949–1952), led by John Schjelderup Giæver and air photos by the Norwegian expedition (1958–59) and named "Stabben" (the stump).

== See also ==
- Rabben Ridge, about 5 nautical miles (9 km) north of Stabben Mountain
