= Rabben Ridge =

Mountain in antarctica

Rabben Ridge (71°52′S 2°49′E) is a small, isolated ridge about 5 nautical miles (9 km) north of Stabben Mountain in the north part of the Gjelsvik Mountains, Queen Maud Land. Mapped by Norwegian cartographers from surveys and air photos by Norwegian-British-Swedish Antarctic Expedition (NBSAE) (1949–52) and air photos by the Norwegian expedition (1958–59) and named Rabben (the small elongated elevation).
