= Gygra Peak =

Mountain in Antarctica

Gygra Peak (71°58′S 3°16′E) is a rock peak, 1,980 metres (6,500 ft) high, just west of Risen Peak in the Gjelsvik Mountains of Queen Maud Land, Antarctica. It was mapped from surveys and air photos by the Sixth Norwegian Antarctic Expedition (1956–60) and named Gygra (the giantess).
