= Jutulhogget (Antarctica) =

Mountain in Queen Maud Land, Antarctica

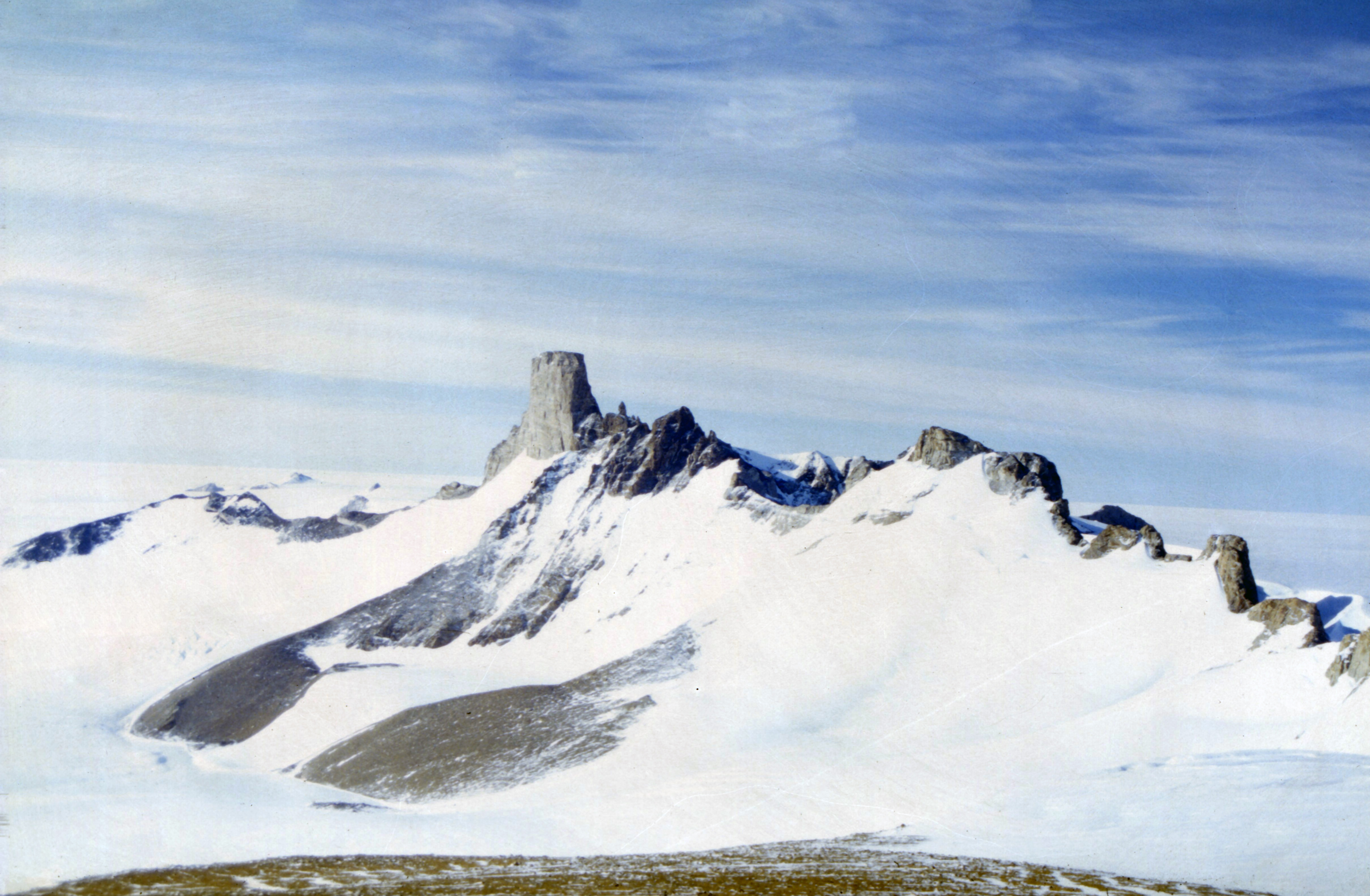
View of the northeastern part of the Jutulsessen Mountain

Jutulhogget, also known as Jutulhogget Peak, (72°2′S 2°51′E) is a high peak in the eastern ridge of Jutulsessen Mountain, in the Gjelsvik Mountains of Queen Maud Land. It was photographed from the air by the Third German Antarctic Expedition (1938–39). It was mapped by Norwegian cartographers from surveys and air photos by the Norwegian–British–Swedish Antarctic Expedition (1958–59) and named after Jutulhogget, Norway's largest canyon.
