= Mayr Ridge =

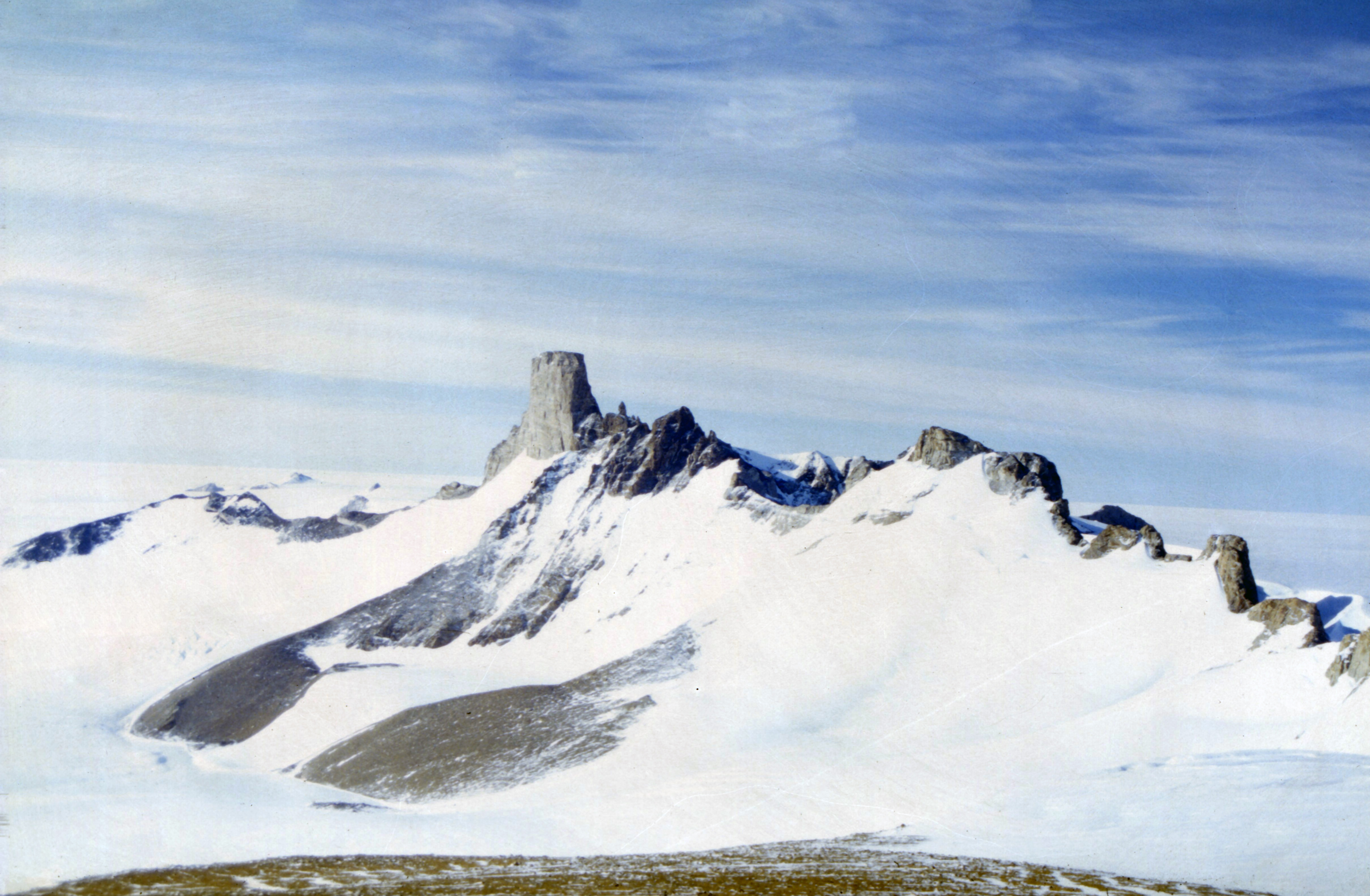
Mayr Ridge, view in northeastern direction

Mayr Ridge (72°11′S 2°22′E) is a mountainous ridge including Nupskammen Ridge and Von Essen Mountain, forming the southwestern extremity of the Gjelsvik Mountains in Queen Maud Land, Antarctica. The name "Mayrkette" was applied in the general area by the Third German Antarctic Expedition under Alfred Ritscher, 1938–39, for Rudolf Mayr, the pilot of the flying boat Passat used by the expedition. The correlation of the name with this feature may be arbitrary but is recommended for the sake of international uniformity and historical continuity.
