= Brugda Ridge =

Brugda Ridge (72°5′S 2°50′E) is a ridge extending east-southeast from the south side of Jutulsessen Mountain in the Gjelsvik Mountains, Queen Maud Land. It was photographed from the air by the Third German Antarctic Expedition (1938–39), mapped by Norwegian cartographers from surveys and air photos by the Norwegian–British–Swedish Antarctic Expedition (1949–52) and from air photos by the Norwegian expedition (1958–59), and named Brugda (basking shark).
