= Jutulsessen =

Mountain of Antarctica

Coordinates: 72°2′S 2°41′E

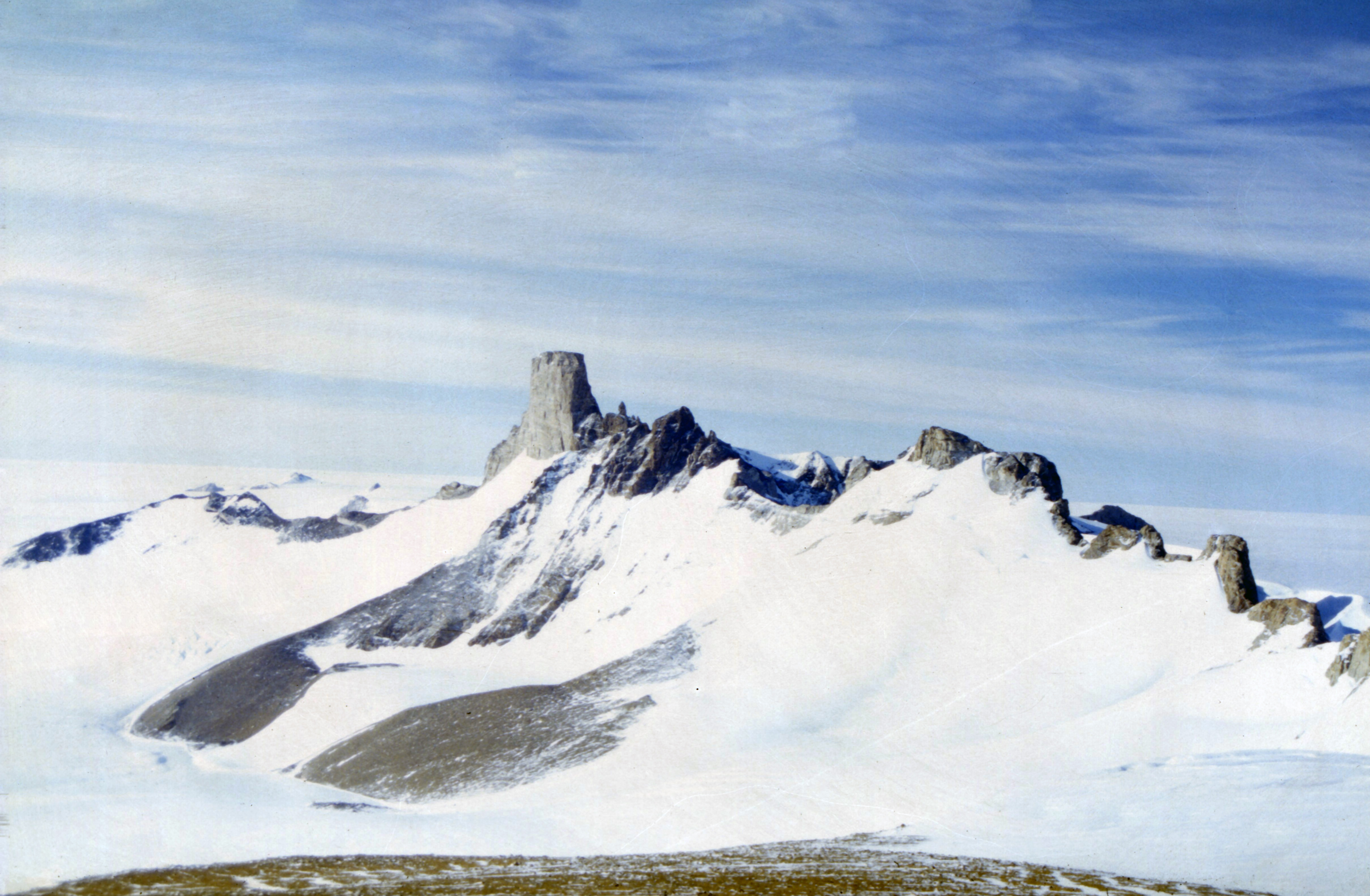
View of the north-western part of Jutulsessen from the south-east

Jutulsessen is a nunatak in the Gjelsvik Mountains in Queen Maud Land, Antarctica. It is located in Princess Martha Coast, 235 kilometers (146 mi) from the King Haakon VII Sea. Jutulsessen is the site of the Norwegian research station Troll and the affiliated Troll Satellite Station, which has two radomes on top of the mountain. Troll Airfield is located in the vicinity.

== Geography ==
Jutulsessen is a nunatak mountain with a peak 2,370 meters (7,780 ft) above mean sea level. It is located 13 kilometers (8.1 mi) north of Terningskarvet, also in the Gjelsvik Mountains of Queen Maud Land. Jutulsessen is located in the eastern part of Princess Martha Coast in Queen Maud Land, which Norway claims as a dependent territory. The main ice-free area of the Jutulsessen massif is about 10 km long by 5 km across. The base is located 1,270 meters (4,170 ft) above mean sea level and is completely surrounded by the Antarctic ice sheet. Jutulsessen is 235 kilometers (146 mi) from the coast of King Haakon VII Sea.

The mountain area is horseshoe-shaped with a glacier and cirque of Sætet to the north. The two arms of the area are located northwards. The western arm is the location of Troll. The eastern arm is longer and consists of the narrow section of Jutulhogget and the wider Armlenet. Further north lies the isolated area of Stabben. Blåfallet is an ice-depression on the western side of Knokane, a ridge of Armlenet. Jutuldalen is a valley in Armlenet, with the ice-depression of Staupet to the west. Armlenet also features the glacier of Ringfingerbreen. Southeast of Sætet lies the broad valley of Brudgedalen, and to the southeast lies the ridge of Brudga. The three peaks closest to Troll are Trolltindane, the tallest of which is Trolltinden.

The area has a cold and dry climate being located in a desert. The annual mean temperature is −25 °C (−13 °F), with the summer temperature able to reach about 0 °C (32 °F) and the lowest during the winter at −50 °C (−58 °F). Storms, which can occur throughout the year, can occasionally make outdoor activity impossible. Being located south of the Antarctic Circle, Troll has midnight sun in the summer and polar night during the winter.

== History ==
The mountain was first photographed by the German Antarctic Expedition in 1938–39. It was subsequently mapped by Norwegian cartographers from surveys and air photographs taken during the Norwegian–British–Swedish Antarctic Expedition in 1949–52 and the subsequent Norwegian expedition in 1958–59. It was given the Norwegian name Jutulsessen, which means "the seat of the giant".

Norway established the Antarctic polar station Maudheim in 1950. It was located on ice and used only during the summer. After a few years, it was so covered in snow that it was not possible to dig out. When searching for a new station, the Norwegian Polar Institute decided to find an area which would be snow-free in January and February and which was close to blue ice that would allow the establishment of an airfield. The area was explored by helicopter on January 11, 1990, and the expedition decided to establish a base on the lower parts of Jutulessen. Troll was officially opened on February 17, 1990. Troll Airfield was opened on February 11, 2005 and an all-year research station the following day.

== Troll ==
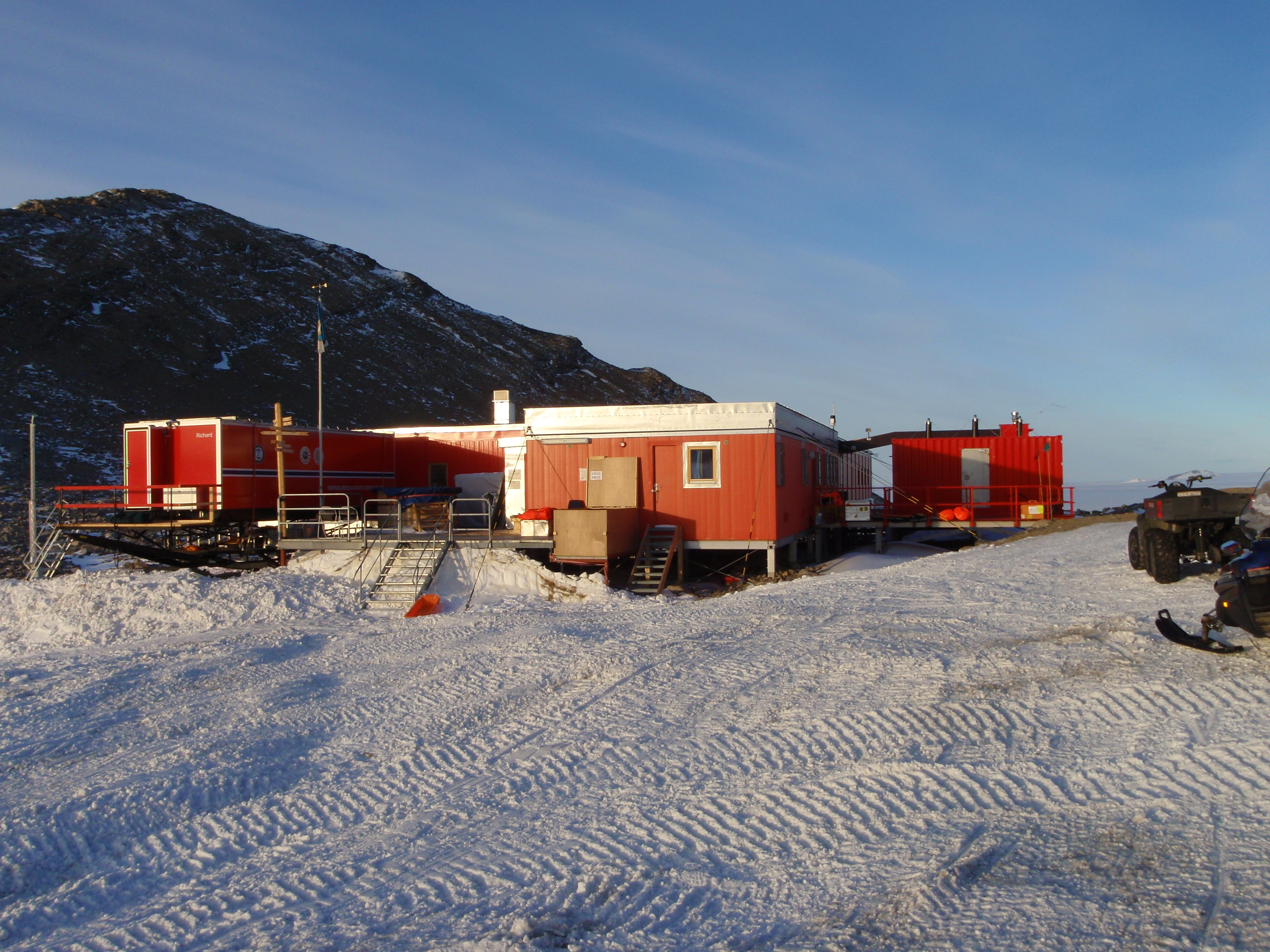
Troll

The station took its name from the surrounding jagged mountains, which resemble trolls of Norse mythology. The station facilities are owned by the Government of Norway through the Norwegian Directorate of Public Construction and Property. Operation of the facility is carried out by the Norwegian Polar Institute. The facilities consist of a module-built new section that is 300 square meters (3,200 sq ft), and the old section that is 100 square meters (1,100 sq ft). Troll Airfield is located 6.8 kilometres (4.2 mi) from Troll and consists of a 3,300-by-100-metre (10,830 by 330 ft) runway on glacial blue ice.

Research facilities include air and atmospheric measurement equipment operated by the Norwegian Institute for Air Research. Kongsberg Satellite Services operates Troll Satellite Station, a satellite ground station providing research from low Earth orbit satellites. The Norwegian Meteorological Institute operates a staffed weather station.

== Important Bird Area ==
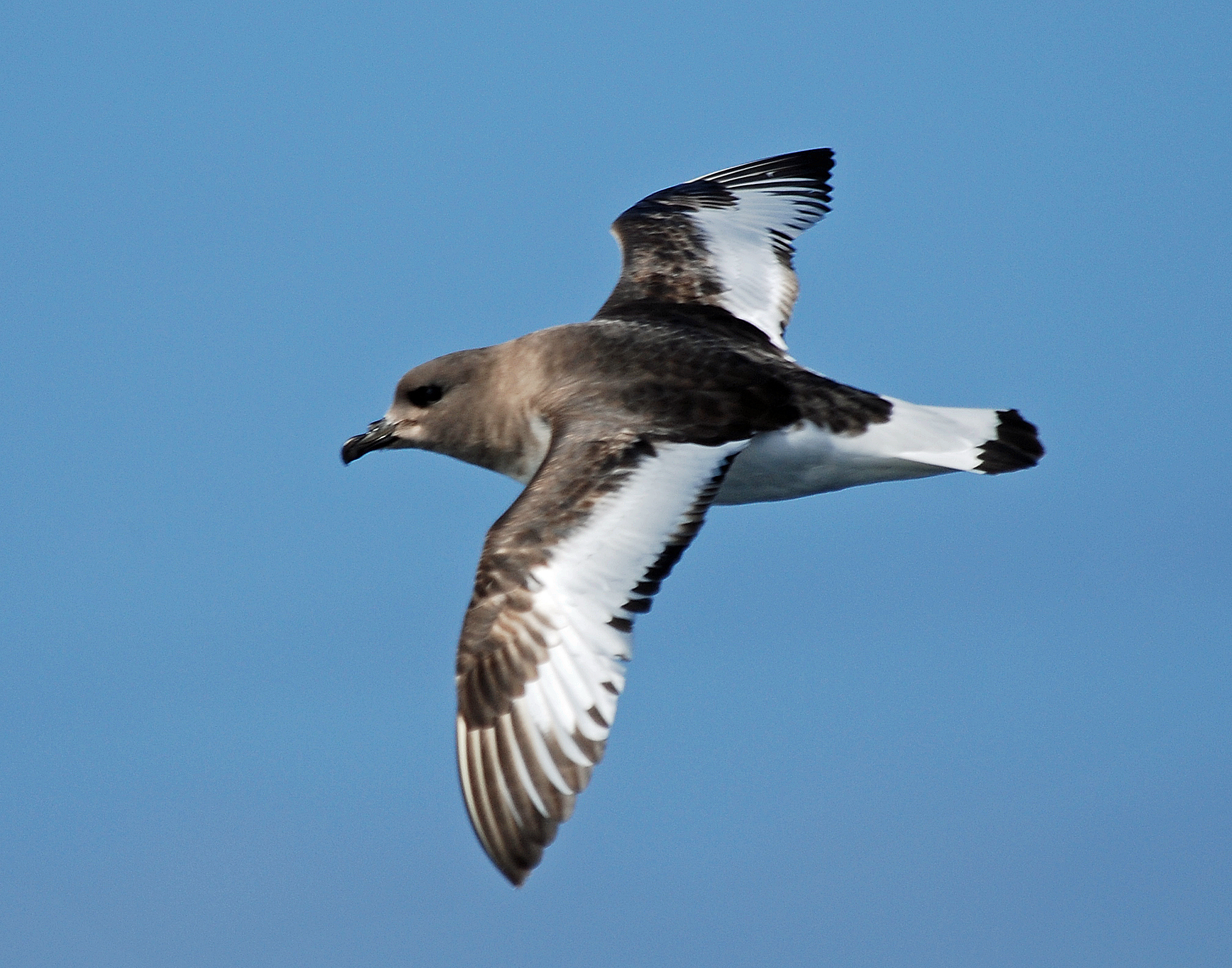
Antarctic petrels breed in the IBA

A 500 ha site some 6 km south-east of Troll Station has been designated an Important Bird Area (IBA) by BirdLife International, because it supports a large breeding colony of about 38,000 pairs of Antarctic petrels on north-facing slopes in the mountains. Snow petrels and south polar skuas also breed in the vicinity.
