= Terningskarvet Mountain =

Mountain in Queen Maud Land, Antarctica

Terningskarvet Mountain (72°11′S 2°46′E) is a large complex mountain just east of Mayr Ridge, forming the southeast portion of the Gjelsvik Mountains in Queen Maud Land, Antarctica.

It was mapped by Norwegian cartographers from surveys and air photos by Norwegian-British-Swedish Antarctic Expedition (1949–1952) and by Norwegian Antarctic Expedition (1958–59) and named "Terningskarvet" ("the dice cliff").
