= Risemedet Mountain =

Mountain in Queen Maud Land, Antarctica

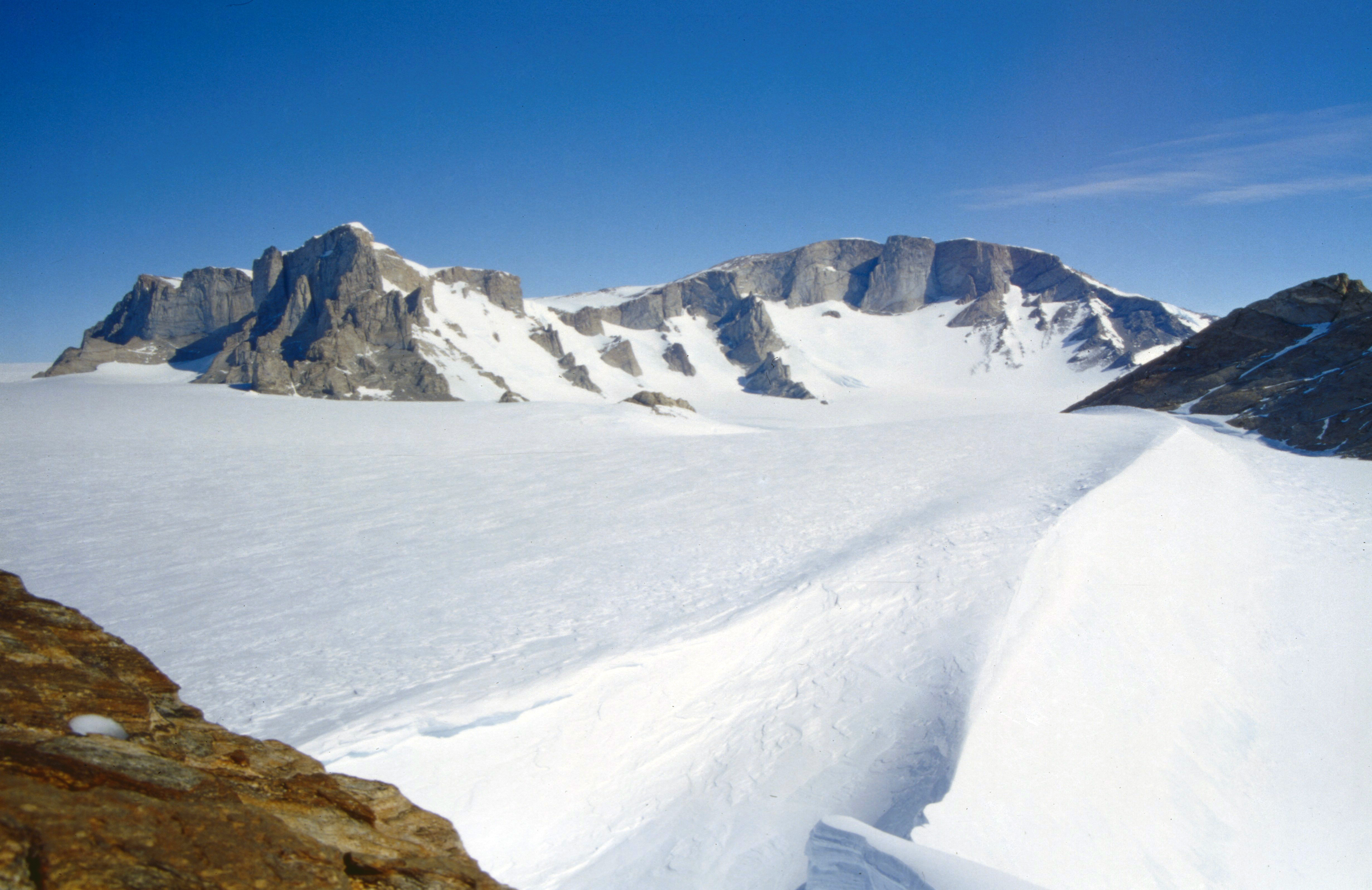
- Risemedet Mountain

Highest point
- Elevation: 2,705 metres (8,875 ft)
- Coordinates: 72°03′S 3°10′E

Geography
- Location within Antarctica
- Location: Antarctica

Risemedet Mountain is a large mountain that marks the eastern end of the Gjelsvik Mountains in Queen Maud Land. It was mapped by Norwegian cartographers from surveys and air photos by the Sixth Norwegian Antarctic Expedition (1956–60) and named Risemedet (the giant landmark).

The Medmulen Spurs extend from the north side of the mountain. Medhalsen Saddle is an ice saddle just south of Risemedet Mountain.

== See also ==
- List of mountains of Queen Maud Land
