= Von Essen Mountain =

Mountain in Queen Maud Land, Antarctica

Von Essen Mountain (72°14′S 2°23′E) is a mountain, 2,665 m, marking the southwestern end of the Gjelsvik Mountains in Queen Maud Land, Antarctica. Photographed from the air by the German Antarctic Expedition (1938–39). Mapped by Norwegian cartographers from surveys and air photos by Norwegian-British-Swedish Antarctic Expedition (NBSAE) (1949–52) and air photos by the Norwegian expedition (1958–59). Named for R.G.D.J. Von Essen, commander of the Swedish Air Force unit (1951–52) with the NBSAE.
