= Nupskammen Ridge =

Nupskammen Ridge (72°9′S 2°19′E) is a ridge of jagged peaks 8 nautical miles (15 km) long, standing north of Von Essen Mountain in the Gjelsvik Mountains, Queen Maud Land, Antarctica. Photographed from the air by the German Antarctic Expedition (1938–39). Mapped by Norwegian cartographers from surveys and air photos by Norwegian-British-Swedish Antarctic Expedition (NBSAE) (1949–52) and air photos by the Norwegian expedition (1958–59) and named Nupskammen (the peak crest).
