= Gjelsvik Mountains =

Group of mountains in Antarctica

- Gjelsvikfjella (Bokmål)
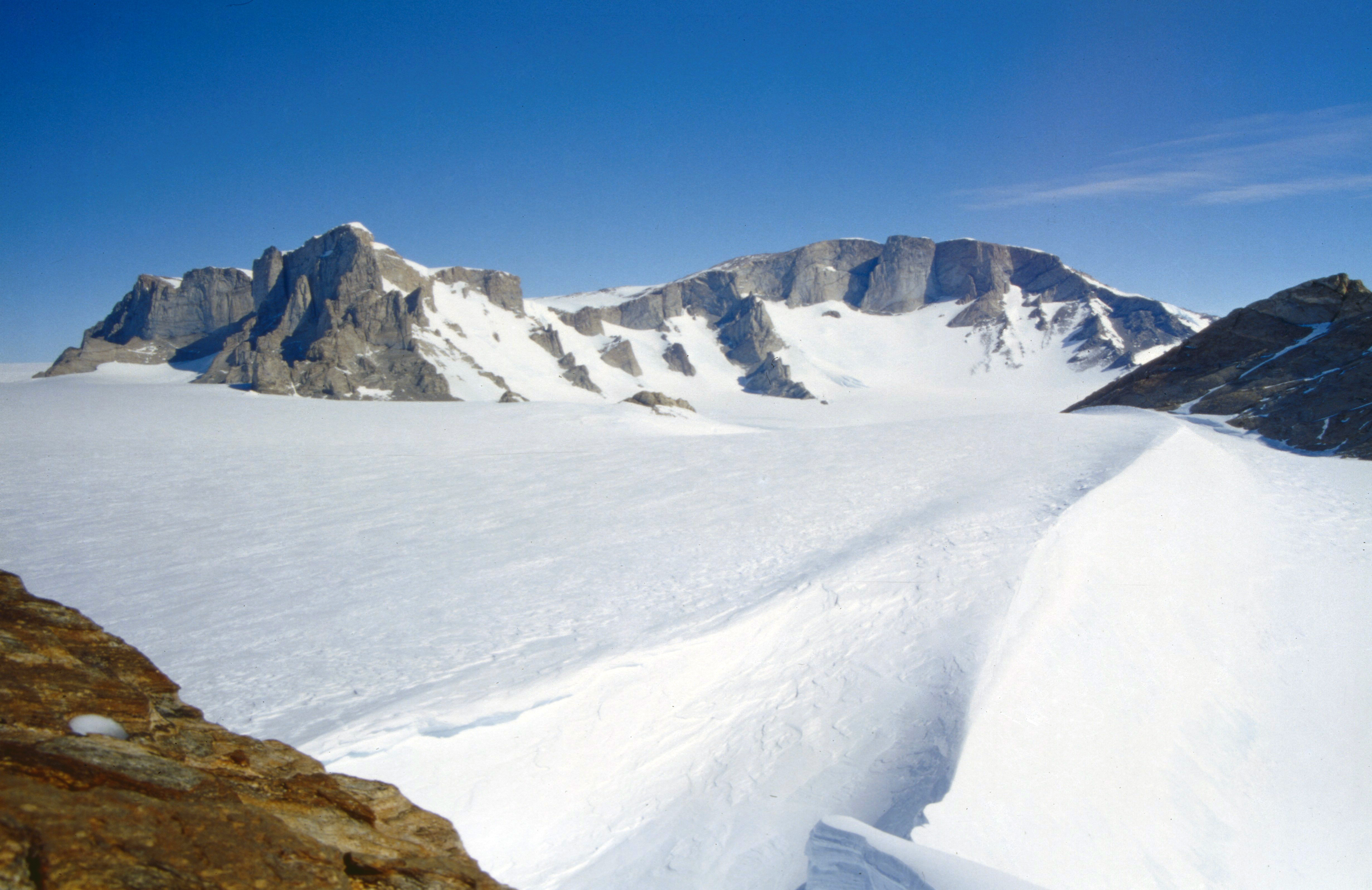

Highest point
- Peak: Risemedet Mountain
- Elevation: 8,875 ft (2,705 m)
- Coordinates: 72°9′S 2°36′E

Geography
- Location within Antarctica
- Continent: Antarctica
- Region(s): Queen Maud Land, East Antarctica
- Parent range: Fimbulheimen

The Gjelsvik Mountains are a group of mountains about 25 nautical miles (50 km) long, between the Sverdrup Mountains and the Mühlig-Hofmann Mountains in Queen Maud Land, East Antarctica. With its summit at 2,705 metres (8,875 ft), the massive Risemedet Mountain forms the highest point in these mountains, also marking their eastern end.

== Discovery and naming ==
The Gjelsvik Mountains were first photographed from the air and roughly plotted by the Third German Antarctic Expedition (1938–39). They were mapped in detail by Norwegian cartographers from surveys and air photos by the Norwegian–British–Swedish Antarctic Expedition (1949–52) and from air photos by the Norwegian expedition (1958–59). They were named for Tore Gjelsvik, Director of the Norwegian Polar Institute.

Map depicting the territorial extent of Queen Maud Land

== Features ==
- Bakhallet Slope
- Brugda Ridge
- Bundermann Range
- Jutulsessen
- Mayr Ridge
- Nupskammen Ridge
- Terningskarvet Mountain
- Von Essen Mountain

== See also ==
- Gygra Peak
- List of mountains of Queen Maud Land
