= Gavlpiggen Peak =

Mountain in Antarctica

Gavlpiggen Peak (73°58′S 5°47′W) is a low, isolated peak 2 nautical miles (4 km) southwest of Klakknabben Peak, just north of the Kirwan Escarpment in Queen Maud Land, Antarctica. It was mapped by Norwegian cartographers from surveys and air photos by the Norwegian–British–Swedish Antarctic Expedition (1949–52) and from additional air photos (1958–59), and named Gavlpiggen (the gable peak).
