= Klakknabben Peak =

Mountain in Queen Maud Land, Antarctica

Klakknabben Peak (73°57′S 5°42′W) is a low isolated peak 2 nautical miles (4 km) northeast of Gavlpiggen Peak, just north of the Kirwan Escarpment in Queen Maud Land, Antarctica. It was mapped by Norwegian cartographers from surveys and air photos by Norwegian–British–Swedish Antarctic Expedition (1949–52) and from additional air photos (1958–59), and named Klakknabben (the lump peak).
