= List of nunataks =

Specific form of polar glacial islands

Nunataks, also called glacial islands, are exposed portions of ridges, mountains, or peaks not covered with ice or snow within (or at the edge of) an ice field or glacier. Nunataks present readily identifiable landmark reference points in glaciers or ice caps and are often named. The term is derived from the Inuit word, nunataq.

== Antarctica ==
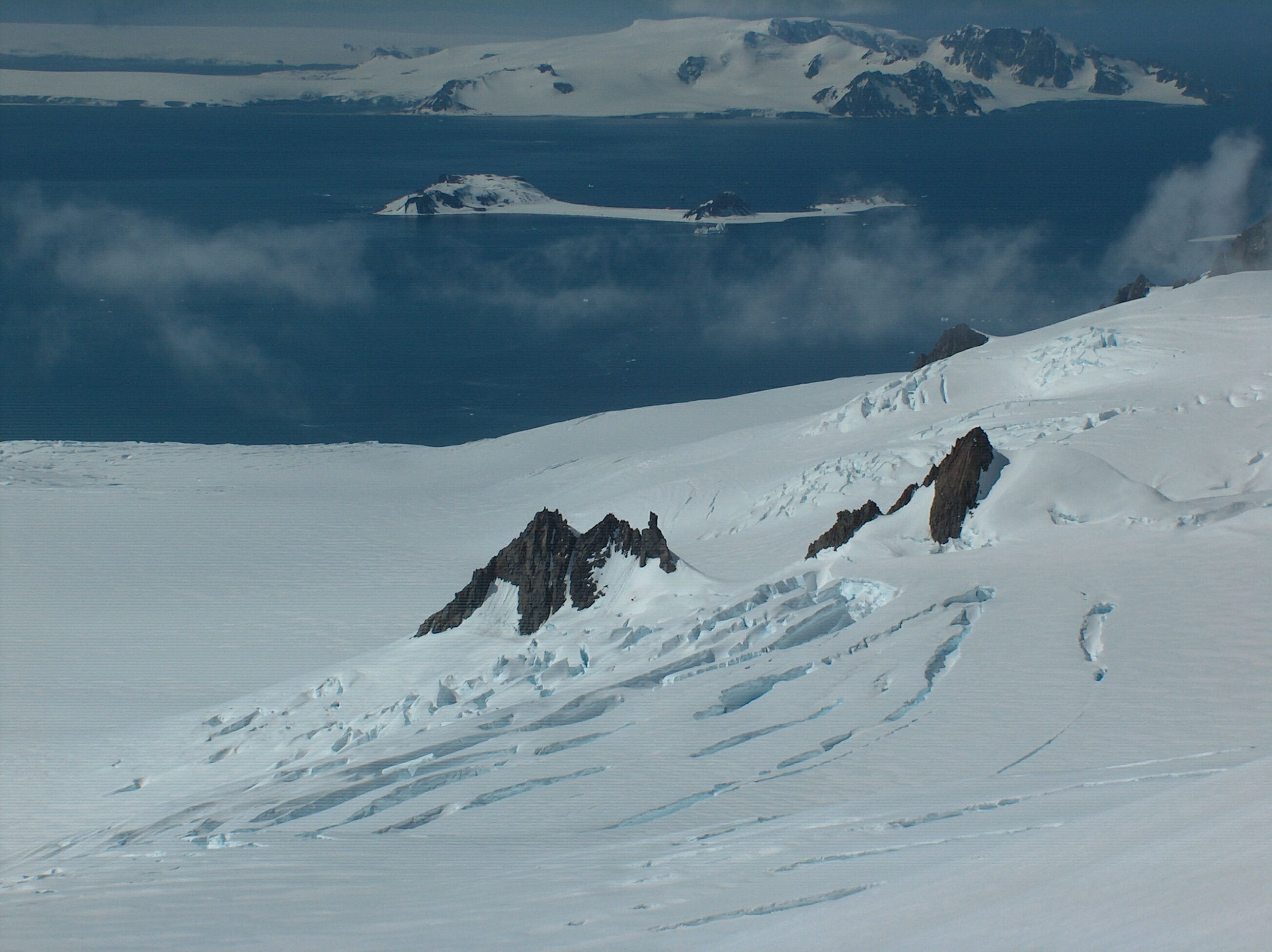
Nestinari Nunataks from Komini Peak, Livingston Island, Antarctica.

=== Enderby Land ===
- The Cook Nunataks (67°5′S 55°50′E) are a group of four nunataks at the northeast end of the Schwartz Range.

=== Graham Land ===
- Andersson Nunatak (63°22′S 57°0′W) is a nunatak 1 nautical mile (2 km) west of Sheppard Point, above the coastal ice cliffs on the north shore of Hope Bay. It was discovered by Johan Gunnar Andersson's party of the Swedish Antarctic Expedition which wintered at Hope Bay in 1903.
- Lincoln Nunatak (67°27′S 68°43′W) is a nunatak at the end of a ridge running westward from Mount Mangin on Adelaide Island.
- Skane Nunatak (64°43′02″S 64°16′36″W) is a 430-foot (130 m) high nunatak east of Cape Monaco on Anvers Island in the Palmer Archipelago.

=== Marie Byrd Land ===
- Bradley Nunatak (81°24′S 85°58′W) is a prominent nunatak standing 10 nautical miles (19 km) southwest of Mount Tidd in the Pirrit Hills.
- Knox Peak (84°49′S 116°39′W) is located between Vann Peak and Lackey Ridge at the west end of the Ohio Range.

=== Palmer Land ===
==== Aldebaran Rock ====
The Aldebaran Rock (70°50′S 66°41′W) is a particularly conspicuous nunatak of bright red rock, located near the head of Bertram Glacier and 5 miles (8 km) northeast of Pegasus Mountains in western Palmer Land.

==== Anckorn Nunataks ====
The Anckorn Nunataks (70°14′S 63°12′W) are a group of nunataks and snow-covered hills, 15 nautical miles (28 km) long, between Mount Bailey and Mount Samsel in the eastern part of Palmer Land.

==== Bergen Nunataks ====
The Bergen Nunataks (72°25′S 64°53′W) are a group of nunataks 14 nautical miles (26 km) north of the Journal Peaks in south-central Palmer Land. They were named in 1977 by the Advisory Committee on Antarctic Names after Michael Bergen, a United States Antarctic Research Program engineer at Palmer Station, winter party 1970.

==== Olander Nunatak ====
Olander Nunatak (74°25′S 72°7′W) is one of several somewhat scattered nunataks which rise above the ice of eastern Palmer Land, lying 5 nautical miles (9 km) east of Tollefson Nunatak and 27 nautical miles (50 km) north-northwest of Sky-Hi Nunataks.

=== Queen Maud Land ===
==== Bruns Nunataks ====
The Bruns Nunataks (72°5′S 1°10′E) are a small group of nunataks, lying 2.5 nautical miles (5 km) west-northwest of Brattskarvet Mountain in the Sverdrup Mountains of Queen Maud Land. The name "Bruns-Berge", after Herbert Bruns, electrical engineer with the expedition, was applied in this area by the Third German Antarctic Expedition (1938–39) under Alfred Ritscher.

- Tua Hill (72°5′S 1°12′E) is an isolated rock hill 3 nautical miles (6 km) west of Brattskarvet Mountain in the Sverdrup Mountains, Queen Maud Land. Photographed from the air by the German Antarctic Expedition (1938–39). Mapped by Norwegian cartographers from surveys and air photos by Norwegian-British-Swedish Antarctic Expedition (NBSAE) (1949–52) and air photos by the Norwegian expedition (1958–59) and named Tua (the knoll).

==== Charles Nunataks ====
The Charles Nunataks (73°19′S 2°10′E) are an isolated group of nunataks lying 8 nautical miles (15 km) south of the western end of the Neumayer Cliffs in Queen Maud Land. They were mapped by Norwegian cartographers from surveys and air photos by the Norwegian–British–Swedish Antarctic Expedition (NBSAE) (1949–52) and from air photos by the Norwegian expedition (1958–59), and named for Charles W. Swithinbank, glaciologist with NBSAE.

==== Dråpane Nunataks ====
The Dråpane Nunataks (73°46′S 5°3′E) are nunataks north of Urnosa Spur, near the southwest end of the Kirwan Escarpment in Queen Maud Land. They were mapped by Norwegian cartographers from surveys and air photos by the NBSAE and additional air photos (1958–59), and named Dråpane (the drops).

==== Firlingane Nunataks ====
The Firlingane Nunataks(71°52′S 27°7′E) are four nunataks standing between Bulken Hill and Hesteskoen Nunatak in the Sør Rondane Mountains of Antarctica. They were mapped by Norwegian cartographers in 1957 from air photos taken by U.S. Navy Operation Highjump, 1946–47, and named Firlingane (the quadruplets).

==== Hamarskaftet Nunataks ====
- The Hamarskaftet Nunataks (coordinates: 71°50′S 4°58′E) are a row of nunataks about 5 nautical miles (10 km) long, lying 2 nautical miles (4 km) northwest of Svarthamaren Mountain in the Mühlig-Hofmann Mountains of Queen Maud Land, Antarctica. They were mapped from surveys and air photos by the Sixth Norwegian Antarctic Expedition (1956–60) and named Hamarskaftet (the hammer handle).

==== Hemmestad Nunataks ====
The Hemmestad Nunataks (coordinates: 71°40′S 8°26′) are a group of about 20 nunataks extending over about 7 nautical miles (13 km), forming the northeast portion of the Drygalski Mountains in Queen Maud Land, Antarctica. They were plotted from air photos by the Third German Antarctic Expedition (1938–39), were mapped from surveys and air photos by the Sixth Norwegian Antarctic Expedition (1956–60) and named for Arne Hemmestad, a mechanic with the Norwegian expedition (1956–57).

- Arne Nunatak (coordinates: 71°43′S 8°20′E) is the largest of the Hemmestad Nunataks. It is also named for Arne Hemmestad.

==== Henriksen Nunataks ====
The Henriksen Nunataks (coordinates: 71°30′S 9°0′E) are a group of scattered nunataks about 10 nautical miles (20 km) north of the Kurze Mountains in Queen Maud Land, Antarctica. They were plotted from air photos by the Third German Antarctic Expedition (1938–39), mapped from surveys and air photos by the Sixth Norwegian Antarctic Expedition (1956–60) and named for Hans-Martin Henriksen, a meteorological assistant with the latter expedition (1956–58).

==== Hettene Nunataks ====
The Hettene Nunataks (coordinates: 71°45′S 26°25′E) are a group of nunataks at the west side of Hette Glacier in the Sør Rondane Mountains of Antarctica. They were mapped by Norwegian cartographers in 1957 from air photos taken by U.S. Navy Operation Highjump, 1946–47, and named Hettene (the caps).

==== Holane Nunataks ====
The Holane Nunataks (coordinates: 71°58′S 0°29′E) are two isolated nunataks lying about 20 nautical miles (40 km) west of the northern extremity of the Sverdrup Mountains, in Queen Maud Land, Antarctica. They were mapped and named by Norwegian cartographers from surveys and air photos by the Norwegian–British–Swedish Antarctic Expedition (1949–52) and from air photos by the Norwegian expedition (1958–59).

==== Isrosene Nunataks ====
The Isrosene Nunataks (coordinates: 71°53′S 26°35′E) are two nunataks 6 miles (10 km) west-northwest of Balchen Mountain, protruding through the western part of Byrdbreen in the Sør Rondane Mountains of Antarctica. They were mapped by Norwegian cartographers in 1957 from air photos taken by U.S. Navy Operation Highjump, 1946–47, and named "Isrosene" (the ice roses).

==== Jare IV Nunataks ====
The Jare IV Nunataks (coordinates: 71°38′S 36°0′E) are a group of four aligned nunataks situated 3 nautical miles (6 km) north-northeast of Mount Gaston de Gerlache in the Queen Fabiola Mountains of Antarctica. They were discovered on October 7, 1960, by the Belgian Antarctic Expedition under Guido Derom, and were named by Derom after the fourth Japanese Antarctic Research Expedition (JARE IV); in November–December 1960 a field party of the Japanese expedition reached this area and carried out geodetic and other scientific work.

==== Jarl Nunataks ====
The Jarl Nunataks (coordinates: 71°55′S 3°18′E) are a small group of nunataks 3 nautical miles (6 km) north of Risen Peak which mark the northeastern extremity of the Gjelsvik Mountains in Queen Maud Land, Antarctica. They were mapped from surveys and air photos by the Sixth Norwegian Antarctic Expedition (1956–60) and named for Jarl Tonnesen, a meteorologist with the expedition (1956–58).

==== Knattebrauta Nunataks ====
The Knattebrauta Nunataks (coordinates: 72°27′S 0°18′E) are a line of nunataks trending northeast–southwest lying 4 nautical miles (7 km) north of the Robin Heights in the Sverdrup Mountains, Queen Maud Land, Antarctica. They were photographed from the air by the Third German Antarctic Expedition (1938–39), mapped by Norwegian cartographers from surveys and air photos by the NBSAE and air photos by the Norwegian expedition (1958–59) and named Knattebrauta (the crag slope).

- Kvassknatten Nunatak (coordinates: 72°27′S 0°20′E) is one of the Knattebrauta Nunataks. It was photographed from the air by the Third German Antarctic Expedition (1938–39). It was mapped by Norwegian cartographers from surveys and air photos by the NBSAE and air photos by the Norwegian expedition (1958–59) and named Kvassknatten (the sharp crag).

==== Litvillingane Rocks ====
The Litvillingane Rocks (coordinates: 71°52′S 1°44′W) are two isolated nunataks, the eastern with a small outlier, lying 3 nautical miles (6 km) south of Bolten Peak, on the east side of Ahlmann Ridge in Queen Maud Land, Antarctica. They were mapped by Norwegian cartographers from surveys and air photos by the NBSAE and air photos by the Norwegian expedition (1958–59) and named Litvillingane (the mountainside twins).

==== Malyutki Nunataks ====
The Malyutki Nunataks (coordinates: 72°4′S 10°46′E) are a group of nunataks that trend north–south for 4 nautical miles (7 km), situated at the southeastern extremity of the Orvin Mountains, about 13 nautical miles (24 km) west-northwest of Skeidsberget Hill, in Queen Maud Land, Antarctica. The feature was mapped by the Norsk Polarinstitutt from surveys and air photos by the Sixth Norwegian Antarctic Expedition, 1956–60. It was also mapped by the Soviet Antarctic Expedition in 1961 and named "Skaly Malyutki" (baby nunataks).

==== Nevskiye Nunataks ====
Nevskiye Nunataks (coordinates: 71°40′S 8°5′E) are a group of scattered nunataks comprising the Sørensen Nunataks and Hemmestad Nunataks in the Drygalski Mountains, Queen Maud Land. Mapped by Norsk Polarinstitutt from surveys and air photos by Norwegian Antarctic Expedition, 1956–60. Also mapped by the Soviet Antarctic Expedition in 1961; the name is an adjective derived from Neva, a river in the Soviet Union.

==== Onezhskiye Nunataks ====
Onezhskiye Nunataks (coordinates: 71°35′S 7°3′E) is a small group of nunataks, situated 9 nautical miles (17 km) north-northeast of Slettefjellet in the Muhlig-Hofmann Mountains, Queen Maud Land. Mapped by Norsk Polarinstitutt from surveys and air photos by Norwegian Antarctic Expedition, 1956–60. Also mapped by Soviet Antarctic Expedition in 1961; the name is an adjective derived from Onega, a river in the Soviet Union.

- Storkvarvsteinen Peak (coordinates: 71°36′S 7°4′E) is an isolated rock peak 8 nautical miles (15 km) northeast of Storkvarvet Mountain and the main group of the Muhlig-Hofmann Mountains. Plotted from surveys and air photos by the Norwegian Antarctic Expedition (1956–60) and named Storkvarvsteinen (the big round of logs rock).

==== Perlebandet Nunataks ====
Perlebandet Nunataks (coordinates: 71°56′S 23°3′E) is a linear group of nunataks 5 nautical miles (9 km) northwest of Tanngarden Peaks in the Sor Rondane Mountains. It was mapped by Norwegian cartographers in 1957 from aerial photos taken by U.S. Navy Operation Highjump, 1946–47, and named Perlebandet (the string of beads).

==== Pingvinane Nunataks ====
Pingvinane Nunataks (coordinates: 72°0′S 23°17′E) are a group of nunataks standing close north of Tanngarden Peaks in the Sor Rondane Mountains. Mapped by Norwegian cartographers in 1957 from air photos taken by U.S. Navy Operation Highjump, 1946–47, and named Pingvinane (the penguins).

==== Plogskaftet Nunataks ====
Plogskaftet Nunataks (coordinates: 71°48′S 5°12′E) are a row of nunataks about 5 nautical miles (9 km) long lying close northwest of Cumulus Mountain in the Muhlig-Hofmann Mountains of Queen Maud Land. Mapped from surveys and air photos by the Norwegian Antarctic Expedition (1956–60) and named Plogskaftet (the plow handle).

==== Rimekalvane Nunataks ====
Rimekalvane Nunataks (coordinates: 72°3′S 13°38′E) is a group of nunataks 4 nautical miles (7 km) east of Dekefjellrantane Hills in the Weyprecht Mountains of Queen Maud Land. Photographed from the air by the German Antarctic Expedition (1938–39). Mapped by Norwegian cartographers from surveys and air photos by the Norwegian Antarctic Expedition (1956–60) and named Rimekalvane (the frost calves).

==== Ristkalvane Nunataks ====
Ristkalvane Nunataks (coordinates: 71°41′S 10°36′E) is a small group of nunataks forming the north end of Shcherbakov Range, in the Orvin Mountains of Queen Maud Land. Discovered and photographed by the German Antarctic Expedition, 1938–39. Mapped by Norway from air photos and surveys by Norwegian Antarctic Expedition, 1956–60, and named Ristkalvane (the ridge calves).

==== Rokhlin Nunataks ====
Rokhlin Nunataks (coordinates: 72°12′S 14°28′E) are four nunataks standing 6 nautical miles (11 km) south of Linnormen Hills at the south extremity of the Payer Mountains, in Queen Maud Land. Discovered and first plotted from air photos by German Antarctic Expedition, 1938–39. Mapped from air photos by Norwegian Antarctic Expedition, 1958–59; remapped by Soviet Antarctic Expedition, 1960–61, and named after M.I. Rokhlin, a wintering over geologist who died in 1958.

- Filsponen Nunatak (coordinates: 72°12′S 14°25′E) is a nunatak rising northeast of Steinfila Nunatak in the southern part of the Payer Mountains in Queen Maud Land, Antarctica. It was mapped by Norwegian cartographers from surveys and air photos by the Sixth Norwegian Antarctic Expedition (1956–60) and named Filsponen (the filings).
- Komandnaya Nunatak (coordinates: 72°12′S 14°31′E) is the eastern and highest of the Rokhlin Nunataks, located in the southern part of the Payer Mountains in Queen Maud Land, Antarctica. It was discovered and plotted from air photos by the Third German Antarctic Expedition, 1938–39. The nunatak was mapped from air photos and surveys collected by the Soviet Antarctic Expedition, 1960–61 and named Gora Komandnaya (Russian for "command mountain").
- Skruvestikka Nunatak (coordinates: 72°11′S 14°27′E) is a nunatak just eastward of Filsponen Nunatak at the south end of the Payer Mountains, in Queen Maud Land. Mapped by Norwegian cartographers from air photos taken by the Norwegian Antarctic Expedition (1956–60) and named Skruvestikka (the screwdriver).
- Steinfila Nunatak (coordinates: 72°12′S 14°23′E) is the westernmost of Rokhlin Nunataks which mark the southwest extremity of the Payer Mountains in Queen Maud Land. Mapped by Norwegian cartographers from surveys and air photos by the Norwegian Antarctic Expedition (1956–60) and named Steinfila (the stone file).

==== Sandhøkalvane Nunataks ====
Sandhøkalvane Nunataks (coordinates: 71°46′S 9°55′E) are a group of nunataks located 4 nautical miles (7.4 km) northeast of Sandhø Heights, lying between the Conrad Mountains and Mount Dallmann in Queen Maud Land. They were discovered and photographed by the German Antarctic Expedition in 1938–39, and mapped by Norway from air photos and surveys by the Norwegian Antarctic Expedition, 1956–60, and named Sandhøkalvane ("the sand heights calves").

==== Single nunataks ====
- Båken Nunatak (coordinates: 71°18′S 2°57′W) is a small, isolated nunatak surmounting the north part of Bakeneset Headland in Queen Maud Land. It was mapped by Norwegian cartographers from surveys and from air photos by the Norwegian-British-Swedish Antarctic Expedition (1949–52) (NBSAE), and from air photos by the Norwegian expedition (1958–59), and named "Båken" (the "beacon").
- Boreas Nunatak (coordinates: 71°18′S 3°57′W) is a 220-metre-high (720 ft) nunatak, nearly 1 mile (1.6 km) southwest of Passat Nunatak at the mouth of Schytt Glacier in Queen Maud Land. It was discovered by the Third German Antarctic Expedition (1938–1939), led by Capt. Alfred Ritscher, and named after Boreas, one of the Dornier flying boats of the expedition. The feature was surveyed by the NBSAE, led by John Schjelderup Giæver.
- Chernushka Nunatak (coordinates: 71°35′S 12°1′E) is a nunatak, 1,640 metres (5,380 ft) high, lying 2 nautical miles (4 km) southwest of Sandseten Mountain on the west side of the Westliche Petermann Range in the Wohlthat Mountains. It was discovered and plotted from air photos by the Third German Antarctic Expedition, 1938–39. It was mapped from air photos and surveys by the Sixth Norwegian Antarctic Expedition, 1956–60, and remapped by the Soviet Antarctic Expedition, 1960–61. It was named by the USSR as a token of the Soviet scientists' achievements in the study of space, by commemorating Chernushka, a dog that was sent into space and safely returned to earth.
- Dalten Nunatak (coordinates: 72°23′S 3°42′W) is a nunatak about 1.5 nautical miles (3 km) east-southeast of Dilten Nunatak and 7 nautical miles (13 km) northwest of Borg Mountain in Queen Maud Land. It was mapped by Norwegian cartographers from surveys and air photos by the NBSAE.
- Dilten Nunatak (coordinates: 72°22′S 3°47′W) is a nunatak about 1.5 nautical miles (3 km) west-northwest of Dalten Nunatak and 8 miles (13 km) northwest of Borg Mountain in Queen Maud Land. It was mapped by Norwegian cartographers from surveys and air photos by the NBSAE and named Dilten.
- Drabanten Nunatak (coordinates: 73°54′S 5°55′W) is a nunatak about 10 nautical miles (20 km) west of Tunga Spur, just north of the Kirwan Escarpment in Queen Maud Land. It was mapped by Norwegian cartographers from surveys and air photos by the NBSAE and additional air photos (1958–59), and named Drabanten (the satellite).
- Ekspress Nunatak (coordinates: 71°48′S 2°53′E) is a nunatak 10 nautical miles (19 km) north of Stabben Mountain in Queen Maud Land. It was mapped by the Norsk Polarinstitutt from air photography of 1951–52 and 1958–59. It was also mapped by the Soviet Antarctic Expedition in 1961 and named "Gora Ekspress" (express hill).
- Eremitten Nunatak (coordinates: 72°11′S 27°13′E) is a nunatak 3 nautical miles (6 km) south of Balchen Mountain in the Sør Rondane Mountains of Antarctica. It was mapped by Norwegian cartographers in 1957 from air photos taken by U.S. Navy Operation Highjump, 1946–47, and named "Eremitten" (the hermit).
- Fjomet Nunatak (coordinates: 73°25′S 2°55′W) is an isolated nunatak about 8 nautical miles (15 km) east-southeast of Mount Hallgren, along the Kirwan Escarpment of Queen Maud Land, Antarctica. It was mapped by Norwegian cartographers from surveys and air photos by the NBSAE and from air photos by the Norwegian expedition (1958–59) and named Fjomet.
- Fløymannen Nunatak (coordinates: 73°9′S 2°14′W) is a nunatak just north of the west end of the Neumayer Cliffs in Queen Maud Land, Antarctica. It was mapped by Norwegian cartographers from surveys and air photos by NBSAE and from air photos by the Norwegian expedition (1958–59) and named Fløymannen (the wing man).
- Fokknuten Nunatak (coordinates: 71°56′S 23°15′E) is a small nunatak standing 4 nautical miles (7 km) east of the Perlebandet Nunataks in the Sør Rondane Mountains of Antarctica. It was mapped by Norwegian cartographers in 1957 from air photos taken by U.S. Navy Operation Highjump, 1946–47, and named Fokknuten (the spray peak).
- Førstefjell (coordinates: 71°50′S 5°43′W) is a nunatak about 5 nautical miles (10 km) north of Førstefjellsrabben, in the northwest part of Giaever Ridge in Queen Maud Land, Antarctica. It was mapped by Norwegian cartographers from surveys and air photos by the NBSAE and named Førstefjell (first mountain).
- Førstefjellsrabben (coordinates: 71°55′S 5°49′W) is a nunatak about 5 nautical miles (10 km) south of Førstefjell, in the northwest part of Giaever Ridge in Queen Maud Land, Antarctica. It was mapped by Norwegian cartographers from surveys and air photos by the NBSAE, and named Førstefjellsrabben (Førstefjell hill) in association with Førstefjell.
- Framrabben Nunatak (coordinates: 72°29′S 3°52′W) is a nunatak about 3 nautical miles (6 km) west-northwest of Borg Mountain in Queen Maud Land, Antarctica. It was mapped by Norwegian cartographers from surveys and air photos by the NBSAE and named Framrabben (the forward nunatak).
- Galyshev Nunatak (coordinates: 71°36′S 12°28′E) is a nunatak at the southwest foot of Store Svarthorn Peak in the Mittlere Petermann Range of the Wohlthat Mountains, Antarctica. It was discovered and plotted from air photos by the Third German Antarctic Expedition, 1938–39. It was mapped from air photos and surveys by the Sixth Norwegian Antarctic Expedition, 1956–60; remapped by the Soviet Antarctic Expedition, 1960–61, and named after Soviet pilot V.L. Galyshev.
- Gårenevkalven Nunatak (coordinates: 72°0′S 14°47′E) is a nunatak, 2,250 metres (7,380 ft) high, located 3 nautical miles (6 km) north of Gårekneet Ridge in the eastern part of the Payer Mountains, in Queen Maud Land, Antarctica. It was mapped and named by Norwegian cartographers from air photos taken by the Sixth Norwegian Antarctic Expedition, 1956–60.
- Glopenesranen Nunatak (coordinates: 72°8′S 10°1′E) is a nunatak surmounting the north end of Glopeneset at the south side of Glopeflya Plain in Queen Maud Land, Antarctica. It was photographed from the air by the Third German Antarctic Expedition (1938–39). It was mapped by Norwegian cartographers from surveys and air photos by the Sixth Norwegian Antarctic Expedition (1956–60) and named Glopenesranen (the ravine promontory point).
- Gløymdehorten Nunatak (coordinates: 72°7′S 12°11′E) is a nunatak on the west side of Horteriset Dome, just west of the Weyprecht Mountains in Queen Maud Land, Antarctica. It was photographed from the air by the Third German Antarctic Expedition (1938–39). It was mapped by Norwegian cartographers from surveys and air photos by the Sixth Norwegian Antarctic Expedition (1956–60) and named Gløymdehorten.
- Gråsteinen Nunatak (coordinates: 71°57′S 2°0′W) is a nunatak 7 nautical miles (13 km) southwest of the Litvillingane Rocks, on the east side of Ahlmann Ridge in Queen Maud Land, Antarctica. It was mapped by Norwegian cartographers from surveys and air photos by the NBSAE and from air photos by the Norwegian expedition (1958–59) and named Gråsteinen (the gray stone).
- Hans-Martin Nunatak (coordinates: 71°37′S 8°56′E) is a nunatak about 3 nautical miles (6 km) south of the Henriksen Nunataks in Queen Maud Land, Antarctica. It was mapped from surveys and air photos by the Sixth Norwegian Antarctic Expedition (1956–60) and named for Hans-Martin Henriksen, a meteorological assistant with the expedition (1956–58).
- Hesteskoen Nunatak (coordinates: 71°52′S 27°15′E) is a horseshoe-shaped nunatak, 2,350 metres (7,700 ft) high, standing 4 nautical miles (7 km) north of Balchen Mountain in the Sør Rondane Mountains of Antarctica. It was mapped by Norwegian cartographers in 1946 from air photos taken by the Lars Christensen Expedition, 1936–37, and in 1957 from air photos taken by U.S. Navy Operation Highjump, 1946–47; it was named Hesteskoen (the horseshoe) by the Norwegians.
- Kista Nunatak (coordinates: 69°47′S 37°17′E) is a nunatak 0.5 nautical miles (1 km) south of Såta Nunatak, standing at the east side of Fletta Bay along the southwest coast of Lützow-Holm Bay, Antarctica. It was mapped by Norwegian cartographers from air photos taken by the Lars Christensen Expedition, 1936–37, and named Kista (the chest).
- Knotten Nunatak (coordinates: 71°37′S 2°19′W) is a nunatak 5 nautical miles (9 km) southwest of Krylen Hill, in the northern part of Ahlmann Ridge in Queen Maud Land, Antarctica. It was mapped by Norwegian cartographers from surveys and air photos by the Norwegian–British–Swedish Antarctic Expedition (1949–52) and air photos by the Norwegian expedition (1958–59) and named Knotten (the knob).
- Lars Nunatak (coordinates: 71°52′S 4°13′E) is a nunatak about 5 nautical miles (9 km) west of Skigarden Ridge in the Mühlig-Hofmann Mountains of Queen Maud Land, Antarctica. It was mapped from surveys and air photos by the Sixth Norwegian Antarctic Expedition (1956–60) and named for Lars Hochlin, a dog driver and radio operator with the expedition (1956–58).
- Marsteinen Nunatak (coordinates: 71°26′S 1°42′W) is a coastal nunatak 6 nautical miles (11 km) northeast of Valken Hill, at the north end of Ahlmann Ridge in Queen Maud Land, Antarctica. It was mapped by Norwegian cartographers from surveys and air photos by the Norwegian–British–Swedish Antarctic Expedition (1949–52) and from air photos by the Norwegian expedition (1958–59) and named Marsteinen (the sea stone).
- Muller Crest (coordinates: 72°11′S 8°8′E) is a short ridgelike nunatak (2,620 m) marking the southeast extremity of the Filchner Mountains in the Orvin Mountains of Queen Maud Land. Discovered by the German Antarctic Expedition under Ritscher, 1938–39, and named after Johannes Muller, navigation officer of the Deutschland, the ship of the German Antarctic Expedition under Filchner, 1911–12. Remapped from air photos and survey by Norwegian Antarctic Expedition, 1956–60.
- Nordtoppen Nunatak (coordinates: 71°29′S 25°14′E) is a nunatak, 1,100 m, standing 16 nautical miles (30 km) north of the Austkampane Hills of the Sor Rondane Mountains. Mapped by Norwegian cartographers in 1946 from air photos taken by the Lars Christensen Expedition, 1936–37, and in 1957 from air photos taken by U.S. Navy Operation Highjump, 1946–47. Named Nordtoppen (the north peak) by the Norwegians because of its position in the group.
- Odde Nunatak (coordinates: 72°2′S 10°42′E) is a nunatak on the east side of Glopeflya Plain near the Orvin Mountains. It is the northernmost of a small chain of nunataks, and was mapped by Norwegian cartographers from surveys and air photos during the Norwegian Antarctic Expedition (1956–60), It was named for Odde Gjeruldsen, who was a scientific assistant with the expedition.
- Odinokaya Nunatak (coordinates: 71°32′S 6°10′E) is a small, isolated nunatak about 15 nautical miles (28 km) northwest of the Jaren Crags, Muhlig-Hofmann Mountains, in Queen Maud Land. Mapped by Norsk Polarinstitutt from surveys and air photos by Norwegian Antarctic Expedition, 1956–60. Also mapped by the Soviet Antarctic Expedition in 1961 and named Gora Odinokaya (solitary hill).
- Okskaya Nunatak (coordinates: 71°58′S 13°47′E) is an elongated nunatak, 2,295 m, at the north end of Rimekalvane Nunataks in the Weyprecht Mountains, Queen Maud Land. It was discovered and plotted from air photos by German Antarctic Expedition (1938–39). mapped from air photos and surveys by Norwegian Antarctic Expedition (1956–60), remapped by Soviet Antarctic Expedition (1960–61) and named presumedly after the river Oka.
- Passat Nunatak (coordinates: 71°18′S 3°55′W) is a nunatak (145 m) nearly 1 nautical mile (1.9 km) northeast of Boreas Nunatak at the mouth of Schytt Glacier in Queen Maud Land. Discovered by the German Antarctic Expedition under Ritscher, 1938–39, and named after Passat, one of the Dornier flying boats of the expedition.
- Per Nunatak (coordinates: 71°52′S 7°4′E) is a nunatak lying 4 nautical miles (7 km) northeast of Larsen Cliffs in the Muhlig-Hofmann Mountains, Queen Maud Land. Plotted from surveys and air photos by the Norwegian Antarctic Expedition (1956–60) and named for Per Larsen, steward with Norwegian Antarctic Expedition (1956–57).
- Pilten Nunatak (71°53′S 24°48′E) is a nunatak in the north part of Gjel Glacier in the Sor Rondane Mountains. Mapped by Norwegian cartographers in 1957 from air photos taken by U.S. Navy Operation Highjump, 1946–47, and named Pilten (the nipper).
- Pyramiden Nunatak (72°17′S 3°48′W) is a nunatak two nautical miles (3.7 km) east of Knallen Peak, on the east side of the head of Schytt Glacier in Queen Maud Land. Mapped by Norwegian cartographers from surveys and air photos by Norwegian-British-Swedish Antarctic Expedition (NBSAE) (1949–52) and named Pyramiden (the pyramid).
- Samoylovich Nunatak (71°48′S 4°55′E) is a nunatak near the north end of the Hamarskaftet Nunataks, in the Muhlig-Hofmann Mountains, Queen Maud Land. Mapped by Norsk Polarinstitutt from surveys and air photos by Norwegian Antarctic Expedition, 1956–60. Also mapped by Soviet Antarctic Expedition in 1961 and named for Rudolf Samoylovich, a polar explorer.
- Sandneskalven Nunatak (71°40′S 9°53′E) is a nunatak located 6 nautical miles (11 km) east of Sandneset Point in the Conrad Mountains in Queen Maud Land. Mapped by Norway from air photos and surveys by Norwegian Antarctic Expedition, 1956–60, and named Sandneskalven (the sand point calf).
- Såta Nunatak (69°46′S 37°17′E) is a nunatak, 0.5 nautical miles (0.93 km) north of Kista Nunatak, standing at the east side of Fletta Bay along the southwest shore of Lützow-Holm Bay. It was mapped by Norwegian cartographers from air photos taken by the Lars Christensen Expedition, 1936–37, and named Såta ("the haystack").
- Sfinksen Nunatak (72°18′S 3°47′W) is a nunatak about 1 mile (1.6 km) south of Pyramiden Nunatak, at the southwest end of Ahlmann Ridge in Queen Maud Land. Mapped by Norwegian cartographers from surveys and air photos by the Norwegian-British-Swedish Antarctic Expedition (NBSAE) (1949–1952), led by John Schjelderup Giæver and named Sfinksen (the sphinx).
- Tommeliten Rock (71°47′S 2°29′W) is a nunatak six nautical miles (11 km) east of Lorentzen Peak on the Ahlmann Ridge in Queen Maud Land, Antarctica. It was mapped by Norwegian cartographers from surveys and air photos by NBSAE and air photos by the Norwegian expedition (1958–59) and named Tommeliten (Tom Thumb).
- Veslestabben Nunatak (69°42′S 37°35′E) is an isolated nunatak standing in the central part of Botnneset Peninsula on the south side of Lutzow-Holm Bay. It was mapped by Norwegian cartographers from air photos taken by the Lars Christensen Expedition, 1936–37, and named Veslestabben, meaning "the little stump."

=== Victoria Land ===
==== Individual nunataks ====
- Carapace Nunatak (76°53′S 159°24′E) is a prominent isolated nunatak, the most westerly near the head of Mackay Glacier in Victoria Land, standing 8 nautical miles (15 km) southwest of Mount Brooke where it is visible for a considerable distance from many directions.
- Cat Nunatak (77°29′S 163°29′E) is midway between Vince Nunatak and Hogback Hill in the southern part of Wilson Piedmont Glacier.
- Low Nunatak (77°04′25″S 161°57′00″E) is a nunatak in the Cotton Glacier, 2 nautical miles (3.7 km) north of the western end of Killer Ridge, in the Gonville and Caius Range of Victoria Land. About 1 nautical mile (1.9 km) long, the nunatak rises 50 metres (160 ft) above the surrounding ice surface to about 450 metres (1,480 ft) above sea level. The descriptive name appears on the map of the British Antarctic Expedition of 1910–1913.
- Icefall Nunatak (72°28′S 166°8′E) is a nunatak 1 mile (1.6 km) north of Mount Watt in the Barker Range of Victoria Land, Antarctica. The nunatak was visited in 1981–82 by Bradley Field, a geologist with the New Zealand Geological Survey, who suggested the name from the impressive icefalls that drop off at either side of the feature.
- Vince Nunatak (77°30′S 163°22′E) is near Cat Nunatak in the southern part of Wilson Piedmont Glacier.

== Europe ==
=== Ireland ===
- Benbulbin

=== Norway ===
- Lodalskåpa

=== Russia ===
- Gora Severny Nunatak

=== Scotland ===
The following mountains formed as nunataks during the last ice age:

- Canisp
- Suilven
- Stac Pollaidh

== North America ==
=== Greenland ===
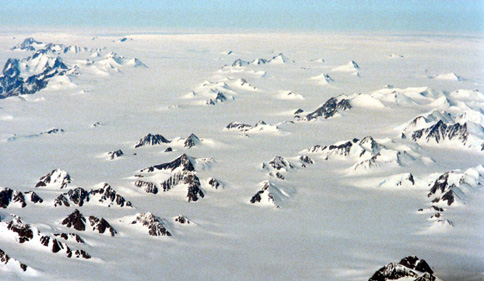
Nunataks in eastern Greenland

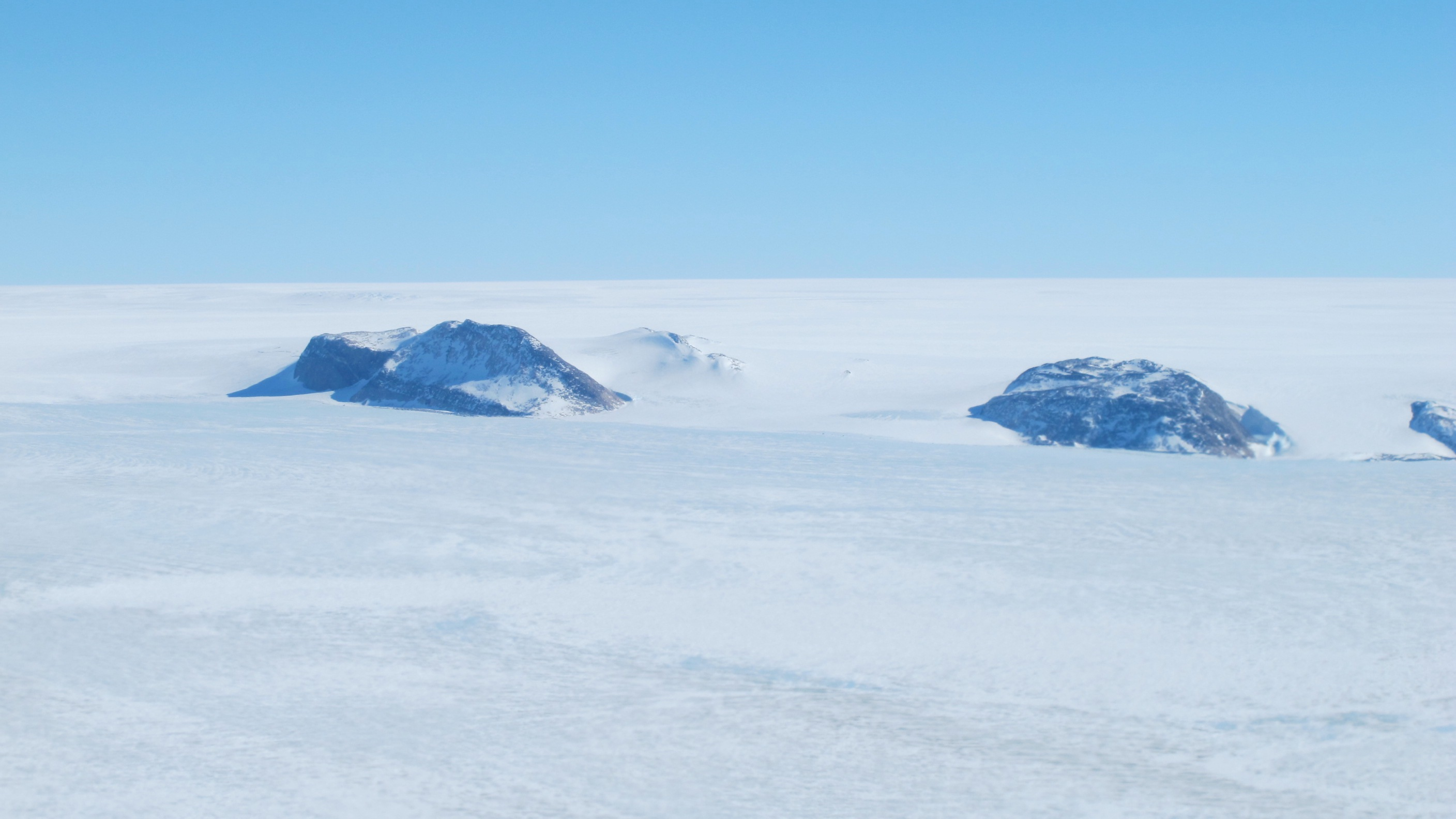
Nunataks in western Greenland

- Alabama Nunatak
- Alfabet Nunatak
- Alfheimbjerg
- Anders Jahre Nunatak
- Anoritooq
- Arnold Escher Land
- Bartholin Nunatak
- Bernhard Studer Land
- Beta Nunatak
- Bildsøe Nunataks
- Borgtinderne
- Brages Range
- Brune Nunataks
- C. H. Ostenfeld Nunatak
- Cecilia Nunatak
- Crown Prince Frederick Range
  - Panorama Nunatak
  - Redekammen
- Dødemandstoppene
- Ejnar Mikkelsen Range
- Faraway How
- Frederiksborg Nunataks
- Garde Nunataks
  - Grønne Nunatak
  - Tuborgfondet Land
- Gaule Bjerg
- Graah Mountains
- Grabenland
- Gronau Nunataks
- Häsi Range (Häsi Bjerge)
- Helgoland
- Hobbs Land
- Holger Kiaer Nunataks
- Hvidbjørn Nunataks
- J. A. D. Jensen Nunataks
- J. L. Mowinckel Land
- Jakob Kjøde Bjerg
- Jomfruen
- Kangerluluk Range
- Near Kangerlussuaq Fjord, East Greenland
  - Kangerlussuaq Tinde
  - Trekant Nunataks
- Knud Ringnes Nunatak
- Ledesia Bjerg
- Lille Renland
- Lindbergh Range
- Martin Knudsen Nunataks
- Moltke Nunataks
- Nansen Nunataks
- Nils Holgersen Nunataks
- Nunatakassak
- Nunatarsuaq
- Nunatarsuaq (Tasiusaq Bay)
- In Odinland
  - Alukajik
  - Ensom Majestaet
  - Ensomme Skraent
  - Eqaluttusoq
  - Hammerfaldet
  - Hustoppen
  - Ørnen
  - Pelikanen
  - Spidstoppen
  - Tommeltotten
  - Trillingerne
  - Tyrs Bjerge
- Orsugissap Qaqqarsua
- Paatusoq
- Pattefjeldene
- Paul Stern Land
- Peary Nunatak
- Petermann Peak
- Pic de Gerlache
- Porsild Nunatak
- Poulsen Nunataks
- Prøvestenen
- Pyramiden
- Queen Louise Land
  - Carlsbergfondet Land
  - Eventyrfjelde
  - Falkonerklippe
  - Farvel Nunatak
  - Glückstadt Nunatak
  - Henius Nunatak
  - Juel-Brockdorff Nunatak
  - Kaldbakur
  - Laub Nunataks
  - Lembcke Bjerg
  - Olsen Nunataks
  - Paletten
  - Poulsen Nunataks
  - Prince Axel Nunataks
  - Prøvestenen
  - Punktum
  - Revaltoppe
  - Savryggen
  - Suzanne Nunatak
  - Syvstjernen
  - Trekanten
  - Ymer Nunatak
- Rigi Nunatak
- Royston Nunataks
- Shackleton Bjerg
- Skaermen
- Skirnir Mountains
- In Skoldungen Island
  - Gedebukken
  - Pandebrasken
  - Skuren
  - Sfinksen
- Skraenterne
- Slottet
- Sortehest
- Tavlen
- In Thorland
  - Akuliaruseq
  - Ansbjerg
  - Diabastoppen
  - Skønheden
  - Strudsen
- Thrymheim
- Tillit Nunatak
- Tuttulikassak
- Varde Nunatak
- Vindhjørne
- Vindue Nunatak
- Wager Nunataks
- Waltershausen Nunatak
- Wandel Land
- Watkins Range
- Westfal-Larsen Nunatak
- Wiedemann Range
- Wilkins Nunataks

=== United States ===
- Klawatti Peak (Washington)
- Packsaddle Island (Alaska)
- Pasayten Peak (Washington)

== See also ==
- Lists of islands
