= Axtell =

Axtell may refer to:

== People ==
- Axtell (surname)

== Places ==
=== Antarctica ===
- Mount Axtell

=== United States ===
- Axtell, Kansas
- Axtell, Missouri
- Axtell, Nebraska
- Axtell, Texas
- Axtell, Utah
- Axtell, Virginia

== Other uses ==
- Axtell (horse) (1886–1906), American trotting horse

== See also ==
- Axtell High School (disambiguation)
