= Giaever =

Giaever may refer to:

- Ivar Giaever (1929–2025), Norwegian-American physicist, Nobel laureate in physics
- Giaever Glacier in Antarctica
- Giaever Ridge in Antarctica
- Giæver, a Norwegian surname
