= Krylvika Bight =

Bay in Antarctica

Coordinates: 71°20′S 2°0′W

Krylvika Bight is a southern lobe of the Fimbul Ice Shelf, indenting the coast of Queen Maud Land, Antarctica, for about 30 nautical miles (60 km) between Båkeneset Headland and Trollkjelneset Headland. It was mapped by Norwegian cartographers from surveys and air photos by the Norwegian–British–Swedish Antarctic Expedition (1949–52) and air photos by the Norwegian expedition (1958–59) and named Krylvika (the hump bay), probably in association with nearby Krylen Hill.
