= Giæver =

Giæver (IPA: [ˈjeːvər]) is a Norwegian surname that may refer to

- Anders Giæver (born 1961), Norwegian journalist and author
- Ivar Giaever (1929–2025), Norwegian-American physicist
- Jo Giæver Tenfjord (1918–2007), Norwegian librarian, children's writer and translator
- Joachim Giæver (1856–1925), Norwegian-born American civil engineer
- John Schjelderup Giæver (1901–1970), Norwegian author and polar researcher
  - Giaever Glacier in Antarctica
  - Giaever Ridge in Antarctica
- Knut T. Giæver (1926–2015), Norwegian publisher
- Morten Giæver (born 1982), Norwegian football midfielder
- Ola Krogseng Giæver (1885–1945), Norwegian farmer and politician
- Ole Giæver (born 1977), Norwegian film director, screenwriter and actor
- Torbjørn Giæver Eriksen (born 1970), Norwegian politician
