= Mount Hoffman =

Mountain in Ellsworth Land, Antarctica

Mount Hoffman (81°19′S 85°15′W) is a distinctive rock peak 1.5 nautical miles (3 km) south-southwest of Mount Tidd, in the southern flank of the Pirrit Hills of Antarctica. The peak was positioned by the U.S. Ellsworth–Byrd Traverse Party on December 7, 1958, and was named for Daniel Hoffman, a mechanic with the traverse party.

== See also ==
- Mountains in Antarctica
