= Bradley Nunatak =

Bradley Nunatak (81°24′S 85°58′W) is a prominent nunatak standing 10 nautical miles (19 km) southwest of Mount Tidd in the Pirrit Hills, Marie Byrd Land. The peak was positioned by the U.S. Ellsworth-Byrd Traverse Party on December 7, 1958, and named for Rev. Edward A. Bradley, S.J., seismologist with the party.
