= Knallen Peak =

Rock peak in Queen Maud Land, Antarctica

Knallen Peak (72°16′S 3°56′W) is a small rock peak 2 nautical miles (4 km) west of Pyramiden Nunatak, at the east side of the head of Schytt Glacier in Queen Maud Land, Antarctica. It was mapped by Norwegian cartographers from surveys and air photos by the Norwegian–British–Swedish Antarctic Expedition (1949–52) and named Knallen.
