= Reggie McGowan =

American football player (1964–2015)

No. 18
- Position: Wide receiver

Personal information
- Born: September 25, 1964; McLennan County, Texas, U.S.
- Died: August 26, 2015 (aged 50); Dallas, Texas, U.S.
- Listed height: 5 ft 8 in (1.73 m)
- Listed weight: 165 lb (75 kg)

Career information
- High school: Axtell
- College: Abilene Christian
- NFL draft: 1987: undrafted

Career history
- New York Giants (1987)
- Stats at Pro Football Reference

Reginald McGowan (September 25, 1964 – August 26, 2015) was an American football wide receiver who played for the New York Giants of the National Football League (NFL). He played college football at Abilene Christian University.

Born in Waco, Texas, McGowan attended Axtell High School and was a three-sport athlete (football, basketball, track), being an All-District and All-Region selection in football. He also earned selection to the Super Cen-Tex team and was chosen as the Class 2A Player of the Year. McGowan played college football at Ranger Junior College for two years before transferring to the Abilene Christian Wildcats.

McGowan set a single-game Lone Star Conference (LSC) receiving yards record in 1985. He was the league's overall receiving leader that year and was named second-team all-conference and honorable mention All-American. He also set a school record for single-game touchdowns that stood for 20 years. McGowan later played for the New York Giants as a replacement player in 1987, catching a 63-yard touchdown on Monday Night Football.

After his football career, McGowan worked for the KWTX television station. He died at age 50 in 2015.
