= Hortebrekka Slope =

Ice slope in Queen Maud Land, Antarctica

Hortebrekka Slope (72°7′S 12°34′E) is a crevassed ice slope which marks the eastern edge of Horteriset Dome, just west of the Weyprecht Mountains in Queen Maud Land, Antarctica. It was photographed from the air by the Third German Antarctic Expedition (1938–39), and was mapped and named by Norwegian cartographers from surveys and air photos by the Sixth Norwegian Antarctic Expedition (1956–60).
