= Valter Butte =

Mountain in Antarctica

Valter Butte (71°54′S 3°14′W) is an ice-free butte on the east side of Schytt Glacier, about 5 nautical miles (9 km) west-northwest of Mount Schumacher in Queen Maud Land. It was mapped by Norwegian cartographers from surveys and air photos by the Norwegian-British-Swedish Antarctic Expedition (NBSAE) (1949–52) and named for Stig Valter Schytt, second in command and glaciologist with the expedition.
