= Van Hughes =

American football player (born 1960)

No. 90, 78, 75
- Position: Defensive end

Personal information
- Born: November 14, 1960 (age 65); Waco, Texas, U.S.
- Listed height: 6 ft 3 in (1.91 m)
- Listed weight: 280 lb (127 kg)

Career information
- High school: Axtell (Axtell, Texas)
- College: Texas State; Texas Tech
- NFL draft: 1984: 5th round, 135th overall pick

Career history
- Pittsburgh Steelers (1984)*; Houston Gamblers (1984-1985); Pittsburgh Steelers (1986)*; St. Louis Cardinals (1986); Miami Dolphins (1987)*; Seattle Seahawks (1987); Atlanta Falcons (1987)*
- * Offseason or practice squad member only
- Stats at Pro Football Reference

Curtis Van Hughes (born November 14, 1960) is an American former professional football player who played defensive tackle and defensive end for two seasons with the St. Louis Cardinals and Seattle Seahawks of the National Football League (NFL).

== Early life ==
Hughes was born in Waco, Texas. He played high school football at Axtell High School as a fullback and gained 1,700 yards.

== Professional career ==
Hughes was drafted by the Pittsburgh Steelers in the fifth round of the 1984 NFL draft. He played eight career NFL games – seven with the 1986 St. Louis Cardinals and one with the 1987 Seattle Seahawks.
