= Mount Axtell =

Mountain in Ellsworth Land, Antarctica

- Location within Antarctica

Highest point
- Elevation: 1,272 m (4,173 ft)
- Listing: Mountains in Antarctica
- Coordinates: 81°18′S 85°6′W

Geography
- Continent: Antarctica
- Region: Ellsworth Land
- Parent range: Pirrit Hills

Mount Axtell is a low but distinctive rock peak 1.5 nautical miles (2.8 km; 1.7 mi) southeast of Mount Tidd in the Pirrit Hills, Ellsworth Land, Antarctica. It was positioned by the U.S. Ellsworth–Byrd Traverse Party, December 7, 1958, and named for William R. Axtell, Jr., U.S. Navy, cook at Ellsworth Station in 1958 who volunteered to accompany the traverse party.
