= Mount Turcotte =

Mountain in Ellsworth Land, Antarctica

Mount Turcotte (81°15′S 85°24′W) is a rock peak 2.5 nautical miles (4.6 km) northwest of Mount Tidd in the Pirrit Hills. It was positioned by the U.S. Ellsworth-Byrd Traverse Party on December 7, 1958, and was named for F. Thomas Turcotte, a seismologist with the party.
