= Axtell Independent School District =

School district in Texas

Location
- 308 Ottawa; Axtell, Texas ESC Region 12 USA
- Coordinates: 31°39′32″N 96°58′24″W

District information
- Type: Independent school district
- Motto: Aiming for Excellence
- Grades: Pre-K through 12
- Superintendent: Dr. JR Proctor
- Schools: 7 (2009-10)
- NCES District ID: 4809150

Students and staff
- Students: 773 (2013-14)
- Teachers: 77.85 (2009-10) (on full-time equivalent (FTE) basis)
- Student–teacher ratio: 9.85 (2009-10)
- Athletic conference: UIL Class 1A Football Division I
- District mascot: Longhorns
- Colors: Red, White

Other information
- TEA District Accountability Rating for 2011-12: Academically Acceptable
- Website: Axtell ISD

Axtell Independent School District is a public school district based in the community of Axtell, Texas (USA). The district is located in eastern McLennan County and extends into portions of Hill and Limestone counties.

== Finances ==
As of the 2010–2011 school year, the appraised valuation of property in the district was $111,700,000. The maintenance tax rate was $0.117 and the bond tax rate was $0.000 per $100 of appraised valuation.

== Academic achievement ==
In 2011, the school district was rated "academically acceptable" by the Texas Education Agency. Forty-nine percent of districts in Texas in 2011 received the same rating. No state accountability ratings will be given to districts in 2012. A school district in Texas can receive one of four possible rankings from the Texas Education Agency: Exemplary (the highest possible ranking), Recognized, Academically Acceptable, and Academically Unacceptable (the lowest possible ranking).

Historical district TEA accountability ratings

- 2011: Academically Acceptable
- 2010: Recognized
- 2009: Academically Acceptable
- 2008: Academically Acceptable
- 2007: Academically Acceptable
- 2006: Academically Acceptable
- 2005: Academically Acceptable
- 2004: Recognized

== Schools ==
In the 2011–2012 school year, the district had students in six schools.

Regular instructional

- Axtell High School (Grades 9-12)
- Axtell Middle School (Grades 6-8)
- Axtell Elementary School (Grades PK-5)

Alternative instructional

- Axtell Bruceville-Eddy Learning Center (Grades 4-12)
- Waco Center for Youth (Grades 7-12)

JJAEP instructional

- Challenge Academy (Grades 6-12)

Closed schools

- Methodist Home Boys Ranch

== See also ==
- List of school districts in Texas
- List of high schools in Texas
