= Axtell High School =

Axtell High School may refer to:

- Axtell High School, Axtell, Kansas
- Axtell High School, Axtell, Nebraska
- Axtell High School (Texas), Axtell, Texas
