= Mount Goodwin =

Mountain in Ellsworth Land, Antarctica

Mount Goodwin (81°16′S 85°33′W) is a rock peak that is the second most prominent summit in the Pirrit Hills of Antarctica. It was positioned by the U.S. Ellsworth–Byrd Traverse Party on December 10, 1958, and was named for Robert J. Goodwin, a glaciologist with the traverse party.

== See also ==
- Mountains in Antarctica
