= Gronau Nunataks =

Greenlandic mountain range

- Gronau Nunatakker
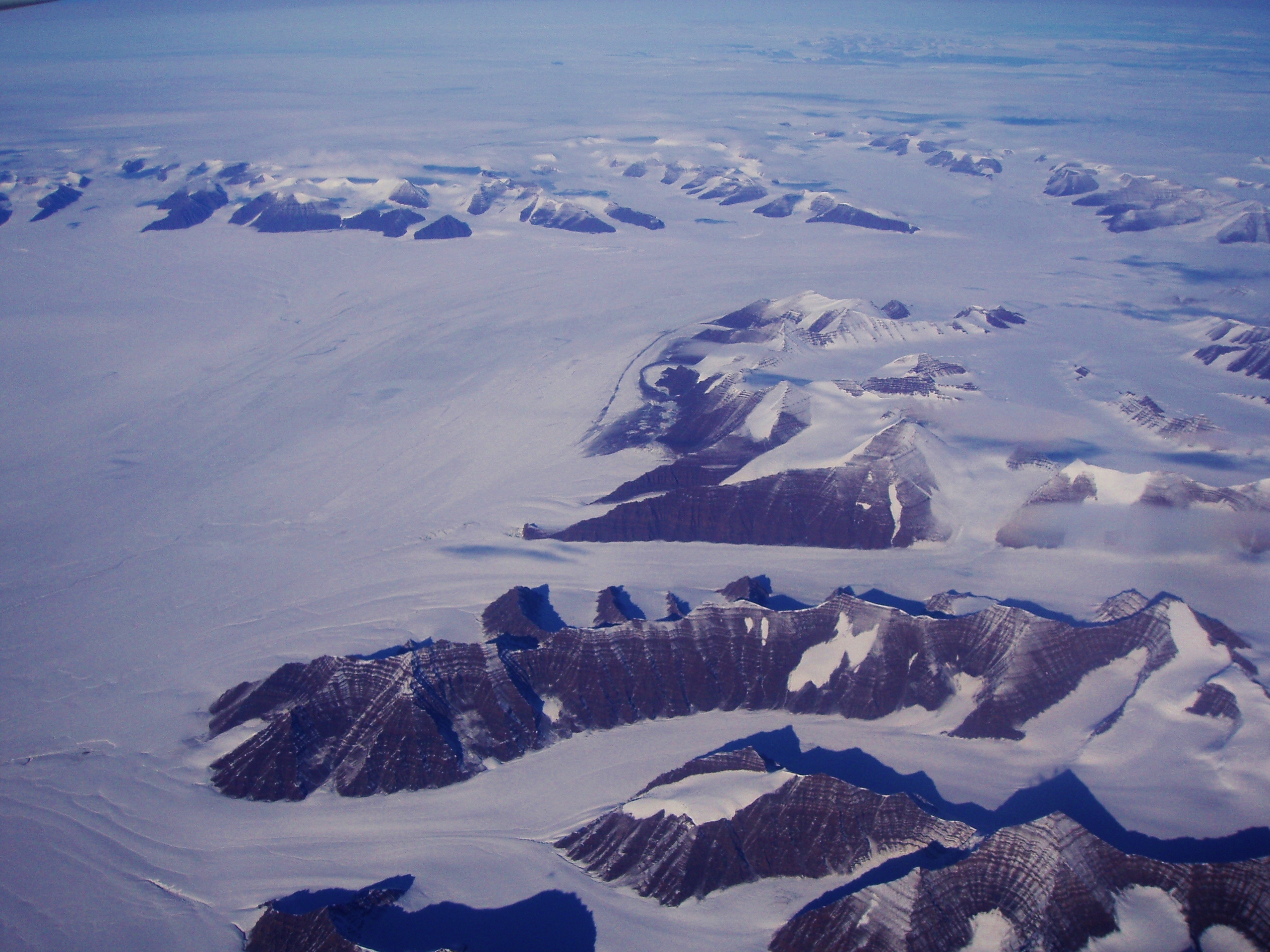
- Southward bend in the Christian IV Glacier with the Gronau Nunataks in the background and the NW part of the Watkins Range in the forefront.

Highest point
- Peak: Highest point
- Elevation: 2,810 m (9,220 ft)

Dimensions
- Length: 80 km (50 mi) E/W
- Width: 33 km (21 mi) N/S

Geography
- Location within Greenland
- Country: Greenland
- Region: Sermersooq
- Range coordinates: 69°27′N 30°15′W

The Gronau Nunataks (Danish: Gronau Nunatakker) is a mountain range in King Christian IX Land, eastern Greenland. Administratively this range is part of the Sermersooq Municipality.

== History ==
This group of nunataks at the edge of the vast Greenland Ice Sheet was first reported by German aviation pioneer Wolfgang von Gronau during his 1930 transatlantic flight on a Dornier Wal.

The existence of the range was later confirmed by Lauge Koch during flights in 1933 that were part of the 1931–34 Three-year Expedition to East Greenland (Treårsekspeditionen). Following the subsequent survey and mapping of the mountains they were named after Wolfgang von Gronau.

== Geography ==
The Gronau Nunataks is a long cluster of nunataks. It is located north of the Watkins Range, beyond the large Christian IV Glacier and to the northeast of the Lindbergh Range. The Greenland Ice Sheet lies to the north and the Wager Nunataks further to the east. The Gronau Glacier is located in the western part of the mountains. The area of the range is remote and uninhabited.

The Dødemandstoppene (Danish for "Mountains of the Dead", lit. "Peaks of the Dead Men") is a geographic division or part of the Gronau Nunataks located on the eastern side of the Grønlands Styrelse Glacier. The name originated in 1934 at the time of the British Trans-Greenland Expedition by Sir Martin Lindsay in which the dark pyramid or tomb-like mountains were deemed sinister when first seen.

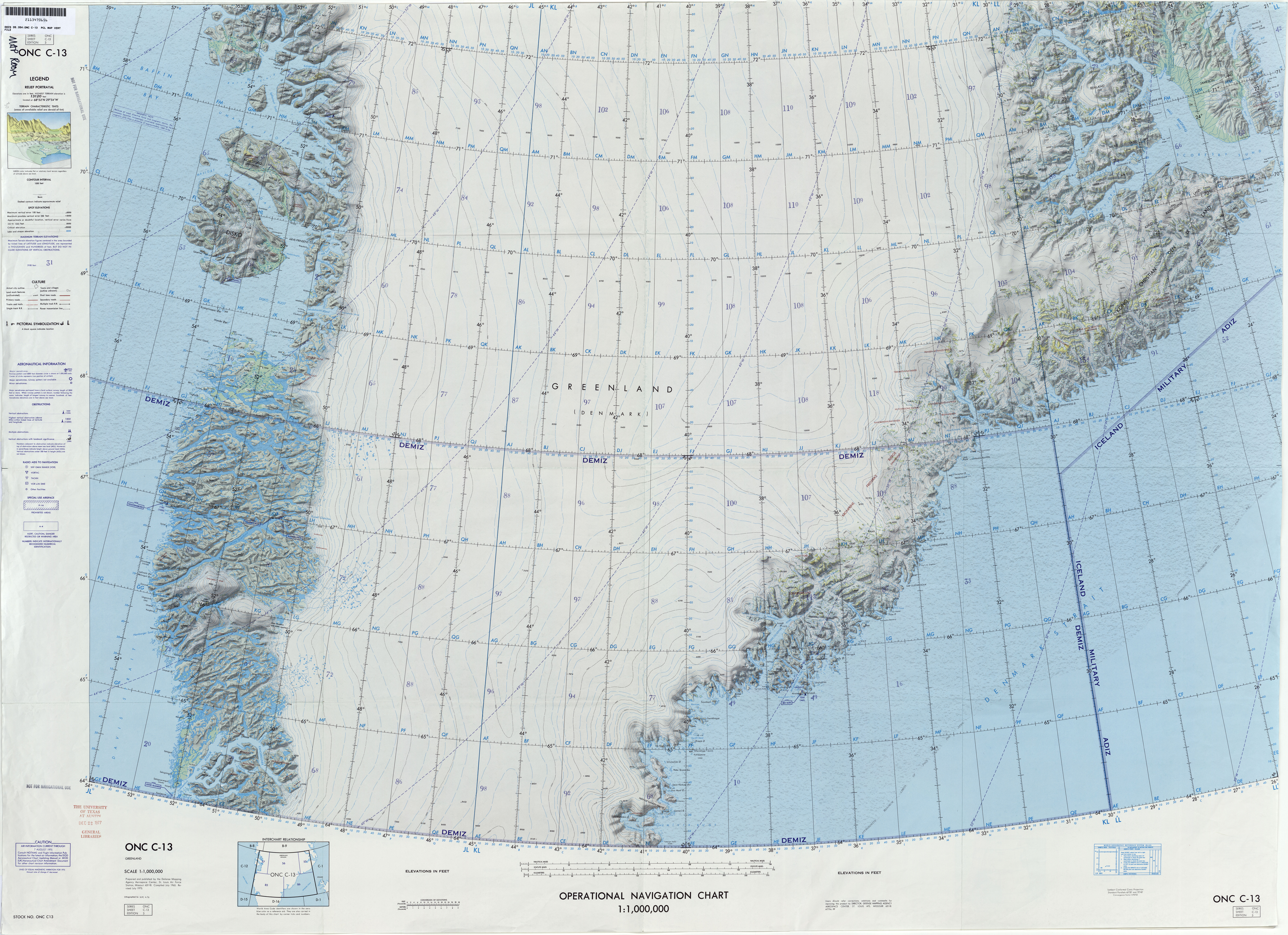
Defense Mapping Agency map of Greenland sheet

=== Peaks ===
The highest point of the Gronau Nunataks is a 2,810 m mountain. The area has been explored in recent decades by alpinists and some of the peaks have been named, but data are lacking regarding the exact location of certain peaks. Some of the summits named recently are the following:

- HP (2,810 m); highest peak at 69°27′35″N 30°8′2″W
- Pilotsbjerg (2,726 m) at 69°26′9″N 30°12′44″W
- Byrnesfjeld (2,628 m) at 69°34′25″N 29°17′33″W
- Mount Currahee (2,612 m) at 69°35′33″N 29°55′1″W
- Abbottsbjerg (2,609 m) at 69°36′9″N 29°38′38″W
- Helenasbjerg (2,603 m) at 69°34′32″N 29°14′46″W
- Elizabethsbjerg (2,602 m) at 69°19′54″N 28°30′8″W
- Mount Brasenose (2,562 m) at 69°33′27″N 29°17′48″W
- Mount Ward (2,550 m) at 69°12′34″N 28°27′44″W
- Hannahsbjerg (2,520 m) at 69°30′55″N 29°14′8″W
- Qureshisbjerg (2,517 m) at 69°30′26″N 29°15′55″W
- Schwerdtfegersbjerg (2,479 m) at 69°30′9″N 29°11′4″W
- Charlottesbjerg (2,444 m) at 69°26′55″N 28°51′15″W
- Sarah’s Spur (1,975 m) at 69°8′13″N 28°26′12″W

== Climate ==
Being so close to the Greenland Ice Sheet, Polar climate prevails in the Gronau Nunataks. The average annual temperature in the area of the range is -18 °C. The warmest month is July when the average temperature reaches -4 °C and the coldest is February when the temperature sinks to -25 °C.

== See also ==
- List of mountain ranges of Greenland
- List of mountains of Greenland
- List of nunataks of Greenland
