= Cat Nunatak =

Nunatak in Victoria Land, Antarctica

Cat Nunatak (77°29′S 163°29′E) is a nunatak in Antarctica, midway between Vince Nunatak and Hogback Hill in the southern part of Wilson Piedmont Glacier, Victoria Land. It was so named by the New Zealand Geographic Board in 1994, in recollection that ship's cats accompanied the Morning and the Terra Nova on R. F. Scott's 1901–04 and 1910–13 expeditions to McMurdo Sound.
