= Jekselen Peak =

Mountain in Queen Maud Land, Antarctica

Jekselen Peak (72°0′S 2°33′W) is, at 1,405 metres (4,610 ft), the highest peak in a small ridge 7 nautical miles (13 km) east-southeast of Mount Schumacher, in the Ahlmann Ridge of Queen Maud Land, Antarctica. It was mapped by Norwegian cartographers from surveys and air photos by the Norwegian–British–Swedish Antarctic Expedition (1949–52) and from air photos by the Norwegian expedition (1958–59) and named Jekselen (the molar).
