= Gårekneet Ridge =

Rock ridge in Antarctica

Gårekneet Ridge (72°4′S 14°48′E) is a rock ridge 3 nautical miles (6 km) south of Garenevkalven Nunatak in the Payer Mountains of Queen Maud Land, Antarctica. It was photographed from the air by the Third German Antarctic Expedition (1938–39), mapped by Norwegian cartographers from surveys and air photos by the Sixth Norwegian Antarctic Expedition (1956–60) and named Gårekneet.
