= Urnosa Spur =

Ridge of Queen Maud Land

Coordinates: 73°47′S 5°2′W

Urnosa Spur is a spur at the west side of Urfjelldokka Valley, in the southwest part of the Kirwan Escarpment in Queen Maud Land. Mapped by Norwegian cartographers from surveys and air photos by Norwegian-British-Swedish Antarctic Expedition (NBSAE) (1949–52) and additional air photos (1958–59). They gave the name Urnosa (the rock-strewn nose).
