= Charles D. Mize =

United States Marine Corps general (1921–1998)

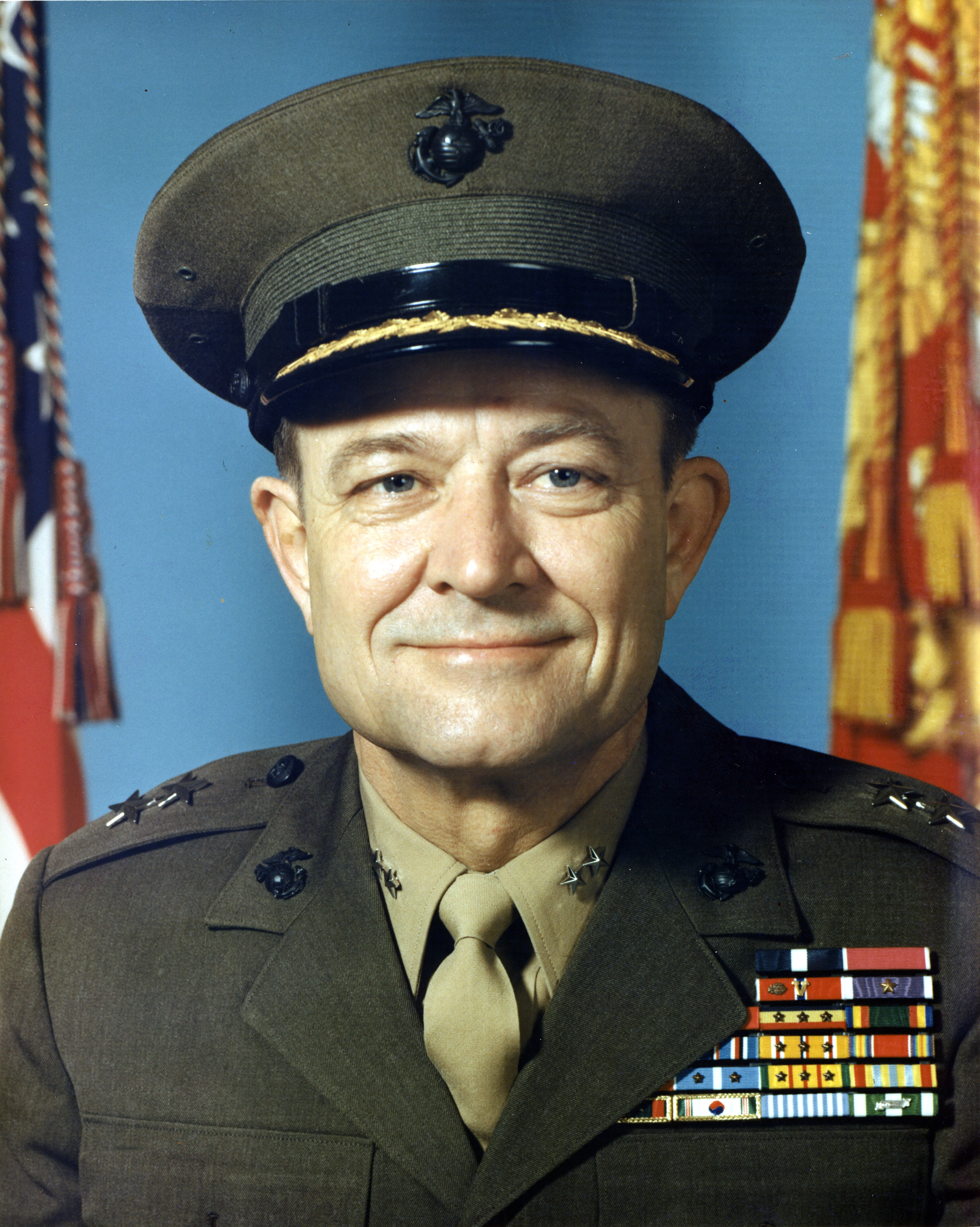
- MG Charles D. Mize, USMC
- Born: December 4, 1921; Cave Spring, Georgia, US
- Died: December 10, 1998 (aged 77); Alexandria, Virginia, US
- Burial place: United States Naval Academy Cemetery
- Relatives: MG David M. Mize (son)
- Military career
- Allegiance: United States
- Branch: United States Marine Corps
- Service years: 1944–1976
- Rank: Major general
- Service number: 0-38729
- Commands: 1st Marine Division
- Conflicts: World War II; Battle of Okinawa; Korean War; Battle of Pusan Perimeter; Battle of Inchon; Second Battle of Seoul; Battle of Chosin Reservoir; Vietnam War; Tet Offensive
- Awards: Navy Cross; Legion of Merit (2); Bronze Star Medal (2); Purple Heart (2)

Charles Davis Mize (December 4, 1921 – December 10, 1998) was a highly decorated officer of the United States Marine Corps with the rank of major general. He was decorated with the Navy Cross, the United States military's second-highest decoration awarded for valor in combat, during Korean War. Mize completed his career as commanding general, 1st Marine Division. His son, David M. Mize, also served in the Marines and reached the rank of major general as his father did.

== Early career and World War II ==
Charles D. Mize was born on December 4, 1921, in Cave Spring, Georgia, as the son of farmer Hershel Edgar and Annie Ruth Mize. He attended the local high school and subsequently entered the Darlington School in Rome, Georgia, in summer 1939. However, Mize left the school during the following year in order to accept appointment to the United States Naval Academy at Annapolis, Maryland.

During his time at the academy, Mize was active in football and swimming teams. He graduated on June 7, 1944, with Bachelor of Science degree in electrical engineering and was commissioned second lieutenant in the Marine Corps on the same date.

Upon his graduation, Mize completed the Reserve Officers Course at Marine Corps Schools, Quantico in January 1945 and was ordered to Camp Lejeune, North Carolina, where he joined 55th Replacement Draft as platoon leader. He was attached as Rifle platoon leader to the Company F, 2nd Battalion, 29th Marines under Colonel Victor Bleasdale and sailed with 6th Marine Division for Okinawa in March 1945.

Mize went ashore at the beginning of April, but was shot in the upper arm by a Japanese soldier he was flushing out of a cave. He was ordered to the United States for treatment and was promoted to the rank of first lieutenant in July 1945. Mize received the Purple Heart medal for his wounds and Navy Presidential Unit Citation for participation of his division in Okinawa.

== Postwar career ==
His recovery lasted until November of that year and subsequently joined Marine detachment at Charleston Navy Yard for duty as Company Officer in Guard Company. Mize was transferred to the Marine Barracks Parris Island, South Carolina in January 1946 and served as Commander of Military Police Company until June of that year.

Mize was subsequently transferred to Detroit, Michigan for duty as Assistant Inspector-Instructor, 17th Reserve Infantry Battalion. He was transferred to Peoria, Illinois, in September 1947 and served as inspector-instructor, Company C, 8th Reserve Infantry Battalion, until July 1949. He joined 3rd Battalion, 5th Marine Regiment on Guam in July 1949 and followed the regiment to Camp Pendleton, California in February 1950.

=== Korean War ===
Following the outbreak of Korean War in June 1950, 5th Marines were attached to the 1st Provisional Marine Brigade under Brigadier General Edward A. Craig and ordered to the Far East area at the end of July of that year. Mize served as Platoon Commander in Company G, 3rd Battalion, 5th Marines at that time and landed in Pusan Perimeter on August 4.

During the fighting near Kosong, commander of Company H, Captain Joseph C. Fegan Jr. (future Lieutenant general) was severely wounded by enemy fire on August 18 and unable to move. Even Mize was one foot smaller and hundred pounds lighter than Fegan who had almost 6,6 foot, he hoisted him over his shoulder and carry him over the rough terrain to the Field dressing station. This feat saved Fegan's life and both men remained friends for the rest of their lives.

Mize subsequently participated in the landing on Inchon at the beginning of September 1950 and later took part in the fighting near Hill 216 in the vicinity of Seoul, where commander of Company G, Robert D. Bohn was wounded on September 23 and evacuated to the rear for treatment. Mize subsequently assumed command of the Company G and led it during the recapture of Seoul, where he participated in the heavy street combats. He was wounded, but refused to be evacuated and continued to lead his company during the capture of General Government Palace, where Marines under his command tore down North Korean flags flying over its dome and ran up American flags, then routed the enemy troops, moving room by room. For this act of valor, Mize received the Navy Cross, the United States military's second-highest decoration awarded for valor in combat. He also received Gold Star in lieu of his second Purple Heart for wounds.

His official Navy Cross citation reads:

The President of the United States of America takes pleasure in presenting the Navy Cross to First Lieutenant Charles D. Mize (MCSN: 0-38729), United States Marine Corps, for extraordinary heroism in connection with military operations against an armed enemy of the United Nations while serving as Commanding Officer of Company G, Third Battalion, Fifth Marines, FIRST Marine Division (Reinforced), in action against enemy aggressor forces in the Republic of Korea from 23 to 27 September 1950. When the Company Commander was wounded and evacuated from Hill 216 in the vicinity of Seoul, First Lieutenant Mize immediately assumed command of the company and, by his alert and efficient leadership, successfully assisted the Battalion in carrying out its mission of protecting the FIRST Marine Division's left flank from counterattack and enemy infiltration. During a coordinated attack against heavy hostile resistance at the approaches to Seoul from 24 to 27 September, he repeatedly exposed himself to accurate and intensive hostile small-arms, automatic and mortar fire in order to direct the fire of his company and to encourage his men. Refusing to be evacuated when wounded in action, he continued to lead his company in overrunning enemy positions and seizing the desired objectives. In a later attack against the enemy through the streets of Seoul, he led his company in capturing the Government General Palace in the face of heavy resistance and hoisted the United States flag over the building. His courage, outstanding leadership and loyal devotion to duty throughout reflect the highest credit upon First Lieutenant Mize and the United States Naval Service.

He rejoined his company soon thereafter and led it during the winter campaign in November of that year in Chosin Reservoir. Mize and his company reached the village of Yudam-ni, deep in the North Korean territory, but after People's Republic of China launched a counteroffensive, they were ordered to retreat. Only 40 Marines left in his company, exhausted, hungry and suffering greatly in the subzero cold, but Mize led them to the port of Hungnam during a 10-day, 70-mile journey, taking their wounded with them. They were subsequently evacuated to the safety and Mize was decorated with the Bronze Star Medal with Combat "V" for his efforts during the Hungnam evacuation.

Mize and his company were subsequently ordered to the area near Masan, for rest and he was promoted to the rank of captain in January 1951. He remained with his company until the beginning of March 1951 and then returned to the United States. Mize also received another three Navy Presidential Unit Citations during his service in Korea.

== Later career ==
Following his return to the States and brief vacation with family, Mize joined Executive department of United States Naval Academy at Annapolis, Maryland. He served in this capacity until June 1954 when he was ordered to the Junior Course, Amphibious Warfare School Quantico. During his instruction there, he was promoted to the rank of major in December of that year and completed the school in June 1955. Mize was transferred to Hawaii in August of that year and served as company commander with 3rd Shore Party Battalion, 4th Marine Regiment, 3rd Marine Division. He later served as Regimental logistics and mess officer and left Hawaii in October 1957.

Mize was subsequently transferred to Washington, D.C., where he serves at Headquarters Marine Corps as a special plans officer, Armed Forces Special Weapons Project, Defense Atomic Support Agency. While in this capacity, he was promoted to the rank of lieutenant colonel in July 1960 and ordered to the Marine Corps Schools, Quantico in order to attend the Senior course, which he completed in June 1961.

He then rejoined 3rd Marine Division under the command of major general Donald M. Weller and served as assistant operations officer until October 1962. Mize was stationed in Japan during this assignment and returned to the United States for duty at Quantico. Mize served as an instructor within Senior Course at Marine Corps Schools, Quantico until June 1965. He then served at Camp Lejeune, North Carolina with 2nd Marine Division as commanding officer, 2nd Shore Party Battalion. Mize was transferred to the 2nd Division staff in March 1966 and served under Major General Ormond R. Simpson as Divisional Personnel officer (G-1). He was promoted to the rank of colonel in June of that year and ordered to the Army War College at Carlisle Barracks, Pennsylvania for instruction in August 1967.

=== Vietnam War ===
Upon graduation in June 1968, Mize was ordered to South Vietnam and attached to the U.S. Military Assistance Command under General William Westmoreland as deputy director, Combat Operations Center. He was stationed in Da Nang during Tet Offensive and transferred to the staff of IV Corps (Delta Military Assistance Command) under Major General George S. Eckhardt in November 1968.

Within this command, he served as operations officer at the headquarters in Can Tho and was responsible for the planning of the military operations in the Mekong Delta. He served in this capacity until July 1969 and received the Legion of Merit by the army. Mize was also decorated with his second Bronze Star Medal for a helicopter rescue of wounded troops while under enemy fire and Armed Forces Honor Medal, 1st Class by the Government of South Vietnam.

=== General's duty ===
Following his return to the United States and vacation with his family, Mize was attached to the Marine Corps Development and Education Command at Quantico and served under Lieutenant General Lewis J. Fields as commanding officer of schools demonstration troops until his promotion to the rank of brigadier general in October 1970.

He was subsequently transferred to the Headquarters Marine Corps for duty as special assistant in recruiting matters to the deputy director of personnel. Mize served in Washington until July 1971 and then was ordered back to the Marine Corps Base Quantico for duty as deputy base commander for support under Lieutenant General William G. Thrash. He received his second star upon the promotion to major general in July 1973 and assumed duty as director, Office of Naval Disability Evaluation. In this capacity, Mize was responsible for the determination if Marines and other military personnel are capable of continuing to perform military duties.

Mize received his final assignment in June 1975, when he was ordered to Camp Pendleton, California for duty as commanding general, 1st Marine Division. He was tasked with the reconstitution of the division, following its return from Vietnam. Many marines under his command were committing crimes or other minor offenses and Commandant Louis H. Wilson ordered "purging the Corps of its bad apples." During his tenure as commanding general, Mize discharged thousands of marines from his 18,000 division for everything from initiating riots to dealing drugs.

He then focused on programs for attaining the increased combat readiness and also ordered extensive amphibious training. Mize was decorated with his second Legion of Merit for his service with the division and was succeeded by Major General Edward A. Wilcox on July 29, 1976. He retired two days later completing 32 years of active service.

== Retirement ==
After retiring from the Marine Corps, Mize settled in Falls Church, Virginia, and became local builder. He was a partner in the Wilson-Mize Construction Company for next 18 years and also was a member of the Army-Navy Country Club, the Capital Exchange Club and the Naval Academy Alumni Association.

Mize died on December 10, 1998, at Inova Alexandria Hospital, following the complications with pneumonia and leukemia. He was survived by his wife, Martha Ann; sons David and Randy and daughters Sally and Ann. General Mize is buried at United States Naval Academy Cemetery at Annapolis, Maryland. His son David M. Mize also served in the Marines and reached the rank of major general.

== Decorations ==
Below is the ribbon bar of Major General Charles D. Mize:

1st Row	Navy Cross		Legion of Merit with one 5/16" Gold Star	Bronze Star Medal with Combat "V" and Oak Leaf Cluster
2nd Row	Purple Heart with one 5/16" Gold Star	Combat Action Ribbon	Navy Presidential Unit Citation with three stars	Navy Unit Commendation
3rd Row	American Defense Service Medal	American Campaign Medal	Asiatic-Pacific Campaign Medal with three 3/16 inch service stars	World War II Victory Medal
4th Row	National Defense Service Medal with one star	Korean Service Medal with two 3/16 inch service stars	Vietnam Service Medal with three 3/16 inch service stars	Vietnam Armed Forces Honor Medal, 1st Class
5th Row	Republic of Korea Presidential Unit Citation	Vietnam Civil Actions Medal Unit Citation	United Nations Korea Medal	Vietnam Campaign Medal

Military offices
Preceded by William L. McCulloch	Commanding General, 1st Marine Division; June 2, 1975 - July 29, 1976	Succeeded by Edward A. Wilcox
