= Glopeneset =

Promontory in Antarctica

Glopeneset (72°11′S 10°0′E) is a mainly ice-covered promontory at the south side of Glopeflya Plain and the Orvin Mountains in Queen Maud Land, Antarctica. It was first photographed from the air by the Third German Antarctic Expedition (1938–39). It was mapped by Norwegian cartographers from surveys and air photos by the Sixth Norwegian Antarctic Expedition (1956–60) and named Glopeneset (the ravine promontory).
