= Nils Jørgen Peaks =

Group of peaks in Queen Maud Land, Antarctica

Nils Jorgen Peaks (71°52′S 2°36′W) is a group of small peaks about 6 nautical miles (11 km) northeast of Mount Schumacher on the Ahlmann Ridge in Queen Maud Land. Mapped by Norwegian cartographers from surveys and air photos by Norwegian-British-Swedish Antarctic Expedition (NBSAE) (1949–52) and air photos by the Norwegian expedition (1958–59). Named for Nils Jorgen Schumacher, senior meteorologist with the NBSAE.
