= Bolten Peak =

Mountain in Antarctica

Bolten Peak (71°49′S 1°44′W) is a small isolated peak 3 nautical miles (6 km) north of the Litvillingane Rocks, on the east side of Ahlmann Ridge in Queen Maud Land. It was mapped by Norwegian cartographers from surveys and from air photos by the Norwegian–British–Swedish Antarctic Expedition (1949–52) and from air photos by the Sixth Norwegian Antarctic Expedition (1958–59), and named "Bolten" (the bolt).
