= Peary Nunatak =

Nunatak in Greenland

- Location within Greenland

Highest point
- Elevation: 812 m (2,664 ft)
- Listing: List of mountains in Greenland
- Coordinates: 64°45′12″N 41°05′30″W

Geography
- Location: King Christian IX Land, Greenland

Climbing
- First ascent: Possibly unclimbed

Peary Nunatak or Peary's Nunatak is a nunatak in King Christian IX Land, Sermersooq Municipality, Greenland.

== Geography ==
Peary Nunatak is a nunatak located 60 kilometres (37 mi) southwest of Comanche Bay. It rises south of Whymper Nunatak and northwest of Ravna Nunatak, about 10 kilometres (6.2 mi) west of the seashore. Its elevation is 812 metres (2,664 ft).

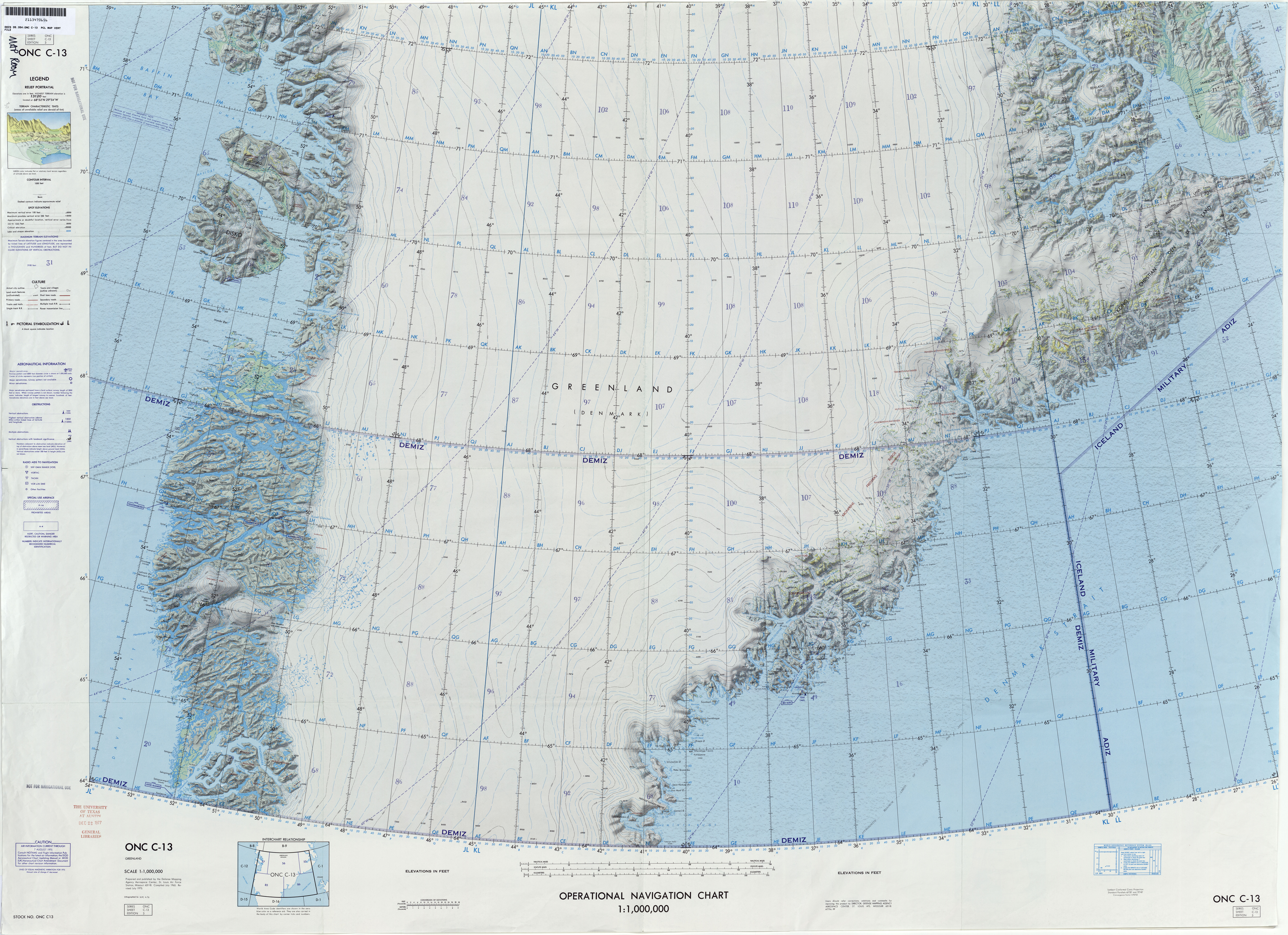
Defense Mapping Agency map of Greenland sheet.

== See also ==
- List of nunataks of Greenland
