= Lincoln Nunatak =

Nunatak in Graham Land, Antarctica

Lincoln Nunatak (67°27′S 68°43′W) is a snow-capped nunatak with a rocky west face, at the end of a ridge running westward from Mount Mangin on Adelaide Island, Antarctica. It was named by the UK Antarctic Place-Names Committee for Flight Lieutenant Warren D. Lincoln, Royal Air Force, a pilot with the British Antarctic Survey Aviation Unit based at Adelaide Station in 1962–63.
