= Trollkjelneset Headland =

Headland in Antarctica

Trollkjelneset Headland (71°25′S 1°0′W) is a snow-domed headland rising between Krylvika Bight and the mouth of Jutulstraumen Glacier in Queen Maud Land. Mapped by Norwegian cartographers from surveys and air photos by Norwegian-British-Swedish Antarctic Expedition (NBSAE) (1949–52) and air photos by the Norwegian expedition (1958–59) and named Trollkjelneset (cape of the troll's cauldron).
