= Urfjell Cliffs =

Line of cliffs in Antarctica

Urfjell Cliffs (73°53′S 5°17′W) is a line of rock cliff and spurs trending southwest for 10 nautical miles (18 km) from Urfjelldokka Valley, forming a part of the Kirwan Escarpment in Queen Maud Land. Mapped by Norwegian cartographers from surveys and air photos by Norwegian-British-Swedish Antarctic Expedition (NBSAE) (1949–52) and additional air photos (1958–59). They gave the Urfjell (mountain with rock-strewn slopes).
