= Lorentzen Peak =

Mountain in Queen Maud Land, Antarctica

Lorentzen Peak (71°45′S 2°50′W) is a peak 5 nautical miles (9 km) south of Vesleskarvet Cliff and 6 nautical miles (11 km) west of Tommeliten Rock, on the west side of Ahlmann Ridge in Queen Maud Land, Antarctica. It was mapped by Norwegian cartographers from surveys and air photos by the Norwegian–British–Swedish Antarctic Expedition (NBSAE) (1949–52) and air photos by the Norwegian expedition (1958–59), and was named for Bjarne Lorentzen, a cook with the NBSAE.

The first known ascent was made by members of the SANAE expedition in January 1999. The team included Duncan Cromarty, Paul Boyens and Karel Koster.
