= Joseph C. Fegan Jr. =

American Marine Corps Lieutenant General

Joseph Charles Fegan Jr.
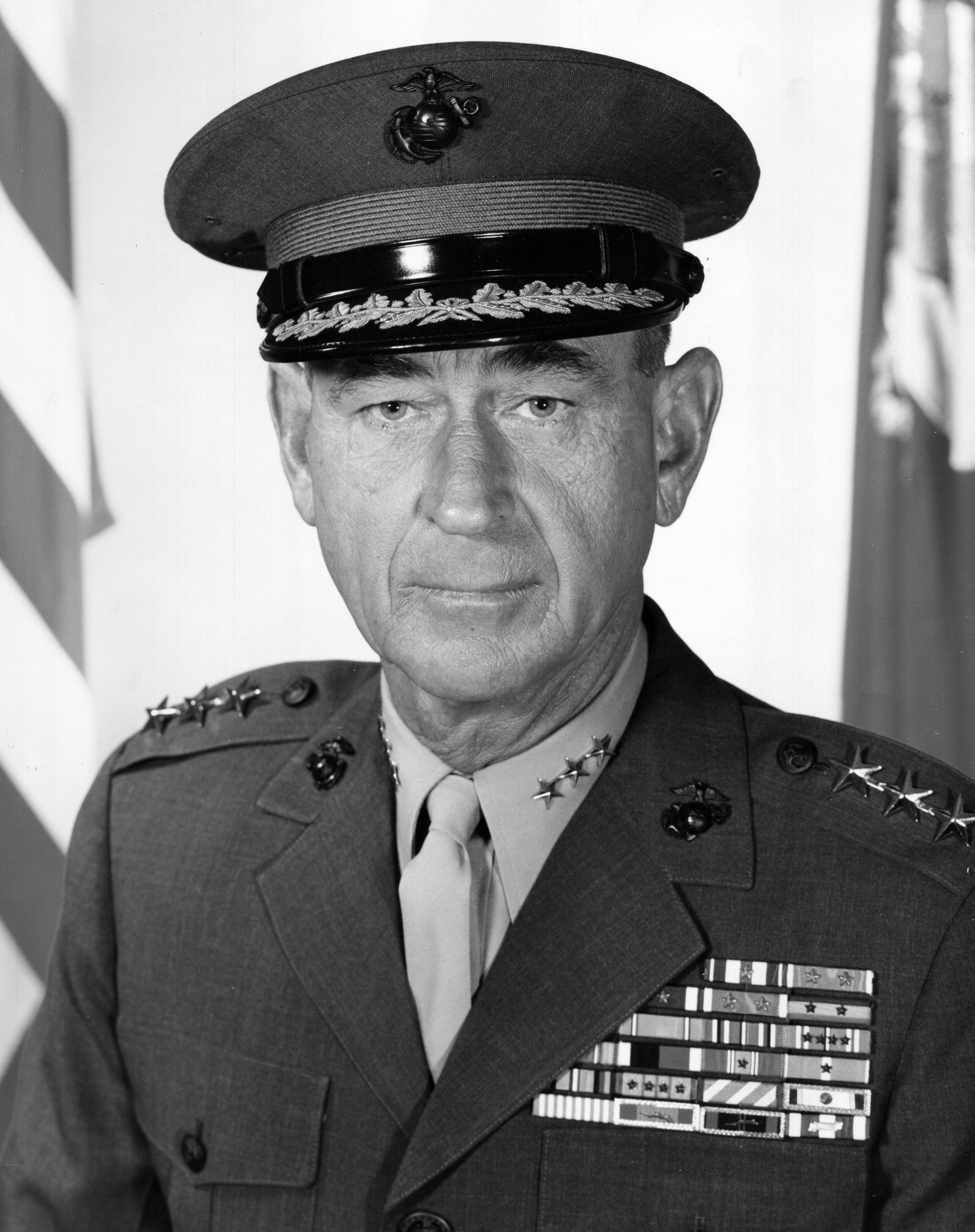
- LTG Joseph C. Fegan Jr., USMC
- Born: 21 December 1920; Los Angeles, California, US
- Died: 2 January 1991 (aged 70); San Diego, California, US
- Burial place: Fort Rosecrans National Cemetery
- Relatives: MG Joseph C. Fegan (father)
- Military career
- Allegiance: United States
- Branch: United States Marine Corps
- Service years: 1941–1978
- Rank: Lieutenant general
- Service number: 0-13485
- Commands: Develop. and Education Command; MCRD San Diego; 3rd Marine Division
- Conflicts: World War II: Battle of Kwajalein; Battle of Saipan; Battle of Tinian; Battle of Iwo Jima; Korean War: Battle of Pusan Perimeter; Vietnam War: Easter Offensive
- Awards: Distinguished Service Medal; Silver Star (2); Legion of Merit (3); Purple Heart (3); Navy Commendation Medal (2)

Joseph Charles Fegan Jr. (21 December 1920 – 2 January 1991) was a highly decorated officer in the United States Marine Corps with the rank of lieutenant general. A son of Major General Joseph C. Fegan, he received several citations for bravery during three wars and completed his career as commanding general, Marine Corps Development and Education Command.

== Early career and World War II ==
=== Stateside duty ===
Joseph C. Fegan Jr. was born on 21 December 1920, in Los Angeles, California, as the son of future Marine Major general, Joseph C. Fegan and Adelaide Loring Mitchell. Upon the graduation from high school, he enrolled the Princeton University, where he was active in Varsity football team as Tackle. Fegan also entered the ROTC unit and also enlisted the Marine Corps Reserve on 5 May 1941.

He completed the summer six weeks Platoon Leaders classes at the Marine Corps Base San Diego, where his father served as commanding general and reached the rank of private first class. Fegan was commissioned Reserve Second lieutenant on 31 July 1942, and upon graduation from Princeton with an A.B. in politics in November of that year, he was ordered to the Marine Corps Base Quantico for additional officer training. As part of his undergraduate degree, Fegan completed a senior thesis titled "The Military Problem in Haiti."

Fegan completed that training in February 1943 and then was ordered to the Field Artillery School also located at Quantico. He completed the training in April of that year and assumed duty as an Artillery Instructor at Camp Pendleton, California. Fegan was integrated into the regular Marine Corps in May 1943 and joined newly activated 4th Battalion, 14th Marine Artillery Regiment one month later.

The 14th Marines were subsequently attached to the 4th Marine Division under Major General Harry Schmidt and Fegan was promoted to first lieutenant in August 1943. He subsequently assumed command of Battery M of his battalion and took part in the intensive training at Camp Dunlap.

=== Duty in Pacific ===
He sailed with the 4th Marine Division to Pacific area at the beginning of January 1944 and led his company ashore during the Battle of Kwajalein at the beginning of February. Fegan and his battery provided support fire for advancing units of 1st Battalion, 23rd Marines and after the island was declared secured, it moved to Maui, Hawaii.

Fegan spent three months with training on Hawaii and embarked with his regiment for Marianas Islands in mid-May 1944. He took part in the landing on Saipan and led his battery ashore on 15 June 1944. Fegan boldly exposed himself to heavy and sustained enemy shelling to lead his battery into position and commence firing. By nightfall, with his entire emplacement under intense bombardment by shells and small-arms fire, he gallantly moved from one gun crew to another, encouraging and rallying his men and those in adjacent posts.

Later, although wounded while going to the aid of a gun crew stricken by a direct hit, he bravely continued to lead his battery and direct effective fire on the enemy. For his bravery and leadership of his battery during Saipan campaign, Fegan was decorated with the Silver Star and also received the Purple Heart for wounds.

He rejoined his battery soon after and led it during the capture of Tinian one month later and during the infamous battle of Iwo Jima in February and March 1945. Fegan also received Navy Presidential Unit Citation and Navy Unit Commendation ribbons.

== Postwar career ==
=== 1945-1949 ===
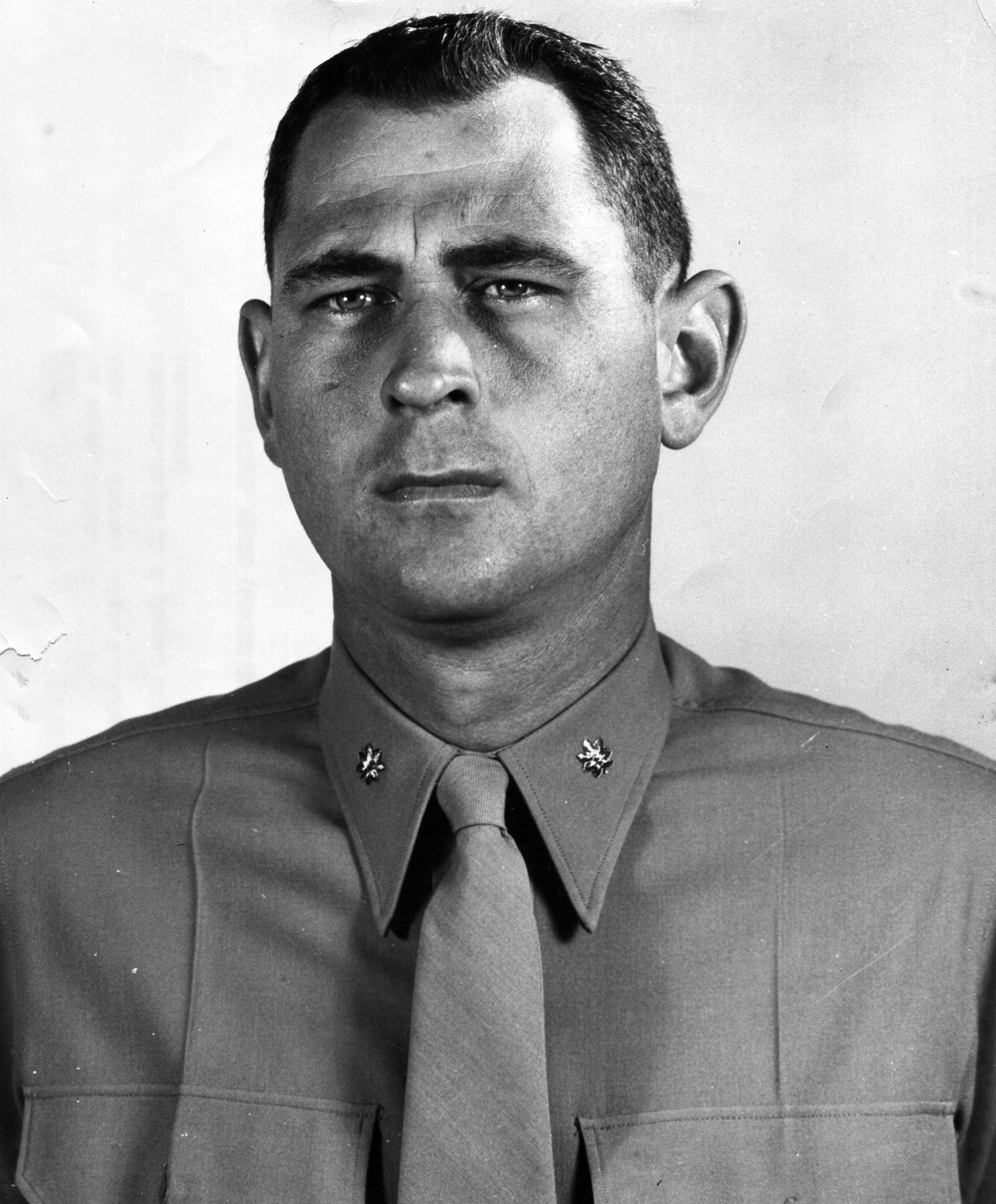
Fegan Jr. as Major in 1951.

Fegan returned to the United States in November 1945 and joined the Redistribution Regiment of the Marine Training and Replacement Command, San Diego Area at Camp Pendleton. The Redistribution Regiment was responsible for the redistribution of Marines arriving from Pacific area to the separation centers for discharge or to Marine Corps Base San Diego, for reassignment. Fegan served with that regiment consecutively as assistant logistics officer and company commander under Colonel Edward A. Craig until June 1946, when he was sent to Washington, D.C., for Gunnery Officers' Ordnance Course.

He subsequently completed the Advanced Naval Gunfire Course at Quantico and joined the staff of the Naval Gunfire School at Fleet Amphibious Training Center Coronado as newly promoted captain in September 1946. Fegan served as an instructor until December 1948, when he was ordered to Guam and attached to the 5th Marine Regiment.

The 5th Marines formed the bulk of 1st Provisional Marine Brigade under Brigadier General Edward A. Craig and Fegan served consecutively as assistant operations officer and company commander. He later returned with the regiment to Camp Pendleton, California where it had been rebuilt. During that time, he assumed command of Company H, 3rd Battalion.

=== Korea ===
Following the outbreak of Korean War in June 1950, the Fifth Marines sailed within 1st Provisional Marine Brigade to that country in order to reinforce allied ROK Army. Fegan arrived with the regiment to Korea at the beginning of August and took part in the defense of Pusan Perimeter. During the fighting near Chindong-ni on 8 August 1950, Fegan was assigned the mission of seizing a well organized enemy position, strongly manned with automatic weapons.

Without regard for his own safety, Captain Fegan led the advance and continually exposed himself to enemy fire to coordinate and direct the assault. He crossed open terrain, swept by heavy fire, on three occasions to evacuate wounded Marines. Despite the fact that he lost consciousness three times from heat prostration, he refused to be evacuated, but chose to remain with his command until the position was taken and the enemy overrun. For this act of valor, Fegan was decorated with his second Silver Star.

After treatment at the field hospital, he rejoined his company and led it during the fighting near Kosong on 18 August, when he was hit by enemy fire and unable to move. Thanks to the help of Platoon commander from Company G and future general, Charles D. Mize, Fegan survived. Although Mize was one foot smaller and hundred pounds lighter than Fegan who had almost 6,6 foot, he hoisted him over his shoulder and carry him over the rough terrain to the Field dressing station. This feat saved Fegan from dying on the battlefield and both men remained friends for the rest of their lives.

=== 1950-1966 ===
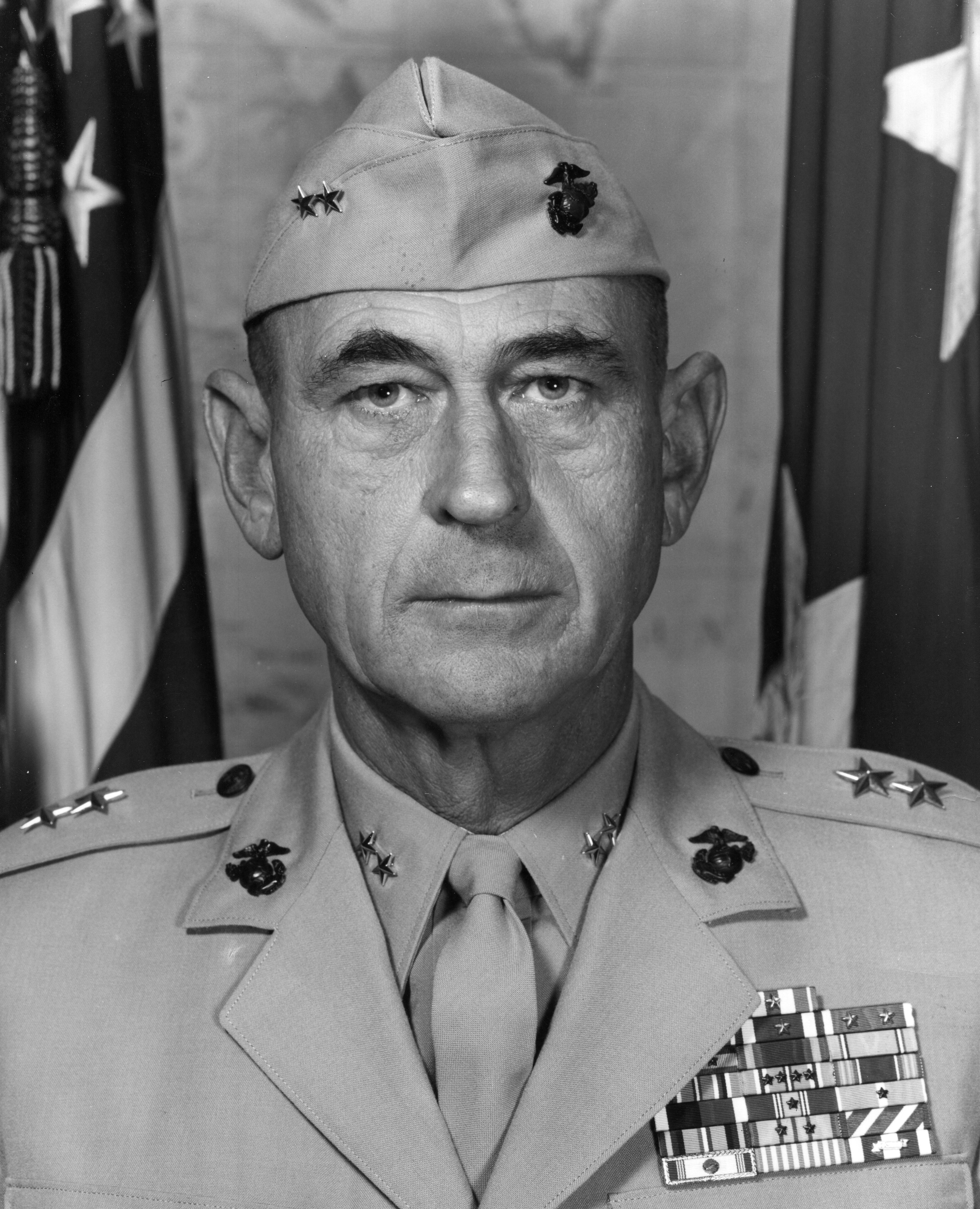
Fegan Jr. as Major general

Fegan was subsequently evacuated to the United States for treatment and following his recovery, he was promoted to major and appointed executive officer with 1st Recruit Battalion at Marine Corps Recruit Depot San Diego. He was later appointed an instructor with the NROTC unit at Yale University and remained in that capacity for almost two years.

He was subsequently ordered to Marine Corps Schools, Quantico, where he served as an instructor of newly commissioned marine officers at the Basic School until September 1953. Fegan was then sent to the Amphibious Warfare School at Quantico, which he completed in June 1954 and departed for Japan. He was appointed a representative of 3rd Marine Division Commanding General, James P. Riseley, to the Commander of U.S. Naval Forces, Far East. While in this capacity, he was decorated with the Navy Commendation Medal.

In January 1955, Fegan was sent to Hawaii, where he assumed duty as Regimental Operations officer, 4th Marine Regiment at Kāneʻohe Bay. He departed for United States in May of that year.

Following his arrival, Fegan completed the Spanish language course at Vox Institute of Language and the Strategic Intelligence School at Army Intelligence Center in Washington, D.C., before reporting to the American Embassy in Madrid, Spain as the Assistant Naval Attache and Assistant Naval Attache for Air and held that duty until December 1957. He was promoted to lieutenant colonel in May of that year.

After two years in Spain, Fegan returned to the United States and assumed duty as administrative assistant to the chairman, Inter-American Defense Board at Headquarters Marine Corps. In August 1959, he entered the Command and Staff College and Atomic Weapons Employment Course at Quantico and graduated in June 1960.

He subsequently joined the 2nd Marine Division under Major General James P. Berkeley at Camp Lejeune and consecutively served as commanding officer, 2nd Battalion, 10th Marines; executive officer, 10th Marine Regiment; commanding officer, 1st Battalion, 6th Marines and assistant operations officer, 2nd Marine Division.

In July 1963, Fegan joined the staff of the Basic School and served consecutively as operations officer and executive officer under Colonel Jonas M. Platt. He was co-responsible for the training of newly commissioned officers until July 1965, when he entered the course at National War College. While at the Basic school, Fegan was promoted to colonel in September 1964.

=== First tour in Vietnam ===
Upon graduation in June 1966, Fegan departed for South Vietnam and joined the headquarters, U.S. Military Assistance Command Vietnam in Saigon as deputy director, Combat Operations Center under Brigadier General John R. Chaisson. The Combat Operations Center was responsible for the performing the nerve-center function for General William Westmoreland as the latter did for the Joint Chiefs. The operations center had direct radio and teletype connections with Admiral U. S. Grant Sharp Jr.'s headquarters in Honolulu and the National Military Command Center.

Fegan remained in that capacity until July 1967, when he completed his tour and was ordered back to the United States for new assignment. For his service in that capacity, he was decorated by Army Legion of Merit and also received Vietnam Staff Service Medal, 1st Class by the Government of South Vietnam.

=== General's promotion ===
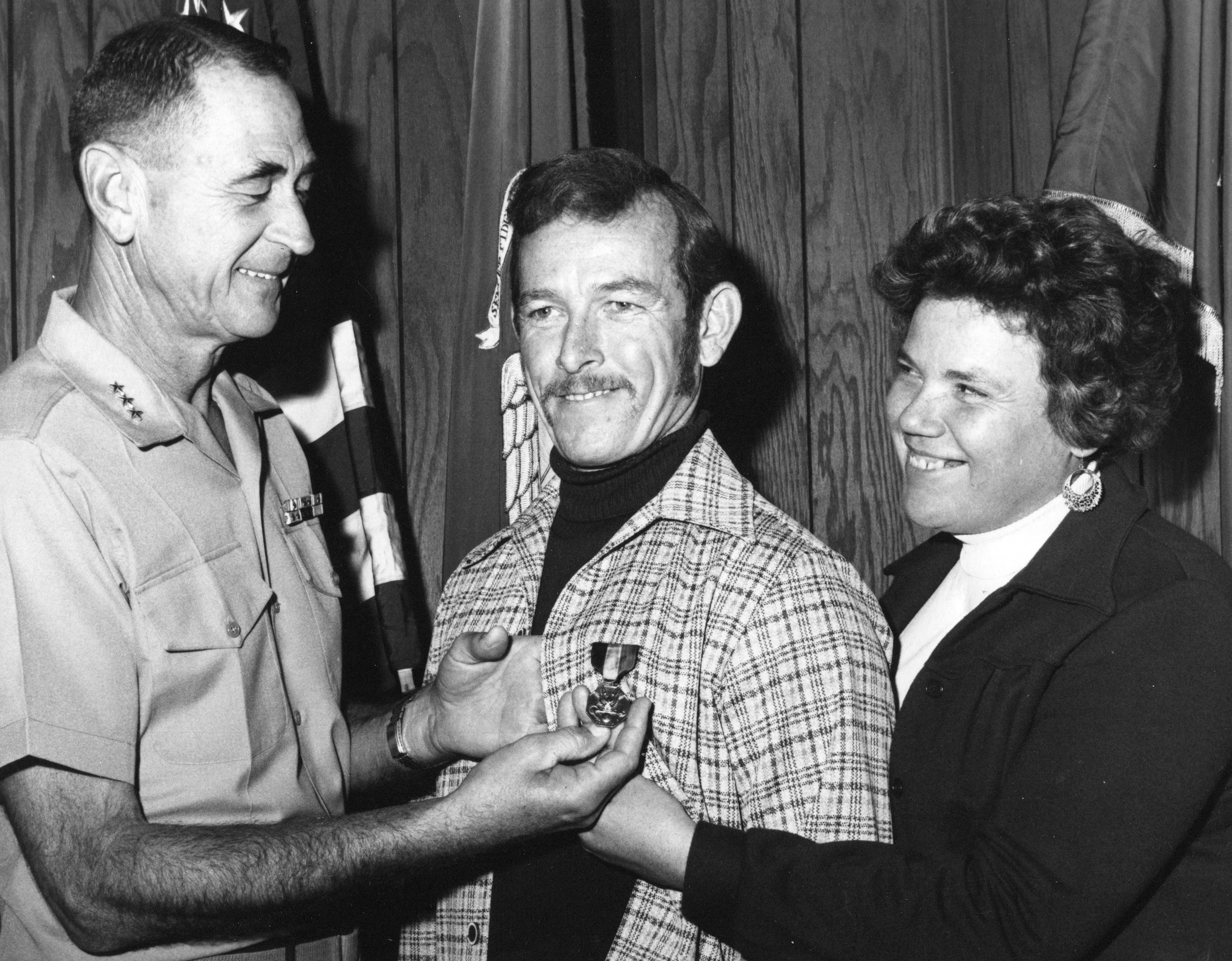
Fegan Jr. decorates former GySgt. Thomas F. Whalen Jr. for disarming fugitive.

He subsequently assumed duty as Marine Corps liaison officer in the Office of Joint Chiefs of Staff and held that assignment until November 1967, when he was appointed commanding officer, Marine Barracks, Washington, D.C. While in this capacity, Fegan also held dual responsibility as director of Marine Corps Institute until he was promoted to the rank of brigadier general in September 1968.

For his new rank, Fegan was ordered to Camp Lejeune and appointed assistant division commander, 2nd Marine Division under Major General Edwin B. Wheeler. He remained in that capacity until August 1969, when he was appointed commanding general of Force Troops, Fleet Marine Force Atlantic (FMFLANT). In this capacity, he was responsible for all independent units under FMFLANT such as support artillery units, antiaircraft artillery units, military police battalions, separate engineer units and other miscellaneous force units. For his service in this capacity, Fegan was decorated with second Navy Commendation Medal.

=== Later service ===
Fegan was promoted to major general in December 1971 and ordered to Okinawa, Japan, to assume command of 3rd Marine Division. He commanded that division during the Easter Offensive alert in 1972, when his units supported ARVN units. Fegan was decorated with a second Legion of Merit for his service with 3rd Marine Division and departed for United States in January 1973.

He was subsequently appointed commanding general, Marine Corps Recruit Depot San Diego and was responsible for the recruit training during the demobilization after withdrawal from Vietnam. Fegan was decorated with third Legion of Merit for his service in San Diego.

Following the promotion to lieutenant general on 30 August 1975, Fegan assumed duty as commanding general, Marine Corps Development and Education Command at Marine Corps Base Quantico. While in this capacity, he was responsible for the training and education at The Basic School, Officer Candidates School, Amphibious Warfare School and other facilities there. He also simultaneously commanded the Quantico Base until his retirement.

== Retirement ==
Fegan retired from the Marine Corps after 37 years of service on 1 May 1978, and received the Navy Distinguished Service Medal for his service at Quantico. Upon his retirement from the Marines, he settled in Point Loma, California, and served as foreman of the San Diego Grand Jury. Fegan was also active in Episcopalian church and Marine Corps Historical Foundation. He was also active in the Marine Corps Oral History Program and received a Certificate of Appreciation from the Commandant of the Marine Corps, Paul X. Kelley in June 1986.

Lieutenant General Joseph C. Fegan Jr. died on 2 January 1991, in Naval Hospital, San Diego, following a long battle with cancer. He and his wife, the former Maxine Ann Scholder, had two children, Ann Fegan Waldruff and Joseph C. Fegan III, a Marine Corps officer. Fegan is buried at Fort Rosecrans National Cemetery in San Diego together with his wife.

== Medals and decorations ==
Here is the ribbon bar of Lieutenant General Fegan Jr.:

1st row	Navy Distinguished Service Medal		Silver Star with one 5/16" Gold Star	
2nd row	Legion of Merit with two 5/16" Gold Stars	Navy Commendation Medal with one 5/16" Gold Star	Purple Heart with two 5/16" Gold Stars	Navy Presidential Unit Citation with two stars
3rd row	Navy Unit Commendation	American Defense Service Medal	American Campaign Medal	Asiatic-Pacific Campaign Medal with four 3/16 inch service stars
4th row	World War II Victory Medal	Navy Occupation Service Medal	Korean Service Medal with one 3/16 inch service star	National Defense Service Medal with one star
5th row	Armed Forces Expeditionary Medal	Vietnam Service Medal with four 3/16 inch service stars	Vietnam Staff Service Medal, 1st Class	Korean Presidential Unit Citation
6th row	United Nations Korea Medal	Vietnam Gallantry Cross Unit Citation	Vietnam Civil Actions Unit Citation	Vietnam Campaign Medal

== See also ==
- List of 3rd Marine Division Commanders

Military offices
Preceded by Edward S. Fris	Commanding General, Marine Corps Development and Education Command; 1 September 1975 – 30 April 1978	Succeeded by John H. Miller
Preceded by John N. McLaughlin	Commanding General, Marine Corps Recruit Depot San Diego; 1 February 1973 – 30 August 1975	Succeeded by Kenneth J. Houghton
Preceded by Louis Metzger	Commanding General, 3rd Marine Division; 8 January 1972 – 7 January 1973	Succeeded by Michael P. Ryan
