= Axtell (surname) =

Axtell is an English surname. Notable people with this surname include the following:

- Charles Axtell (1859–1932), American sport shooter, who competed in the 1908 Summer Olympics
- Daniel Axtell (1622–1660), captain of the Parliamentary Guard at the trial of King Charles I
- Frances Cleveland Axtell (1866–1953), one of the first female legislators in the United States of America
- George C. Axtell (1920–2011), Lieutenant General of the United States Marine Corps.
- James Axtell (1941–2023), professor of history at William and Mary in Williamsburg, Virginia. He was elected a Fellow of the American Academy of Arts and Sciences in 2004. Retired in 2008 and taught one final year at Princeton in 2009.
- James Wickliffe Axtell (1852–1909), newspaper man and prominent member of the Cumberland Presbyterian Church
- Robert Axtell, professor in Computational Social Science at George Mason University
- Samuel Beach Axtell (1819–1891), controversial Chief Justice of the New Mexico Territorial Supreme Court
