= Schwartz Range =

Mountain range in Antarctica

Coordinates: 67°8′S 55°38′E

Schwartz Range in Antarctica

Schwartz Range is a range of mountains trending in a NE-SW direction, standing 17 miles southwest of Edward VIII Bay, in Antarctica. It was discovered in November 1954 by R. Dovers and Georges Schwartz during an ANARE (Australian National Antarctic Research Expeditions) sledging journey to Edward VIII Bay. Named by the Antarctic Names Committee of Australia (ANCA) for Schwartz, who was French Observer with ANARE at Mawson Station in 1954.

== See also ==
- Cook Nunataks
