= Axtell, Virginia =

Unincorporated community in Virginia, United States

Coordinates: 37°42′5″N 78°36′5″W

Axtell is an unincorporated community in Buckingham County, in the U.S. state of Virginia.
