= Mount Schumacher =

Mountain in Queen Maud Land, Antarctica

Mount Schumacher (71°55′S 2°58′W) is a mountain, 1,230 m, standing 6 nautical miles (11 km) southwest of Nils Jorgen Peaks on the west side of Ahlmann Ridge in Queen Maud Land. Mapped by Norwegian cartographers from surveys and air photos by Norwegian-British-Swedish Antarctic Expedition (NBSAE) (1949–52) and air photos by the Norwegian expedition (1958–59). Named for Nils Jorgen Schumacher, senior meteorologist with the NBSAE.

== See also ==
- Jekselen Peak, the highest peak in a small ridge 7 nautical miles (13 km) east-southeast of Mount Schumacher
