= Knut T. Giæver =

Norwegian publisher

- Born: 10 June 1926; Oslo, Norway
- Died: 4 March 2015 (aged 88)
- Occupation: Publisher
- Relatives: Jo Giæver Tenfjord (brother)
- Awards: King's Medal of Merit in gold (1991)

Knut Torvald Giæver (10 June 1926 – 4 March 2015) was a Norwegian publisher.

He was born in Oslo, and was a brother of Jo Giæver Tenfjord. He was assigned director of the book sales club Den norske Bokklubben from 1964 to 1991. During his period the number of club members (including subsidiaries) reached about 600,000. He chaired Norske Siviløkonomers Forening from 1970 to 1974, and has been chairman of the board of Norsk Form, and board member of Nationaltheatret.

Giæver died on 4 March 2015, at the age of 88.

== Honours ==
- King's Medal of Merit in gold (1991)
