= Cook Nunataks =

Nunataks in Enderby Land, Antarctica

The Cook Nunataks (67°5′S 55°50′E) are a group of four nunataks at the northeast end of the Schwartz Range, in Enderby Land. They were mapped from Australian National Antarctic Research Expeditions (ANARE) surveys and air photos, 1954–66, and named by the Antarctic Names Committee of Australia for P.J. Cook, a geologist who visited the area with ANARE (Nella Dan) in 1965.
