= John H. Miller =

United States Marine Corps Lieutenant general (1925–2025)

John Harrison Miller
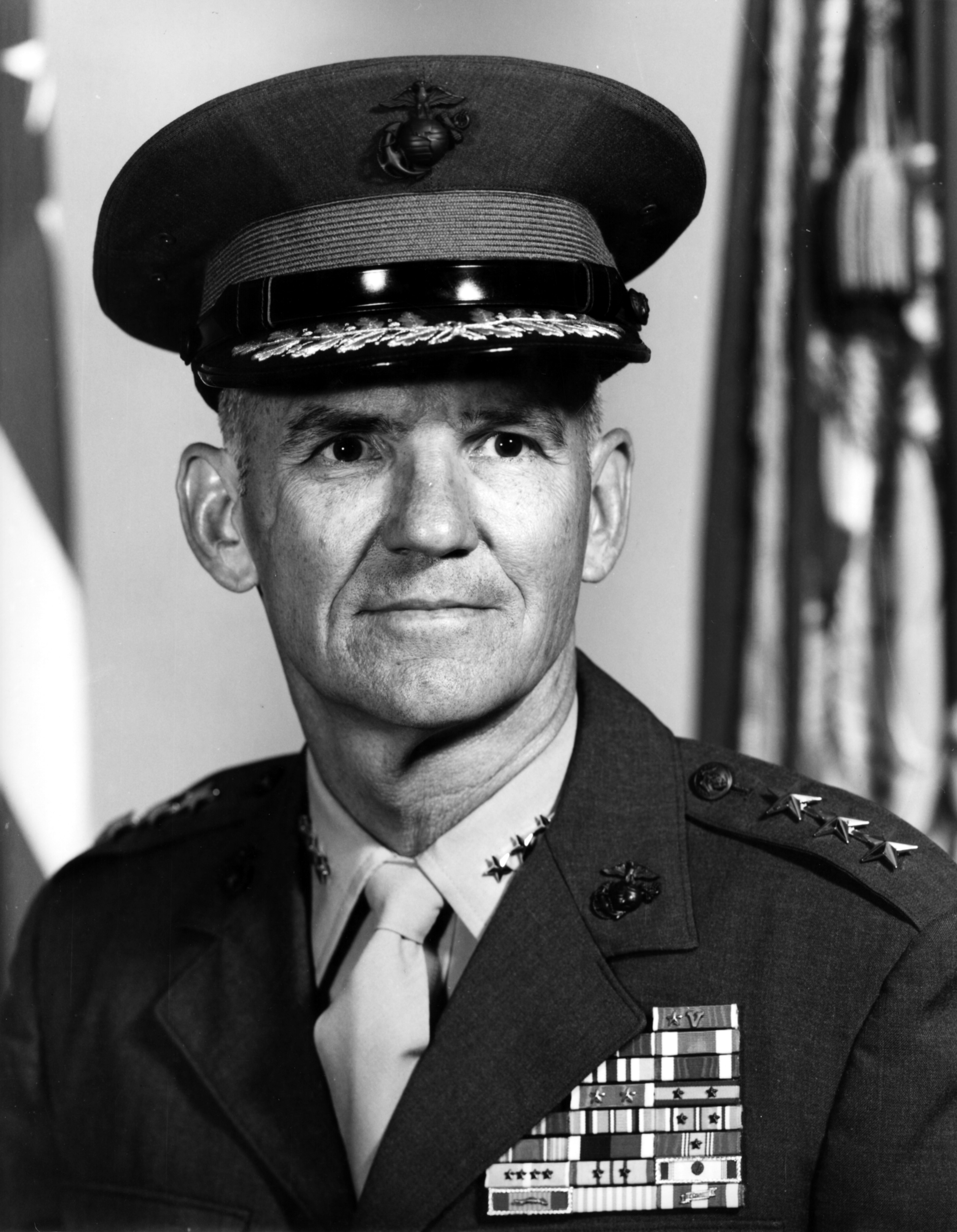
- LTG John H. Miller, USMC
- Born: April 16, 1925; San Angelo, Texas, U.S.
- Died: November 11, 2025 (aged 100); Bryan, Texas, U.S.
- Military career
- Allegiance: United States of America
- Branch: United States Marine Corps
- Service years: 1943–1946; 1949–1984
- Rank: Lieutenant General
- Commands: Fleet Marine Force, Atlantic; Develop. and Education Command; 2nd Force Service Support Group; 1st Battalion, 8th Marines
- Conflicts: World War II: Battle of Okinawa; Korean War: Battle of Chosin Reservoir; 1951 Counteroffensive; Battle of the Punchbowl; Vietnam War
- Awards: Navy Distinguished Service Medal; Legion of Merit (2); Bronze Star Medal (2); Purple Heart (3)

John Harrison Miller (April 16, 1925 – November 11, 2025) was a lieutenant general in the United States Marine Corps. A highly decorated veteran of World War II, Korea and Vietnam, Miller completed his career as commanding general, Fleet Marine Force, Atlantic.

== Early life and career ==
John H. Miller was born on April 16, 1925, in San Angelo, Texas, and graduated from the Axtell High School in June 1942. He then entered the Texas A&M University, where he was active in the football team and also was a member of the ROTC unit. Miller left the university in order to enlist in the Marine Corps Reserve in May 1943 and following the boot camp and service stateside, he took part in the Battle of Okinawa as a Radar Repair Technician in May 1945.

Following the War, Miller participated in the Occupation of Japan and returned to the United States with the rank of staff sergeant. He was released from active duty in April 1946 and returned to the Texas A&M University in order to complete his education. Miller graduated in May 1949 with a Bachelor of Science degree in electrical engineering. He married his high school love, Virginia Lee Campbell (December 20, 1924 – January 30, 2012) on August 31, 1947.

Miller decided to pursue a career in the Marines and was commissioned second lieutenant on June 3, 1949. He was subsequently ordered to the Basic School at Quantico, Virginia, for officer training, which he completed in June 1950. Miller then joined the 3rd Battalion, 1st Marines and embarked for Korea as commander of the light machine gun platoon in "I" Company. He led his unit during the combat operations in Chosin Reservoir and was promoted to first lieutenant in June 1951.

He subsequently participated in the 1951 Counteroffensive in May and in the Battle of the Punchbowl in September of that year and earned two Bronze Star Medals with Combat "V". He was wounded three times during his tour in Korea and received three Purple Hearts for each of his wounds.

Miller was ordered back to the United States in early 1952 and after brief leave home, he assumed duty as executive officer, Naval Ammunition Depot, McAlester, Oklahoma. He remained in that capacity until March 1953, when he was transferred to the 1st Provisional Marine Guided Missile Battalion at Naval Air Weapons Station China Lake, California and promoted to captain in July of that year.

He served as assistant operations officer of the battalion until July 1954, when he was ordered to the Naval Postgraduate School in Monterey, California, where he graduated in July 1957 with Master of Science degree in electronics engineering.

Miller then returned to the China Lake and assumed duty as executive officer, Marine Corps Guided Missile Test Unit. He was promoted to major in January 1959 and was transferred to the Headquarters Marine Corps in July of that year. Miller served as Guidance Missile/Ordnance Officer in the Logistics Division until July 1962, when he was ordered to Camp Pendleton, California for duty as executive officer, Materiel Supply and Maintenance Battalion, 1st Force Service Regiment.

In September 1963, Miller departed for Okinawa, Japan, where he assumed duty as Operations officer (S-3), 1st Battalion, 3rd Marines, 3rd Marine Division. He remained there until October 1964, when he was transferred to Hawaii, where he joined the headquarters, Fleet Marine Force, Pacific under famous lieutenant general Victor H. Krulak as Plans Officer in logistics section. While in this capacity, Miller was promoted to lieutenant colonel in July 1965.

He was ordered back to the continental United States in August 1967 and served as commanding officer, 1st Battalion, 8th Marines, 2nd Marine Division at Camp Lejeune, North Carolina until July 1968, when he was sent to the Army War College at Carlisle Barracks, Pennsylvania.

== Vietnam War ==
Miller graduated in June 1969 and departed for South Vietnam thereafter. He assumed command of Headquarters and Service Battalion, 1st Force Service Regiment, Force Logistics Command under Brigadier General James A. Feeley Jr. This command, stationed in Da Nang, served as the main logistics support component for the III Marine Amphibious Force and included Medical, Dental, Engineer, Supply, Maintenance and Military Police Battalions.

As the commanding officer of Headquarters and Service Battalion, Miller ran the day-to-day operations within the headquarters of Force Logistics Command (FLC) and coordinated the work of personnel, intelligence, operations, logistics and communications sections of the FLC. He held that command until the beginning of December 1969 and received the Legion of Merit with Combat "V" for his service with FLC.

He was subsequently ordered to Okinawa, where he assumed duty as chief of staff, Marine Corps Base Camp Butler under future Commandant, Robert H. Barrow. Miller was promoted to colonel in January 1970 and served on Okinawa until the end of 1972. He was decorated with second Legion of Merit for his service at Camp Butler in connections with support operations during the later phase of Vietnam War.

== General's duty ==
Upon his return to the United States, Miller was appointed deputy director of development, Office of the Chief of Research and Development, Department of the Army in Washington, D.C., and remained in that capacity until his promotion to brigadier general on July 2, 1974. He received the Meritorious Service and Joint Service Commendation Medals for his service in the Department of the Army.

His first general's billet was in the capacity of deputy commander, Fleet Marine Force, Atlantic (FMFLANT) with headquarters at Naval Station Norfolk, Virginia. Miller served as deputy to Lieutenant General Robert L. Nichols and was co-responsible for the Marine landing force that was spread across the Atlantic Ocean and on the East Coast of the United States.

In May 1975, Miller was appointed commanding general, Force Troops, Fleet Marine Force, Atlantic at Camp Lejeune, North Carolina and commanded all independent units under FMFLANT such as support artillery units, antiaircraft artillery units, military police battalions, separate engineer units and other miscellaneous force units. Since February 1976, he also held additional duty as Commander 2nd Force Service Support Group, Atlantic.

Miller was promoted to major general on May 3, 1976, and transferred to the Headquarters Marine Corps, where he served as deputy chief of staff for operations and training until May 1978. He was then transferred to the Marine Corps Base Quantico, where he succeeded Joseph C. Fegan Jr. as commanding general, Marine Corps Development and Education Command.

While in this capacity, Miller held the responsibility for several training facilities (The Basic School, Officer Candidates School, Marine Corps Command and Staff College and others) and oversaw the Marine Corps Officer training until October 1, 1980. While at Quantico, he was promoted to lieutenant general on June 13, 1979.

Miller was then transferred to the Headquarters Marine Corps and served under his old superior, now Commandant of the Marine Corps, Robert H. Barrow as deputy chief of staff for plans, policies and operations. He assumed his final assignment in July 1982, when he relieved Adolph G. Schwenk as commanding general, Fleet Marine Force, Atlantic.

While in this capacity, Miller held additional duty as commanding general, II Marine Amphibious Force and retired from the Marine Corps after 38 years of active service on September 1, 1984. He was decorated with the Navy Distinguished Service Medal during his retirement ceremony.

== Retirement and death ==
Following the retirement from the Marine Corps, Miller settled in College Station, Texas, and was active in the Marine Corps Historical Foundation. He also helped his granddaughters with their Cat Spring Yaupon Tea business strategy. His wife Virginia died of cancer on January 30, 2012, at the age of 87. They had three children: John H. Jr., Danny and daughter Melissa.

Miller was inducted into Texas A&M University Corps of Cadets Hall of Honor in 2019. He died in Bryan, Texas on November 11, 2025, at the age of 100.

== Decorations ==
A complete list of the general's medals and decorations include:

1st Row	Navy Distinguished Service Medal	Legion of Merit with Combat "V" and one 5/16" Gold Star	Bronze Star Medal with Combat "V" and one 5/16" Gold Star	Meritorious Service Medal
2nd Row	Joint Service Commendation Medal	Navy Commendation Medal	Purple Heart two 5/16" Gold Stars	Navy Presidential Unit Citation with two stars
3rd Row	Navy Meritorious Unit Commendation	American Campaign Medal	Asiatic-Pacific Campaign Medal with two 3/16 inch bronze service stars	World War II Victory Medal
4th Row	Navy Occupation Service Medal	National Defense Service Medal with one star	Korean Service Medal with four 3/16 inch silver service stars	Vietnam Service Medal with two 3/16 inch bronze service stars
5th Row	Republic of Korea Presidential Unit Citation	Vietnam Gallantry Cross Unit Citation	United Nations Korea Medal	Vietnam Campaign Medal

== See also ==
- 2nd Force Service Support Group

Military offices
Preceded by Joseph C. Fegan Jr.	Commanding General, Marine Corps Development and Education Command; 1978–1980	Succeeded by Bernard E. Trainor
Preceded by ???	Deputy Chief of Staff for Plans, Policies, and Operations of the United States Marine Corps; 1980–1982	Succeeded by William R. Maloney
Preceded by Adolph G. Schwenk	Commanding General, Fleet Marine Force, Atlantic; Commanding General, Fleet Marine Force, Europe; Commander, II Marine Expeditionary Force; 1982–1984	Succeeded by Alfred M. Gray Jr.
