= Jo Giæver Tenfjord =

Norwegian librarian, educator, children's writer and translator

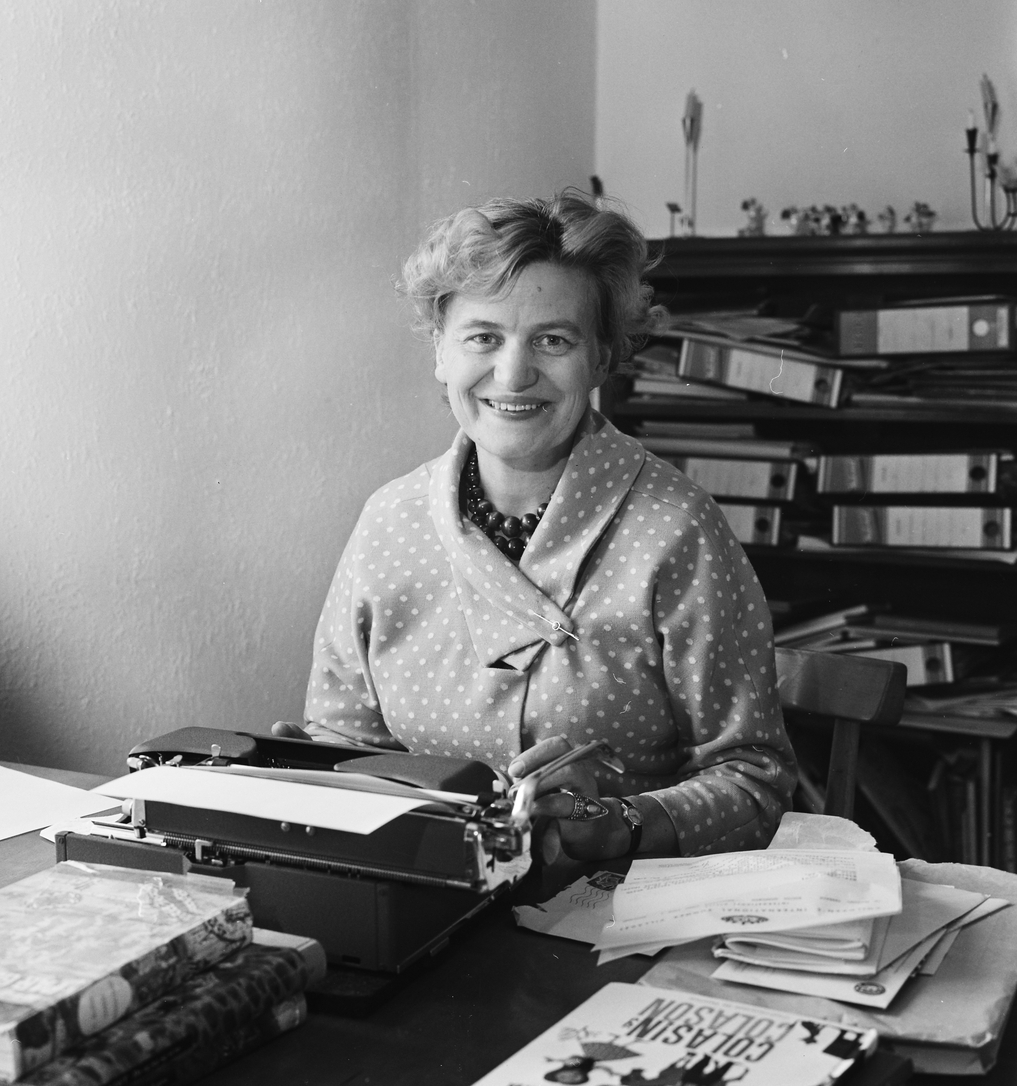
Jo Giæver Tenfjord in 1964

Johanne Giæver Tenfjord (13 August 1918 – 12 June 2007) was a Norwegian librarian, educator, children's writer and translator.

== Personal life ==
She was born in Kristiania (now Oslo), Norway. She was the daughter of Harald Birger Giæver (1873–1943) and Rut Berger (1893–1959). Her brother was publisher Knut T. Giæver. Tenfjord graduated artium at Oslo Cathedral School in 1938 and graduated from the State Library School (Statens bibliotekskole) in 1940.

== Career ==
Tenfjord worked in the period 1940–47 as a librarian at the Deichmanske library, the main branch of the Oslo Public Library. From 1950 she was a teacher at the State Library School. She chaired the Broadcasting Council from 1974 to 1982.

She made her literary debut in 1941 with the girl's book Valsesommer. She edited several literary anthologies for children, including the ten-volume Mitt skattkammer from 1956 and the eight-volume Barndomslandet (1963–1965). She was awarded the Bastian Prize in 1993.
