= Urfjelldokka Valley =

Valley in Antarctica

Urfjelldokka Valley (73°50′S 4°45′W) is a broad ice-filled valley between Urfjell Cliffs and Skappelnabben Spur along the Kirwan Escarpment in Queen Maud Land. Mapped by Norwegian cartographers from surveys and air photos by Norwegian-British-Swedish Antarctic Expedition (NBSAE) (1949–52) and additional air photos (1958–59). Named in association with Urfjell Cliffs.
