= Axtell High School (Texas) =

Location
- 308 Ottawa St. Axtell, Texas 76624; United States; 31.65893°N 96.97330°W

Information
- School type: Public high school
- Motto: Aiming for Excellence
- School district: Axtell Independent School District
- Principal: Brandon Dieterich
- Staff: 27.00 (FTE)
- Grades: 9-12
- Enrollment: 216 (2023–2024)
- Student to teacher ratio: 8.00
- Colors: Red and White
- Athletics conference: UIL Class AA
- Mascot: Longhorn/Lady Longhorn
- Website: Axtell High School

Axtell High School is a public high school located in Axtell, Texas and classified as a 2A school by the UIL. It is part of the Axtell Independent School District which covers northeastern McLennan County. In 2015, the school was rated "Met Standard" by the Texas Education Agency.

== Athletics ==
The Axtell Longhorns compete in these sports -

Volleyball, Cross Country, Football, Powerlifting, Basketball, Golf, Tennis, Track, Softball, and Baseball.

== Notable alumni ==
- Van Hughes, professional football player
- John H. Miller, Marine Corps Lieutenant general
