= Krylen Hill =

Hill in Queen Maud Land, Antarctica

Krylen Hill (71°33′S 2°10′W) is a hill 5 nautical miles (9 km) southwest of Valken Hill, in the northern part of the Ahlmann Ridge in Queen Maud Land, Antarctica. It was mapped by Norwegian cartographers from surveys and air photos by the Norwegian–British–Swedish Antarctic Expedition (1949–52) and air photos by the Norwegian expedition (1958–59) and named Krylen (the hump).
