= Sandhøkalvane Nunataks =

Geomorphological features in the Antarctic

Sandhøkalvane Nunataks (71°46′S 9°55′E) is a group of nunataks located 4 nautical miles (7.4 km) northeast of Sandhø Heights, lying between the Conrad Mountains and Mount Dallmann in Queen Maud Land. They were discovered and photographed by the German Antarctic Expedition in 1938–39, and mapped by Norway from air photos and surveys by the Norwegian Antarctic Expedition, 1956–60, and named Sandhøkalvane ("the sand heights calves").
