= Valken Hill =

Hill of Antarctica

Valken Hill (71°29′S 1°59′W) is a hill 6 nautical miles (11 km) southwest of Marsteinen Nunatak in the north part of Ahlmann Ridge in Queen Maud Land. It was mapped by Norwegian cartographers from surveys and air photos by the Norwegian-British-Swedish Antarctic Expedition (NBSAE) (1949–52) and air photos by the Norwegian expedition (1958–59) and named Valken (the roll).
