= Sandneset Point =

Sandneset Point (71°39′S 9°33′E) is the northern point of Furdesanden Moraine in the Conrad Mountains of the Orvin Mountains, Queen Maud Land. It was discovered and photographed by the German Antarctic Expedition, 1938–39, mapped by Norway from surveys and air photos by Norwegian Antarctic Expedition, 1956–60, and named Sandneset (the sand point).
