= Bergen Nunataks =

Nunatak group in Palmer Land, Antarctica

The Bergen Nunataks (72°25′S 64°53′W) are a group of nunataks 14 nautical miles (26 km) north of the Journal Peaks in south-central Palmer Land. They were mapped by the United States Geological Survey from aerial photographs taken by the U.S. Navy, 1966–69, and named in 1977 by the Advisory Committee on Antarctic Names after Michael Bergen, a United States Antarctic Research Program engineer at Palmer Station, winter party 1970.
