= Båkeneset Headland =

Båkeneset Headland (71°23′S 2°48′W) is an ice-covered headland, marked by Båken Nunatak near the seaward end, forming the northwest extremity of Ahlmann Ridge in Queen Maud Land. It was mapped by Norwegian cartographers from surveys and from air photos by the Norwegian-British-Swedish Antarctic Expedition(1949–52), and from air photos by the Norwegian expedition (1958–59), and named "Båkeneset" (the "beacon cape"). It is also a boundary of the Krylvika Bight along the Fimbul Ice Shelf.
