= Glopeflya Plain =

Plain in Antarctica

Glopeflya Plain (72°7′S 10°25′E) is a narrow, ice-covered plain between the eastern part of the Orvin Mountains and the interior ice plateau which rises close southward, in Queen Maud Land, Antarctica. It was mapped by Norwegian cartographers from surveys and air photos by the Sixth Norwegian Antarctic Expedition (1956–60) and named Glopeflya (the ravine plateau).
