= Schytt Glacier =

Glacier in Antarctica

- Location of Queen Maud Land in Antarctica

- Location within Antarctica
- Location: Queen Maud Land
- Coordinates: 71°35′S 3°40′W
- Length: 60 nmi (111 km; 69 mi)
- Thickness: unknown
- Terminus: Princess Martha Coast
- Status: unknown

Schytt Glacier is a broad glacier about 60 miles (100 km) long, flowing northward between Giaever and Ahlmann Ridge in Queen Maud Land to the Jelbart Ice Shelf. Mapped by Norwegian cartographers from surveys and air photos by the Norwegian-British-Swedish Antarctic Expedition (NBSAE) (1949–1952) and named for Valter Schytt, second in command and glaciologist of NBSAE.

== See also ==
- List of glaciers in the Antarctic
- Glaciology
- List of Nunataks
- Valter Butte
