= Axtell, Texas =

Unincorporated community in eastern McLennan County, Texas, U.S.

Coordinates: 31°39′30″N 96°58′17″W

Location of Axtell in Texas

Axtell is an unincorporated community in eastern McLennan County, Texas, United States. It is part of the Waco Metropolitan Statistical Area. It is best known for being the site of the Mount Carmel Center, the site of the 1993 Waco Siege.

U.S. Census data is not readily available for the bedroom community of Axtell, but 2000 Census numbers show a population of 2,284 for ZIP Code Tabulation Area 76624, the U.S.Postal ZIP for Axtell.

The Axtell Independent School District serves area students. The school mascot is a Longhorn and school colors are red and white. The district has two campuses - an elementary school located on Longhorn Parkway and the junior and senior high school located at North 5th Street and Ottawa Street.

In 2010, Axtell was reclassified as a 2A school. The student population averages 200 students, often causing the district's classification to fluctuate between 1A and 2A.

== History ==
Axtell was established in the early 1880s as a rail stop along the historic Cotton Belt Route between Corsicana and Waco during the golden era of railroad expansion. The town was granted a post office in 1882 and named in honor of a railroad officer.

== Notable people ==
- David Koresh, American cult leader of the Branch Davidians
- John H. Miller, USMC
