= Horteriset Dome =

Horteriset Dome (72°5′S 12°22′E) is a broad ice-covered hill about 13 nautical miles (24 km) west of the southern part of the Weyprecht Mountains in Queen Maud Land, Antarctica. First photographed from the air by the Third German Antarctic Expedition (1938–39), it was mapped by Norwegian cartographers from surveys and air photos by the Sixth Norwegian Antarctic Expedition (1956–60) and named by them.
