= Giaever Ridge =

Ridge in Queen Maud Land, Antarctica

Coordinates: 72°S 5°W

Giaever Ridge is a broad, snow-covered ridge, about 70 nautical miles (130 km) long in a north–south direction, on the west side of Schytt Glacier in Queen Maud Land, Antarctica. It was mapped by Norwegian cartographers from surveys and air photos by the Norwegian–British–Swedish Antarctic Expedition (1949–52) and named for John Schjelderup Giæver, leader of the expedition.
