= Vince Nunatak =

Nunatak in Victoria Land, Antarctica

Vince Nunatak (77°30′S 163°22′E) is a nunatak of Antarctica.
