= Mount Mangin (Antarctica) =

Mountain in Graham Land, Antarctica

Coordinates: 67°25′S 68°26′W

Mount Mangin is a mountain, 2,040 metres (6,700 ft) high, standing 5 nautical miles (9 km) northeast of Mount Barre on Adelaide Island, Antarctica. It was discovered by the French Antarctic Expedition, 1908–10, and named by Jean-Baptiste Charcot for the noted French botanist Louis A. Mangin.
