= Mount Tidd =

Mountain in Ellsworth Land, Antarctica

Mount Tidd (81°17′S 85°13′W) is a prominent rock peak which is the highest summit in Pirrit Hills. The peak was positioned by the U.S. Ellsworth-Byrd Traverse Party on December 10, 1958. It was named by the Advisory Committee on Antarctic Names (US-ACAN) for Lieutenant Paul Tidd of the U.S. Navy, who was the Officer-in-Charge of Ellsworth Station in 1958.
