= Pirrit Hills =

Pirrit Hills (81°17′S 85°21′W) is an isolated group of rocky peaks and nunataks about 7 nautical miles (13 km) in extent, lying southward of the Ellsworth Mountains, between the Heritage Range and Nash Hills. The feature was positioned by the U.S. Ellsworth-Byrd Traverse Party in December 1958. It was named by the Advisory Committee on Antarctic Names (US-ACAN) for John Pirrit, a glaciologist with the traverse party who had wintered at Ellsworth Station. Pirrit was scientific leader at Byrd Station in 1959.

== See also ==
- Mount Goodwin, second most prominent summit in Pirrit Hills
- Mountains in Antarctica
- Mount Turcotte
