= List of churches in Jammerbugt Municipality =

This list of churches in Jammerbugt Municipality lists church buildings in Jammerbugt Municipality, Denmark.

== National Churches ==
=== Aaby Church ===
Aaby Church
- Aaby Kirke
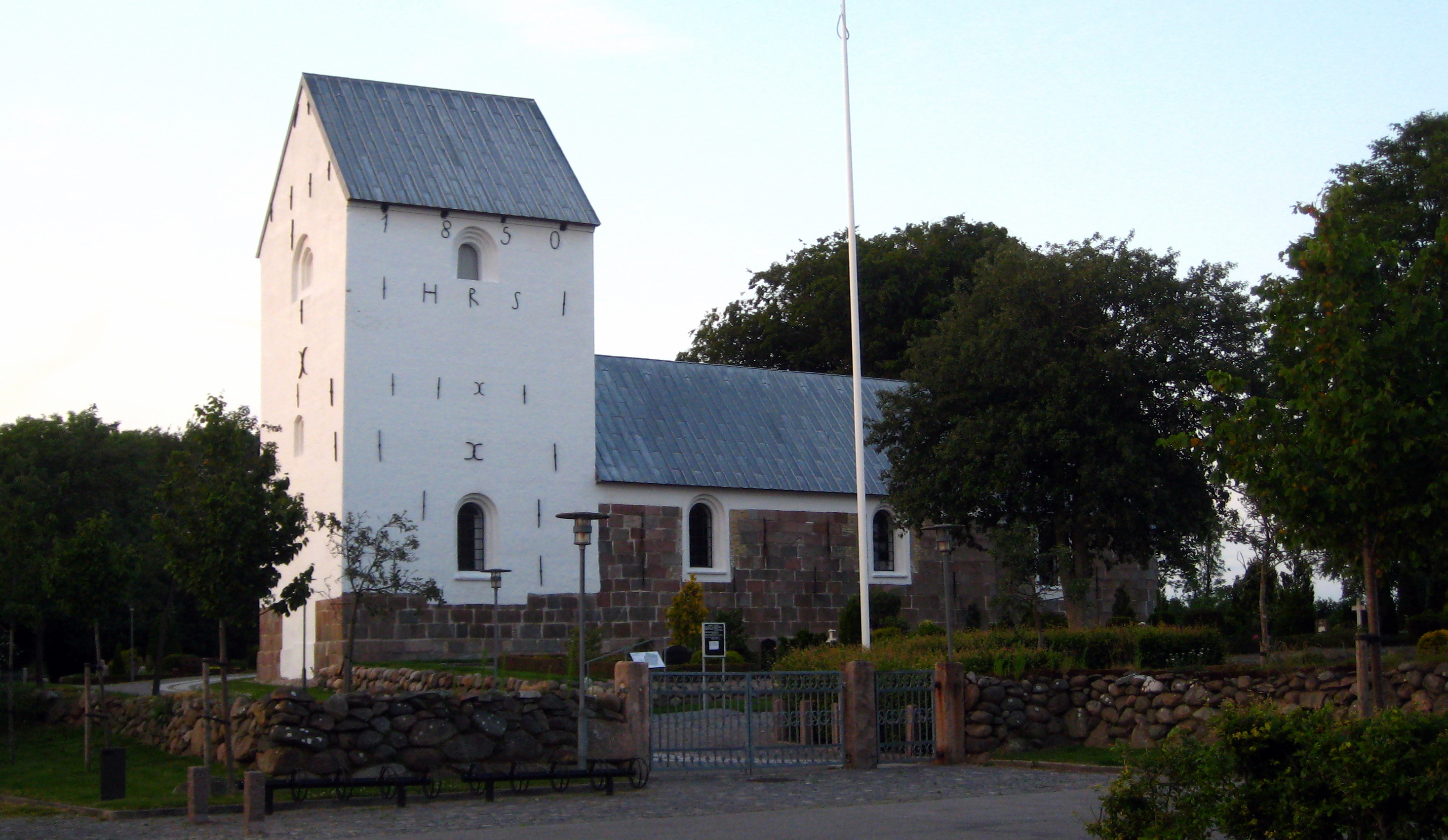
- Aaby Church
- 57°10′0.98″N 9°44′30.21″E
- Location: Aabybro, Denmark
- Denomination: Church of Denmark

History
- Founded: 1100s

Administration
- Diocese: Diocese of Aalborg
- Deanery: Jammerbugt Provsti
- Parish: Aaby Parish

Aaby Church is located in Aabybro. It is the only national church in Aaby Parish. The church has a churchyard with a cemetery.

The church was built in the 1100s.

=== Alstrup Church ===
Alstrup Church
- Alstrup Kirke
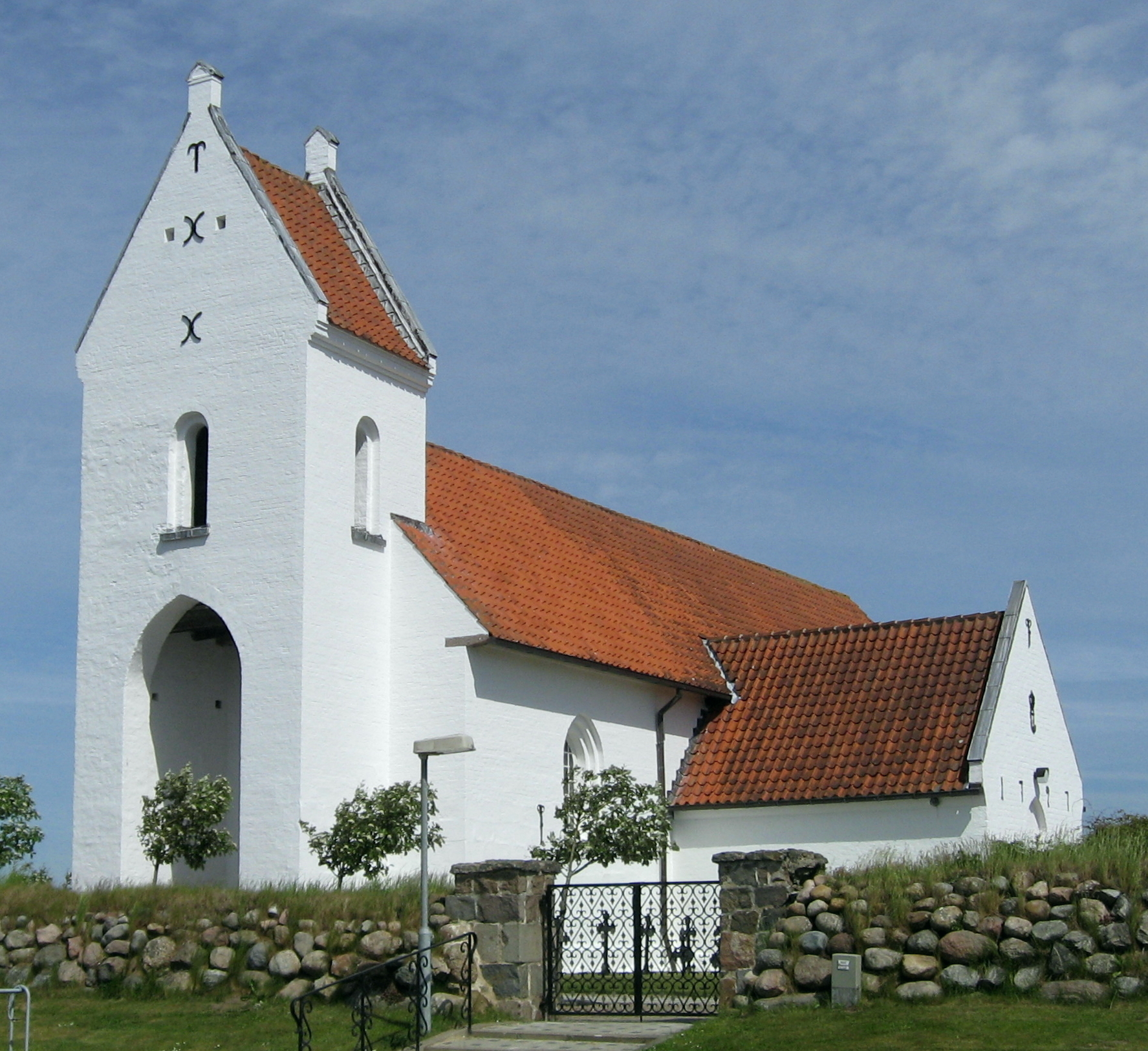
- Alstrup Church
- 57°16′37.95″N 9°45′16.47″E
- Location: Alstrup, Denmark
- Denomination: Church of Denmark

History
- Founded: Ca. 1200

Specifications
- Capacity: 100

Administration
- Diocese: Diocese of Aalborg
- Deanery: Jammerbugt Provsti
- Parish: Alstrup Parish

Alstrup Church is located in Alstrup. It is the only national church in Alstrup Parish. The church has a churchyard with a cemetery.

The church was built around year 1200.

The pulpit is from the 1700s. It depicts the symbols of the Four Evangelists.

=== Bejstrup Church ===
Bejstrup Church
- Bejstrup Kirke
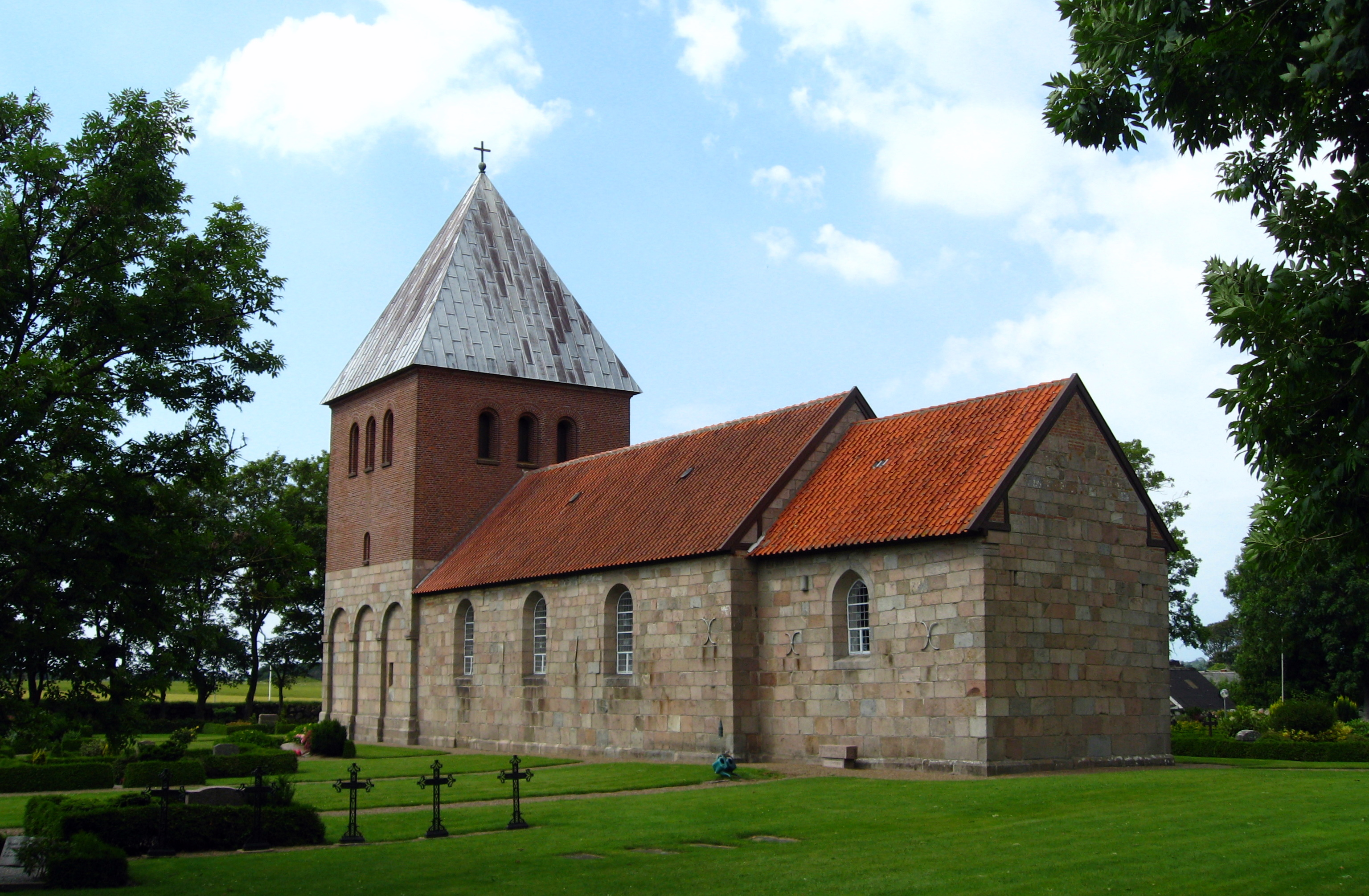
- Bejstrup Church
- 57°1′52.18″N 9°19′47.29″E
- Location: Bejstrup, Denmark
- Denomination: Church of Denmark

History
- Founded: 1100s

Administration
- Diocese: Diocese of Aalborg
- Deanery: Jammerbugt Provsti
- Parish: Bejstrup Parish

Bejstrup Church is located in Bejstrup. It is the only national church in Bejstrup Parish. The church has a churchyard with a cemetery.

The church was built in the 1100s. The current church tower is from 1874, having replaced an older tower.

The pulpit is from 1584 and the altar piece is from the late 1500s.

=== Biersted Church ===
Biersted Church
- Biersted Kirke
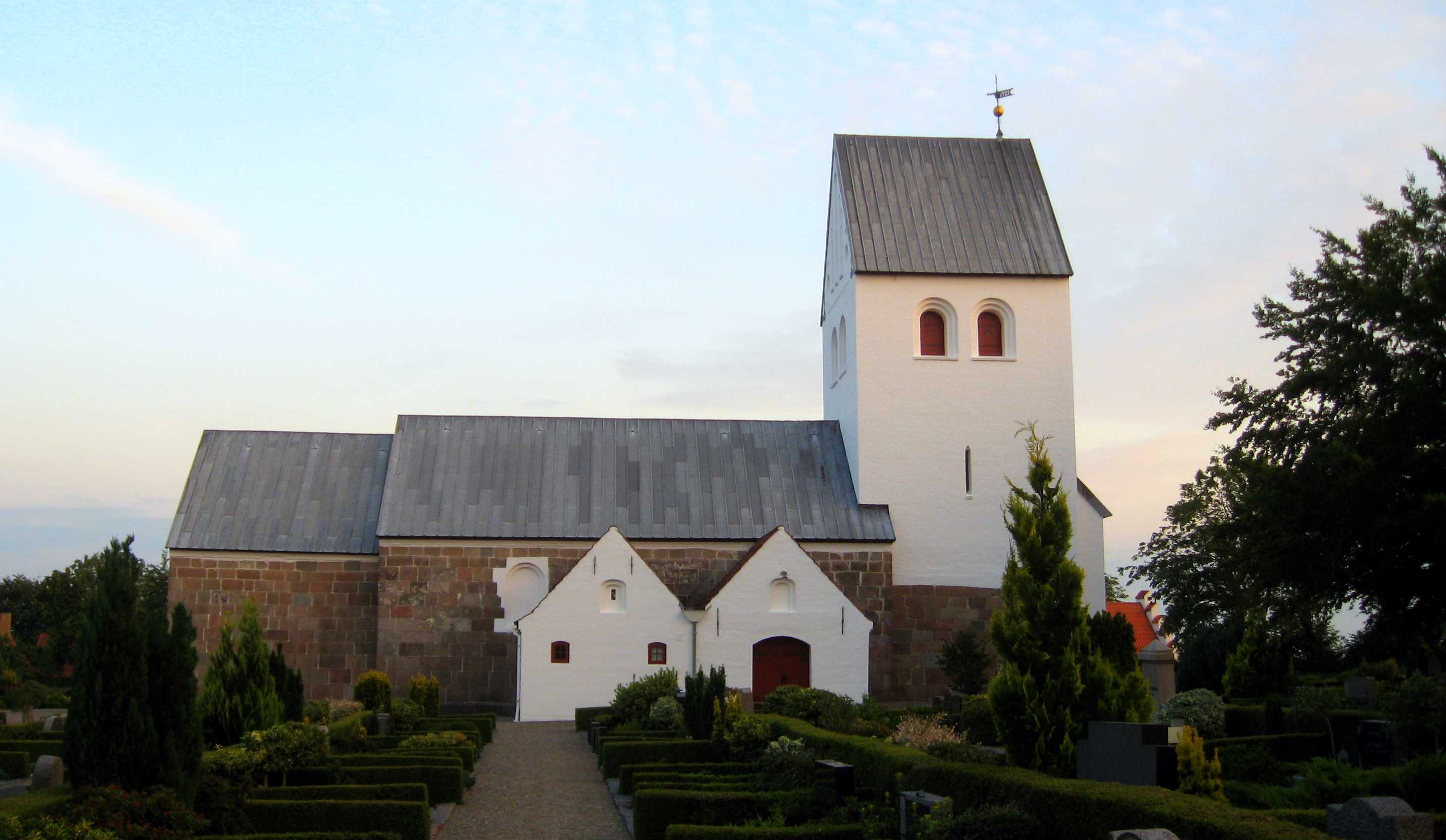
- Biersted Church
- 57°9′21.26″N 9°49′18.76″E
- Denomination: Church of Denmark

Administration
- Diocese: Diocese of Aalborg
- Deanery: Jammerbugt Provsti
- Parish: Biersted Parish

Biersted Church is located approximately 700 meters east of Biersted. It is the only national church in Biersted Parish. The church has a churchyard with a cemetery.

=== Brovst Church ===
Brovst Church
- Brovst Kirke
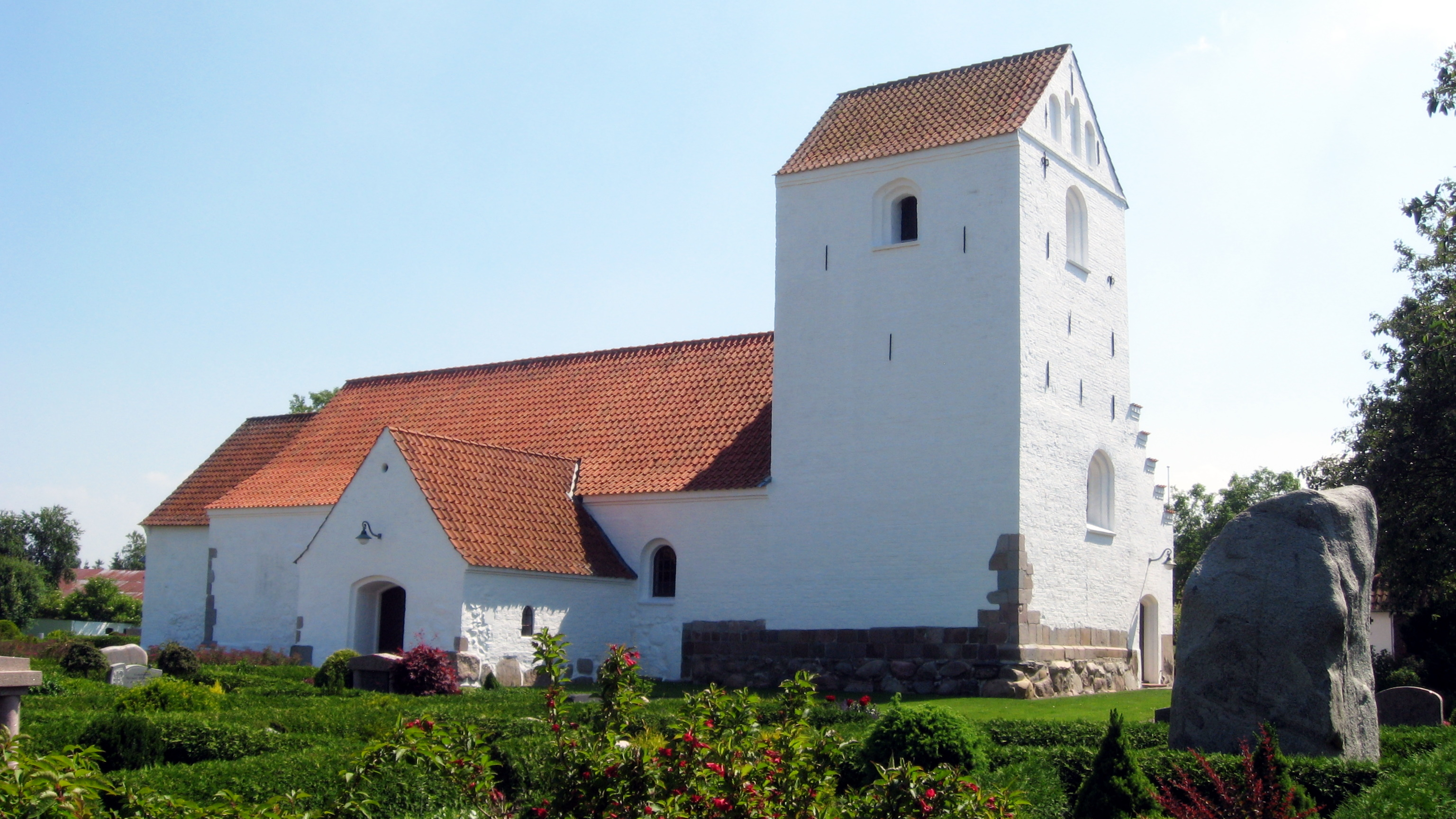
- Brovst Church
- 57°5′21.16″N 9°31′41.31″E
- Location: Brovst, Denmark
- Denomination: Church of Denmark

Administration
- Diocese: Diocese of Aalborg
- Deanery: Jammerbugt Provsti
- Parish: Brovst Parish

Brovst Church is located in Brovst. It is the only national church in Brovst Parish. The church has a churchyard with a cemetery.

=== Fjerritslev Church ===
Fjerritslev Church
- Fjerritslev Kirke
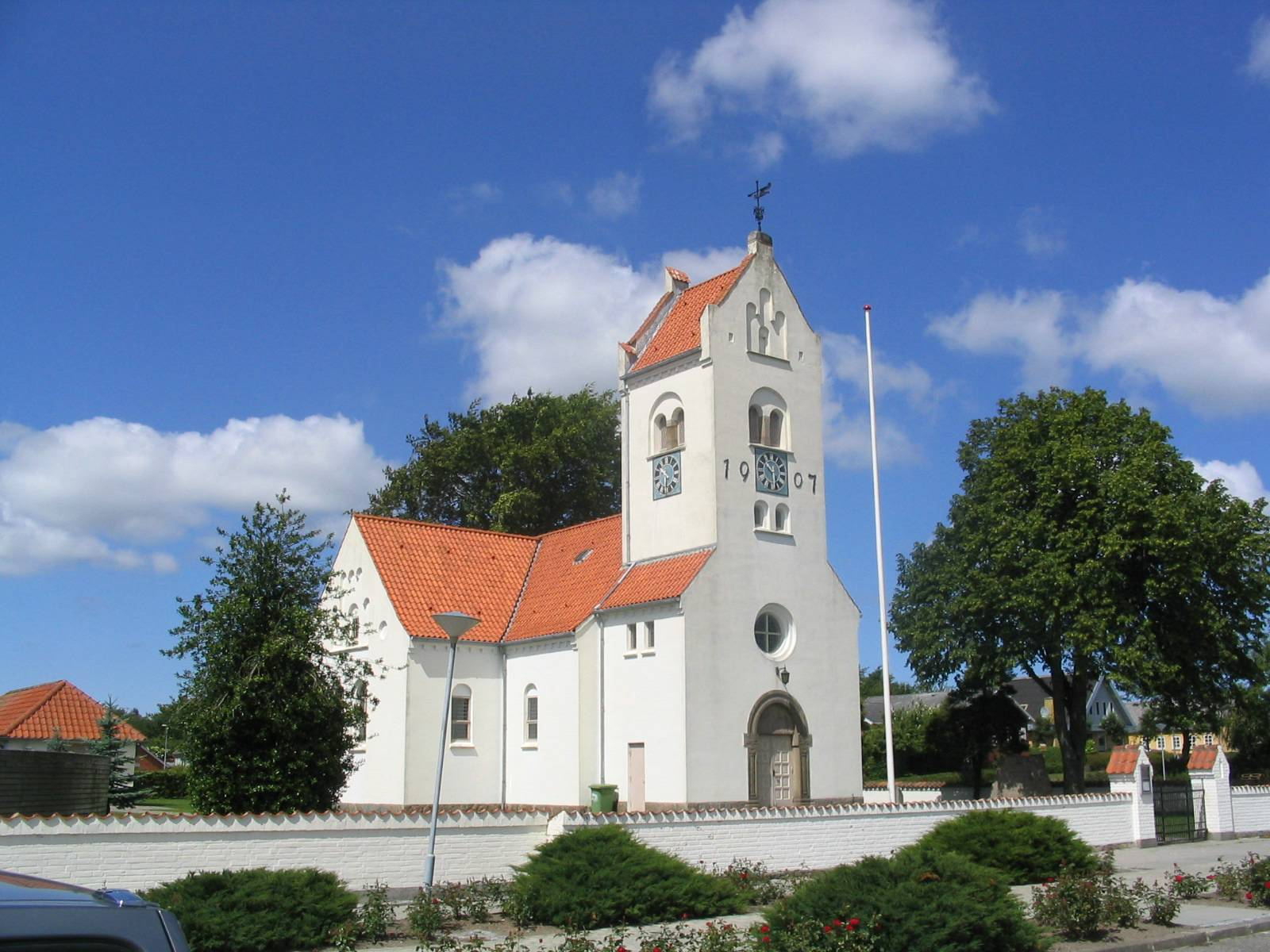
- Fjerritslev Church
- 57°5′20.16″N 9°15′47.34″E
- Location: Fjerritslev, Denmark
- Denomination: Church of Denmark

Architecture
- Completed: 22 December, 1907

Administration
- Diocese: Diocese of Aalborg
- Deanery: Jammerbugt Provsti
- Parish: Kollerup-Fjerritslev Parish

Fjerritslev Church is located in Fjerritslev. It is one of two national churches in Kollerup-Fjerritslev Parish.

The church was constructed in 1907 and first opened on 22 December 1907. It was built by architect Kristoffer Nyrop Varming.

The altarpiece is made by Johannes Wilhjelm and the baptismal font by Anders Bundgaard.

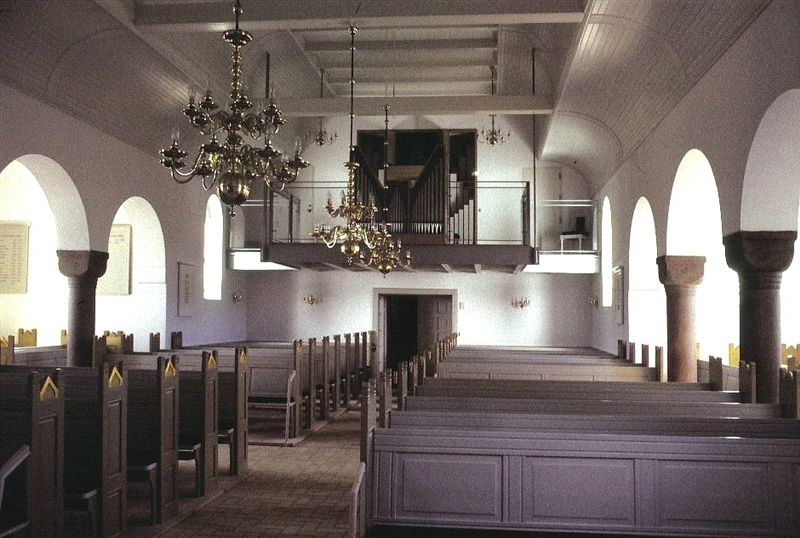
Church interior

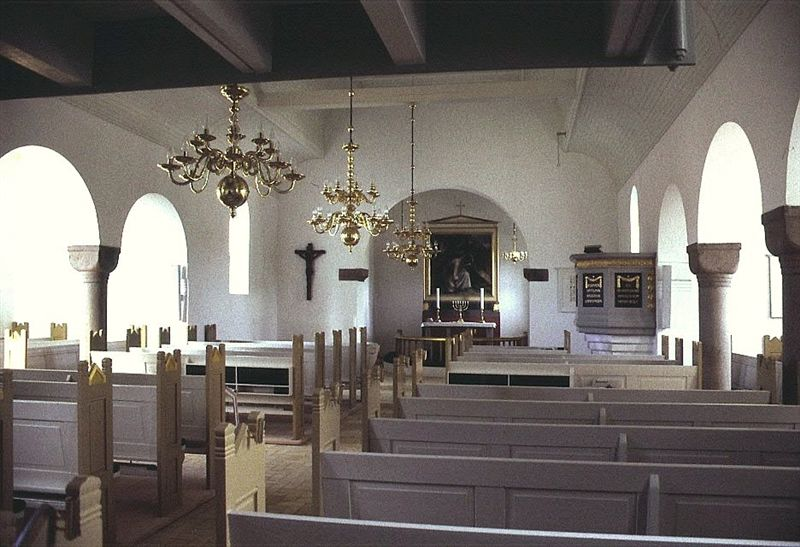
Church interior

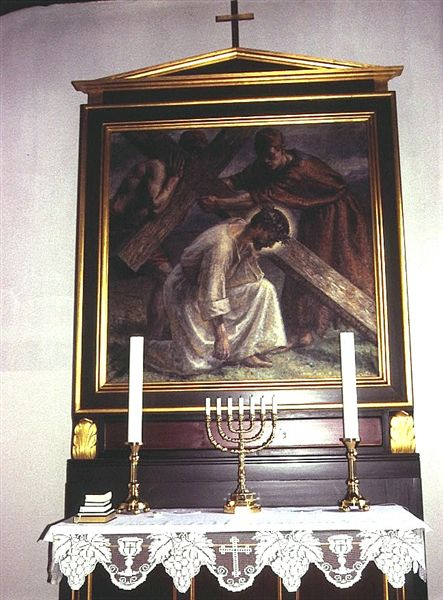
Altarpiece

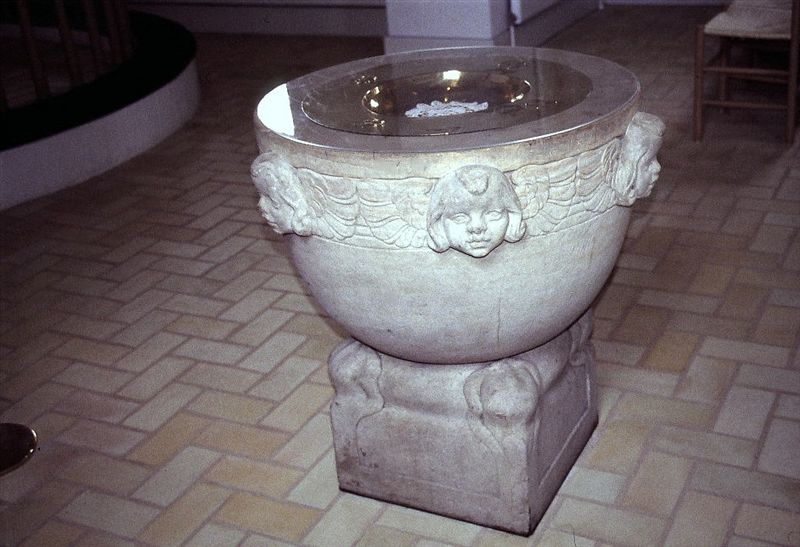
Baptismal font

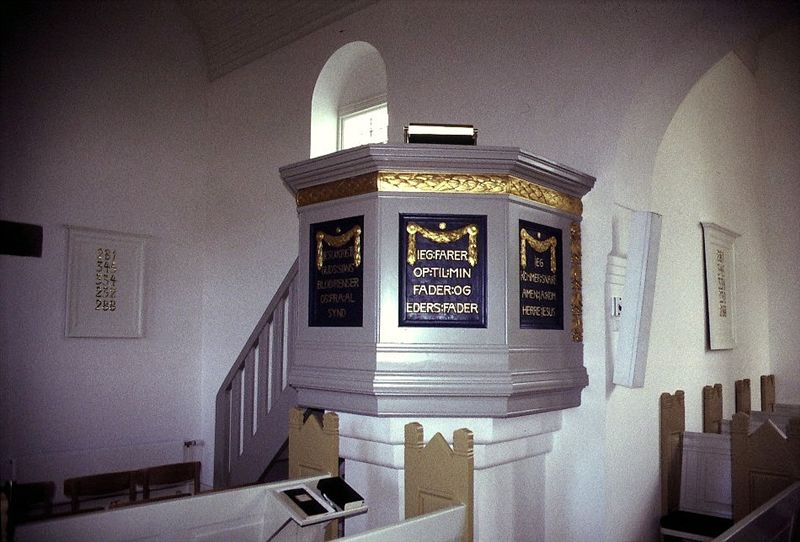
Pulpit

=== Gjøl Church ===
Gjøl Church
- Gjøl Kirke
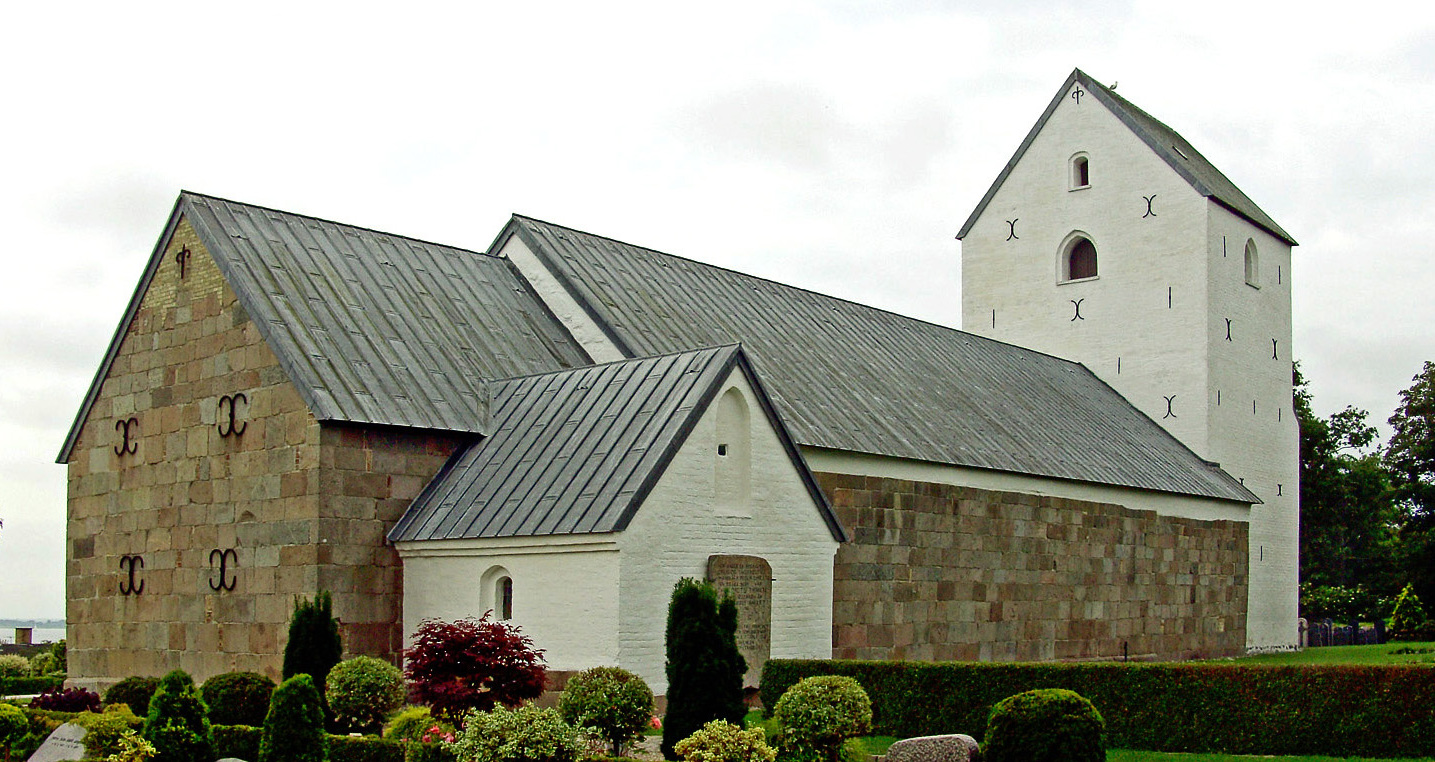
- Gjøl Church
- 57°4′11.77″N 9°43′10.47″E
- Location: Gjøl, Denmark
- Denomination: Church of Denmark

Architecture
- Completed: Ca. 1130

Specifications
- Capacity: 260

Administration
- Diocese: Diocese of Aalborg
- Deanery: Jammerbugt Provsti
- Parish: Gjøl Parish

Gjøl Church is located in Gjøl. It is the only national church in Gjøl Parish. The church has a churchyard with a cemetery.

The church was constructed around year 1130. The church was expanded in 1450 and the church porch was built around year 1873.

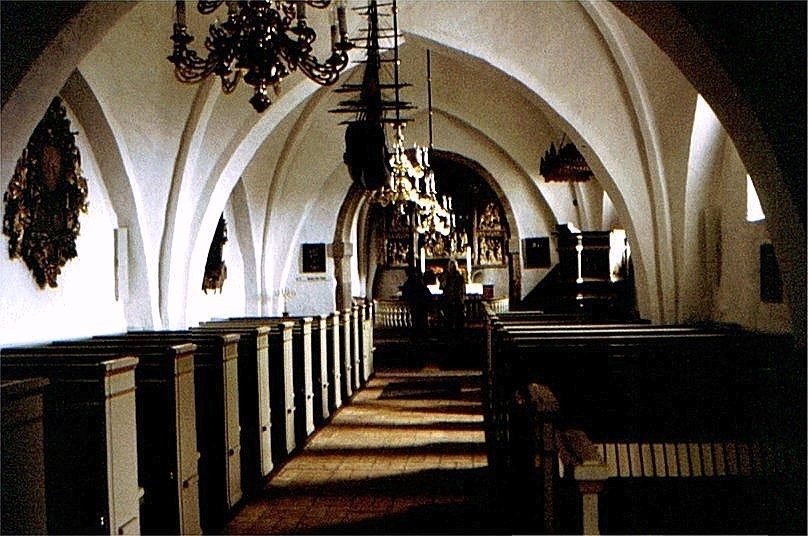
Church interior

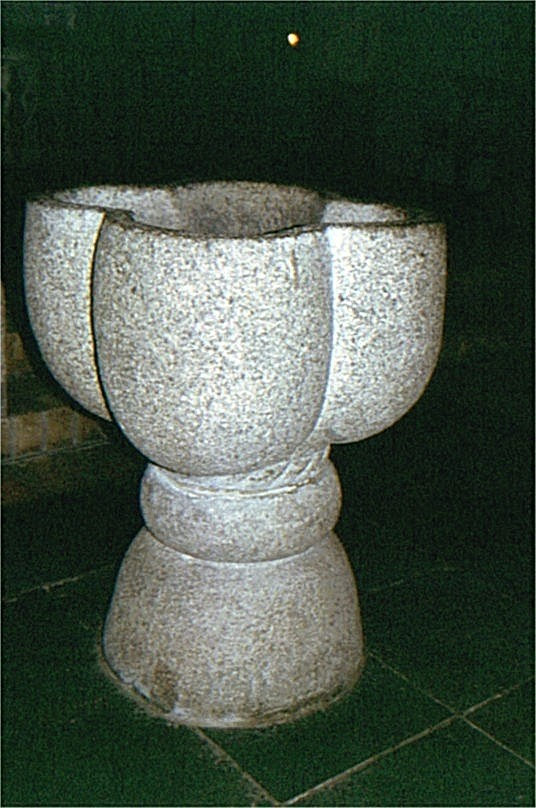
Baptismal font

=== Gøttrup Church ===
Gøttrup Church
- Gøttrup Kirke
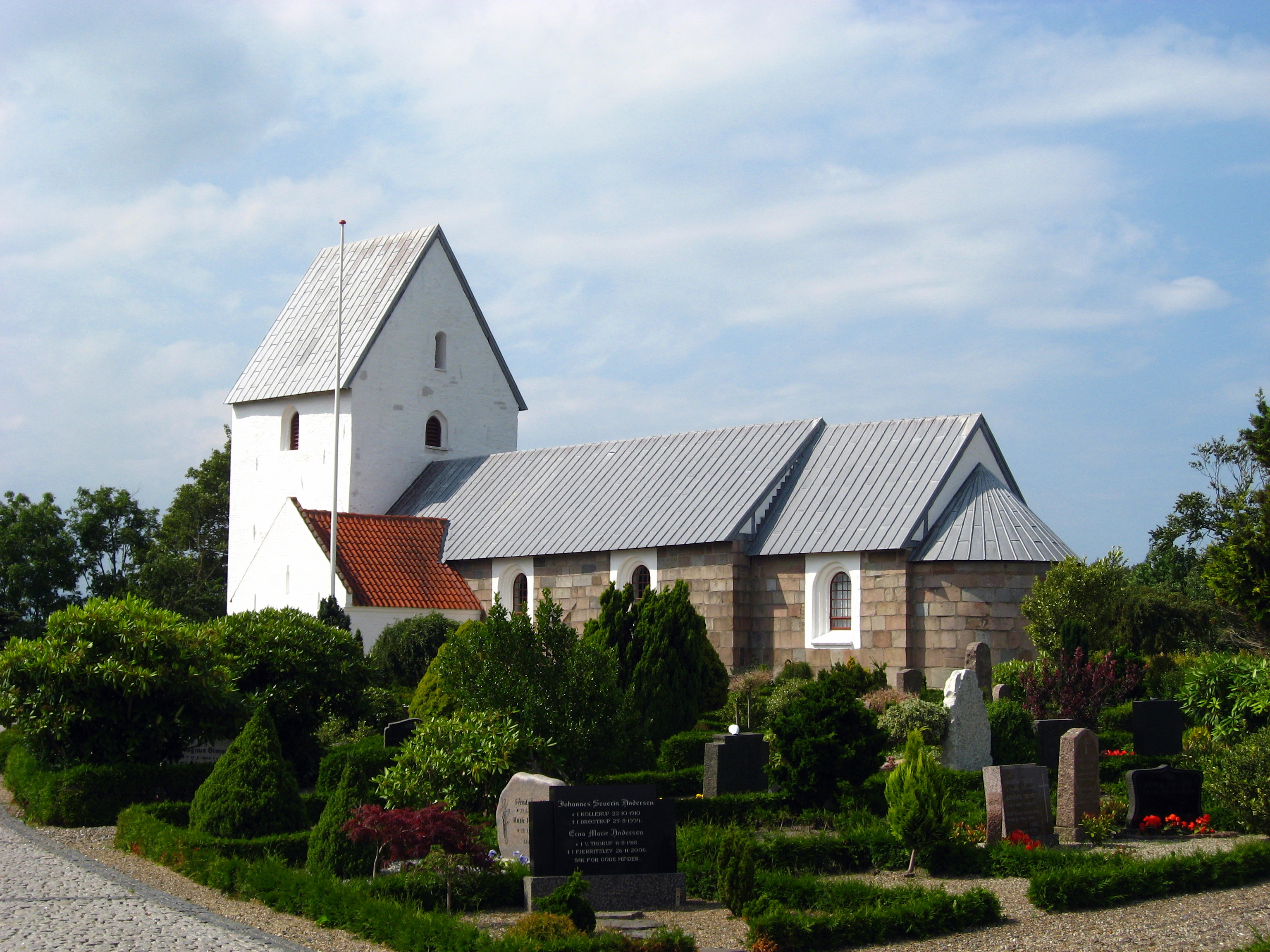
- Gøttrup Church
- 57°3′30.12″N 9°12′42.99″E
- Location: Gøttrup, Denmark
- Denomination: Church of Denmark

History
- Founded: 11th century

Administration
- Diocese: Diocese of Aalborg
- Deanery: Jammerbugt Provsti
- Parish: Gøttrup Parish

Gøttrup Church is located in Gøttrup. It is the only national church in Gøttrup Parish. The church has a churchyard with a cemetery. The nave and the apse of the church was built in the eleventh century and it as was consecrated by St. Laurentius. The bell in the church has the inscription “Hail the Star of the Sea, Jesus the Nazarene, the Jews’ King, St. Laurentius”.

The altarpiece is from 1585. The pulpit is from 1579. The bell is from around 1500 and was made by Albert Poulsen.

=== Haverslev Church ===
Haverslev Church
- Haverslev Kirke
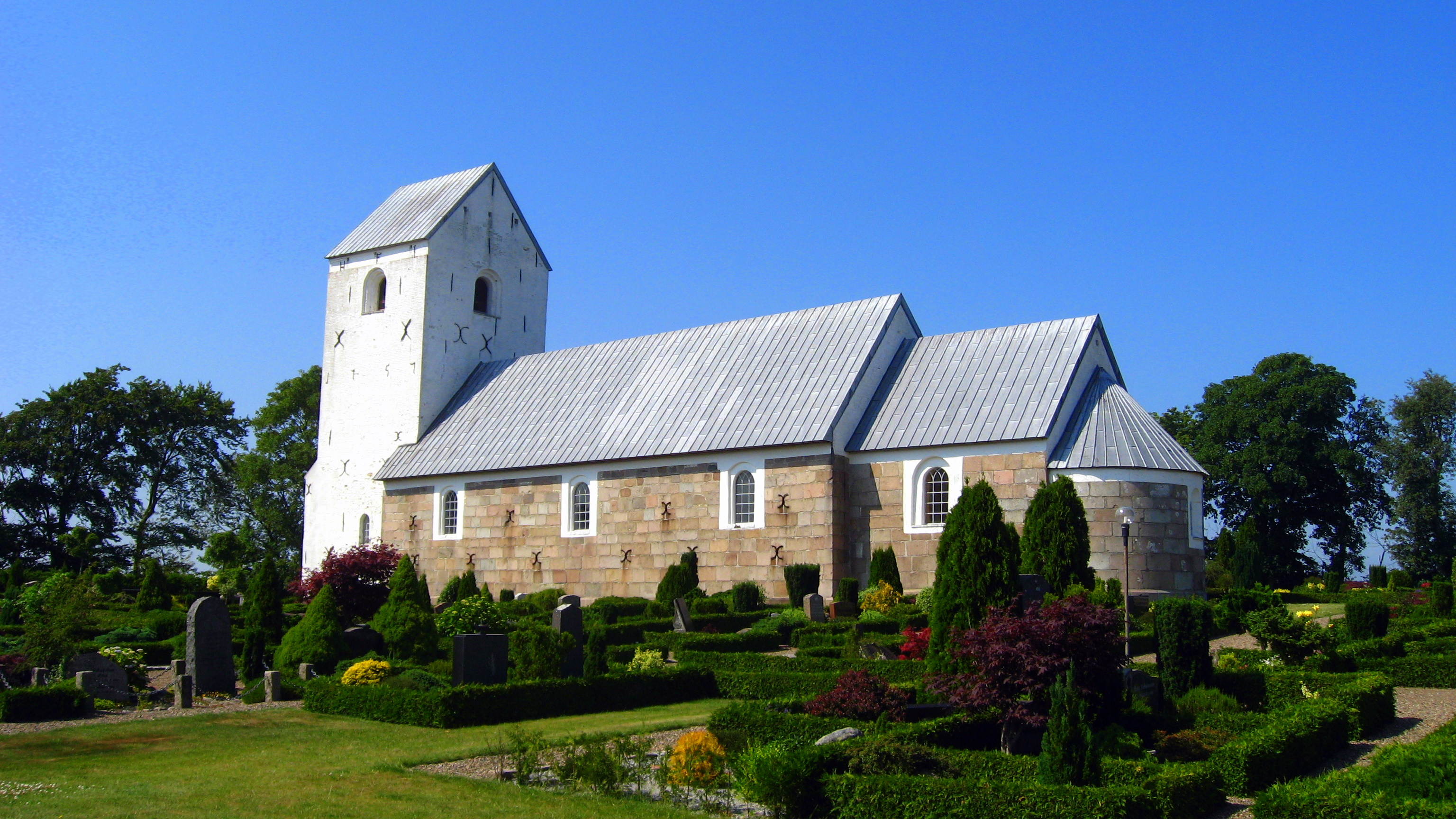
- Haverslev Church
- 57°3′6.52″N 9°22′39.01″E
- Denomination: Church of Denmark

Administration
- Diocese: Diocese of Aalborg
- Deanery: Jammerbugt Provsti
- Parish: Haverslev Parish

Haverslev Church is located 1 km north of Haverslev. It is the only national church in Haverslev Parish. The church has a churchyard with a cemetery.

=== Hjortdal Church ===
Hjortdal Church
- Hjortdal Kirke
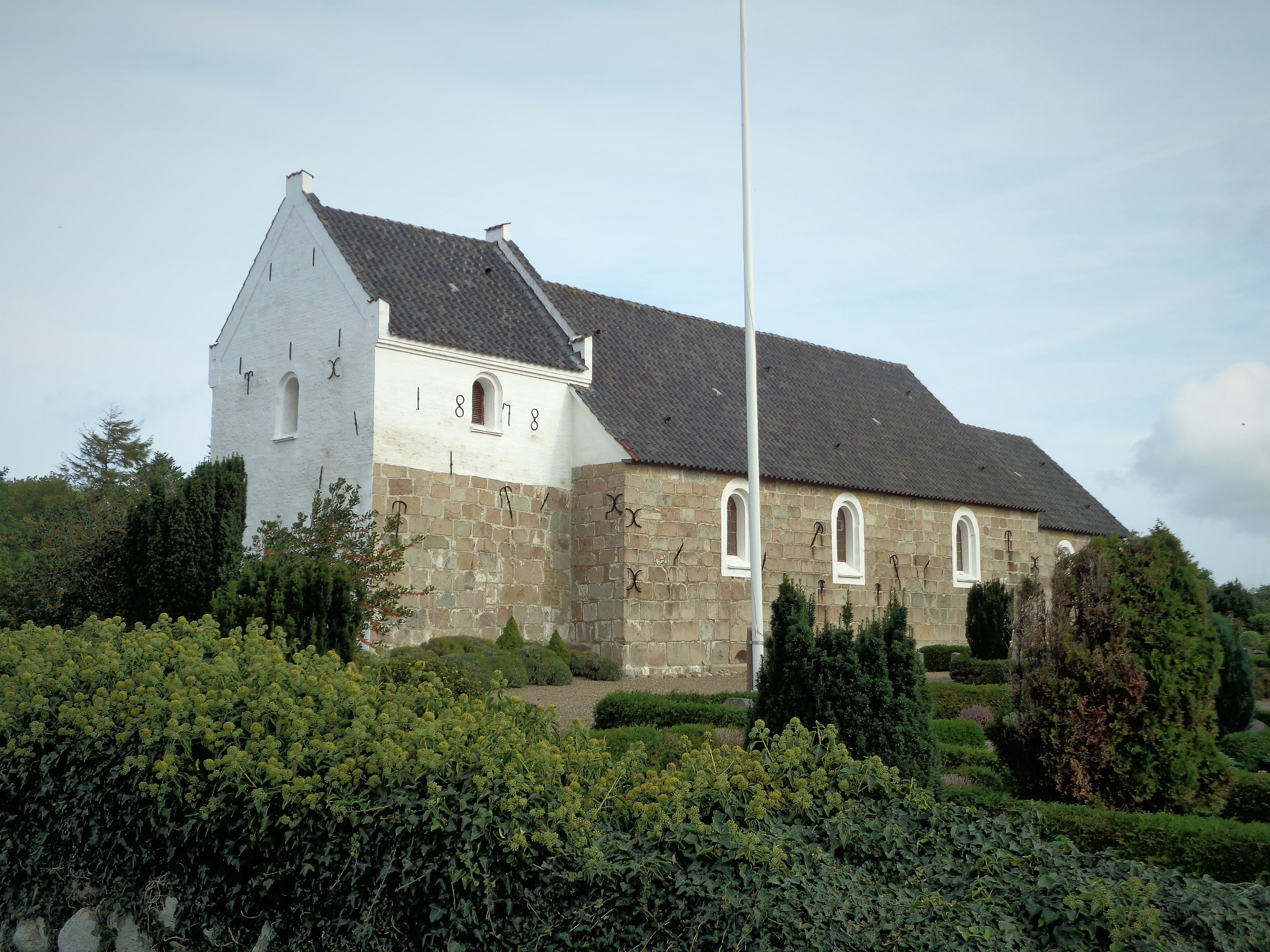
- Hjortdal Church
- 57°8′7.02″N 9°20′40.18″E
- Denomination: Church of Denmark

Architecture
- Completed: 1100s

Administration
- Diocese: Diocese of Aalborg
- Deanery: Jammerbugt Provsti
- Parish: Hjortdal Parish

Hjortdal Church is located around 400 meters west of Hjortdal. It is the only national church in Hjortdal Parish. The church has a churchyard with a cemetery.

The church was built in the 1100s. The church porch was built in 1586.

The altarpiece is from 1942. The pulpit is from 1592.

=== Hune Church ===
Hune Church
- Hune Kirke
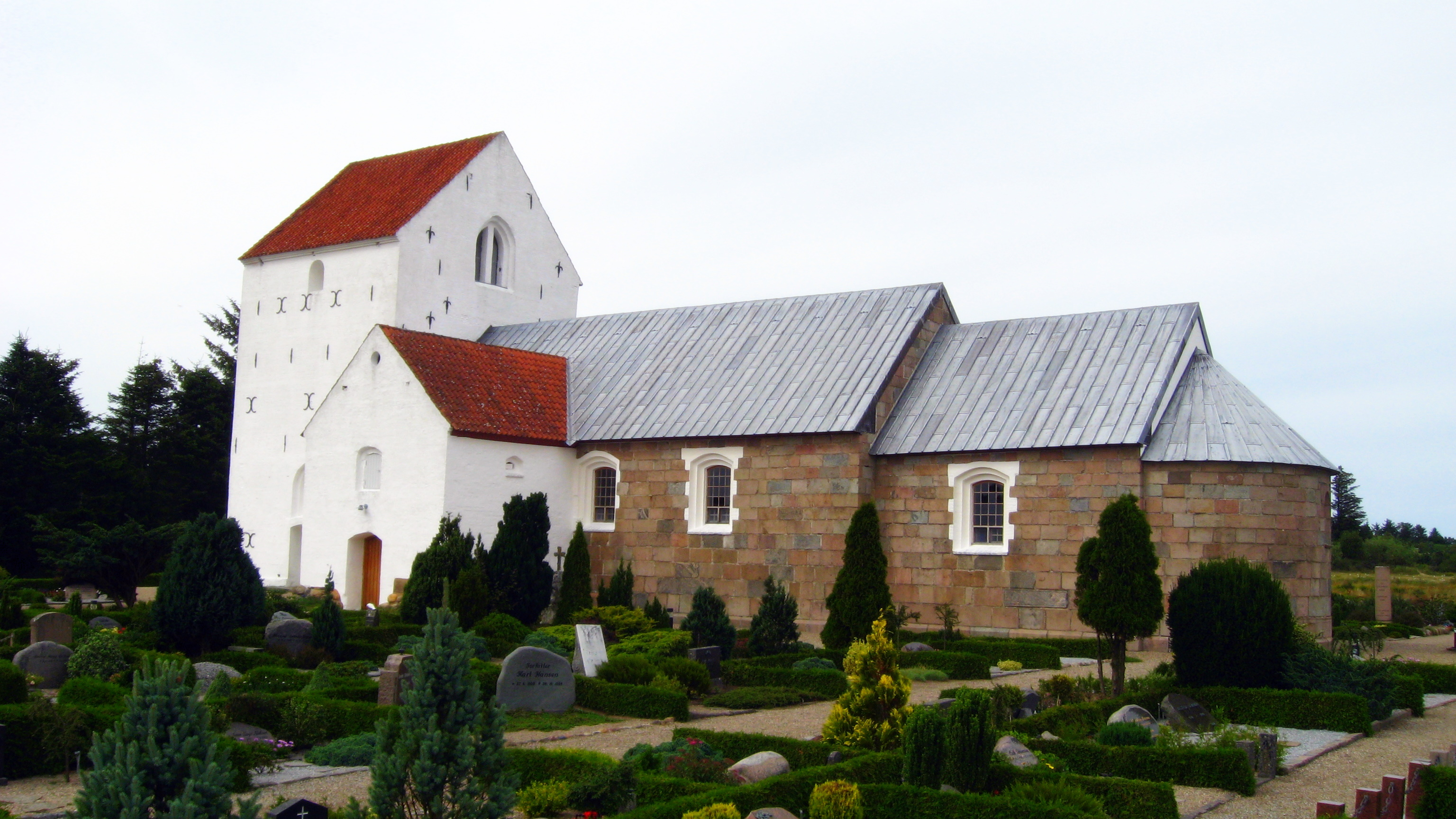
- Hune Church
- 57°15′3.38″N 9°37′4.85″E
- Location: Hune, Denmark
- Denomination: Church of Denmark

Architecture
- Completed: Around 1100

Administration
- Diocese: Diocese of Aalborg
- Deanery: Jammerbugt Provsti
- Parish: Hune Parish

Hune Church, also known as Church of Our Lady (Danish: Vor Frue Kirke), is located in Hune. It is one of two national churches in Hune Parish. The church has a churchyard with a cemetery.

The choir, apse and nave are from around 1100, with extensions added later.

A runestone is located in the ship's church porch. The church has two bells: one from 1475 and one from 1969.

=== Ingstrup Church ===
Ingstrup Church
- Ingstrup Kirke
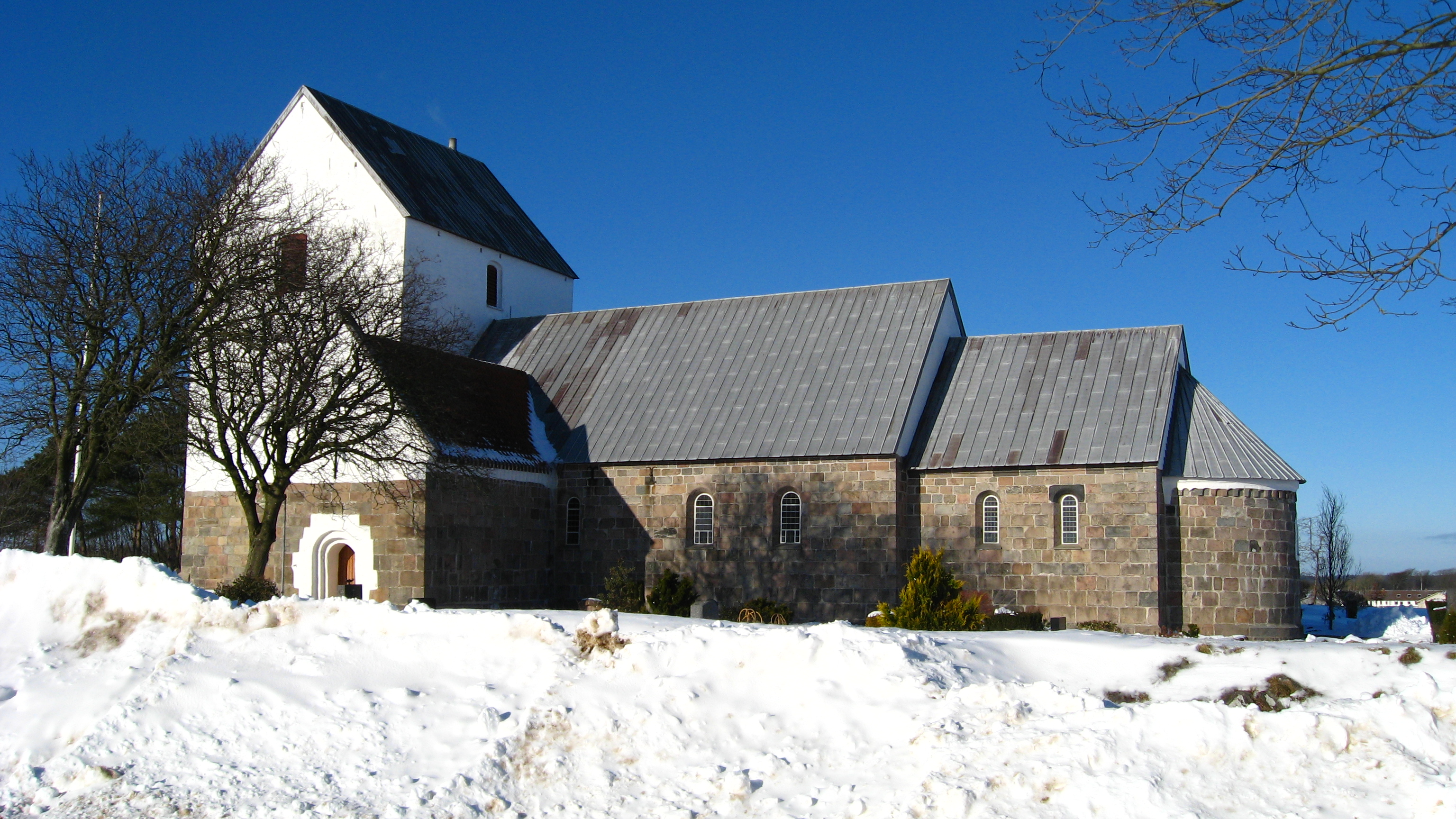
- Ingstrup Church
- 57°18′43.99″N 9°43′27.97″E
- Location: Ingstrup, Denmark
- Denomination: Church of Denmark

Architecture
- Completed: Ca. 1100

Administration
- Diocese: Diocese of Aalborg
- Deanery: Jammerbugt Provsti
- Parish: Ingstrup Parish

Ingstrup Church is located in Ingstrup. It is the only national church in Ingstrup Parish. The church has a churchyard with a cemetery.

The church was built around year 1100.

The altar is in granite. The altarpiece is from the 1500s.

=== Jetsmark Church ===
Jetsmark Church
- Jetsmark Kirke
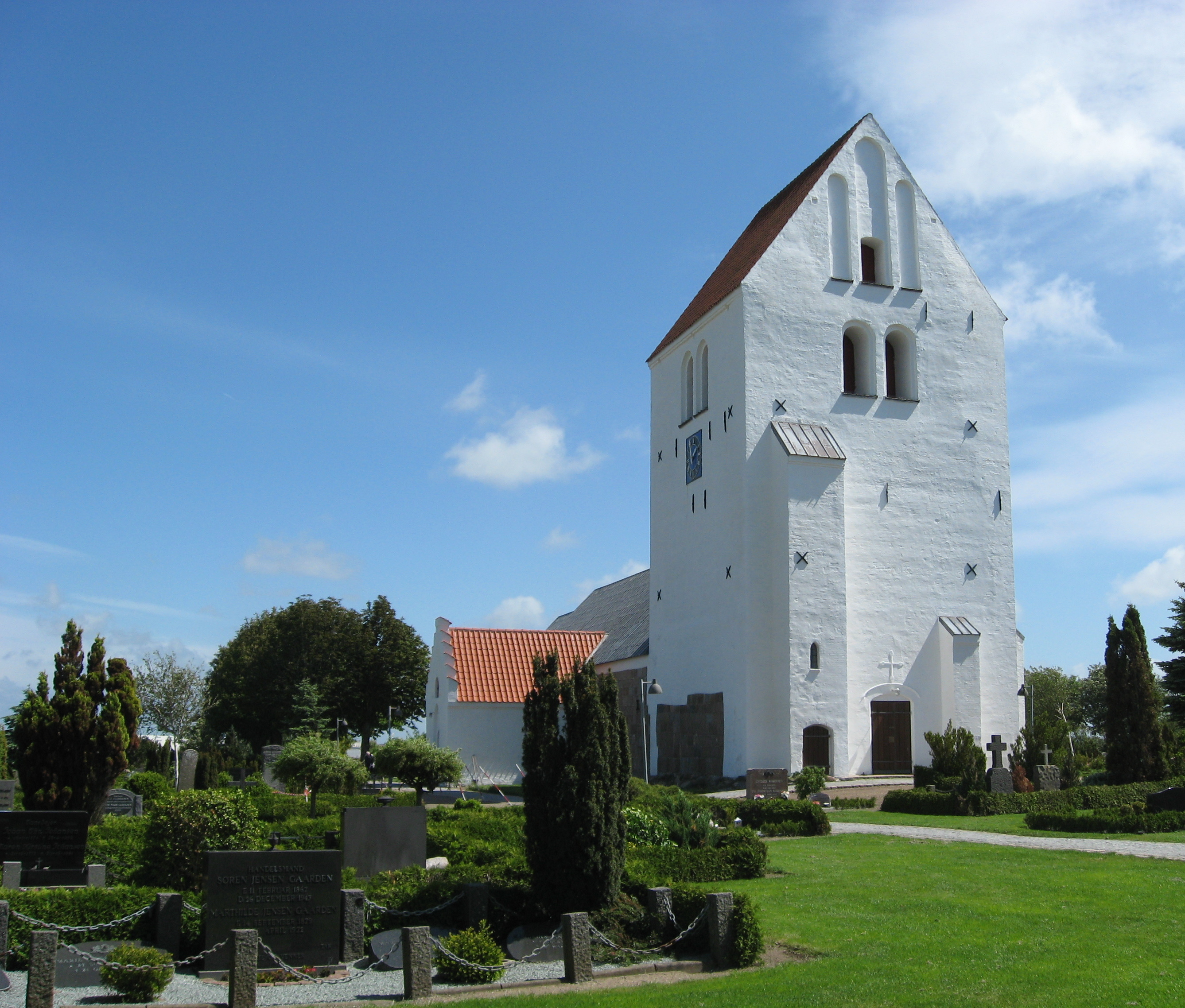
- Jetsmark Church
- 57°12′38.92″N 9°40′10.47″E
- Location: Pandrup, Denmark
- Denomination: Church of Denmark

Architecture
- Completed: Ca. 1150

Administration
- Diocese: Diocese of Aalborg
- Deanery: Jammerbugt Provsti
- Parish: Jetsmark Parish

Jetsmark Church is located in Pandrup. It is the only national church in Jetsmark Parish. The church has a churchyard with a cemetery.

The church was built around year 1150.

A runestone is located in the church porch. There are two bells in the church. One was built in 1802 by Peder Meielstrup in Randers. It was donated by Catharina Elisabeth Scheel (née Cicignon). The other bell is from 1961 from Aalborg. It was donated by Peder Larsen Knudsen.

=== Kettrup Church ===
Kettrup Church
- Kettrup Kirke
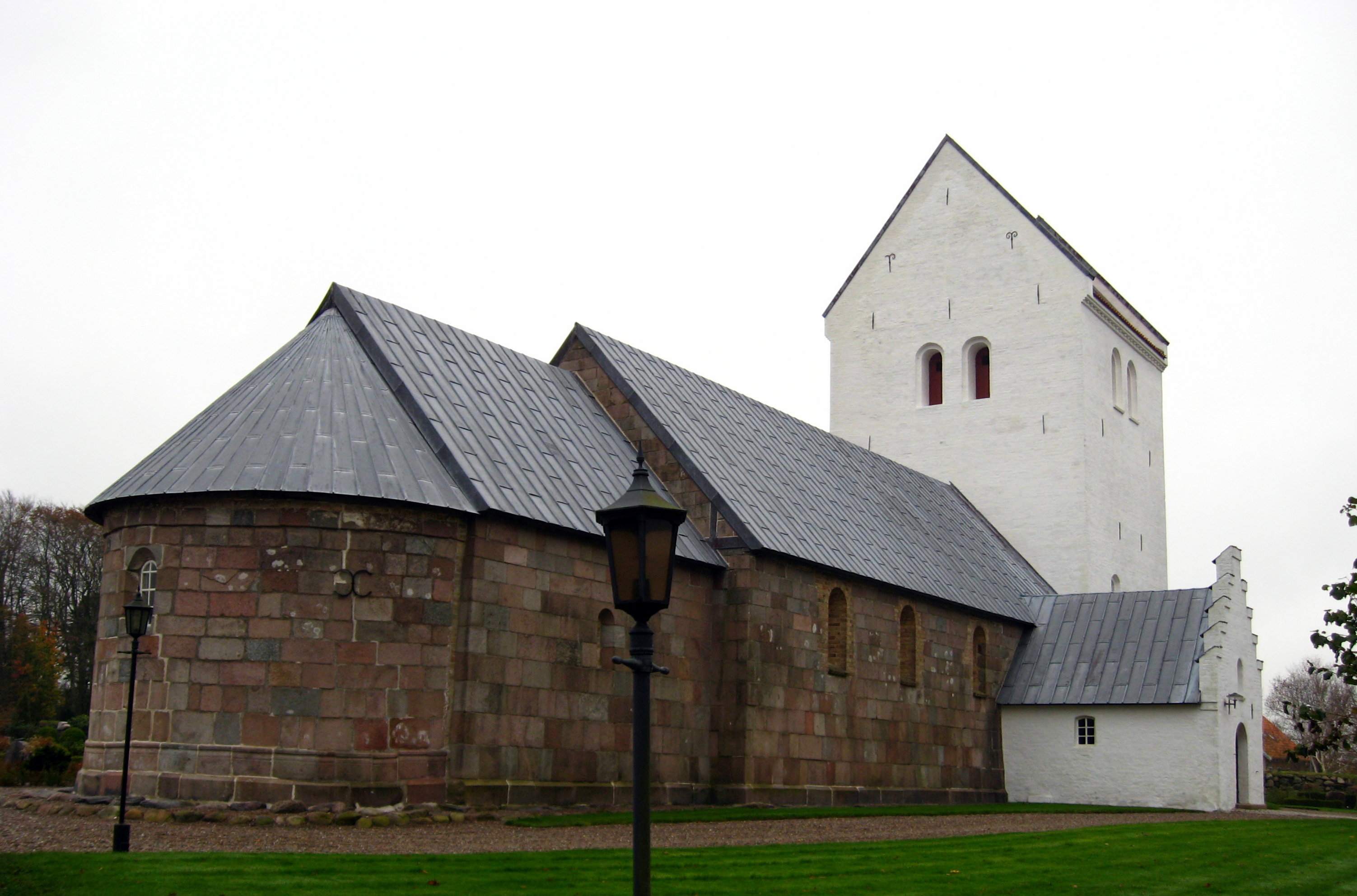
- Kettrup Church
- 57°3′55.88″N 9°15′13.1″E
- Location: Kettrup, Denmark
- Denomination: Church of Denmark

Architecture
- Completed: 1100s

Administration
- Diocese: Diocese of Aalborg
- Deanery: Jammerbugt Provsti
- Parish: Kettrup Parish

Kettrup Church is located in Kettrup. It is the only national church in Kettrup Parish. The church has a churchyard with a cemetery.

The church's nave and choir were built in the 1100s, with the church porch and tower added later.

The altarpiece is from 1612.

=== Klim Church ===
Klim Church
- Klim Kirke
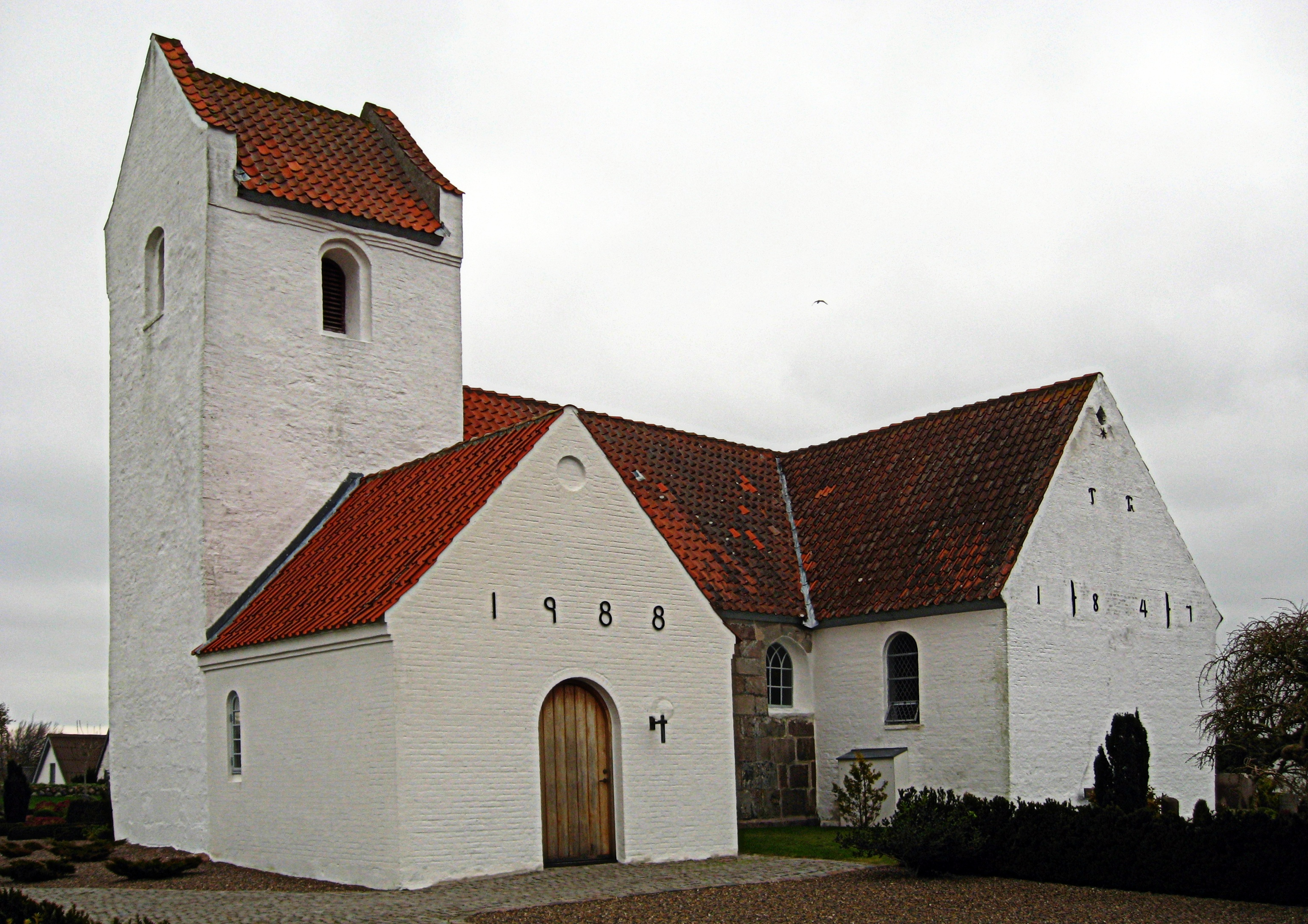
- Klim Church
- 57°5′33.28″N 9°10′12.94″E
- Location: Klim, Denmark
- Denomination: Church of Denmark

Architecture
- Completed: 1100s

Administration
- Diocese: Diocese of Aalborg
- Deanery: Jammerbugt Provsti
- Parish: Klim Parish

Klim Church, also known as Nørre Kirke (Danish: Northern Church), is located in Klim. It is the only national church in Klim Parish, though an independent church is also located in the parish. The church has a churchyard with a cemetery.

The church was built in the 1100s. The church porch was built in 1870.

The altarpiece is from around 1600. The pulpit is from around 1610.

=== Koldmose Church ===
Koldmose Church
- Koldmose Kirke
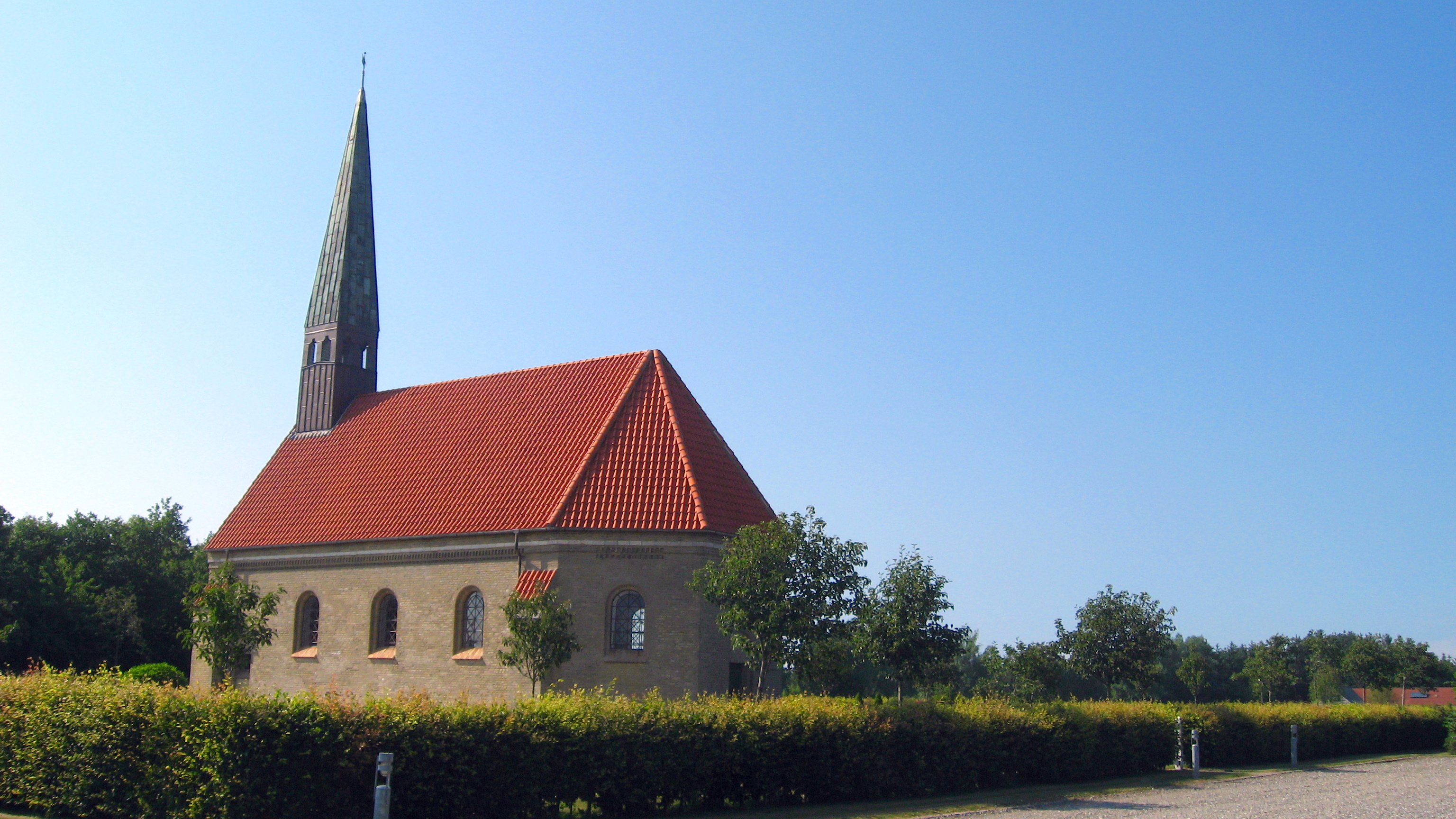
- Koldmose Church
- 57°9′12.04″N 9°33′9.06″E
- Denomination: Church of Denmark

Administration
- Diocese: Diocese of Aalborg
- Deanery: Jammerbugt Provsti
- Parish: Koldmose Parish

Koldmose Church is located 5 km north-west of Tranum and 6 km north of Brovst. It is the only national church in Koldmose Parish. The church has a churchyard with a cemetery.

=== Kollerup Church ===
Kollerup Church
- Kollerup Kirke
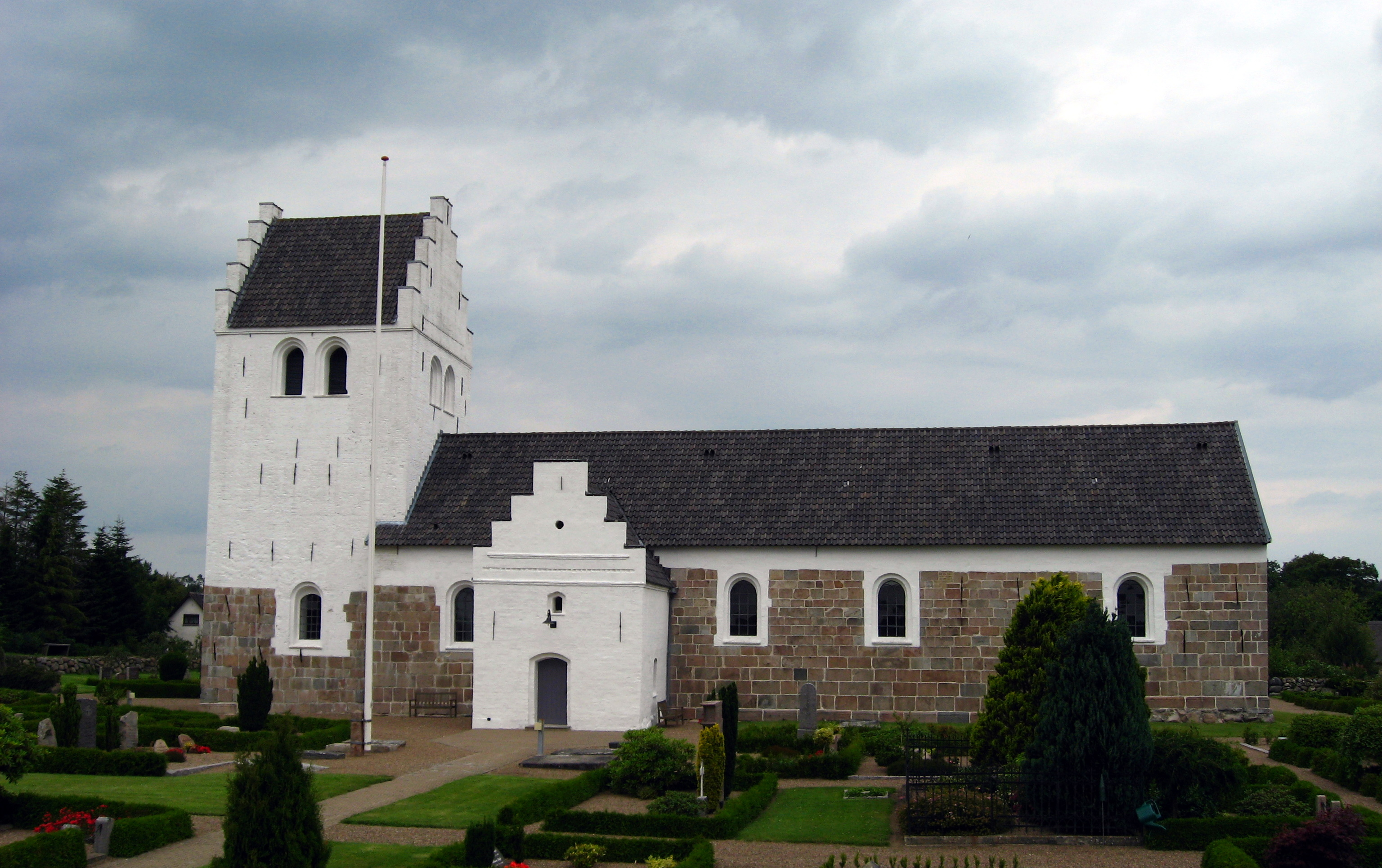
- Kollerup Church
- 57°5′50.96″N 9°17′41.67″E
- Location: Kollerup, Denmark
- Denomination: Church of Denmark

Architecture
- Completed: 1100s

Administration
- Diocese: Diocese of Aalborg
- Deanery: Jammerbugt Provsti
- Parish: Kollerup-Fjerritslev Parish

Kollerup Church is located in Kollerup. It is one of two national churches in Kollerup-Fjerritslev Parish. The church has a churchyard with a cemetery.

The church was built in the 1100s.

The altarpiece is from 1883. The pulpit is from 1599.

=== Langeslund Church ===
Langeslund Church
- Langeslund Kirke
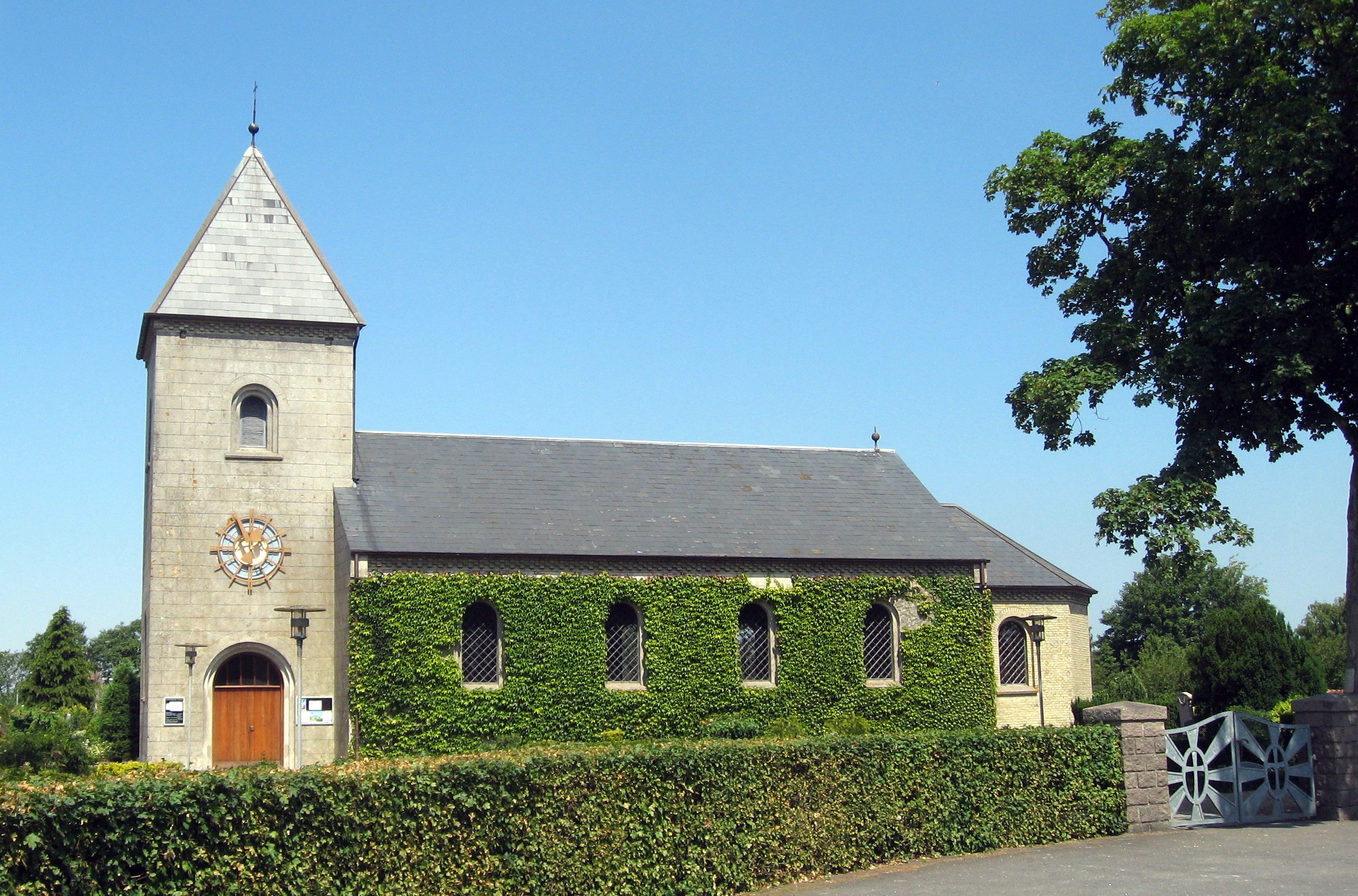
- Langeslund Church
- 57°7′19.37″N 9°37′17.37″E
- Location: Arentsminde, Denmark
- Denomination: Church of Denmark

Administration
- Diocese: Diocese of Aalborg
- Deanery: Jammerbugt Provsti
- Parish: Langeslund Parish

Langeslund Church is located in Arentsminde. It is the only national church in Langeslund Parish. The church has a churchyard with a cemetery.

=== Lerup Church ===
Lerup Church
- Lerup Kirke
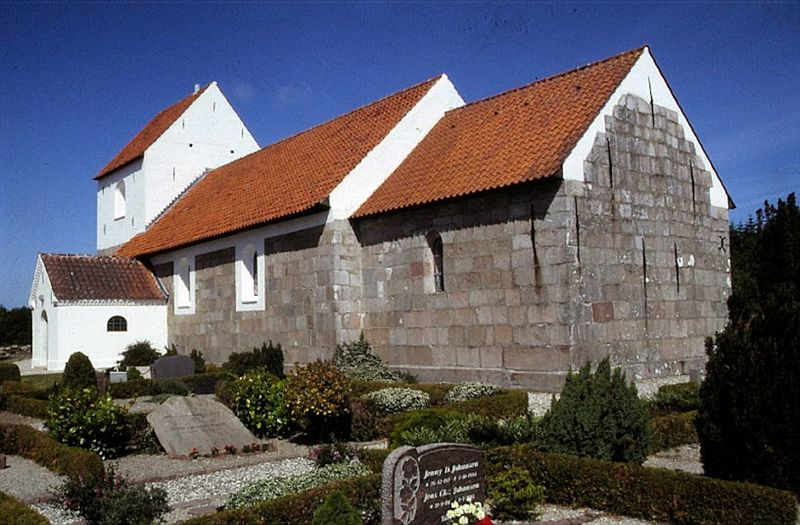
- Lerup Church
- 57°7′33.35″N 9°25′12.6″E
- Denomination: Church of Denmark

Administration
- Diocese: Diocese of Aalborg
- Deanery: Jammerbugt Provsti
- Parish: Lerup Parish

Lerup Church is located 3 km east of Tranum. It is the only national church in Lerup Parish. The church has a churchyard with a cemetery.

=== Oxholm Church ===
Oxholm Church
- Oxholm Kirke
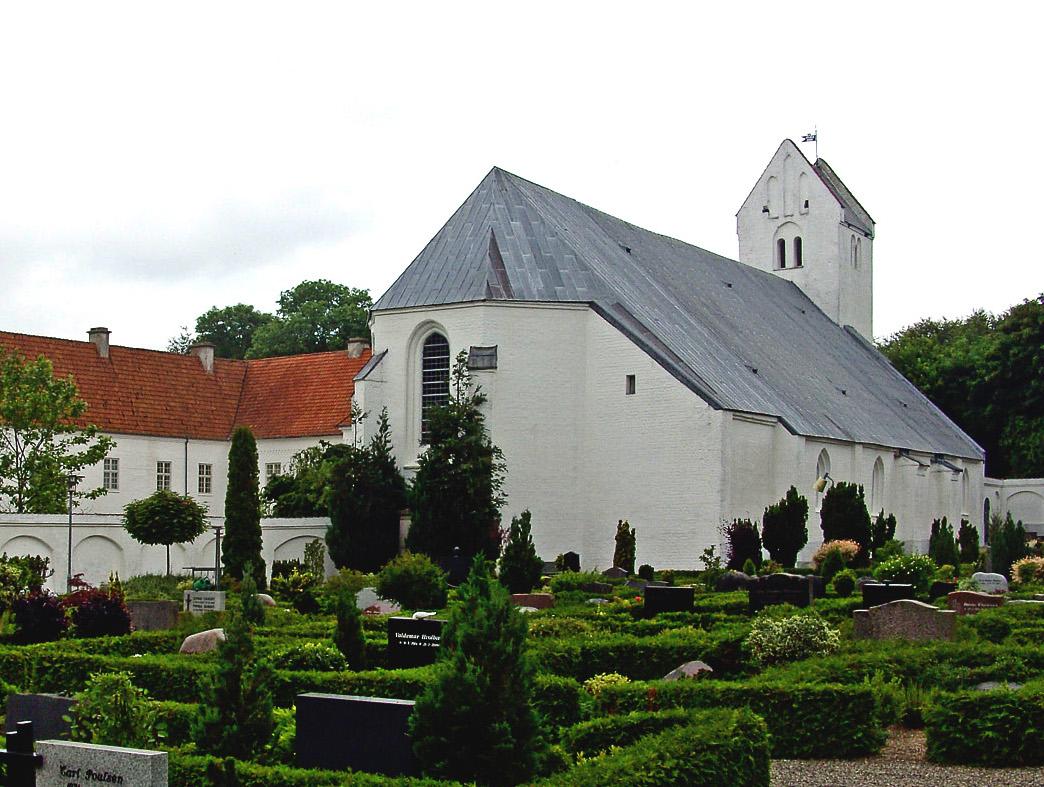
- Oxholm Church
- 57°3′47.4″N 9°34′25.07″E
- Denomination: Church of Denmark

Architecture
- Completed: 1400s

Administration
- Diocese: Diocese of Aalborg
- Deanery: Jammerbugt Provsti
- Parish: Øland Parish

Oxholm Church, also known as Øland Church, is located at the manor of Oxholm, 2 km north-west of Østerby. It is the only national church in Øland Parish. The church has a churchyard with a cemetery.

The church was built in the 1400s.

=== Rødhus Church ===
Rødhus Church
- Rødhus Kirke
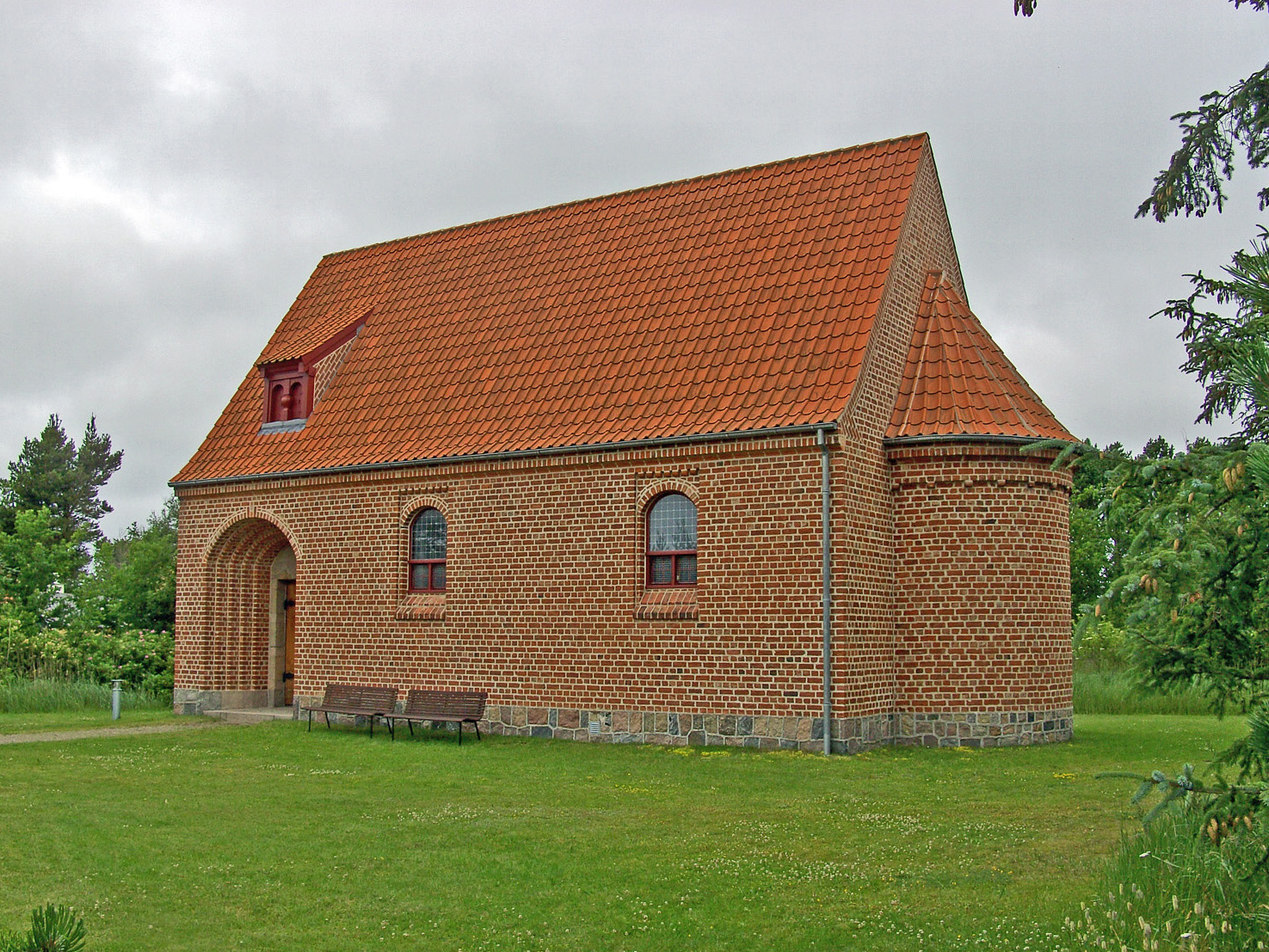
- Rødhus Church
- 57°12′24.34″N 9°32′45.26″E
- Location: Rødhus, Denmark
- Denomination: Church of Denmark

Architecture
- Completed: 1913

Administration
- Diocese: Diocese of Aalborg
- Deanery: Jammerbugt Provsti
- Parish: Hune Parish

Rødhus Church is located in Rødhus. It is one of two national churches in Hune Parish.

=== Saltum Church ===
Saltum Church
- Saltum Kirke
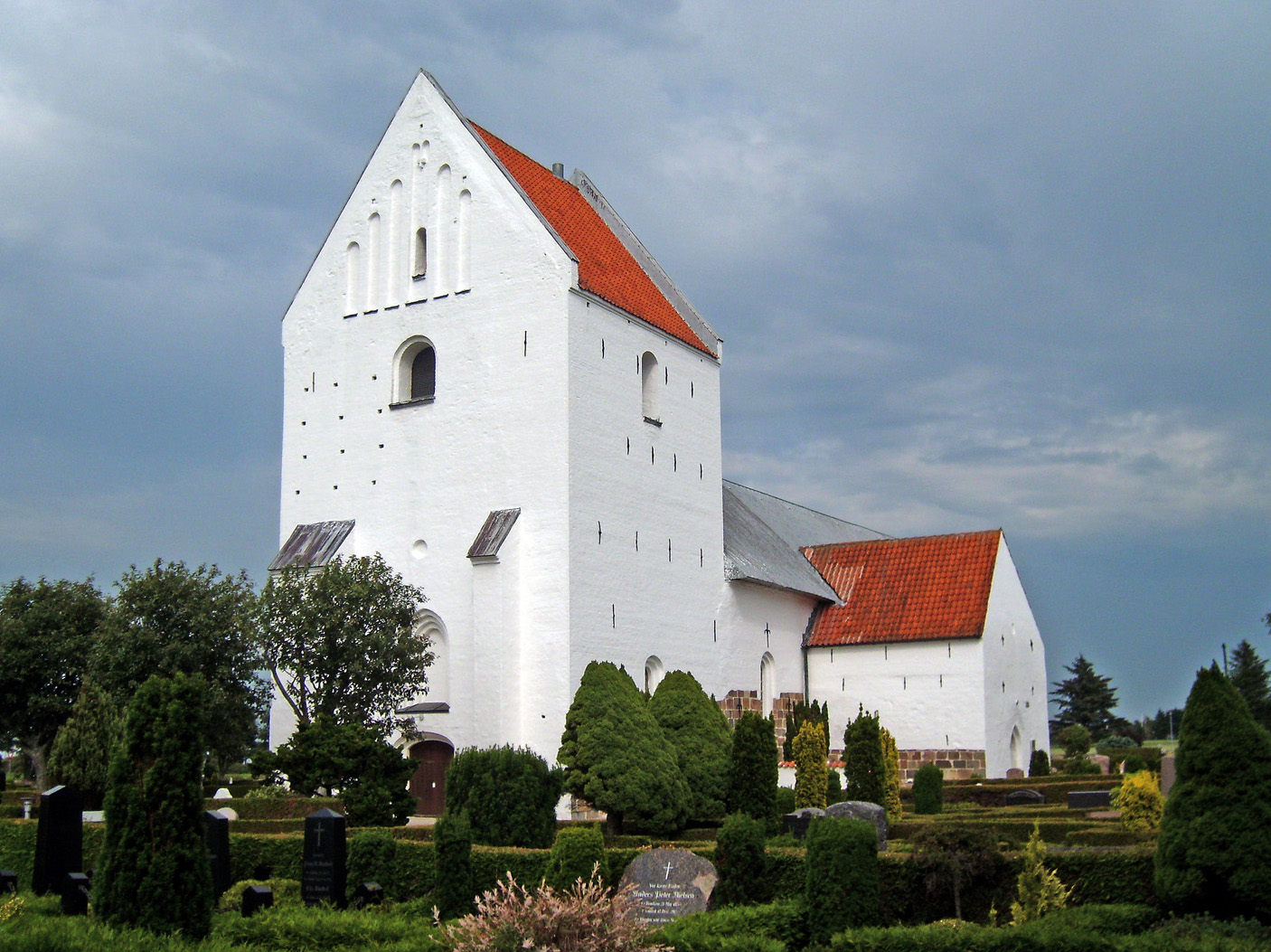
- Saltum Church
- 57°16′55.25″N 9°41′43.59″E
- Location: Saltum, Denmark
- Denomination: Church of Denmark

Architecture
- Completed: Ca. 1150

Administration
- Diocese: Diocese of Aalborg
- Deanery: Jammerbugt Provsti
- Parish: Saltum Parish

Saltum Church is located in Saltum. It is the only national church in Saltum Parish. The church has a churchyard with a cemetery.

The church was built around 1150 and rebuilt around 1450.

=== Skræm Church ===
Skræm Church
- Skræm Kirke
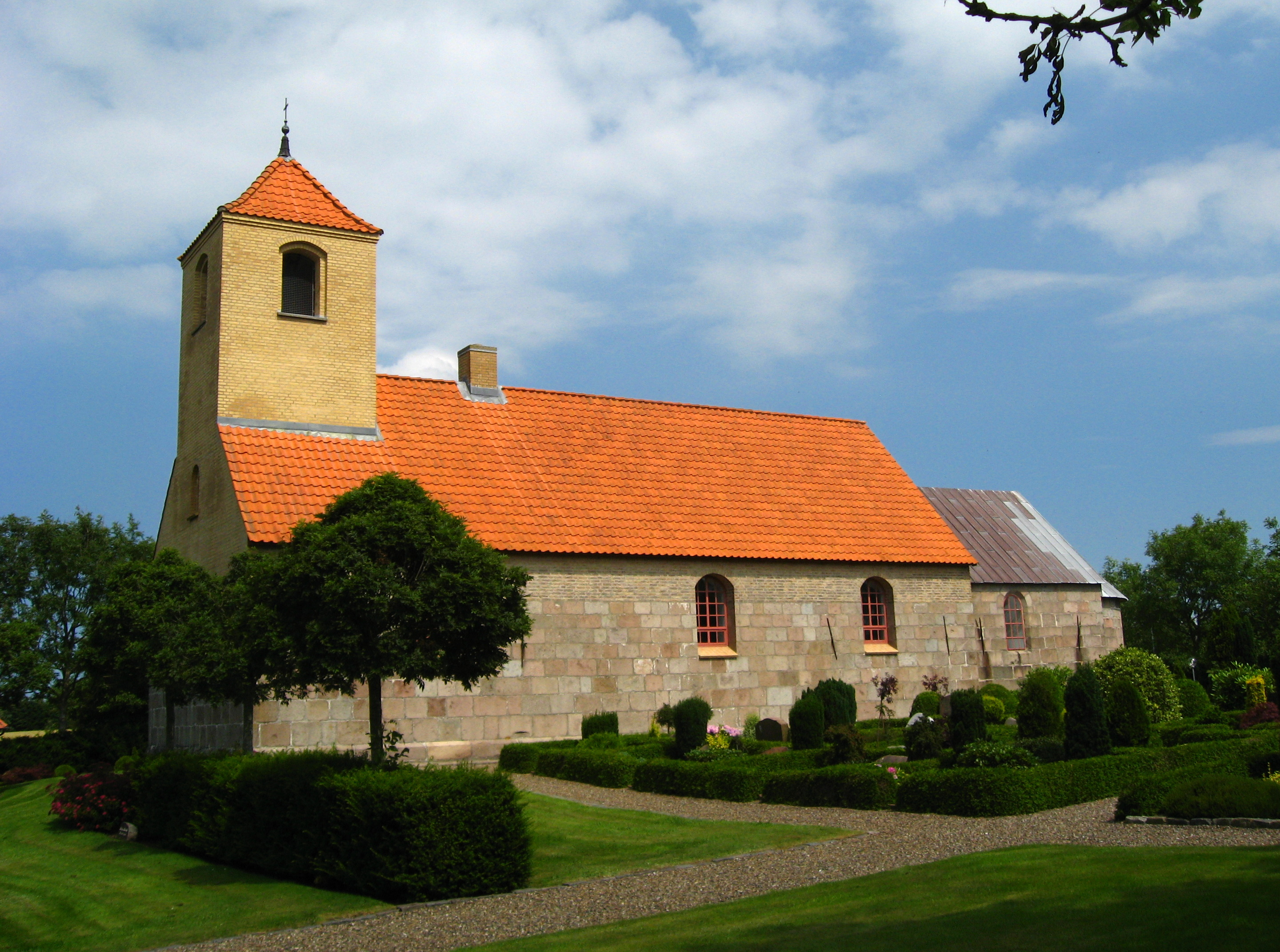
- Skræm Church
- 57°4′9.45″N 9°20′21.48″E
- Location: Skræm, Denmark
- Denomination: Church of Denmark

Architecture
- Completed: 1100s

Administration
- Diocese: Diocese of Aalborg
- Deanery: Jammerbugt Provsti
- Parish: Skræm Parish

Skræm Church is located in Skræm. It is the only national church in Skræm Parish. The church has a churchyard with a cemetery.

The church was built in the 1100s. The tower is from 1949.

The altarpiece is from 1679.

=== Torslev Church ===
Torslev Church
- Torslev Kirke
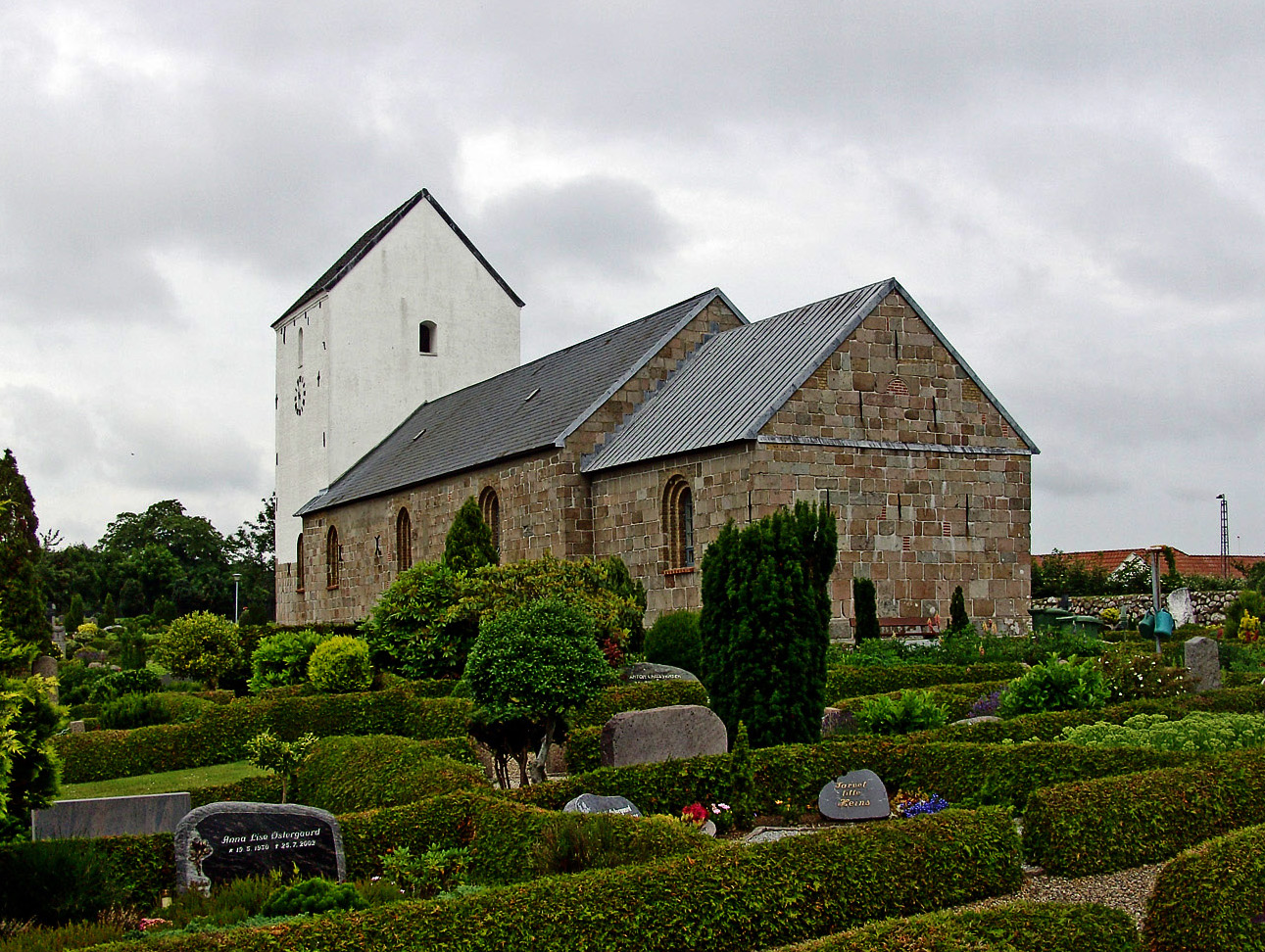
- Torslev Church
- 57°4′19.72″N 9°29′0.58″E
- Location: Torslev, Denmark
- Denomination: Church of Denmark

Administration
- Diocese: Diocese of Aalborg
- Deanery: Jammerbugt Provsti
- Parish: Torslev Parish

Torslev Church is located in Torslev. It is the only national church in Torslev Parish. The church has a churchyard with a cemetery.

=== Tranum Church ===
Tranum Church
- Tranum Kirke
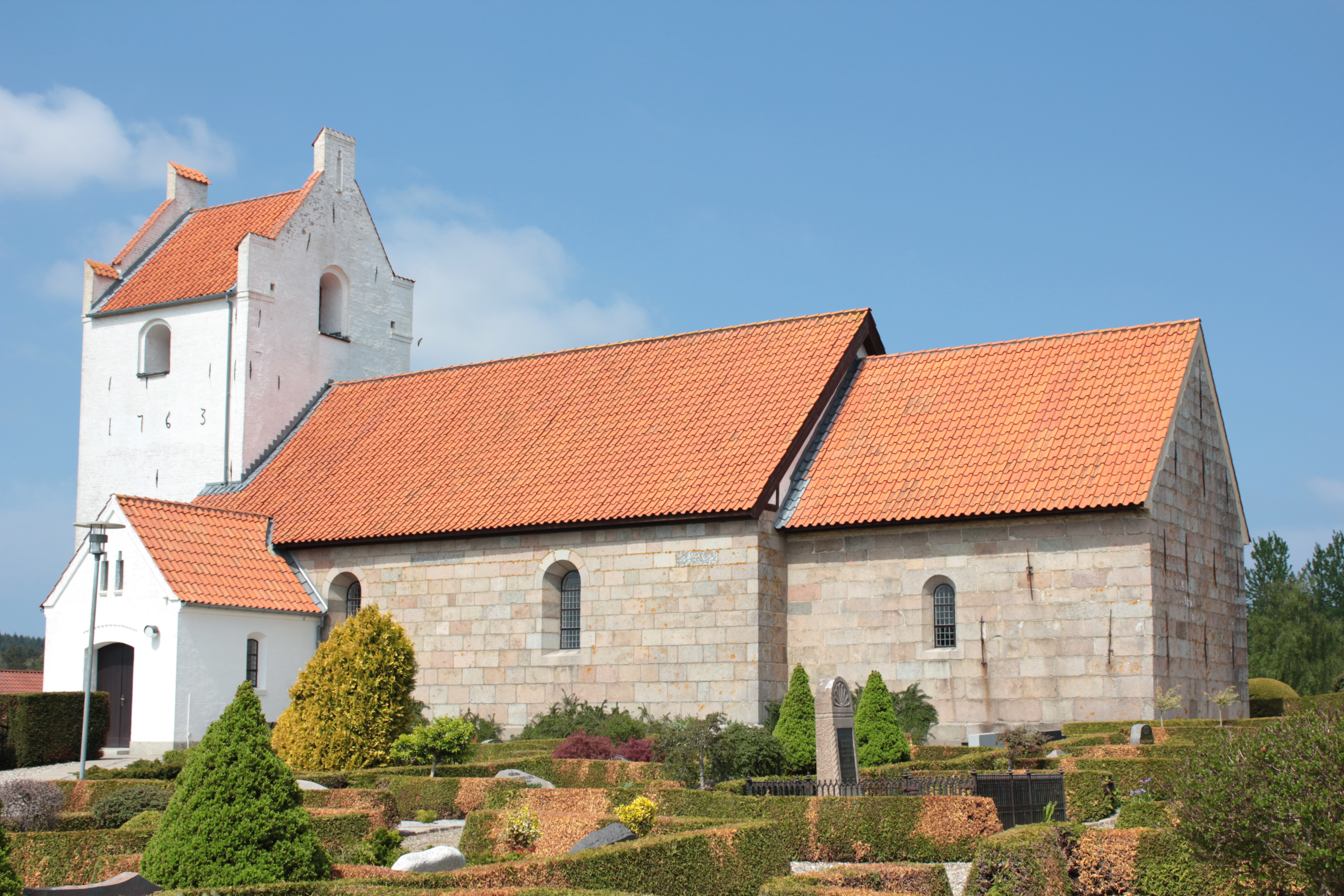
- Tranum Church
- 57°7′57.59″N 9°28′11.89″E
- Location: Tranum, Denmark
- Denomination: Church of Denmark

Administration
- Diocese: Diocese of Aalborg
- Deanery: Jammerbugt Provsti
- Parish: Tranum Parish

Tranum Church is located in Tranum. It is the only national church in Tranum Parish. The church has a churchyard with a cemetery.

=== Vedsted Church ===
Vedsted Church
- Vedsted Kirke
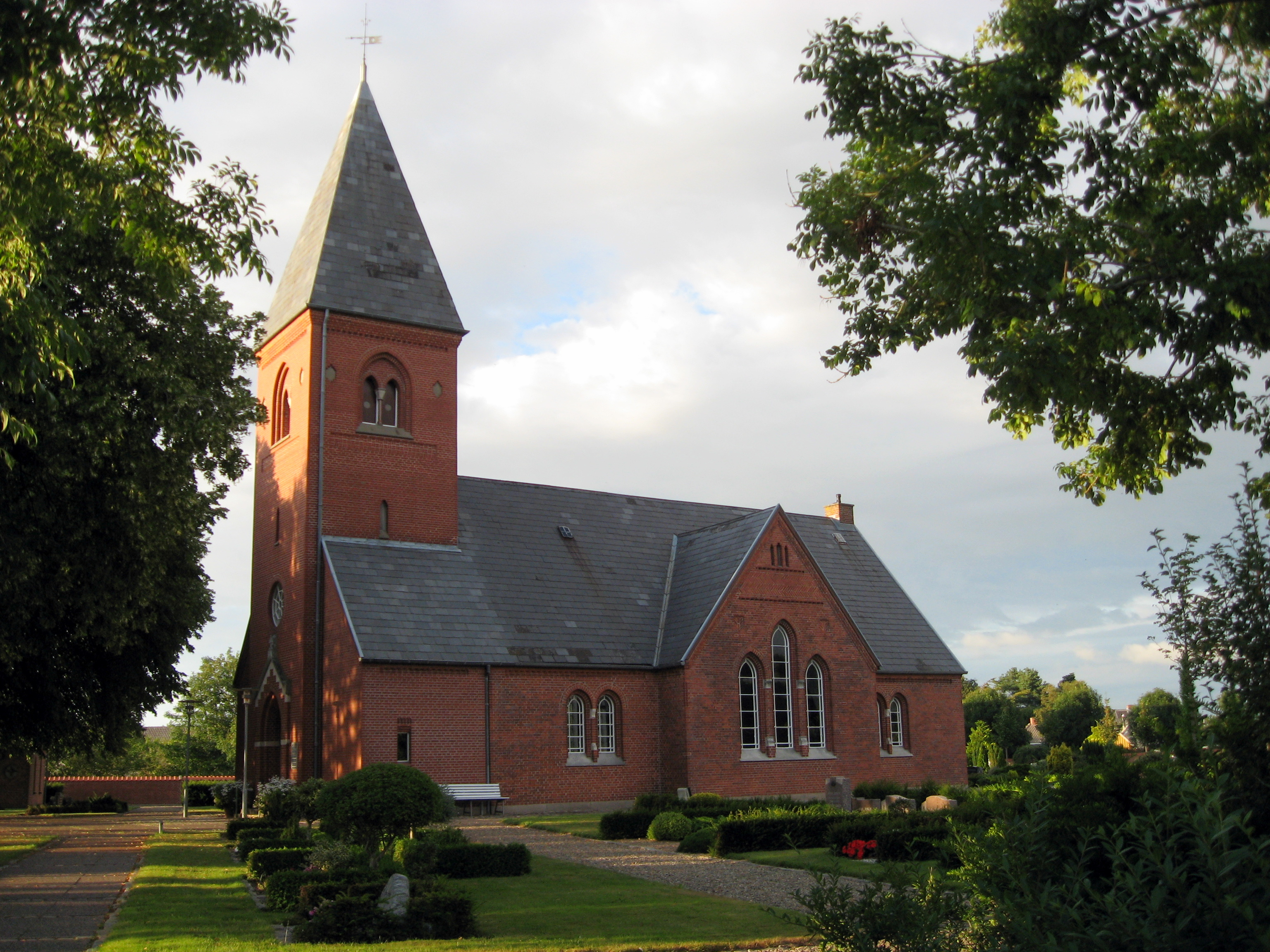
- Vedsted Church
- 57°8′53.09″N 9°41′5.86″E
- Location: Birkelse, Denmark
- Denomination: Church of Denmark

Architecture
- Completed: 1899

Administration
- Diocese: Diocese of Aalborg
- Deanery: Jammerbugt Provsti
- Parish: Vedsted Parish

Vedsted Church is located in Birkelse. It is the only national church in Vedsted Parish. The church has a churchyard with a cemetery.

The church was built in 1899 by architect Hans V. Ahlmann. The church was renovated in 1974 and again in 2014.

The altarpiece is from the 2014 renovations. It was painted by Arne Haugen Sørensen.

=== Vester Hjermitslev Church ===
Vester Hjermitslev Church
- Vester Hjermitslev Kirke
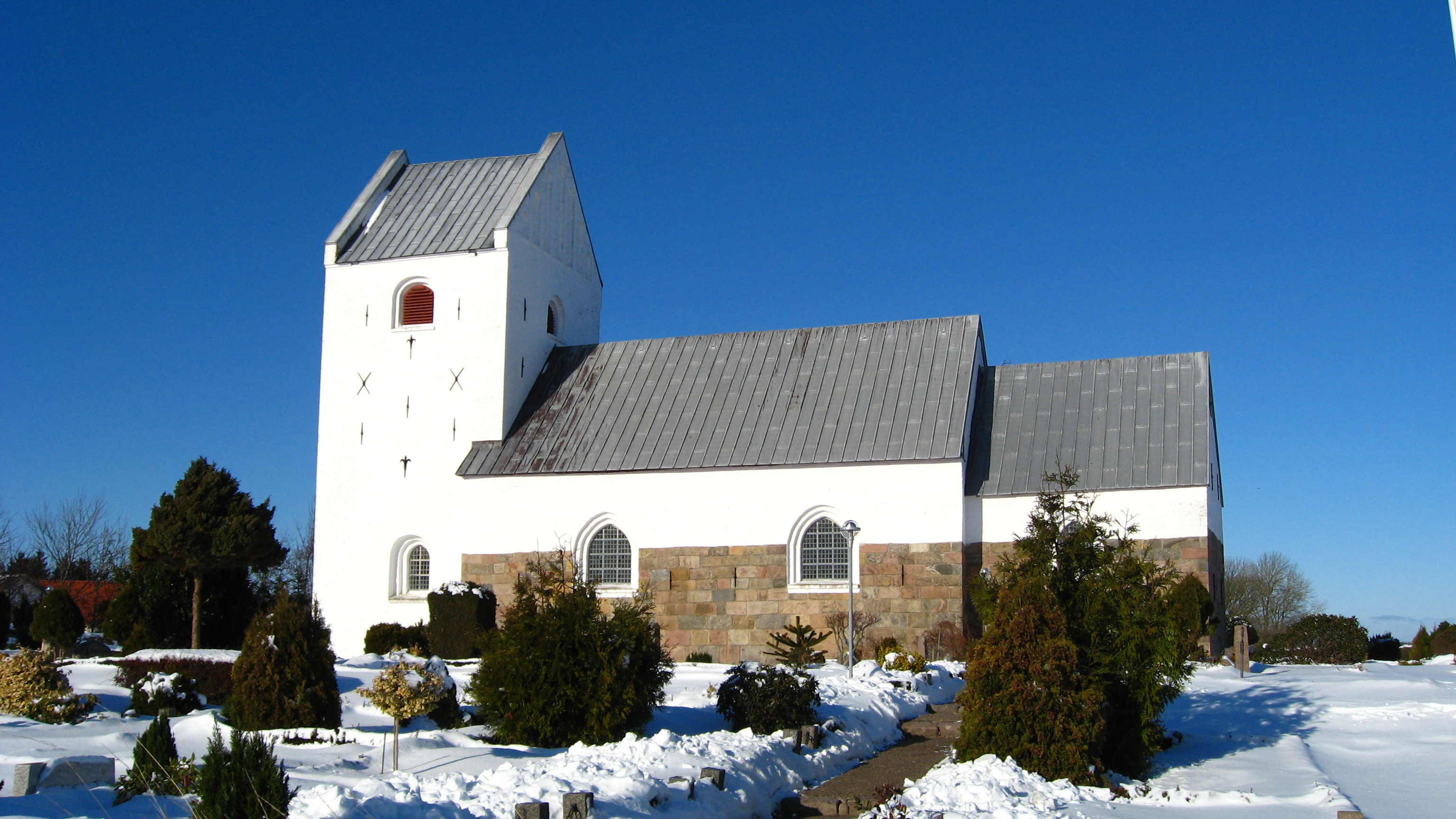
- Vester Hjermitslev Church
- 57°17′31.55″N 9°45′17.34″E
- Location: Vester Hjermitslev, Denmark
- Denomination: Church of Denmark

Architecture
- Completed: Ca. 1200

Administration
- Diocese: Diocese of Aalborg
- Deanery: Jammerbugt Provsti
- Parish: Vester Hjermitslev Parish

Vester Hjermitslev Church is located in Vester Hjermitslev. It is the only national church in Vester Hjermitslev Parish. The church has a churchyard with a cemetery.

The church was built around year 1200.

=== Vester Torup Church ===
Vester Torup Church
- Vester Torup Kirke
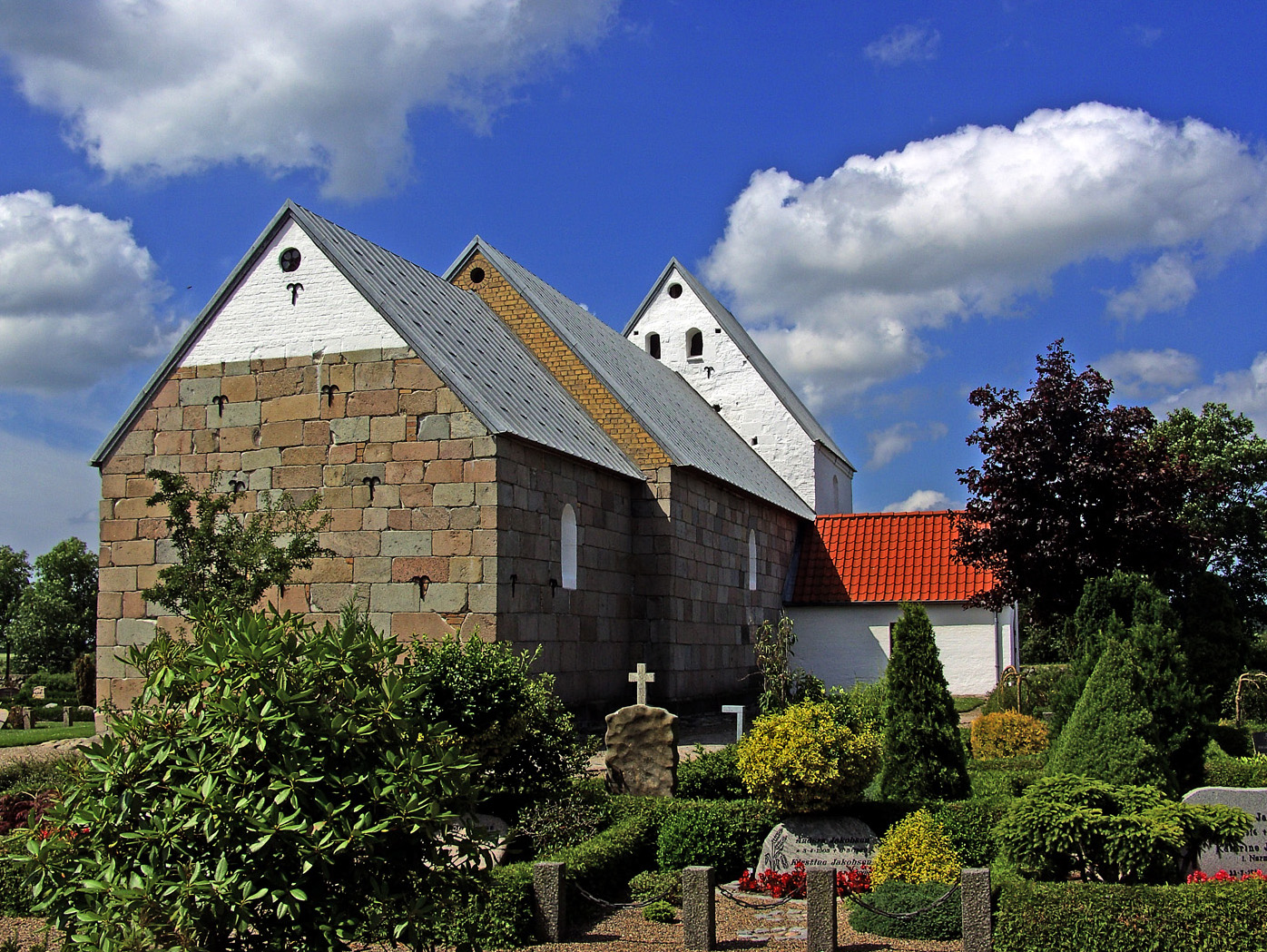
- Vester Torup Church
- 57°6′10.51″N 9°7′25.76″E
- Location: Vester Torup, Denmark
- Denomination: Church of Denmark

Architecture
- Completed: 1100s

Administration
- Diocese: Diocese of Aalborg
- Deanery: Jammerbugt Provsti
- Parish: Vester Torup Parish

Vester Torup Church, also known as Torup Church, is located in Vester Torup. It is the only national church in Vester Torup Parish. The church has a churchyard with a cemetery.

The church was built in the 1100s, with the tower built around year 1500.

=== Vust Church ===
Vust Church
- Vust Kirke
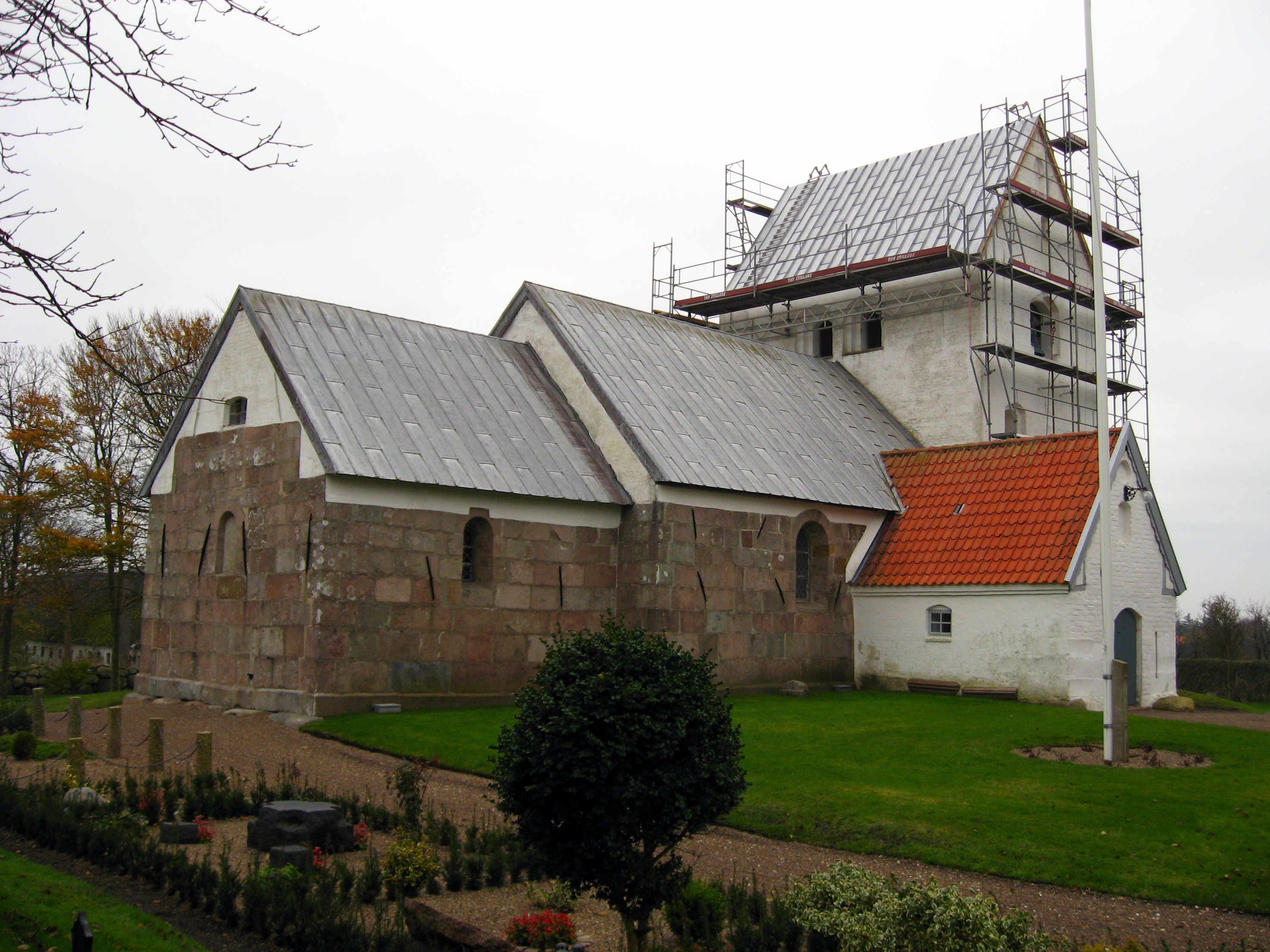
- Vust Church
- 57°6′54.77″N 9°3′48.76″E
- Location: Vust, Denmark
- Denomination: Church of Denmark

Architecture
- Completed: 1100s

Administration
- Diocese: Diocese of Aalborg
- Deanery: Jammerbugt Provsti
- Parish: Vust Parish

Vust Church is located in Vust. It is the only national church in Vust Parish. The church has a churchyard with a cemetery.

The church was built in the 1100s. The tower is from around year 1500.

=== Øster Svenstrup Church ===
Øster Svenstrup Church
- Øster Svenstrup Kirke
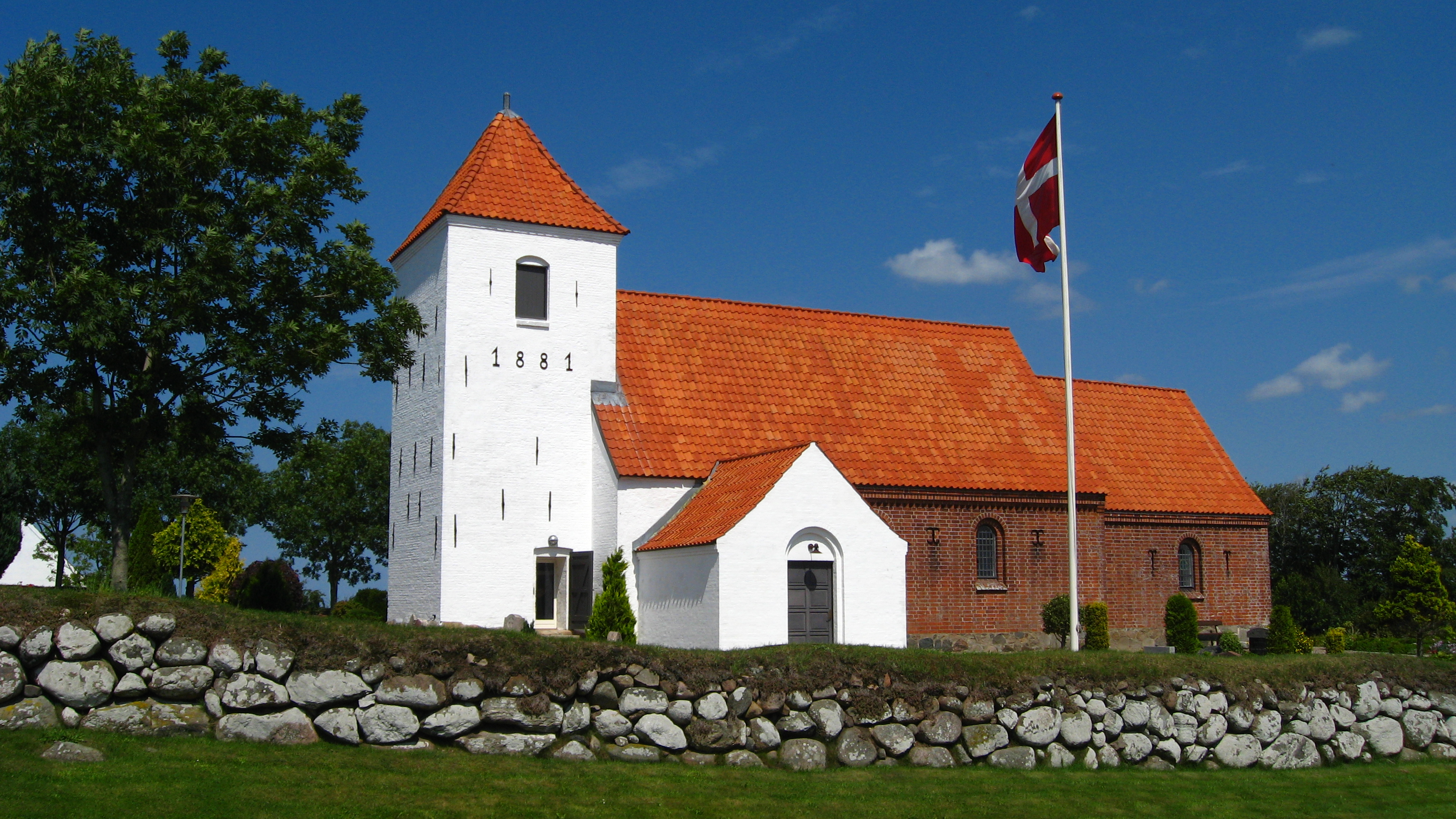
- Øster Svenstrup Church
- 57°6′4.4″N 9°28′12.57″E
- Location: Øster Svenstrup, Denmark
- Denomination: Church of Denmark

Administration
- Diocese: Diocese of Aalborg
- Deanery: Jammerbugt Provsti
- Parish: Øster Svenstrup Parish

Øster Svenstrup Church is located in Øster Svenstrup. It is the only national church in Øster Svenstrup Parish. The church has a churchyard with a cemetery.

== Independent churches ==
=== Klim Independent Church ===
Klim Independent Church
- Klim Valgmenighedskirke
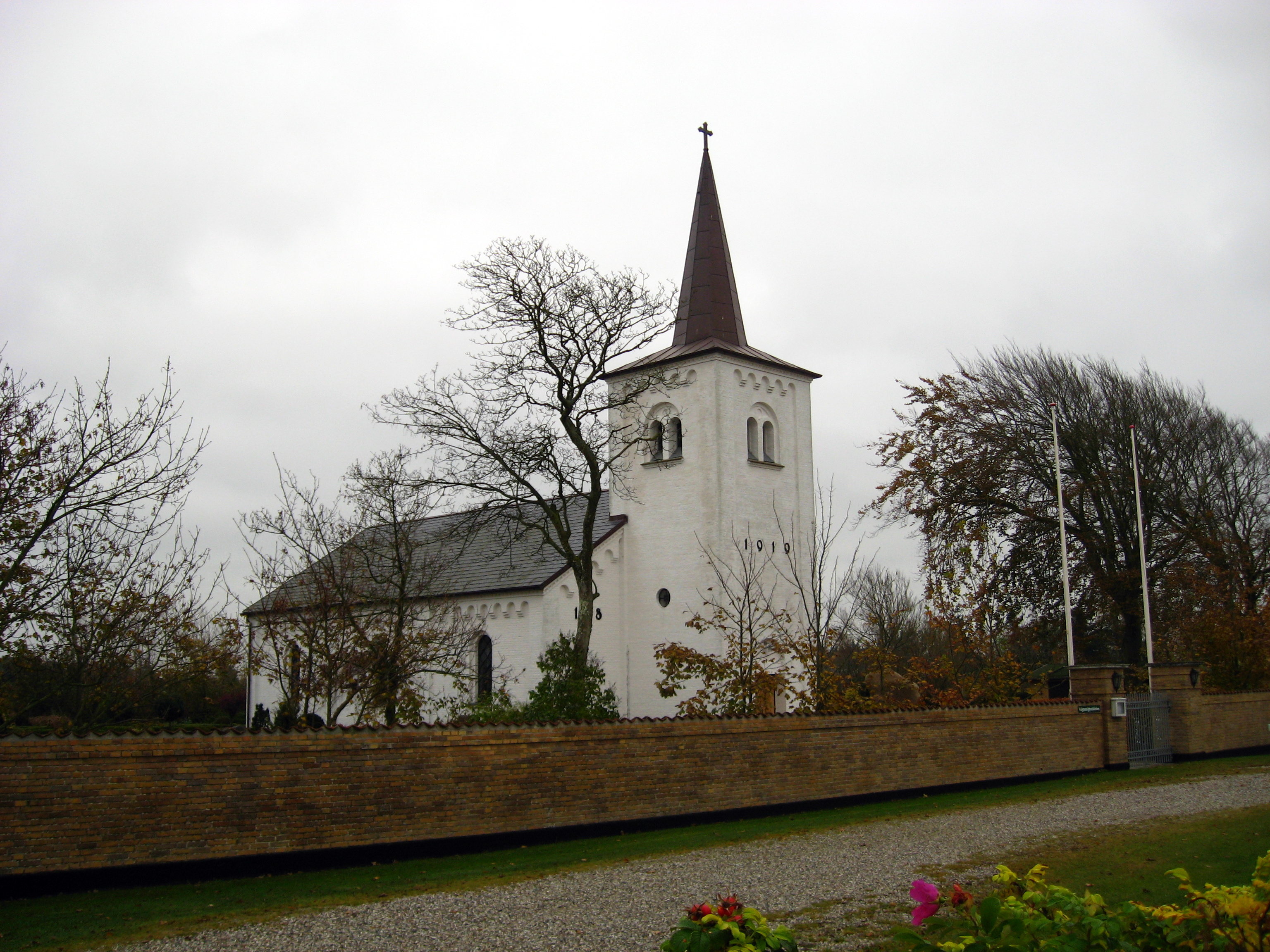
- Klim Independent Church
- 57°5′22.8″N 9°10′7.96″E
- Location: Klim, Denmark
- Denomination: Church of Denmark

Architecture
- Completed: 1883

Klim Independent Church, also known as Morten Luther Church and Sønderkirke (Danish: Southern Church), is located in Klim. It is one of two churches in Klim Parish, though being an independent church it isn't affiliated with the parish. The church has a churchyard with a cemetery.

The church was built in 1883 and first opened on 10 November same year. The tower was built in 1919. It was built by artisan Andreas Bentsen.

The baptismal font is from 1883. The altarpiece is from 1908 and painted by Tony Müller.

== Other churches ==
=== Brovst Baptist Church ===
Brovst Baptist Church
- Brovst Baptistkirke
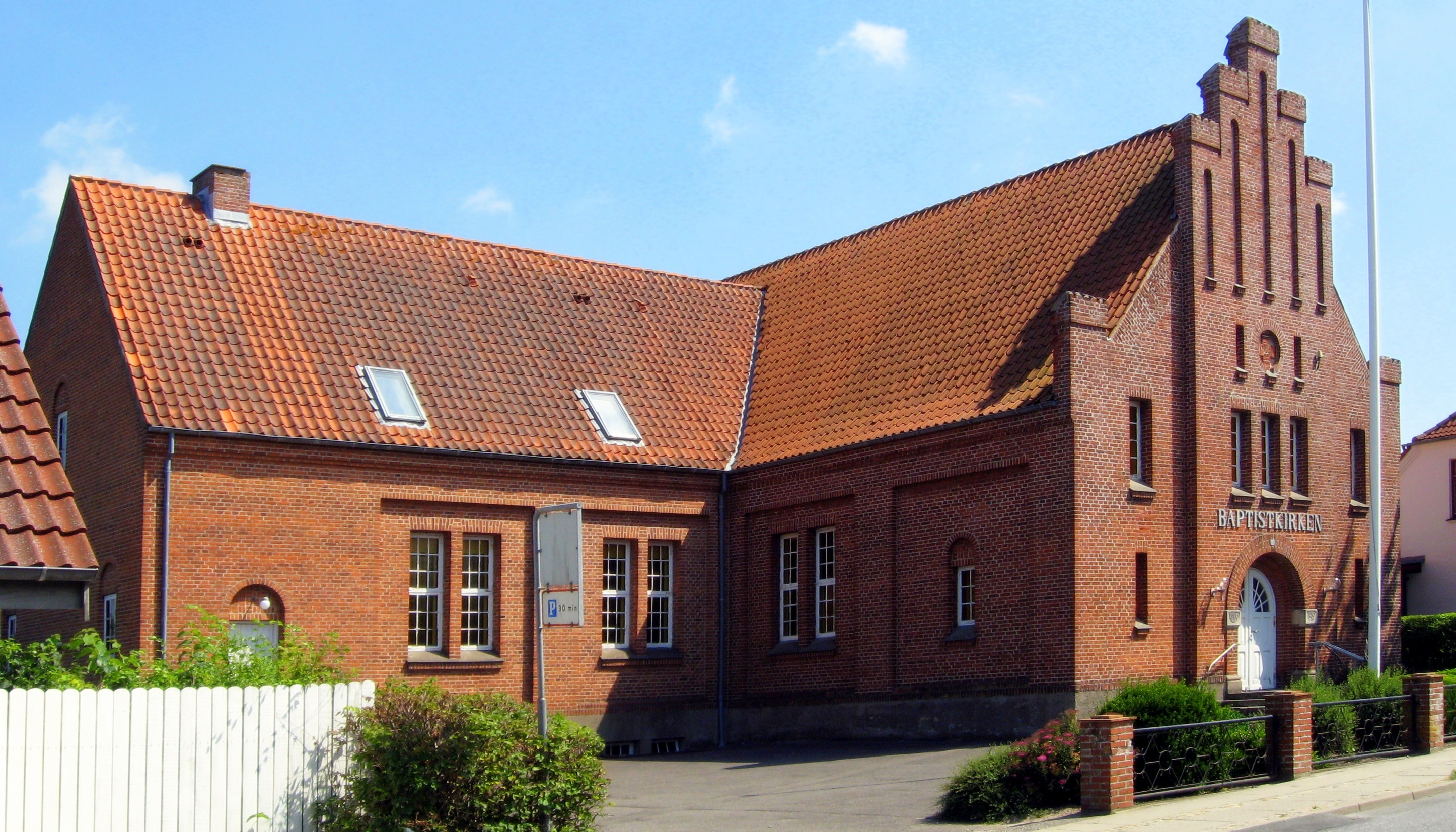
- Brovst Baptist Church
- 57°5′45.79″N 9°31′32.33″E
- Location: Brovst, Denmark
- Denomination: Baptism

Brovst Baptist Church is located in Brovst.

=== Pandrup-Birkelse Baptist Church ===
Pandrup-Birkelse Baptist Church
- Pandrup-Birkelse Baptistkirke
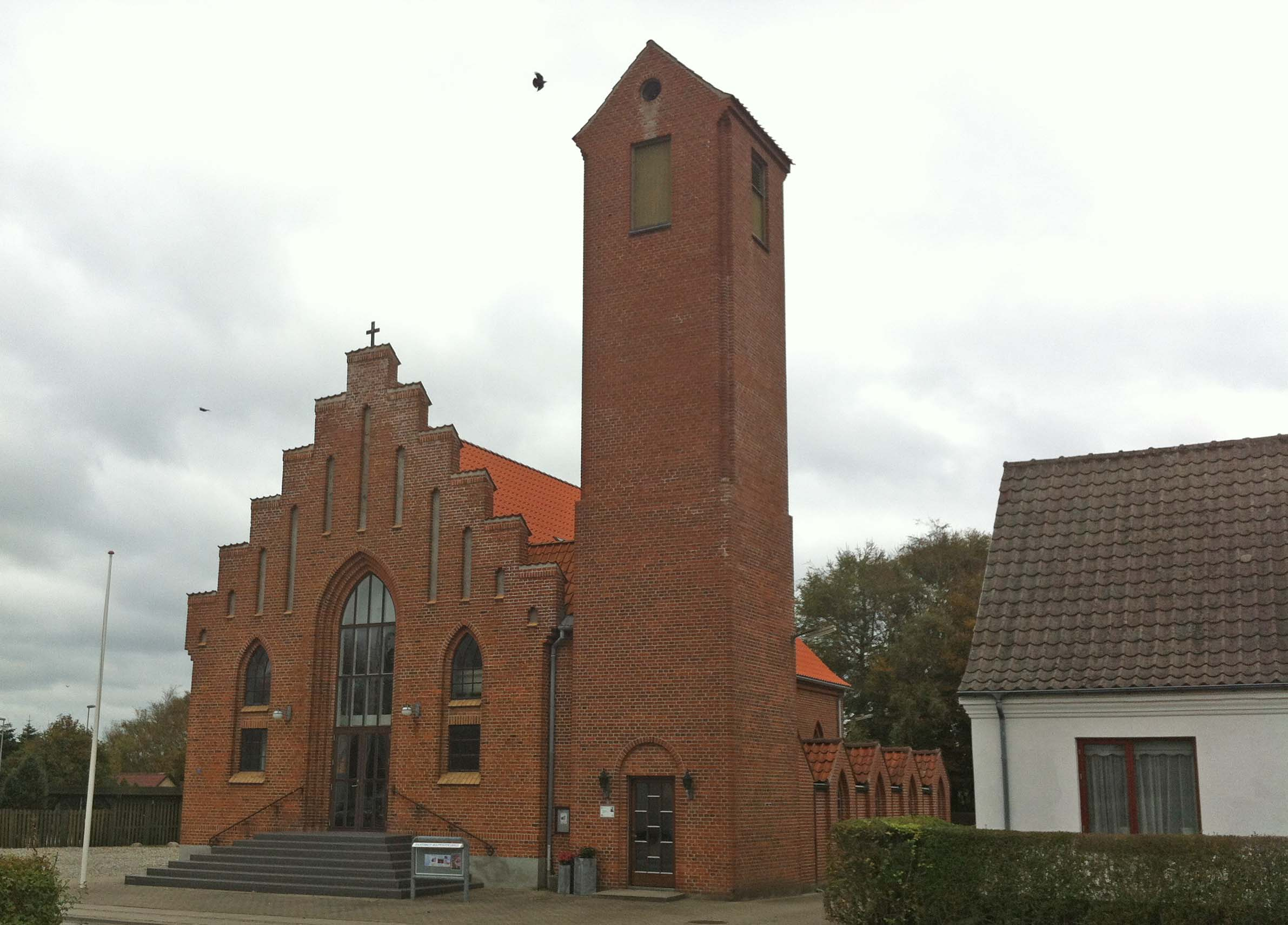
- Pandrup-Birkelse Baptist Church
- 57°13′12.39″N 9°40′35.94″E
- Location: Pandrup, Denmark
- Denomination: Baptism

Pandrup-Birkelse Baptist Church is located in Pandrup.

=== Saltum Baptist Church ===
Saltum Baptist Church
- Saltum Baptistkirke
- 57°16′21″N 9°41′50.28″E
- Location: Saltum, Denmark
- Denomination: Baptism

Saltum Baptist Church is located in Saltum.

=== Zion Church ===
Zion Church
- Zionkirken
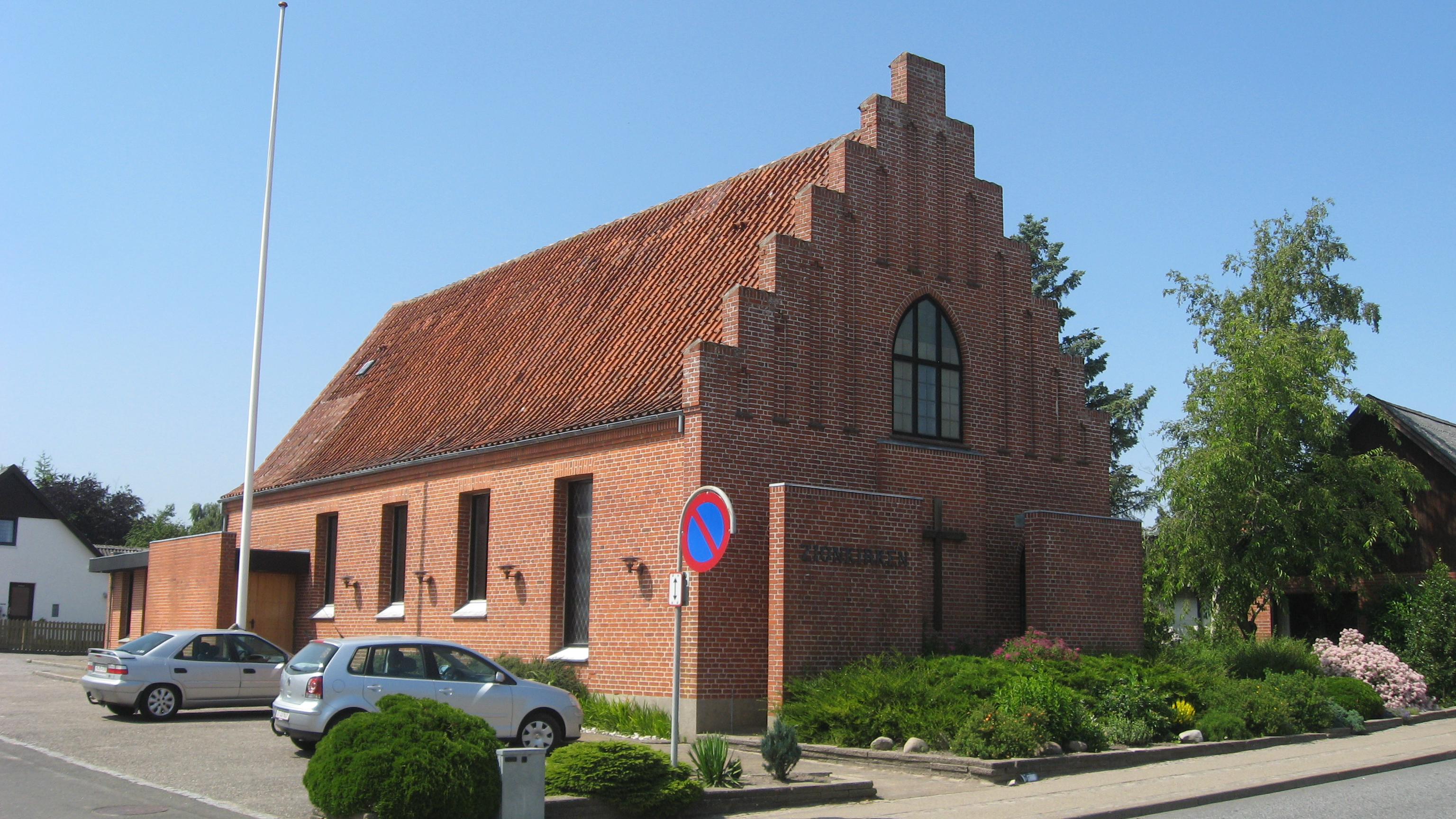
- Zion Church
- 57°5′43.86″N 9°31′27.1″E
- Location: Brovst, Denmark
- Denomination: Evangelicalism

The Zion Church is located in Brovst.
