= Ad Astra Ice Cap (Greenland) =

Ice cap in northeastern Greenland

- Ad Astra Iskappe
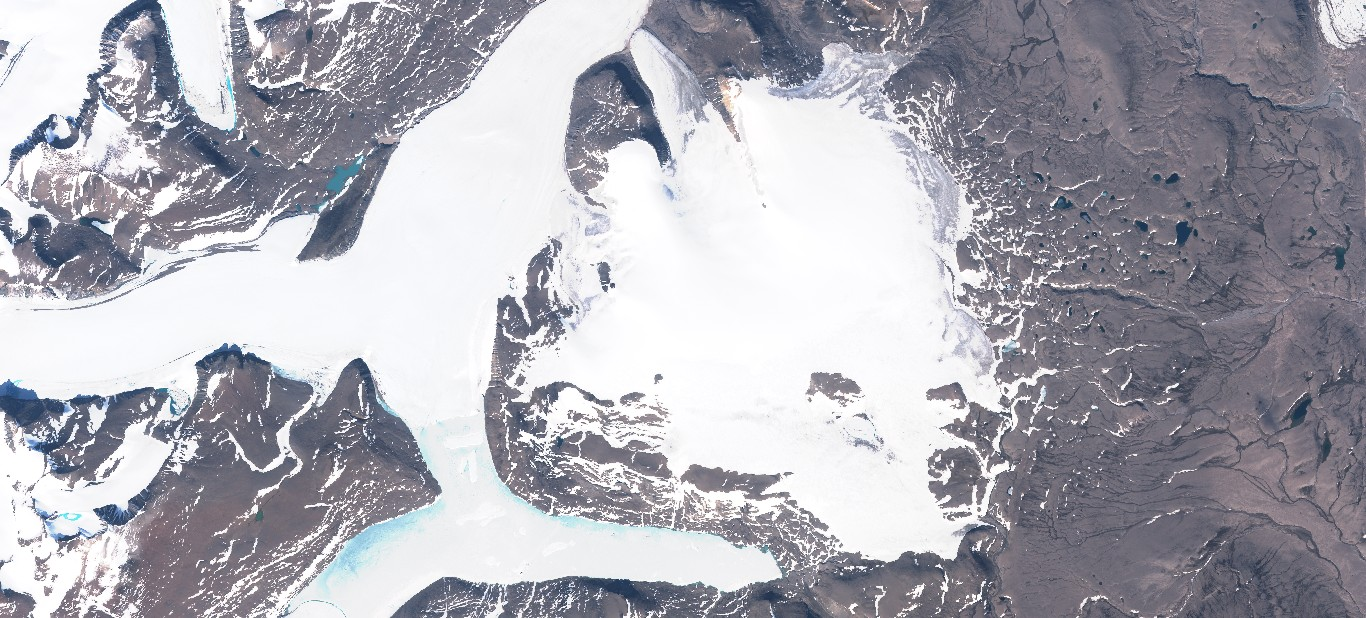
- Ad Astra Ice Cap Sentinel-2 image. The Admiralty Glacier is seen on the upper left.

- Location within Greenland
- Type: Ice cap
- Location: Queen Louise Land
- Coordinates: 77°00′N 24°00′W
- Length: 18 km (11 mi)
- Width: 15 km (9.3 mi)

Ad Astra Ice Cap (Danish: Ad Astra Iskappe) is an ice cap in Queen Louise Land, northeastern Greenland. Administratively it belongs to the Northeast Greenland National Park.

== History ==
The ice cap was mapped during the 1952–54 British North Greenland expedition led by Commander James Simpson. It was named in honor of the Royal Air Force in order to commemorate the air transport supplied to the expedition. The name "Adastra Ice Cap" had been suggested by Brian Roberts, but finally "Ad Astra Ice Cap" became the approved name.

== Geography ==
The Ad Astra Ice Cap is the largest ice cap in Queen Louise Land. It lies in the northern sector, to the east of the lower stretch of the Admiralty Glacier. The Trefork Lake lies to the southwest. The small Gultop Glacier flows to the NNW from the northern end and joins the Admiralty Glacier near its terminus.

== See also ==
- List of glaciers in Greenland
- Queen Louise Land
