= Lindhard Island =

Island in Greenland

Lindhards Ø
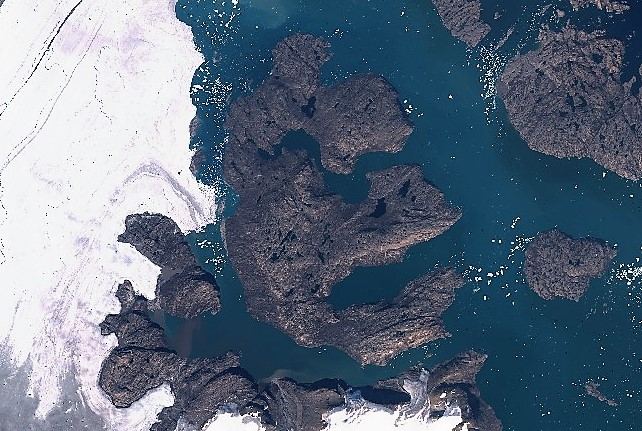
- Lindhard Island Sentinel-2 image

- Location within Greenland

Geography
- Location: Greenland Sea
- Coordinates: 76.51°N 22.14°W
- Area: 263.3 km^{2} (101.7 sq mi)
- Length: 24 km (14.9 mi)
- Width: 16 km (9.9 mi)
- Coastline: 115.5 km (71.77 mi)
- Highest elevation: 417 m (1368 ft)

Administration
- Greenland
- Zone: Northeast Greenland National Park

Demographics
- Population: 0

Lindhard Island (Danish: Lindhard Ø) is an uninhabited island of northeast Greenland.

== History ==
Lindhard Island was visited and explored on March 26, 1913, by the 1912–13 Danish Expedition to Queen Louise Land and Across the North Greenland Ice Sheet led by J.P. Koch. Koch named the island after Johannes Lindhard (1870–1947), the doctor on the 1906–1908 Danmark Expedition. The narrow Kavaler Fjord 76°32′N 22°00′W in the northern part of the island almost divides Lindhard Island in two. Kavaler Fjord was discovered and named by J.P. Koch's 1912–13 expedition. Kavaler Fjord was named after the most stubborn of the expedition's ponies, Kavaler, on their visit to the island on March 26, 1913. Vigfús states that at that time the island had not been visited and was therefore inaccurately placed on the map. Earlier during the expedition, they had named Bag Fjord, which is Danish for Back Fjord, so named because it appeared from back of the island. Bag Fjord is formed between the Bredebrae glacier and the north-west corner of Lindhard Island, 76°37′N 22°16′W.

== Geography ==
The island lies at the western edge of Dove Bay, east of the Bredebrae, the broad glacier producing masses of large icebergs, at the head of Borg Fjord to the north of the island. To the south it is separated from Rechnitzer Land by the Brae Fjord. Kap Stop lies 6 Km to the northeast of Lindhard Island. The Bredebrae is formed by the confluence of two large glaciers east of Queen Louise Land, the Storstrommen flowing from the north and the L. Bistrup Brae from the south. The island has an area of 263.3 km ² and a shoreline of 115.5 kilometres.

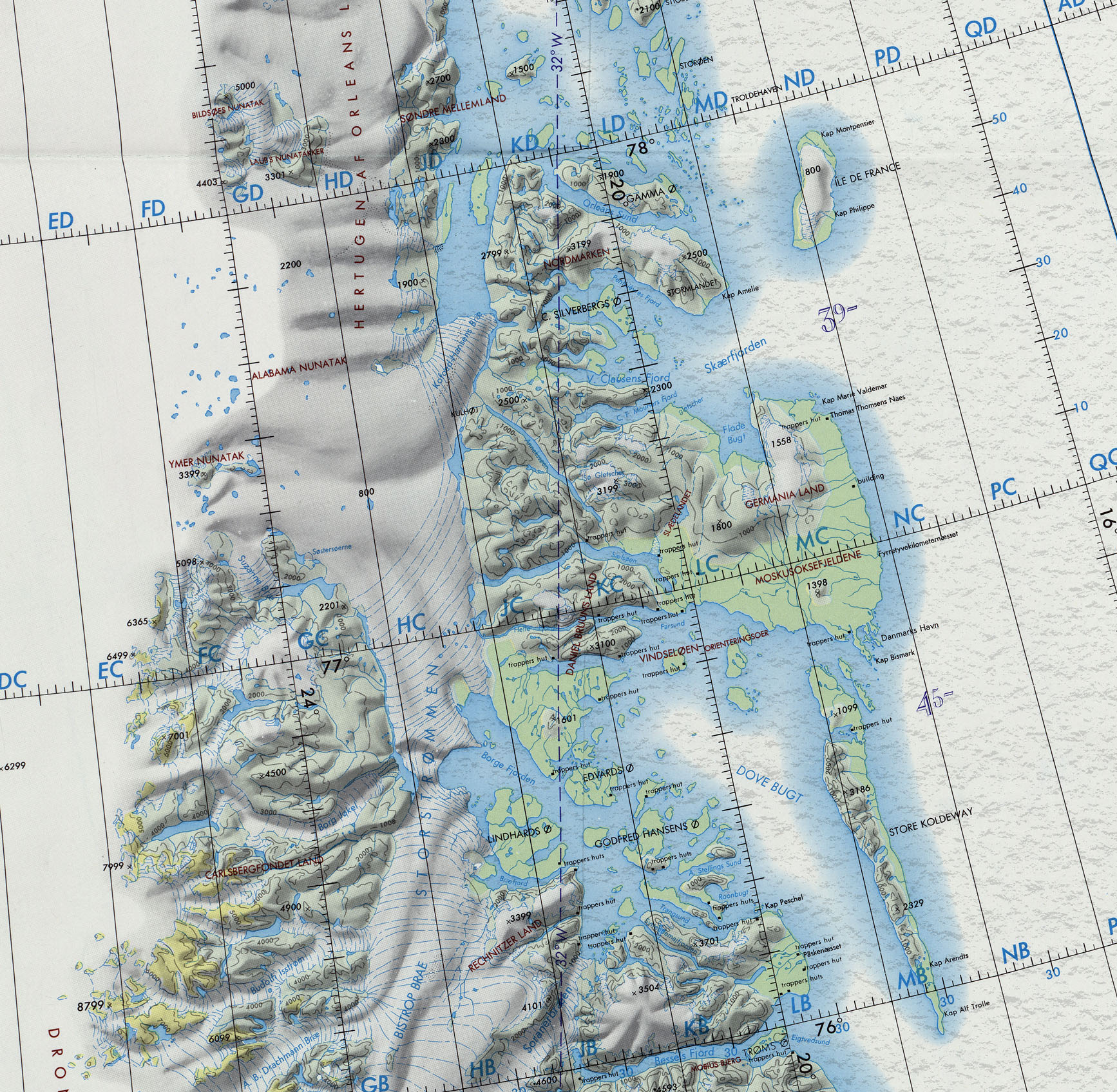
Map of Northeastern Greenland section.

== See also ==
- List of islands of Greenland
