= Britannia Glacier =

Glacier in northeastern Greenland

- Britannia Gletscher
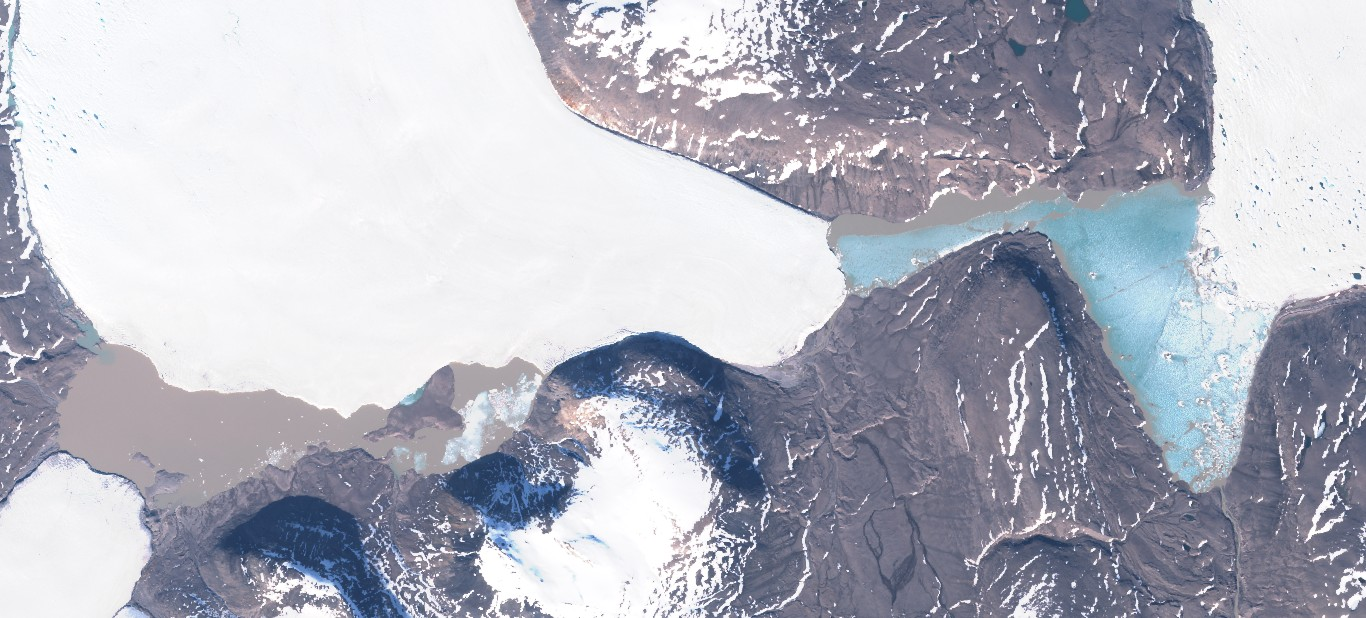
- Southern end of the Britannia Glacier and Britannia Lake Sentinel-2 image. The terminus of the Admiralty Glacier is seen in the lower left.

- Location within Greenland
- Type: Piedmont glacier
- Location: Queen Louise Land
- Coordinates: 77°11′N 24°00′W
- Width: 9 km (5.6 mi)
- Terminus: Britannia Lake

Britannia Glacier (Danish: Britannia Gletscher) is a glacier in Queen Louise Land, northeastern Greenland. Administratively it belongs to the Northeast Greenland National Park.

== History ==
The glacier was mapped during the 1952–54 British North Greenland expedition led by Commander James Simpson. It was named in honour of Britannia. At the time of the expedition the name "Unicorn Glacier" had also been used.

The main base of the British expedition was built close to the southern end of the glacier. In the 1980s the abandoned huts of the field camp were destroyed by a surge of the Britannia Glacier.

== Geography ==
With a width reaching 9 km (5.6 mi), the Britannia Glacier is one of the main glaciers in Queen Louise Land. It flows roughly from north to south in northern Queen Louise Land, to the west of the western edge of the mighty Storstrommen and south of the Suzanne Glacier that flows by the Ymer Nunatak. The glacier has its terminus in the Britannia Lake, located at its southern end. The Admiralty Glacier flows from the southwest into the western end of the lake.

== See also ==
- List of glaciers in Greenland
- Queen Louise Land
