= Britannia Lake =

- Britannia Sø
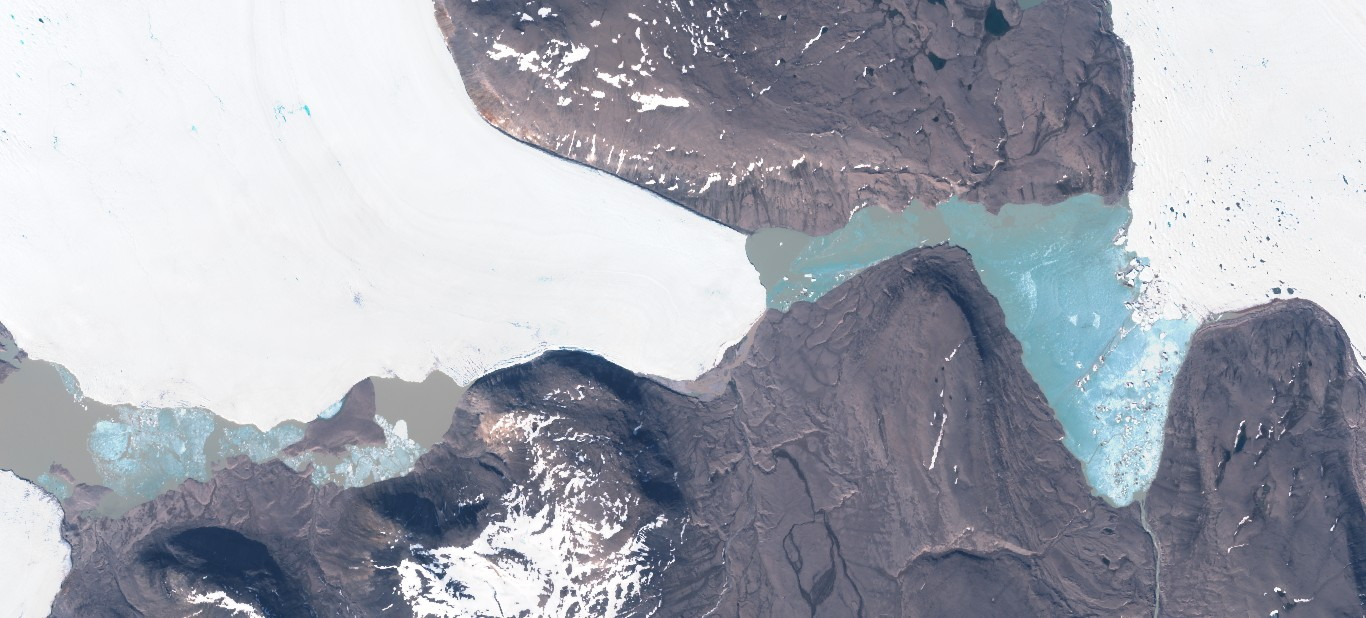
- Britannia Lake Sentinel-2 image

- Location in Greenland
- Location: Queen Louise Land
- Coordinates: 77°08′N 23°24′W
- Type: Lake
- Basin countries: Greenland, Denmark
- Max. length: 20 km (12 mi)
- Max. width: 4 km (2.5 mi)

Britannia Lake (Danish: Britannia Sø), is a lake in King Frederik VIII Land, Northeastern Greenland. The lake and its surroundings are part of the Northeast Greenland National Park zone.

The Danish weather station Danmarkshavn – the only inhabited place in the area – lies about 100 km (62 mi) to the ESE.

== History ==
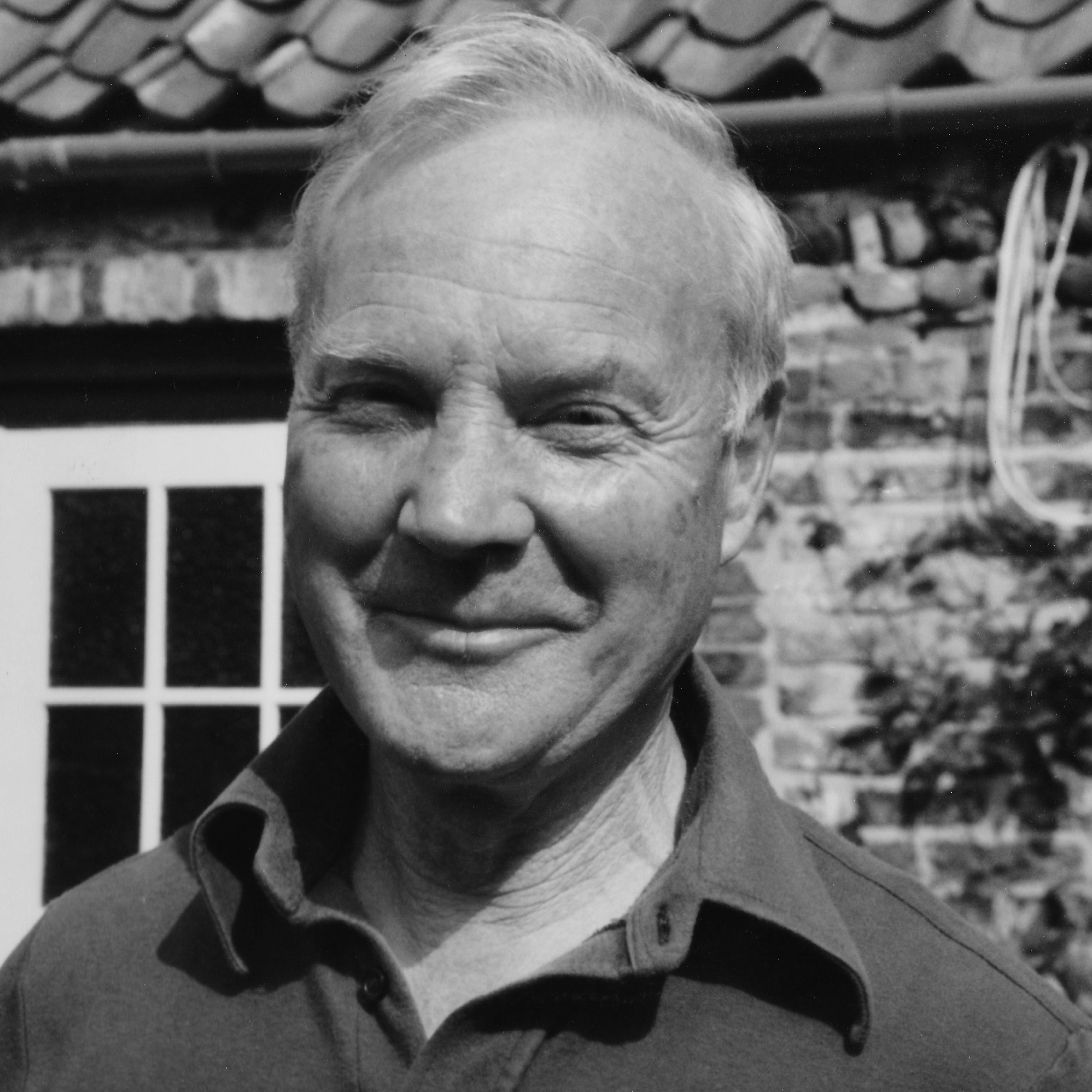
Polar explorer Jim Simpson (1911–2002) who named the lake

The lake was named by Commander James Simpson at the time of the 1952–54 British North Greenland expedition. It had initially been seen, but not surveyed, by the 1906-1908 Danmark expedition. Prior to 1951 the names "Admiralty Lake" and "Slamsøen" had also been used.

The main base of the British expedition was built on the northern shore of the lake and scientific personnel used the location as a base for research in the little explored Queen Louise Land area, as well as further west on the Greenland ice sheet research station North Ice. In the 1980s the abandoned huts of the field camp were destroyed by a surge of the Britannia Glacier.

== Geography ==
Britannia Sø is a large lake at the northern end of Queen Louise Land, to the west of the vast Storstrømmen glacier. The lake is located at the terminus of the Britannia Glacier that flows from the north. The central section of the glacier terminus stays frozen all year round, dividing the unfrozen area of Britannia Lake in two. The surface of the eastern and western ends is usually free of ice in July and August every year. The Strandelv River flows from the south into the bay of the eastern wing of the lake and the Admiralty Glacier flows from the southwest into the western end.

== See also ==
- Cartographic expeditions to Greenland
- List of research stations in the Arctic
