= Admiralty Glacier =

Glacier in northeastern Greenland

- Admiralty Gletscher
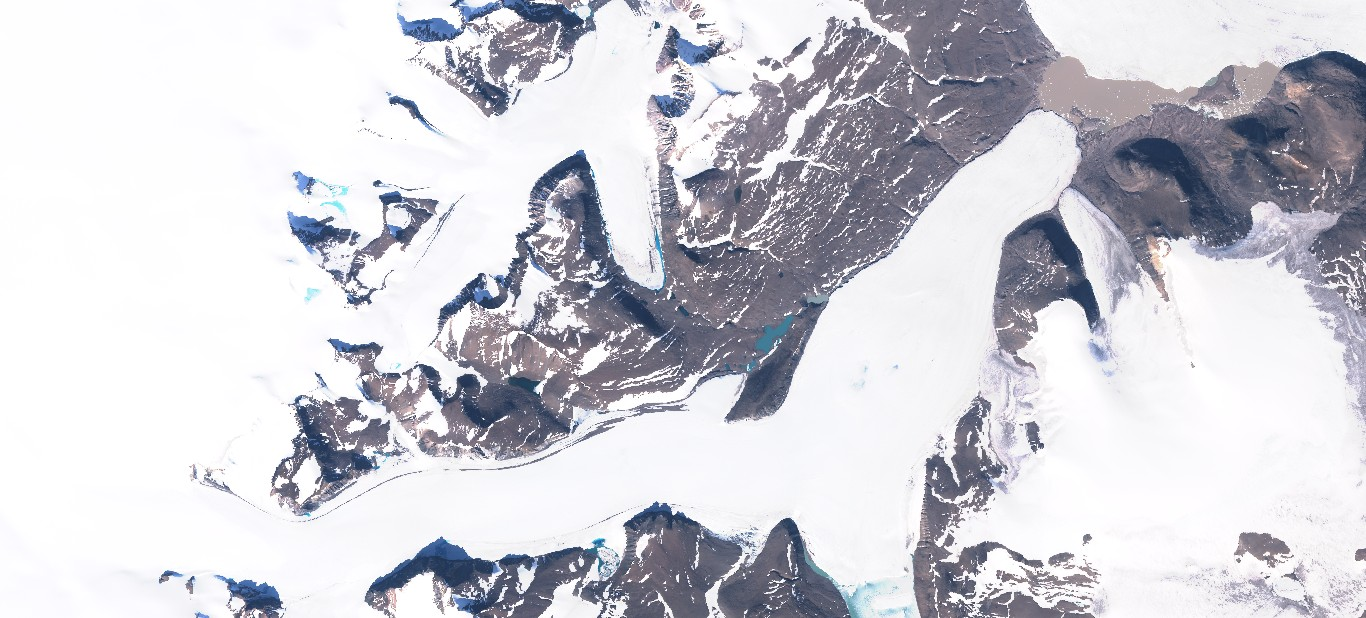
- Admiralty Glacier Sentinel-2 image. The Ad Astra Ice Cap is seen on the lower right.

- Location within Greenland
- Type: Piedmont glacier
- Location: Queen Louise Land
- Coordinates: 77°04′N 24°11′W
- Width: 5 km (3.1 mi)
- Terminus: Britannia Lake

Admiralty Glacier (Danish: Admiralty Gletscher) is a glacier in Queen Louise Land, northeastern Greenland. Administratively it belongs to the Northeast Greenland National Park.

== History ==
The glacier was mapped during the 1952–54 British North Greenland expedition led by Commander James Simpson. It was named after the British Admiralty in order to commemorate the assistance given to the expedition by the Royal Navy.

== Geography ==
The Admiralty Glacier is one of the main glaciers in northern Queen Louise Land. It flows from the Greenland Ice Sheet from west to east the first 20 km (12 mi), slightly bending to the north of Trefork Lake and flowing roughly northeastwards. The Ad Astra Ice Cap lies to the east of its lower stretch. The glacier has its terminus in the Støvdal valley at the Britannia Lake, near the southern end of the Britannia Glacier.

The structure of the cliffs on either side of Admiralty Glacier was examined by the British North Greenland expedition geologists. Expedition member and glaciologist Hal Lister wrote the following from a campsite at the glacier itself:

The striking rock-colours of reds, browns and blacks were edged with snow that was rose-coloured in the fading sun. Ice lakes on the glacier looked beautifully blue, but were very slippery and, in the lakes that filled little basins at the foot of the valley walls, fallen stones looked ominously cold and imprisoned... The whole atmosphere was of gaunt grandeur, terrific and awesome beneath the jagged, pinnacled cliffs.

== See also ==
- List of glaciers in Greenland
- Queen Louise Land
