= North Ice =

Research station in Greenland (1952–1954)

Location within Greenland

North Ice was a research station of the British North Greenland Expedition (1952 to 1954) on the inland ice of Greenland. The coordinates of the station were 78°04′N 38°29′W, at an altitude of 2,341 metres (7,680 ft) above sea level. The British North Greenland Expedition had its main base camp in Britannia Lake, Queen Louise Land. It was led by Commander James Simpson RN. The station recorded a temperature of −66.1 °C (−87.0 °F) on 9 January 1954, which made it the lowest temperature ever recorded in North America up until that time. It was superseded by an observation of −69.6 °C (−93.3 °F) at the Greenland Ice Sheet on 22 December 1991. The name of the station contrasts to the former British South Ice station in Antarctica.

== See also ==
- List of research stations in the Arctic
- Eismitte
- Summit Camp
- NEEM Camp
