= Ymer Nunatak =

Mountain feature in Greenland

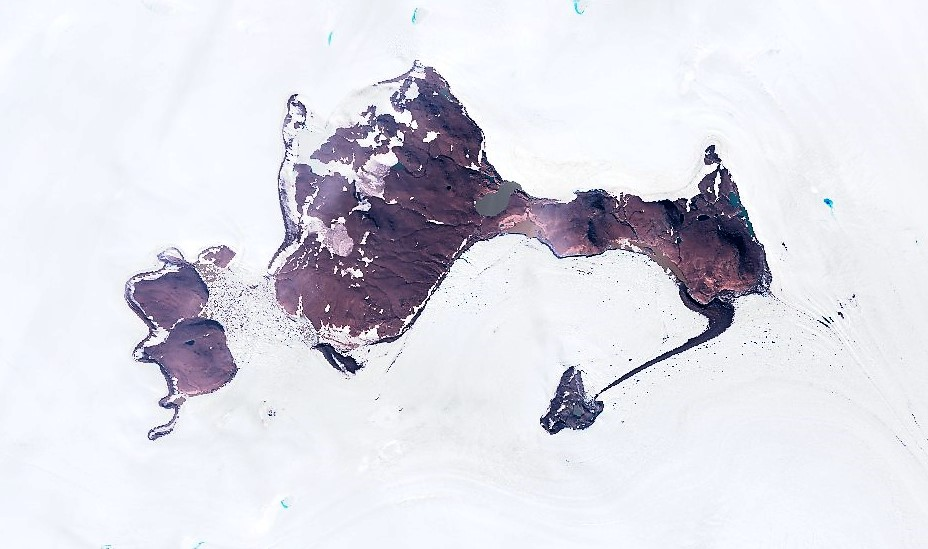
- Ymer Nunatak Sentinel-2 image

Highest point
- Elevation: 1,096 m (3,596 ft)
- Prominence: 234 m (768 ft)
- Coordinates: 77°27′N 24°37′W

Dimensions
- Length: 21 km (13 mi)

Geography
- Location within Greenland
- Location: Queen Louise Land

Ymer Nunatak (Danish: Ymers Nunatak) is a nunatak in the Queen Louise Land area of northeastern Greenland. Administratively it is part of the Northeast Greenland National Park zone.

== History ==
This nunatak was named by the ill-fated 1906–08 Danmark Expedition after Ymir, the giant of Norse mythology.

== Geography ==
Ymer Nunatak is a large nunatak located at the northern end of Queen Louise Land, south of the Alabama Nunatak. The Suzanne Glacier flows to the south and from it flows the Britannia Glacier southwards into main Queen Louise Land. To the west rises the Greenland Ice Sheet and to the east the Storstrommen flows southwards. The narrower eastern section of the nunatak is known as Jaettebringen. Close to the south lies the small Suzanne Nunatak, connected by a moraine to the eastern end of Ymer Nunatak.

== See also ==
- List of mountains in Greenland
- List of nunataks of Greenland
