= Revaltoppe =

Mountain in Greenland

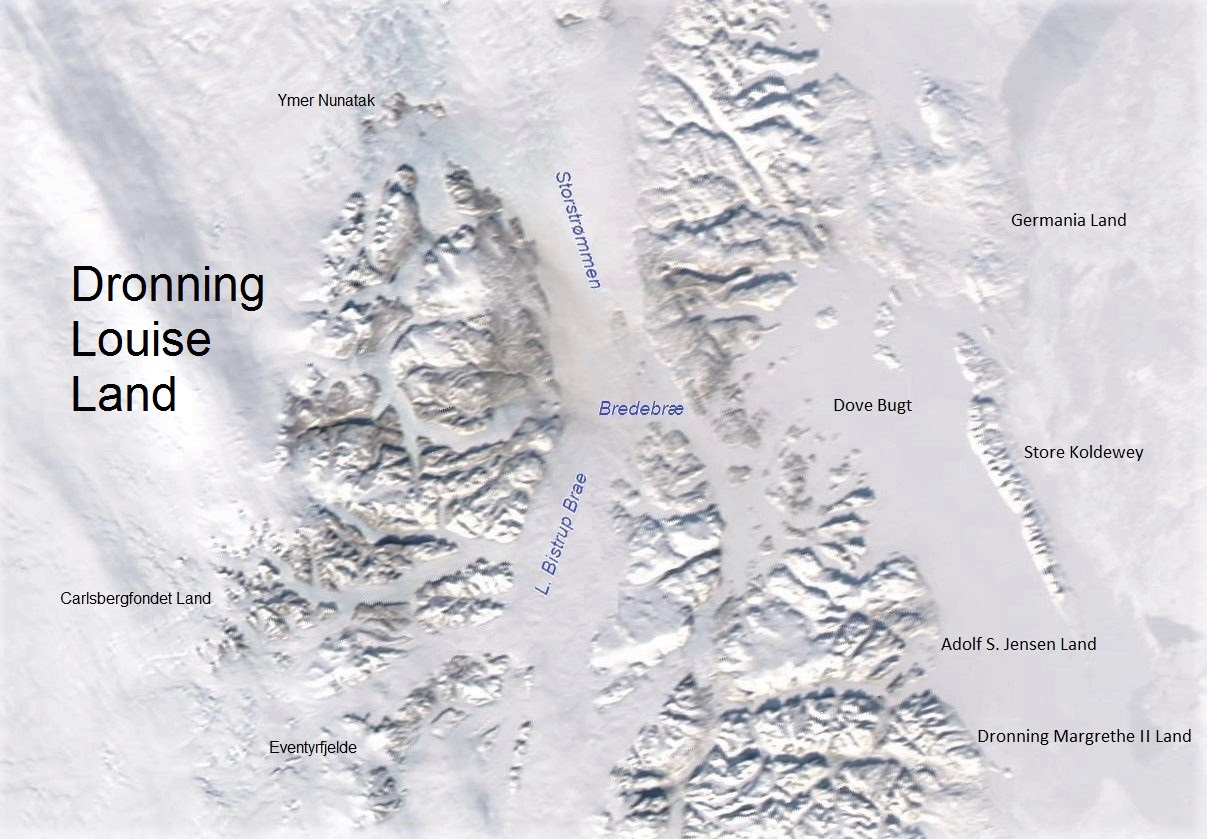
- Queen Louise Land and neighbouring areas

Highest point
- Elevation: 2,317 m (7,602 ft)
- Listing: North America isolated peaks; List of the major 100-kilometer summits of North America
- Coordinates: 76°39′41″N 25°42′28″W

Geography
- Location within Greenland
- Location: Queen Louise Land, Greenland

Revaltoppe is one of the highest mountains in Queen Louise Land, NE Greenland. The peak is located in the King Frederick VIII Land area of northeastern Greenland. Administratively it is part of the Northeast Greenland National Park zone.

This peak was named by J.P. Koch's 1912–13 Danish Expedition to Queen Louise Land after Reval, the historical name of Tallinn, the capital of Estonia, where according to a legend, the Dannebrog (flag of Denmark) is said to have dropped from the sky during a battle between the Danes and the Estonians in 1219.

== Geography ==
Revaltoppe is the highest peak in a group of nunataks to the west of Dannebrogsfjeldene, at the southwestern end of Queen Louise Land (Danish: Dronning Louise Land). The nunatak group was named Reval Toppene or Revaltoppene by J.P. Koch’s 1912–13 Danish Expedition to Queen Louise Land.

Revaltoppe is a 2,317.5-metre-high (7,603 ft) peak. This mountain is marked as a 7,999-foot-high (2,438 m) peak in the Defense Mapping Agency Greenland Navigation charts.

Defense Mapping Agency map of Northeastern Greenland.

== See also ==
- Gefiontinde, Queen Louise Land's highest point
- List of mountain peaks of Greenland
- List of mountains in Greenland
- List of Nunataks#Greenland
