= Carlsbergfondet Land =

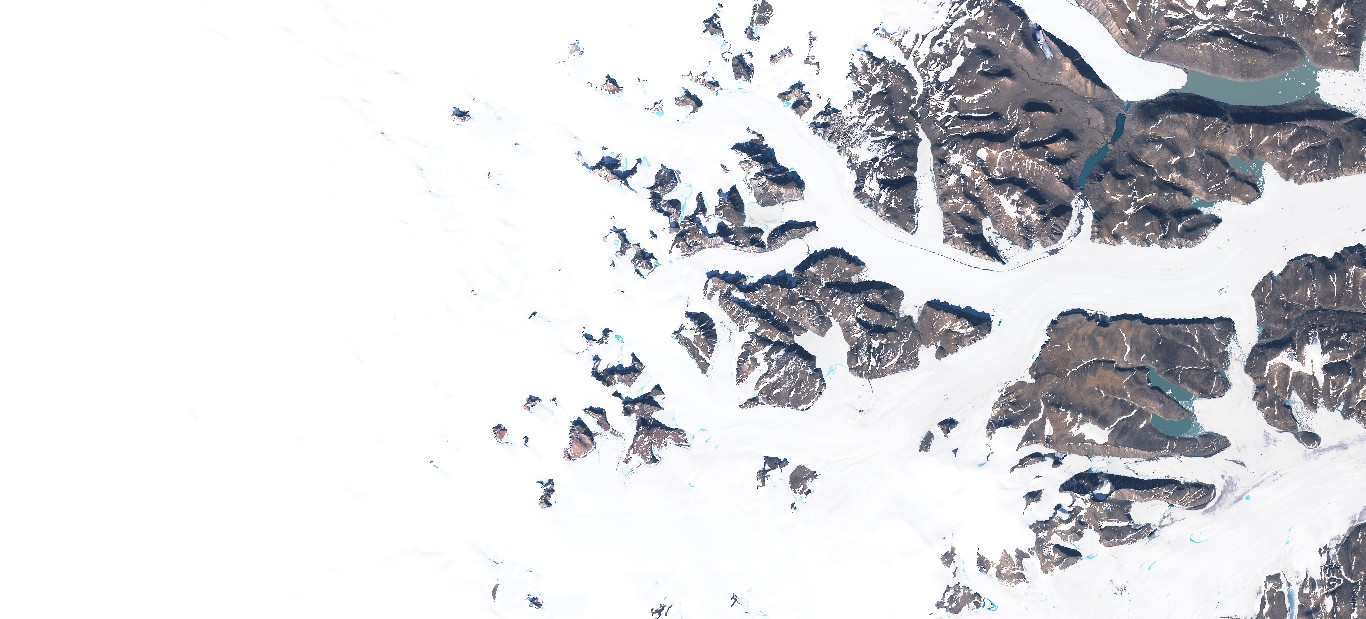
- Carlsbergfondet Land Sentinel-2 image

Highest point
- Peak: Dickens Bjerg
- Elevation: 2,275 m (7,464 ft)

Dimensions
- Length: 35 km (22 mi) E/W
- Width: 27 km (17 mi) N/S

Geography
- Location within Greenland
- Country: Greenland
- Range coordinates: 76°33′N 24°00′W

Carlsbergfondet Land is a group of nunataks in Queen Louise Land, NE Greenland. Administratively it is part of the Northeast Greenland National Park zone.

== History ==
The area was named "Carlsbergfondets Land" during the 1912–13 Danish Expedition to Queen Louise Land led by J.P. Koch. The Carlsberg Foundation (Danish: Carlsbergfondet) had been the most generous single contributor at the time of financing the venture.

In May-June 2007 an expedition led by Russ Hore with Gerwyn Lloyd and Tim Radford climbed some of the peaks of the nunataks rising to the west, as well as in the Eventyrfjelde area to the south.

== Geography ==
Carlsbergfondet Land is a sector at the southwestern end of Queen Louise Land, to the south of the Budolfi Isstrom and to the north of the A.B. Drachmann Glacier. The Ebbe Glacier forms the limit to the east and to the west there are dispersed nunataks until the land ends in the vast, empty Greenland ice sheet.

The highest peak in the nunatak group lies to the northwest and is 2,275-metre-high (7,464 ft). It is erroneously marked as a 8,799-foot-high (2,682 m) peak in the Defense Mapping Agency Greenland Navigation charts.

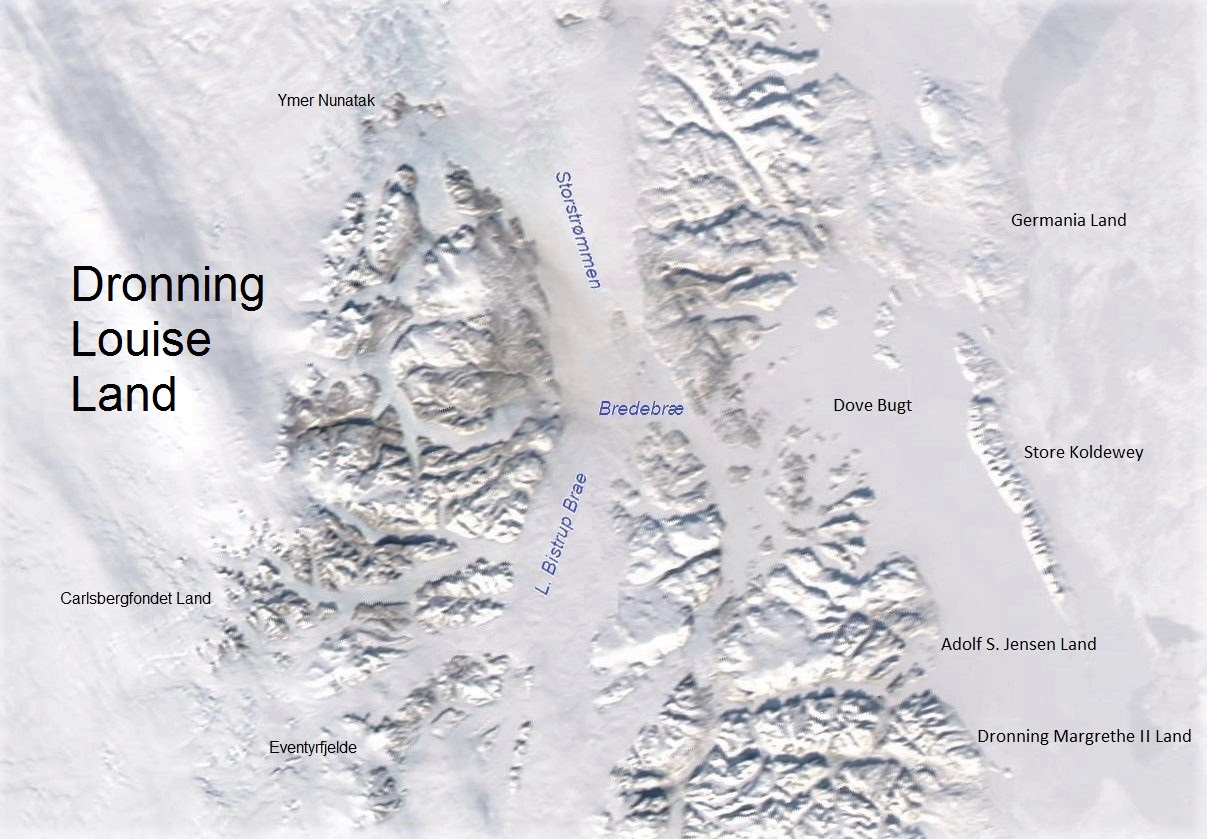
Queen Louise Land and neighbouring areas (annotated).

== See also ==
- List of mountain ranges of Greenland
- List of Nunataks§Greenland
