= Eventyrfjelde =

Nunatak group in Queen Louise Land, Greenland

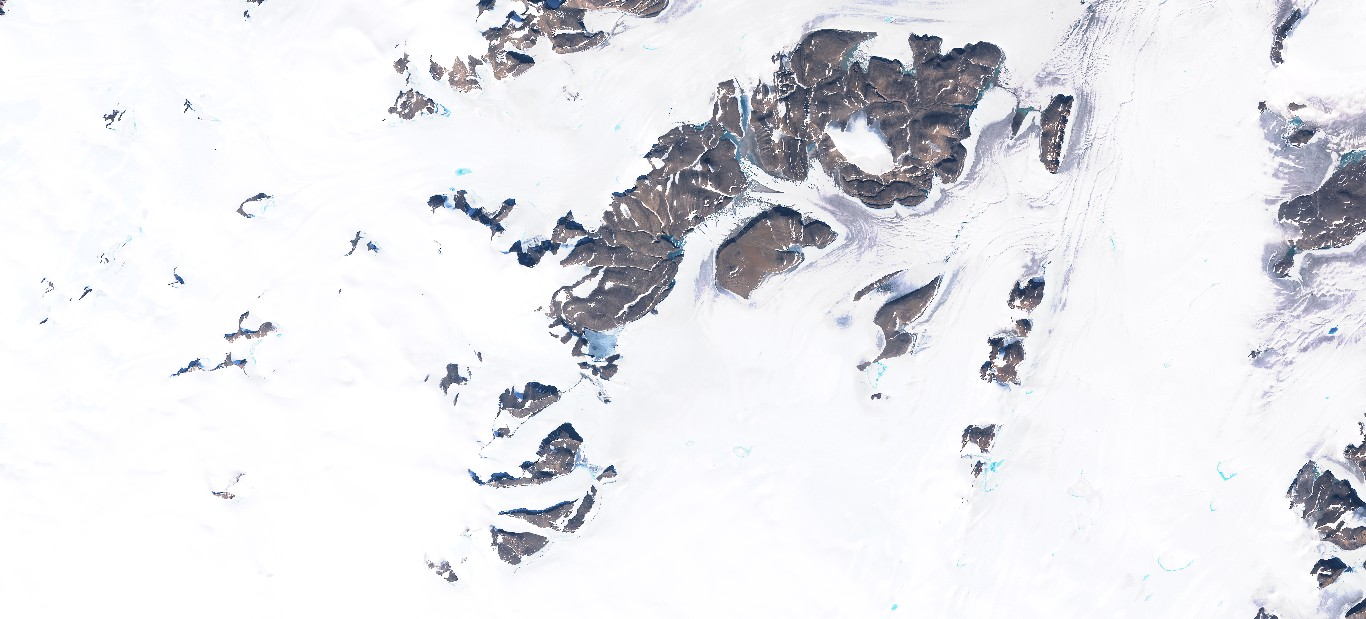
- Eventyrfjelde Sentinel-2 image

Highest point
- Elevation: 2,000 m (6,600 ft)
- Coordinates: 76°05′N 24°22′W

Geography
- Location within Greenland
- Location: Queen Louise Land, Greenland

Eventyrfjelde is a group of nunataks in Queen Louise Land, NE Greenland. Administratively it is part of the Northeast Greenland National Park zone.

== History ==
They were named "Fairy Tale Mountains" (Danish: Eventyrfjelde) by the 1952–54 British North Greenland expedition after the fact that the area where they lie remained obscure and mysterious. Thus, anything that could be said about it was likely to be a fairy tale (Danish: eventyr). The expedition had carried out a very detailed survey of the northern part of Queen Louise Land, but left the southern end practically unexplored.

In May-June 2007 an expedition led by Russ Hore with Gerwyn Lloyd and Tim Radford climbed some of the peaks and to a number of them they gave Welsh names. Also some nunataks in Carlsbergfondet Land to the northwest were climbed.

== Geography ==
The Evertyrfjelde are located at the southern end of Queen Louise Land, to the south of the A.B. Drachmann Glacier. To the east flows the L. Bistrup Brae glacier and to the west lies the vast, empty Greenland ice sheet.

The highest peak in the nunatak group is 2,000-metre-high (6,562 ft) high. This mountain is marked as a 6,700-foot-high (2,042 m) peak in the Defense Mapping Agency Greenland Navigation charts.

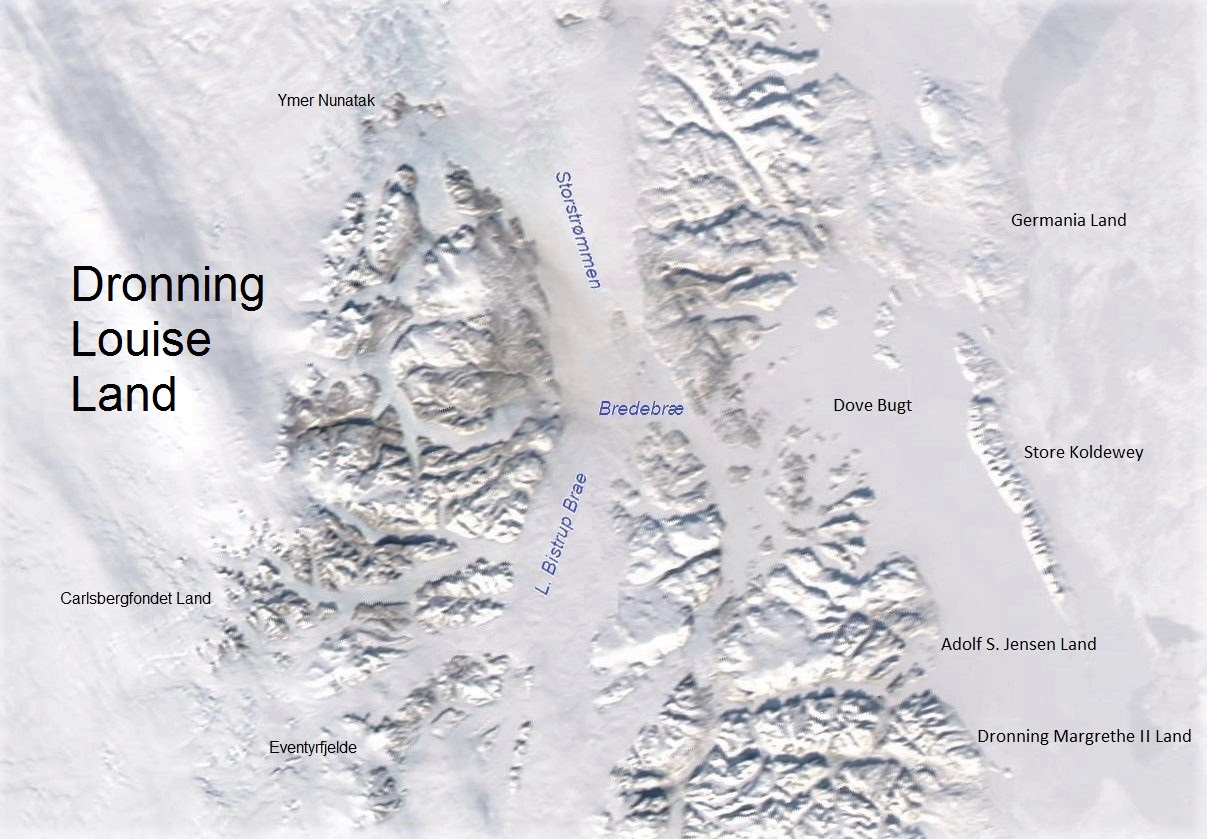
Queen Louise Land and neighbouring areas (annotated).

== See also ==
- List of mountain ranges of Greenland
- List of Nunataks§Greenland
