= Bredebræ =

Glacier in Greenland

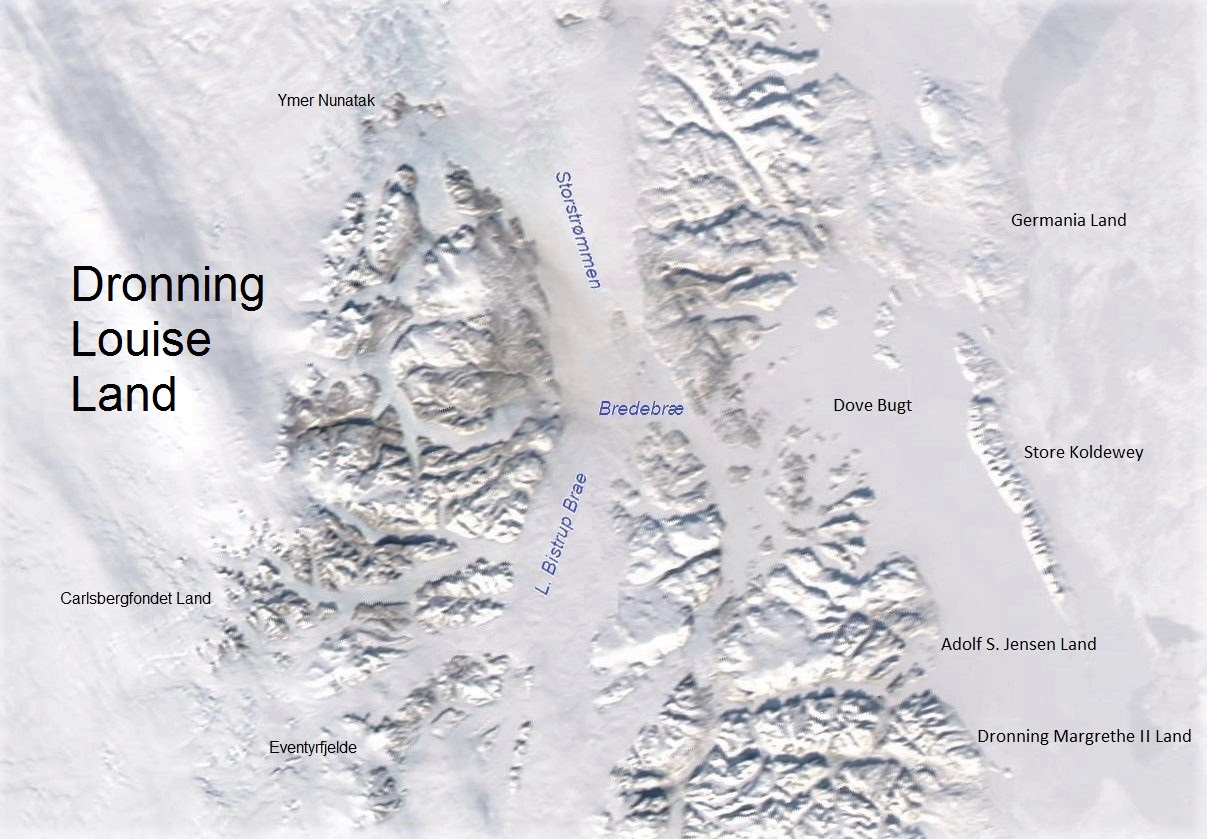
- Bredebræ east of Queen Louise Land.

- Location within Greenland
- Location: Greenland
- Coordinates: 76°36′N 22°50′W
- Width: 27 km (17 mi)
- Terminus: Borg Fjord; North Atlantic Ocean

Bredebræ ("Broad Glacier" in Danish), sometimes also known as "Brede Glacier", is a large glacier in northeastern Greenland. It has its terminus on the east coast of the Greenland ice sheet.

== Geography ==
The mighty Bredebræ is the front or the confluence of two very large glaciers, the Storstrømmen flowing from the north and the L. Bistrup Bræ from the south.

Bredebræ is a broad glacier producing masses of large icebergs with its terminus to the north and west of Lindhard Island at the head of Borg Fjord, west of Dove Bay, Greenland Sea. A huge amount of ice constantly drifts out of the fjord from the glacier, completely clogging the entrance of the fjord with multitude of irregularly-shaped icebergs.

Map of Northeastern Greenland.

== See also ==
- Borgjøkel
- List of glaciers in Greenland
- 1912-1913 Danish Expedition to Queen Louise Land
