= Gefiontinde =

Mountain in Greenland

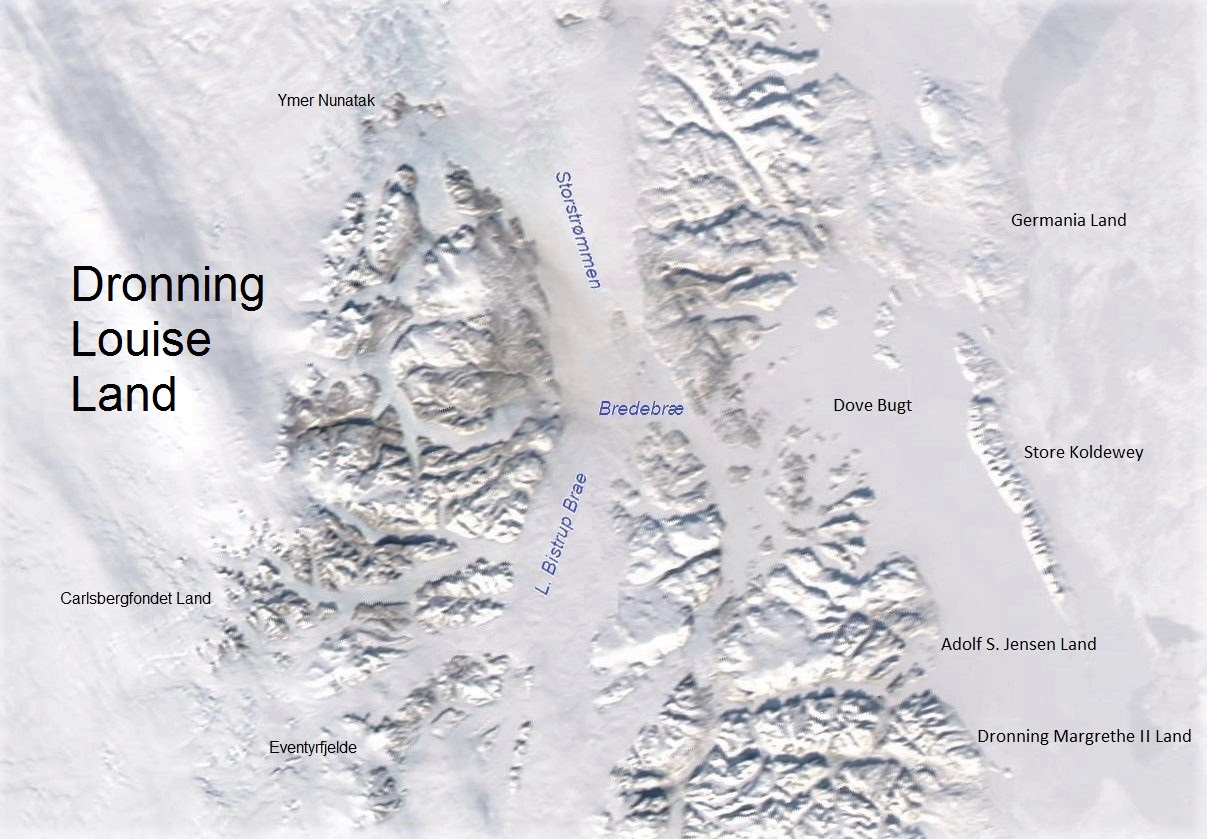
- Queen Louise Land and neighbouring areas (annotated)

Highest point
- Elevation: 2,364 m (7,756 ft)
- Coordinates: 76°28′8″N 25°38′31″W

Geography
- Location within Greenland
- Location: Queen Louise Land, Greenland

Gefiontinde (Gefion Peak) is the highest mountain in Queen Louise Land (Danish: Dronning Louise Land), NE Greenland. The peak is located in the King Frederick VIII Land area of northeastern Greenland. Administratively it is part of the Northeast Greenland National Park zone.

This peak was named after Gefion, the virgin sister of Danish deities who is said to have ploughed the whole Danish island of Zealand (Sjælland) in one night.

== Geography ==
Gefiontinde is the highest peak in a group of peaks named Gefions Tinder or Gefiontinder at the southwestern end of Queen Louise Land, between Pony Glacier and Budolfi Isstrøm. The nunatak group was named Gefions Tinder or Gefiontinder by the 1912–13 Danish Expedition to Queen Louise Land and Across the North Greenland Ice Sheet led by J.P. Koch.

Gefiontinde is a 2,364.3-metre-high (7,757 ft) peak. This mountain is marked as a 8,799-foot-high (2,682 m) peak in the Defense Mapping Agency Greenland Navigation charts.

Defense Mapping Agency map of Northeastern Greenland.

== See also ==
- List of mountains in Greenland
- List of mountain peaks of Greenland
- Revaltoppe, second highest mountain in Queen Louise Land
