= Borgjøkel =

Glacier in northeastern Greenland

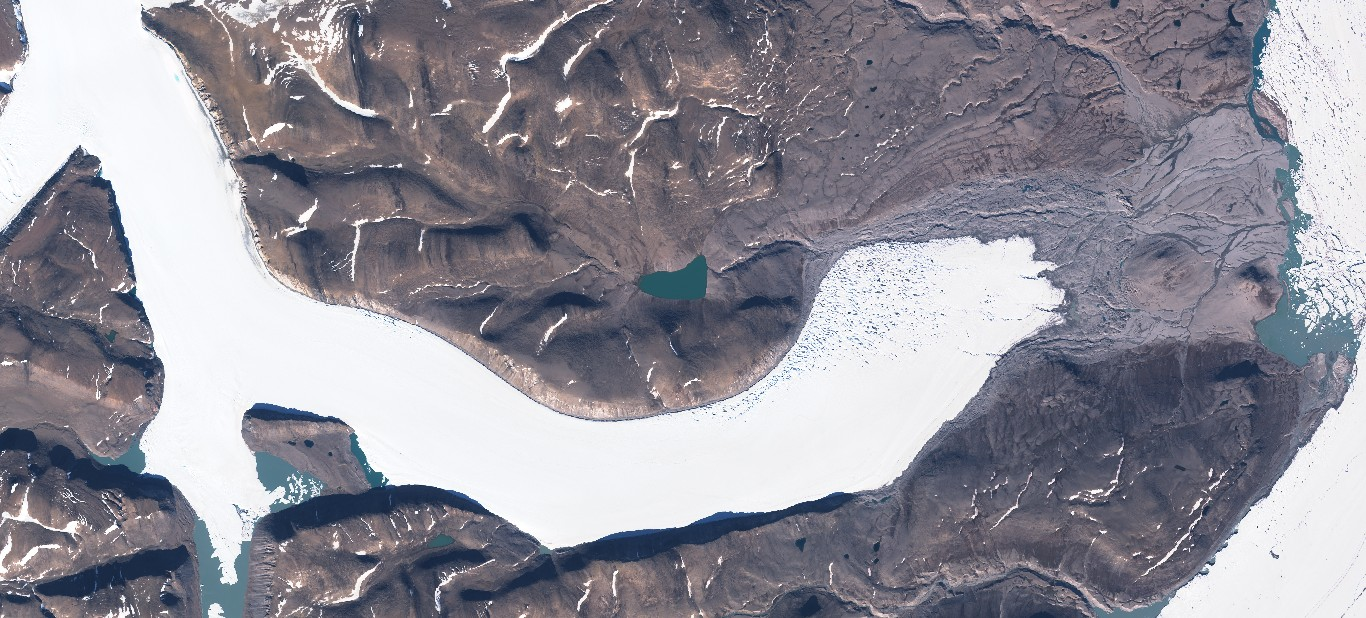
- Borgjøkel Sentinel-2 image.

- Location within Greenland
- Type: Piedmont glacier
- Location: Queen Louise Land
- Coordinates: 76°38′N 23°48′W
- Width: 6.5 km (4.0 mi)
- Terminus: Storstrømmen

Borgjøkel is a glacier in Queen Louise Land, northeastern Greenland. Administratively it belongs to the Northeast Greenland National Park.

== History ==
The glacier was mapped during the 1912–13 Danish Expedition to Queen Louise Land led by J.P. Koch. It was named after the Borg wintering station located close by to the east at 76°42′N 22°24′W. The name had been given by Koch's wife after "Borg", the farm of Egill Skallagrimsson in Iceland.

Jøkel (Icelandic: Jökull) is an old Norse word for glacier. Borgjøkelen was the approved name for many years, but the "en" (definite article) ending has been omitted on recent lists of authorized names.

== Geography ==
Borgjøkel is broad and is one of the main glaciers in central Queen Louise Land. It flows first from the Greenland ice sheet in the west by Trekanten, a 1,910-metre-high (6,266 ft) high nunatak, then past Cloos Klippe, a cliff on the southern side, after which it bends roughly southwards in the Trefork Lake area, then past Kilen, a headland projecting north on the southwestern side of the glacier. At Rosmule, a peninsula on the southern side, it bends to the southeast, and then again to the east. Borgjokel has its terminus near the Storstrømmen in the Bredebræ area at the eastern edge of Queen Louise Land.

== See also ==
- List of glaciers in Greenland
- List of research stations in the Arctic
