= South Ice =

South Ice Station
- Antarctic base
- Location in Antarctica
- Coordinates: 81°57′00″S 29°52′00″W
- Region: Edith Ronne Land
- Established: 1957
- Closed: 1958

Government
  - Type: Administration
  - Body: CTAE, United Kingdom

Population
  - Total: Up to 3
- Active times: All year-round

South Ice was a British support base 560 kilometres (300 nmi) from the South Pole in Edith Ronne Land, Antarctica during the International Geophysical Year, established by Commonwealth Trans-Antarctic Expedition, where three men overwintered during the Antarctic winter of 1957. In the same winter, men overwintered for the first time at the South Pole.

The name of the station contrasts to North Ice which was a British research station in Greenland.

== See also ==
- List of Antarctic research stations
- List of Antarctic field camps
- Crime in Antarctica
