= Eqalugaarsuit Fjord =

Fjord in Greenland

Eqalugaarsuit Sulluat
- "Lakse Fjord"
- Location in Greenland
- Location: Arctic
- Coordinates: 72°30′N 54°55′W
- River sources: Lakse Elv
- Ocean/sea sources: Baffin Bay
- Basin countries: Greenland
- Max. length: 30 km (19 mi)
- Max. width: 4 km (2.5 mi)
- Settlements: 0

Eqaluarssuit Fjord (Danish: Laksefjorden) is a fjord in Greenland. It is located in the Upernavik Archipelago.

== See also ==
- Danish Expedition to Queen Louise Land
- List of fjords of Greenland
