= Trefork Lake =

- Trefork Sø
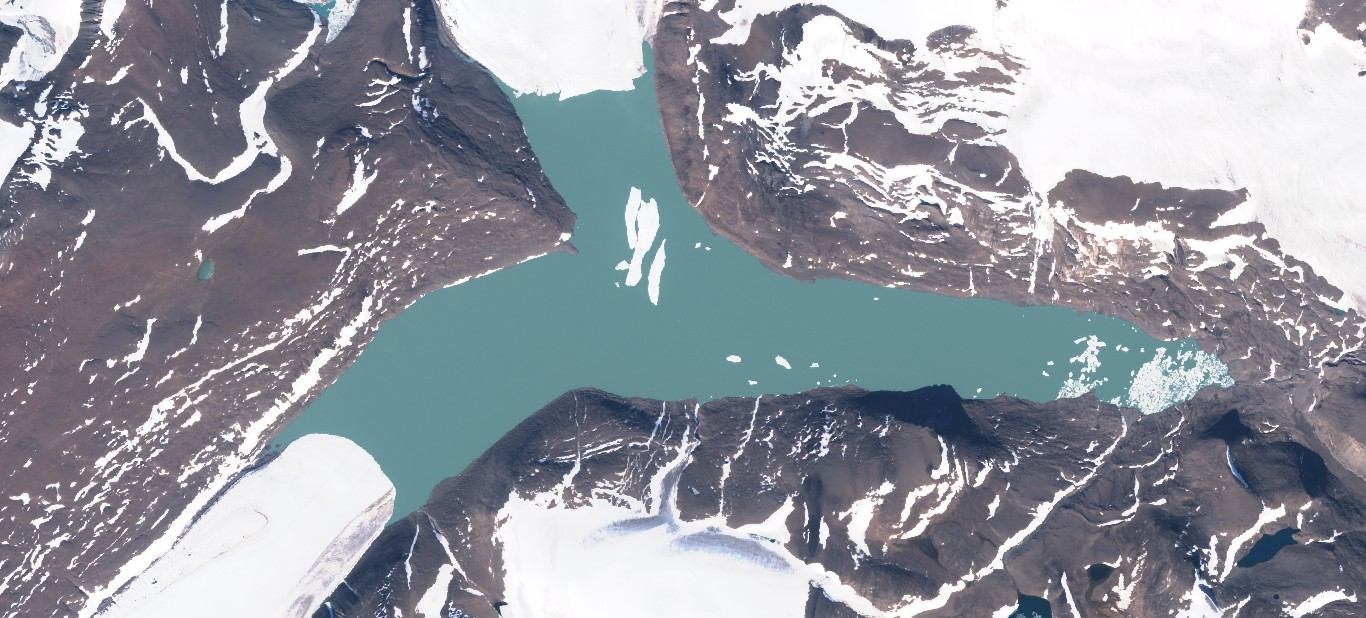
- Trefork Lake Sentinel-2 image

- Location in Greenland
- Location: Queen Louise Land
- Coordinates: 76°55′N 24°17′W
- Type: Lake
- Primary inflows: Trefork Glacier
- Basin countries: Greenland, Denmark
- Max. length: 16 km (9.9 mi)
- Max. width: 3.2 km (2.0 mi)

Trefork Lake (Danish: Trefork Sø), is a lake in King Frederik VIII Land, Northeastern Greenland. The lake and its surroundings are part of the Northeast Greenland National Park zone.

The Danish weather station Danmarkshavn —the only inhabited place in the area— lies about 100 km (62 mi) to the east.

== History ==
The lake was named "Trident Lake" (Danish: Trefork Sø) by the 1952–54 British North Greenland expedition because of its shape.

== Geography ==
Trefork Sø is the largest lake in the northern part of Queen Louise Land. The lake is located between the large Admiralty and Borgjokel glaciers. The terminus of the smaller Trefork Glacier is at the southwestern end. The Ad Astra Ice Cap rises to the northeast.

== See also ==
- Cartographic expeditions to Greenland
