= Colin Bull =

British explorer and geologist

- Born: Colin Bruce Bradley Bull; 13 June 1928; Hereford
- Died: 7 September 2010 (aged 82); Died at sea
- Education: University of Birmingham
- Scientific career
- Fields: glaciology, science administration
- Workplaces: University of Cambridge, Victoria University of Wellington, Ohio State University
- Thesis: The nature of electron traps in luminescent materials (1951)

Colin Bull (1928–2010) was an English glaciology academic and polar explorer. He was the director of the Institute of Polar Studies who approved the first all-women scientific team to the Antarctic and was awarded the Polar Medal in 1954 and the US Antarctica Service Medal in 1968.

== Academic career ==
After a PhD titled ' The nature of electron traps in luminescent materials' at the University of Birmingham, Bull moved to the University of Cambridge, Victoria University of Wellington and finally Ohio State University.

Bull died on 7 September 2010 while on a ship en route to Alaska.

Bull's book collection is held as the 'Colin Bull Collection' at Victoria University of Wellington and his oral history at Ohio State University.

== Selected works ==
- Colin Bull (2005), Innocents in the Arctic: The 1951 Spitsbergen Expedition (First ed.), University of Alaska Press, p. 272, OL 8908202W, Wikidata Q140075292
- Colin Bull (2009), Innocents in the Dry Valleys: An Account of the Victoria University of Wellington Antarctic Expedition, 1958-59 (First ed.), Te Herenga Waka University Press, p. 267, OCLC 309256291, OL 37479695W, Wikidata Q140075224
- C. S. Wright (1993). Colin Bull (ed.). Silas : the Antarctic diaries and memoir of Charles S. Wright. Ohio State University Press. ISBN 978-0-8142-0548-8. OCLC 25550272. Wikidata Q140075318.
- Colin Bull; Michael E. Lipschutz (1983), Workshop on Antarctic Glaciology and Meteorite, LPI technical report, Houston: Lunar and Planetary Institute, OCLC 13852848, Wikidata Q97733269
- Colin Bull (1 August 1969). "The 1978–1980 surge of the Sherman Glacier, south-central Alaska". Canadian Journal of Earth Sciences. 6 (4): 841–843. Bibcode:1969CaJES...6..841B. doi:10.1139/e69-084. ISSN 1480-3313. Wikidata Q109566146.
- J. M. Palais; I. M. Whillans; C. Bull (1982). "Snow Stratigraphic Studies At Dome C, East Antarctica: An Investigation Of Depositional and Diagenetic Processes". Annals of Glaciology. 3: 239–242. Bibcode:1982AnGla...3..239P. doi:10.1017/s0260305500002846. ISSN 0260-3055. Wikidata Q109903264.
- Lonnie G. Thompson; Wayne L. Hamilton; Colin Bull (1975). "Climatological, Implications of Microparticle Concentrations in the Ice Core From "Byrd" Station, Western Antarctica". Journal of Glaciology. 14 (72): 433–444. doi:10.3189/s0022143000021948. ISSN 0022-1430. Wikidata Q138297267.
