= British North Greenland expedition =

British scientific mission to Greenland (1952–1954)

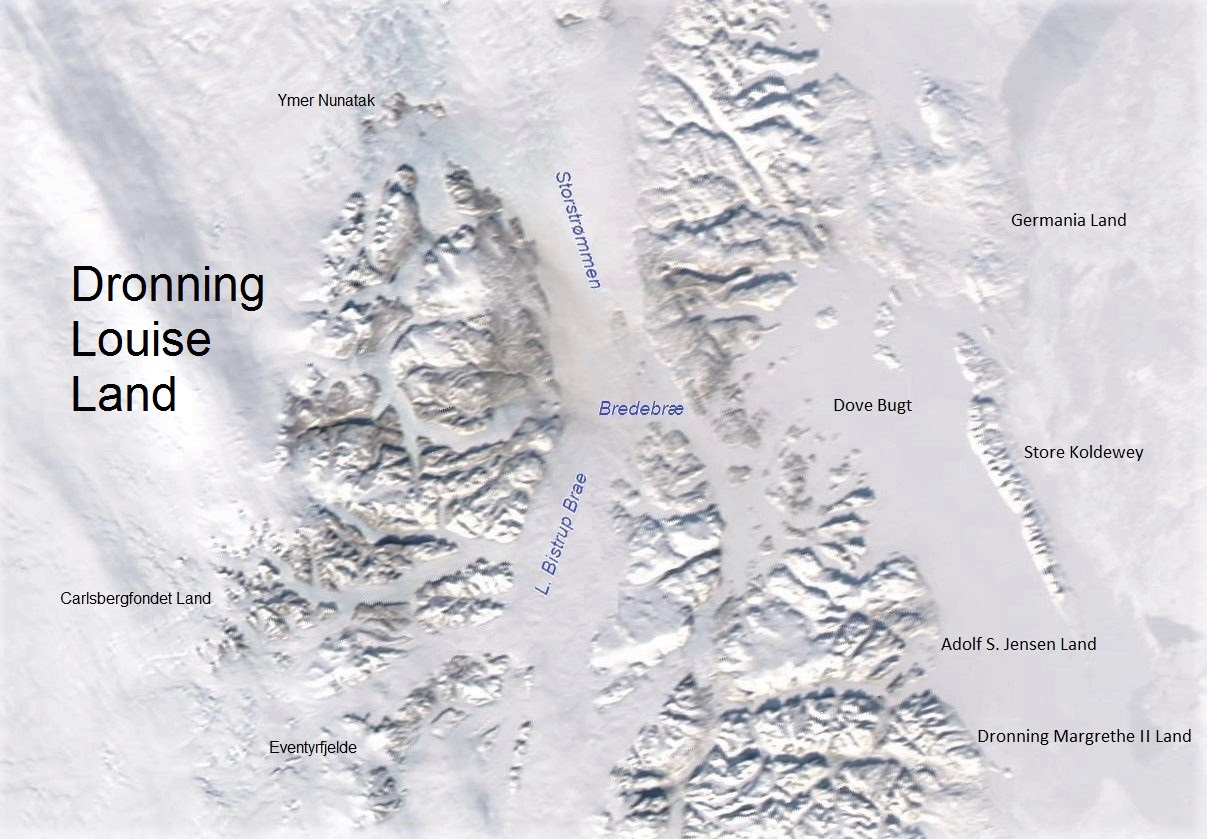
Queen Louise Land and some of the neighbouring areas explored by the BNGE.

The British North Greenland expedition was a British scientific mission, led by Commander James Simpson RN, which lasted from July 1952 to August 1954. A total of 30 men took part, though not all stayed for both years.

The purpose of BNGE was primarily to carry out scientific studies in glaciology, meteorology, geology and physiology. Gravimetric and seismological surveys were made, and radio wave propagation was also studied from their station codenamed "North Ice". It also provided information useful to the Armed Forces about operating in Arctic environments, and the majority of the team were serving members. Travel over the icecap was either on foot, by dog sled, or by M29 Weasel tracked vehicles. Expedition members also made pioneering ascents in the Barth Mountains and Queen Louise Land.

== History ==
Simpson made a preparatory exploration in 1951. A Short Sunderland flying boat landed in Seal Lake and from there Simpson walked across Storstrommen to Queen Louise Land. There he found an ice-free glacial lake that would be a suitable place for landing and he named it Britannia Lake (Britannia Sø) after the future expedition. The exploration team stayed three weeks in the area, following which the Sunderland returned to bring the party back to Britain.

In July 1952 the expedition sailed from Deptford aboard the former Norwegian sealer Tottan, while another cargo ship, loaded with four Weasel tracked vehicles, sailed from Hull. The expedition team consisted of 25 men; fifteen from the armed services and the merchant navy, nine civilian scientists, and a Danish army officer. After collecting sledge dogs in south-west Greenland, the two ships sailed to Young Sund in the north-east coast. From there RAF Sunderland flying-boats airlifted the expedition to Britannia Lake in Queen Louise Land and set up the main base camp of the expedition. Commander Simpson then led a party on dog sleds to establish the North Ice station about 230 miles (370 km) to the west. The Weasels were landed on the coast and drove the 100 miles inland as far as the base camp.

Once the party arrived at the site of North Ice, their stores and equipment, more than 86 tons of it, were air-dropped from two RAF Handley Page Hastings transport aircraft, flying from Thule. During the supply operation, on 16 September 1952, Hastings No. WD492 of 47 Squadron, having already made a series of parachute drops, was making the second in series of free fall drops at an altitude of only 50 feet (15 m), when it was caught in a white-out, and made a forced belly landing. Three members of the crew were injured, and sheltered in the intact fuselage of the aircraft until air-lifted out by a Grumman HU-16 Albatross of the United States Air Force. The rest of the crew were recovered two days later by a rocket assisted USAF Douglas C-47.

In early 1953 glaciological studies began, while seismic and gravimetric teams worked between North Ice and Britannia Sø. Observations were continued throughout the second winter, and in 1954 a party traversed the ice cap from North Ice to Thule. Attempts to measure the thickness of the ice sheet by seismic soundings failed, but markers placed on the ice, enabled information about the movement of the ice sheet and the accumulation of snow to be gathered. At North Ice ice cores to a depth of 14 metres (46 ft) were recovered.

The expedition suffered its only fatality in 1953, when Captain H. A. Jensen of the Danish Army, a qualified surveyor, fell to his death on a steep snow slope.

In August 1953, the expedition was re-supplied by sea and air, and eight team members, who had signed on for only one year, left to be replaced by five more. The expedition returned to England by ship in August 1954.

The entire expedition team were awarded the Polar Medal in November 1954, while Commander Simpson was also presented with the Patron's Medal from the Royal Geographical Society in 1955, and was made a Commander of the Order of the British Empire (CBE) on 2 January 1956.

In the 1980s the abandoned huts of the expedition field camp were destroyed by a surge of the Britannia Glacier.

== Temperatures ==
During the expedition temperatures below −59.4 °C (−75 °F) were recorded at North Ice on 16 occasions, and on 9 January 1954, a record low value of −66.1 °C (−87 °F) was recorded.

== Expedition members ==
The members of the expedition were:

- Captain Michael Edward Borg Banks, Royal Marines, Officer-in-Charge of a vehicle team.
- Instructor Lieutenant-Commander Richard Brett-Knowles, BA, Royal Navy, Assistant Scientist and Radio Officer, Second Year.
- Lieutenant Francis Richard Brooke, Royal Navy, Surveyor.
- Colin Bruce Bradley Bull, PhD, BSc, Geophysicist and Senior Scientist, Second Year.
- Chief Petty Officer Herbert Randle Dean, Senior Radio Operator.
- Lieutenant Angus Bruce Erskine, Royal Navy, Officer-in-Charge of sledge dogs.
- Edward Owen Jones, Chief Officer, Merchant Navy, Officer-in-Charge central ice-cap station, and vehicle team.
- Harold Lister, Senior Glaciologist.
- Surgeon Lieutenant John Potter Masterton, MB, ChB, Royal Navy Volunteer Reserve, Medical Officer.
- Ronald William Moreton, Chief Officer, Merchant Navy, Stores and Equipment Officer.
- Staff Sergeant John William Oakley, Corps of Royal Electrical and Mechanical Engineers, Vehicle Mechanic.
- Instructor Lieutenant Graham Rollitt, BA, Royal Navy, Meteorologist and Second-in Command, Second Year.
- Commander Cortlandt James Woore Simpson, DSC, BSc, Royal Navy, Expedition Leader.
- Petty Officer Telegraphist Kenneth Earl Taylor, Radio Operator.
- Peter Francis Taylor, Assistant Glaciologist.
- Peter John Wyllie, Geologist.

=== First year only ===
- Captain John Stanley Agar, Royal Corps of Signals, Radio Officer.
- Acting Quartermaster Sergeant Sidney Peter Boardman, Corps of Royal Electrical and Mechanical Engineers, Vehicle Mechanic.
- George Frederick Cadd, Seismic Operator.
- Richard Alexander Hamilton, FRSE MA, Chief Scientist and Second-in-Command.
- Captain Hans A. Jensen, Danish Army, Surveyor. (Died 1953).
- James Douglas Peacock, Senior Geologist.
- Charles George Malcolm Slesser, Assistant Physicist and Surveyor.
- Harold Ellis Lewis, Physiologist.
- Captain James Douglas Walker, Corps of Royal Engineers, Officer-in-Charge of vehicles.

=== Second year only ===
- Keith Charles Arnold, Surveyor.
- Robert John Maurice Bruce, Seismic Operator.
- Captain George Raymond Fletcher, Corps of Royal Engineers, Member of a vehicle team.
- Warrant Officer Class II Desmond Edgar Lemuel Homard, Corps of Royal Electrical and Mechanical Engineers, Vehicle Mechanic.
- William Stanley Bryce Paterson, Physicist.

== See also ==
- Cartographic expeditions to Greenland
- List of research stations in the Arctic
