= L. Bistrup Bræ =

Glacier in northeastern Greenland

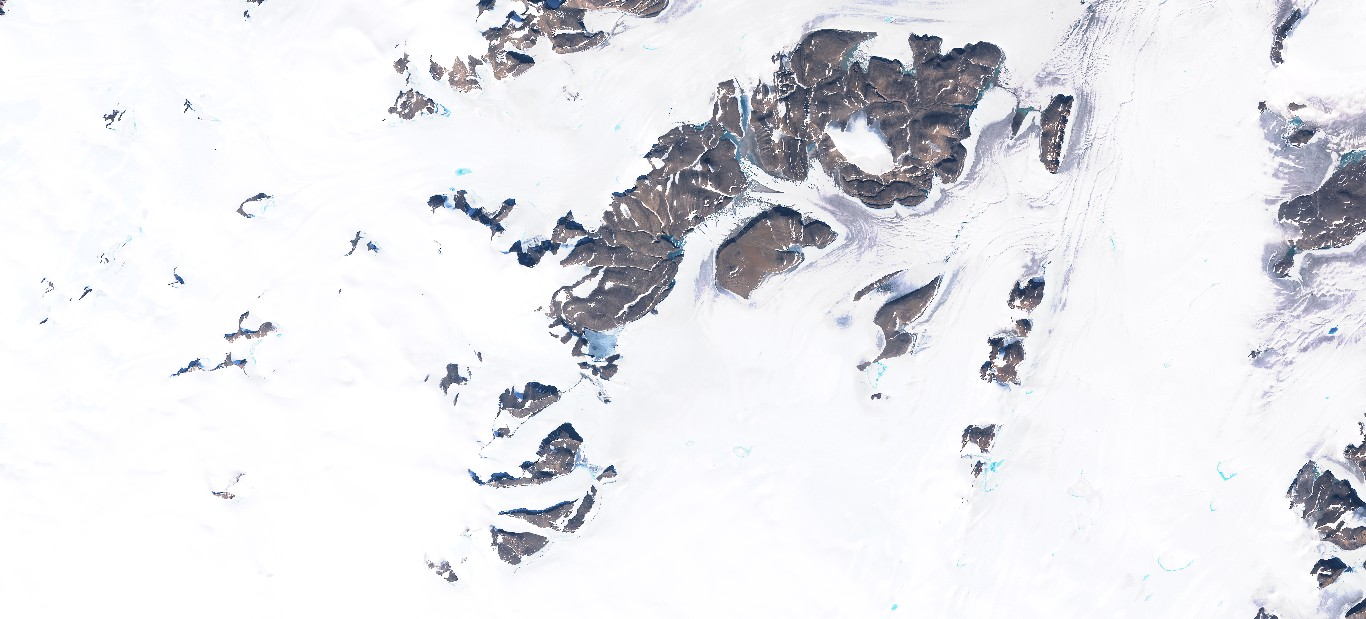
- L. Bistrup Bræ to the right, east of the Eventyrfjelde.

- Location within Greenland
- Type: Piedmont glacier
- Location: Queen Louise Land
- Coordinates: 76°15′N 23°15′W
- Width: 18 km (11 mi)
- Terminus: Borg Fjord through Bredebræ; North Atlantic Ocean

L. Bistrup Bræ is a glacier in Northeastern Greenland. Administratively it belongs to the Northeast Greenland National Park.

== History ==
The glacier was first mapped during the 1906–08 Danmark Expedition. It was named by expedition member Henning Bistrup as L. Bistrupsbræ, after his father Lauritz Hans Christian Bistrup (1850– 914).

== Geography ==
L. Bistrup Bræ is one of the main glaciers in the area. It flows roughly northwards from the northeastern limits of the Greenland Ice Sheet between southern Queen Louise Land to the west and Rechnitzer Land to the east. The A.B. Drachmann Glacier and the Budolfi Isstrom join it from the west. Its breadth can reach 18 km (11 mi), slightly bending to the NNE in its last stretch. The glacier has its terminus in the Borg Fjord through the Bredebræ, near the southern end of Storstrømmen.

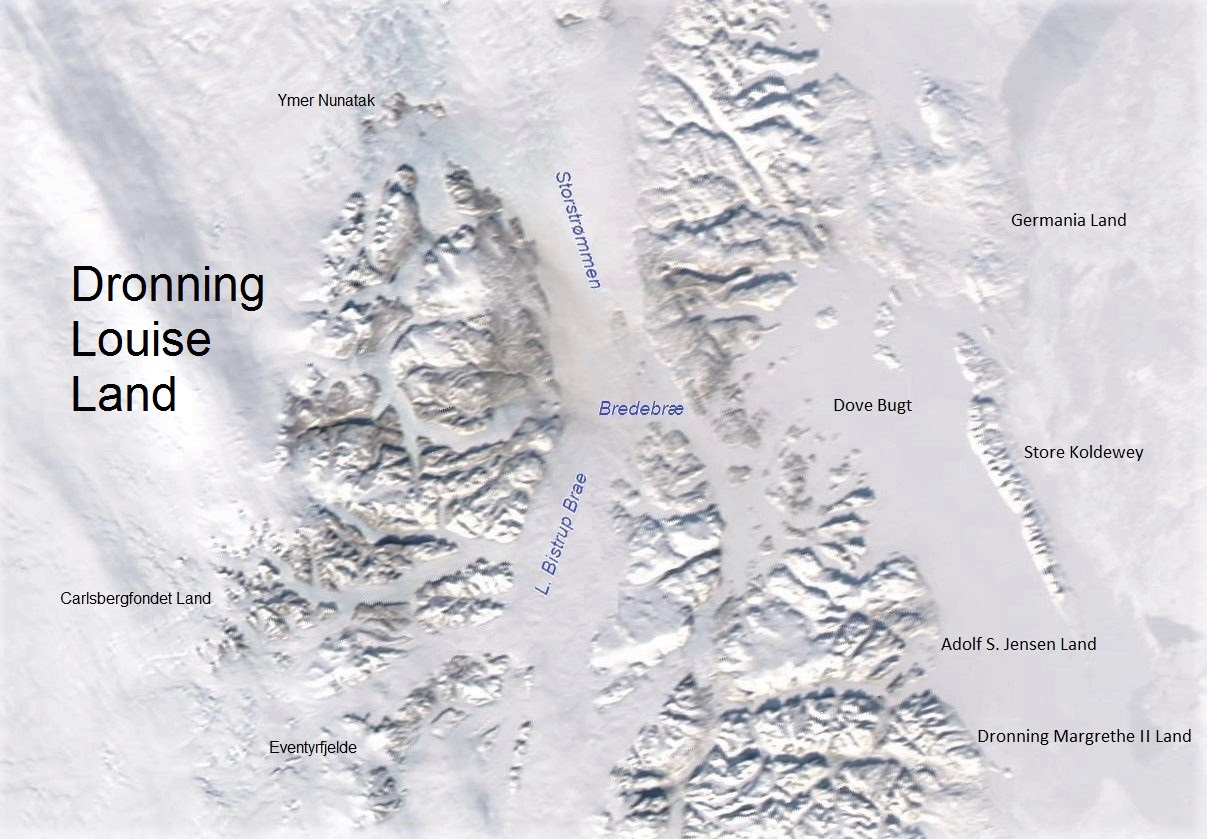
Queen Louise Land and neighbouring areas (annotated)

== See also ==
- List of glaciers in Greenland
- Queen Louise Land
