= Storstrømmen (Greenland) =

Glacier in Greenland

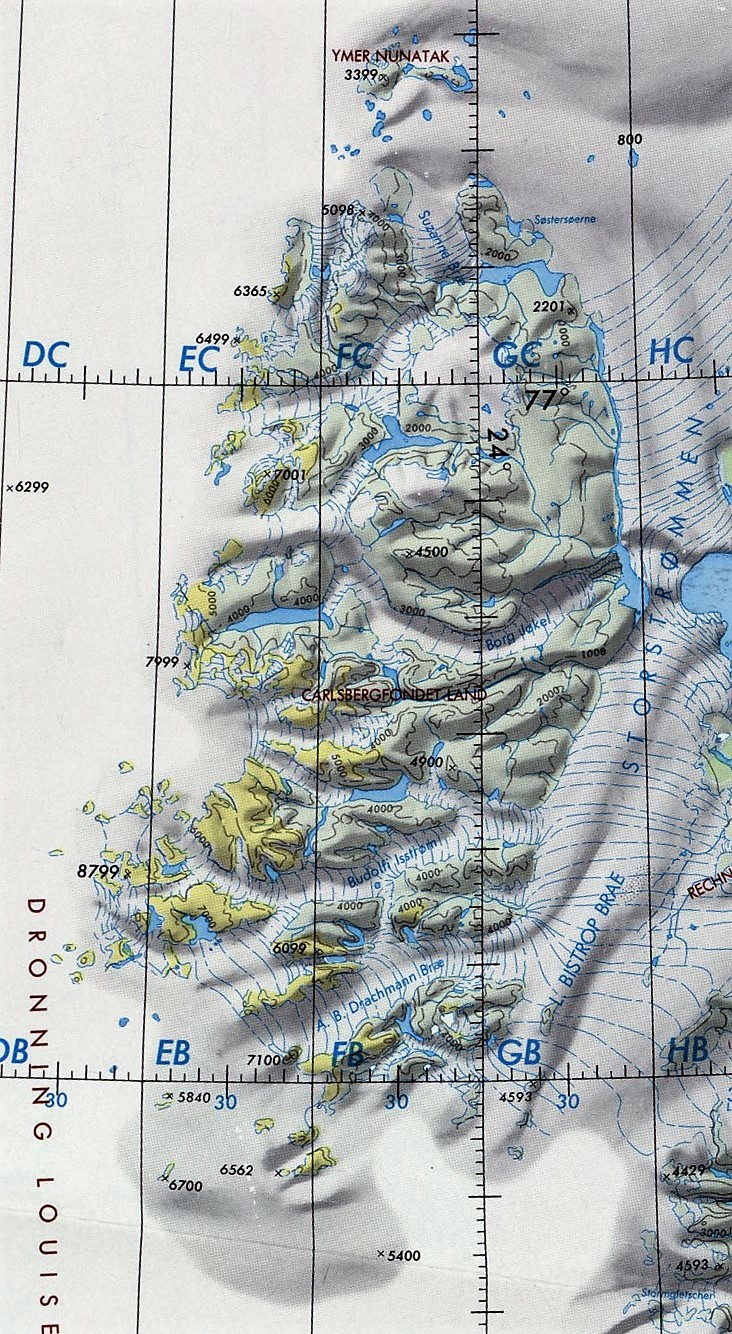
- Queen Louise Land ONC map section with the Storstrømmen in the upper right

- Location within Greenland
- Type: Piedmont glacier
- Location: Greenland
- Coordinates: 77°0′N 22°40′W
- Area: 32,100 km^{2} (12,400 sq mi)
- Length: 125 km (78 mi)
- Width: 26 km (16 mi)
- Terminus: Borg Fjord through Bredebrae; North Atlantic Ocean

Storstrømmen (meaning "Large Stream" in Danish), is one of the major glaciers in northeastern Greenland. The North-East Greenland Ice Stream (NEGIS) discharges into 3 main marine-terminating outlets: 79N Glacier, Zachariae Isstrøm and Storstrømmen – as arranged North to South.

Storstrømmen's ice flows at an average of 185m/yr, an order of magnitude slower than its Northern cousins. This is suggested as this outlet sits on higher elevations, where the subglacial topography and hydro-dynamics pin and slow glacier flow, relative to predominantly marine-based 79N and Zachariae Isstrøm. All 3 outlets see an increased ice velocity in the summer months, as surface meltwater is fed into the subglacial environment, saturating highly-malleable tills and lubricating the over-riding glacier's movement.

Storstrømmen was named because of its size. It was given this name by the ill-fated 1906–08 Denmark Expedition (Danmark-Ekspeditionen) led by Ludvig Mylius-Erichsen.

== Surge-type characteristics ==
Storstrømmen is widely recorded to be a surge-type glacier, which has recently experienced a form of "Quiescence" and slower movement. The last "surge" was recorded by Mouginot and others in 2018 to have ended in 1990. The glacier has been in a quiescent state since, although there are suggestions it will reach the required pre-surge conditions by 2027–2030. Grounding-line retreat is noted by the same article to be approximately 400m/yr, and the "dynamic cycling" of temperature and precipitation (which alters glacier mass-balance) is thought to be causing this.

Storstrømmen's companion glacier "Bistrup Brae" last surged between 1988 and 1996.

== Geographical Context ==
The mighty Storstrømmen is roughly north–south oriented and has a width of over 20 km. Queen Louise Land (Dronning Louise Land) lies to the west and Daniel Bruun Land to the east. Both areas see a large number of nunataks extending above the ice surface. The nunataks present a viable albedo-feedback mechanism, which preferentially forms supraglacial lakes at the margins of many of the outlets in the area.

Flowing southwards for over 125 km from the area of the Alabama Nunatak, its front is in the Bredebrae, the confluence of two very large glaciers, the Storstrømmen flowing from the north and the almost equally large L. Bistrup Brae from the south.

The Storstrømmen is part of an extensive glacier system that includes as well the Kofoed-Hansen Glacier (Kofoed-Hansen Bræ) to the NE and the Borgjokel to the SW.

Map of Northeastern Greenland

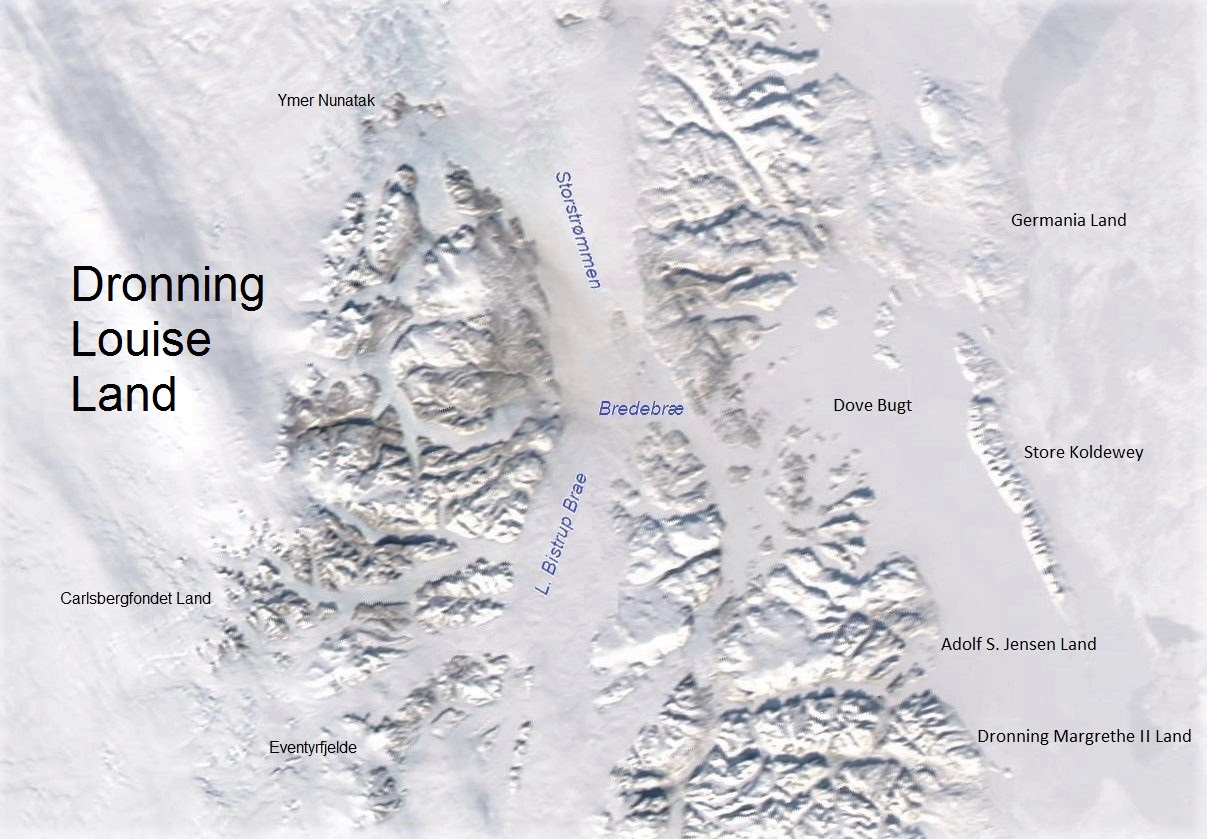
Storstrømmen east of Queen Louise Land

== See also ==
- List of glaciers in Greenland
- 1912-1913 Danish Expedition to Queen Louise Land
