= Queen Louise Land =

Mountainous region in northeastern Greenland

- Nuna Dronning Louise; Dronning Louise Land
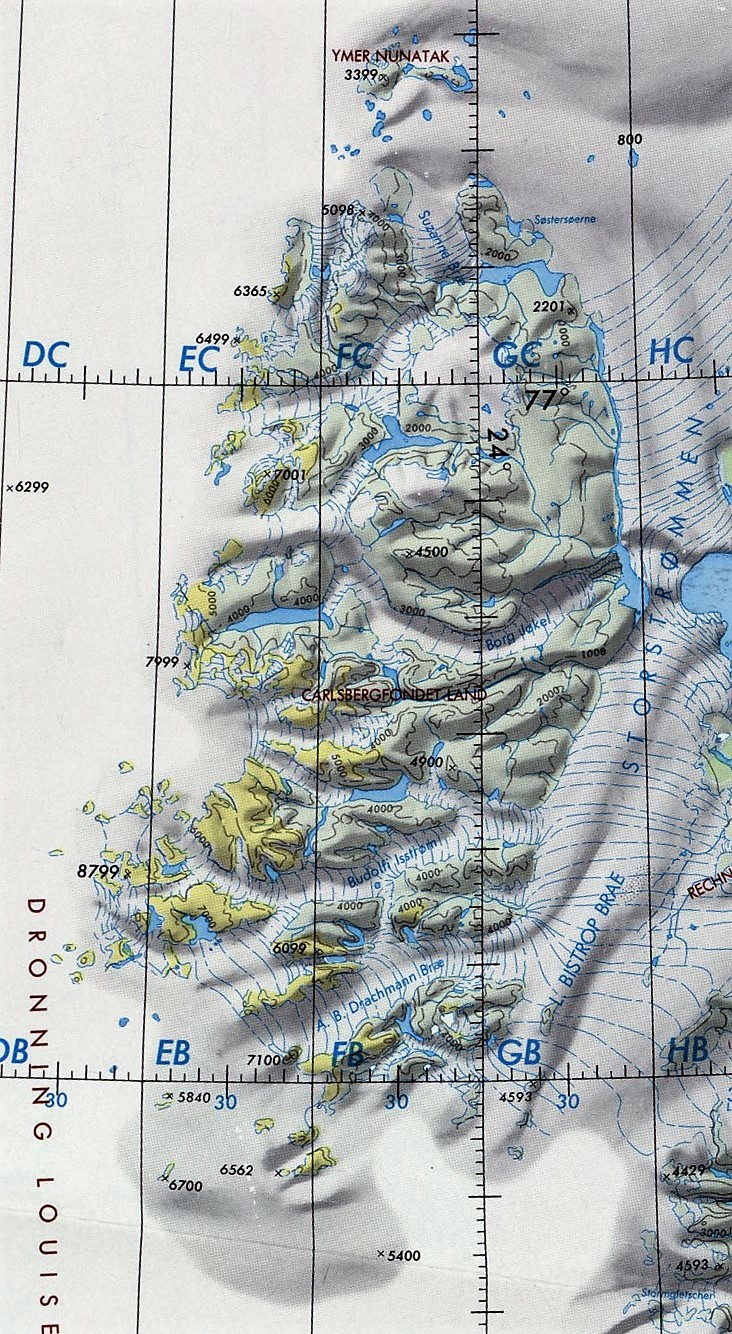
- Queen Louise Land ONC map section.

Highest point
- Peak: Gefiontinde
- Elevation: 2,364 m (7,756 ft)

Dimensions
- Length: 185 km (115 mi) N/S
- Width: 73 km (45 mi) E/W
- Area: 12,000 km^{2} (4,600 mi^{2})

Geography
- Location within Greenland
- Country: Greenland
- Range coordinates: 76°40′N 24°30′W

Geology
- Orogeny: Caledonian orogeny

Queen Louise Land (Danish: Dronning Louise Land; Greenlandic: Nuna Dronning Louise) is a vast mountainous region located west of Dove Bay, King Frederik VIII Land, northeastern Greenland. Administratively it is part of the Northeast Greenland National Park zone.

The highest point of Queen Louise Land is Gefiontinde, with a height of 2,364.3 m (7,757 ft), the highest of the Gefiontinder group of peaks located at 76°28′8″N 25°38′31″W.

Geologically Queen Louise Land is made up of orthogneiss overlain by sedimentary rocks.

== History ==
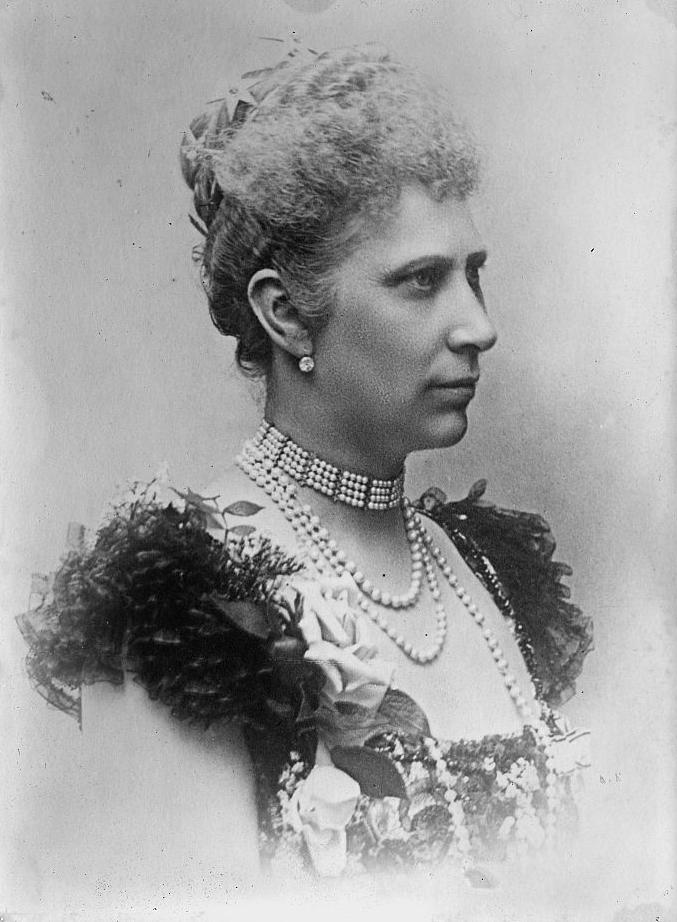
Queen Louise (r. 1906–1912) who the region is named after

This remote area was named Dronning Louises Land after Queen Louise of Denmark (1851–1926), wife of King Frederik VIII of Denmark, by the ill-fated 1906–08 Denmark Expedition —the expedition that aimed to map one of the last unknown parts of Greenland. Danish Arctic explorer Alf Trolle claimed that this area had been originally named as Den Store Nanuták —The Big Nunatak.

Queen Louise Land was subsequently visited by the 1912–13 Danish Expedition to Queen Louise Land led by J.P. Koch, as well as the 1952–54 British North Greenland Expedition led by Commander James Simpson.

== Geography ==
Surrounded by ice masses, Queen Louise Land is clearly delimited. It is an extensive area made up of several very large and numerous small nunataks (summits or ridges of mountains that protrude from the ice). Its western boundary is the Greenland ice sheet and its eastern limits are the massive Storstrommen and L. Bistrup Brae glaciers. Kap Aage Bertelsen is a small headland at the confluence of the large Storstrømmen and L. Bistrup Bræ glaciers in the east. Dryasdal is a valley seasonally covered with Dryas octopetala flowers. The area of Queen Louise Land is uninhabited.

The main geographic divisions or parts of Queen Louise Land from north to south are:

- Ymer Nunatak, a large nunatak located at the northern end of Queen Louise Land, south of the Alabama Nunatak. The Suzanne Glacier flows to the south and from it flows the Britannia Glacier southwards into main Queen Louise Land.
- Central Queen Louise Land, the main part or Queen Louise Land proper.
- Carlsbergfondet Land, the southwestern part of Queen Louise Land, between Budolfi Isstrom and A.B. Drachmann Glacier.
- Eventyrfjelde, the southernmost part of Queen Louise Land, south of A.B. Drachmann Glacier.

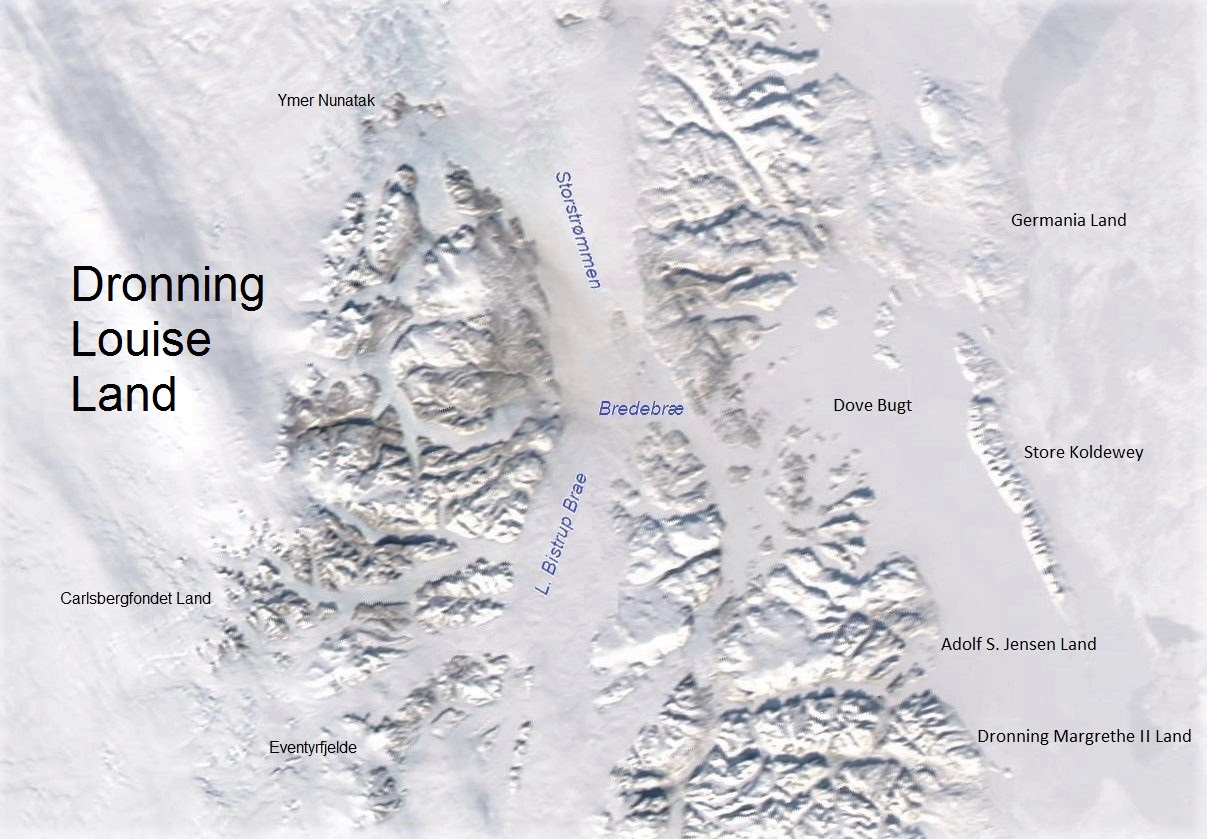
Queen Louise Land and neighbouring areas NASA picture.

=== Glaciers, ice caps, lakes and rivers ===
- A.B. Drachmann Glacier, located in the southern part.
- Ad Astra Ice Cap (Ad Astra Iskappe), large ice cap in the northern central area.
- Admiralty Glacier, in the north of the central part.
- Army ice cap, in the central part.
- Borgjøkel, a glacier in the central part.
- Britannia Glacier, in the north.
- Britannia Sø, a lake.
- Budolfi Isstrøm, a glacier in the southern part.
- Ebbe Gletscher, a glacier in the southern part.
- Eigil Sø, a lake.
- Ejnar Gletscher, a glacier in the southern part.
- Farimagsø, a lake.
- Gultop Glacier, in the north.
- Hastings Glacier, in the NW.
- Kursbræ, a glacier in the southern part.
- Metafor Glacier
- Pony Glacier
- Shell ice cap, small ice cap in the central area.
- Søstersøer, twin lakes.
- Strandelv, a river.
- Sunderland Gletscher, in the NW.
- Suzanne Brae, a branch of Britannia Glacier.
- Trefork Glacier, in the central part.
- Trefork Sø, a large lake.
- Vedel Sø, a lake.

=== Mountains, nunataks and cliffs ===
Many of the mountains and massifs are little glaciated. Mountains are generally rounded and rarely craggy, but there are numerous cliffs. The average elevation is around 1,500 m.

- Barrieren (2,200 m)
- Bohr Bjerg
- Cloos Klippe, a cliff
- Curie Klippe, a cliff
- Dickens Bjerg
- Dannebrogsfjeldene, range east of Revaltoppe
- Dronningestolen
- Durham Klippe, a cliff
- Falkonerklippe, a nunatak
- Farvel Nunatak, nunatak group
- Fermi Klippe, cliff
- Gefiontinder (2,364 m), peak group
- Glückstadt Nunatak
- Grimm Fjelde, hilly area
- Gultop
- Gundahl Knold
- H.A. Jensen Bjerg
- H.C. Andersen Fjelde, hilly area
- Helgoland
- Henius Nunatak
- Hertugen, a dark peak
- Hjelmen
- Hvalryggen
- Juel-Brockdorff Nunatak
- Himmerland Hede, a plateau
- Kaldbakur, a nunatak
- Kap Bellevue
- Kap Weinschenck
- Kamæleon, a nunatak
- Kelvin Klippe, a cliff
- Krebs Bjerg
- Laub Nunataks, nunatak group
- Lembcke Bjerg, a nunatak
- Lodlineklippe, a cliff
- Monumentet, prominent rocky ridge by Pony Glacier
- Morænevolden, moraine ridge
- Newton Klippe, a cliff
- Olsen Nunataks, nunatak group
- Paletten, nunatak group
- Poulsen Nunataks, nunatak group
- Prins Axel Nunatak
- Prinsessen (1,907 m), spectacular ice-covered peak
- Prøvestenen, a nunatak
- Punktum (2,175 m), a nunatak
- Regnbueklippe, a cliff
- Revaltoppe (2,317 m), a nunatak
- Rutherford Bjerg
- Sankt Vitus Bjerg
- Savryggen, a nunatak
- Splinten, rocky ridge
- St. Andrews Klippe, a cliff
- Suzanne Nunatak
- Syvstjernen, nunatak group
- Thomson Klippe, a cliff
- Timeglasset, peak with two summits
- Trekanten, a nunatak
- Vinkelklippe, a cliff
- Winston Bjerg
- Zebra Klippe, the northern cliff of Juel-Brockdorff Nunatak

== See also ==
- List of mountain ranges of Greenland
- List of Nunataks#Greenland
