= Danish Expedition to Queen Louise Land =

Danish expedition to North Greenland

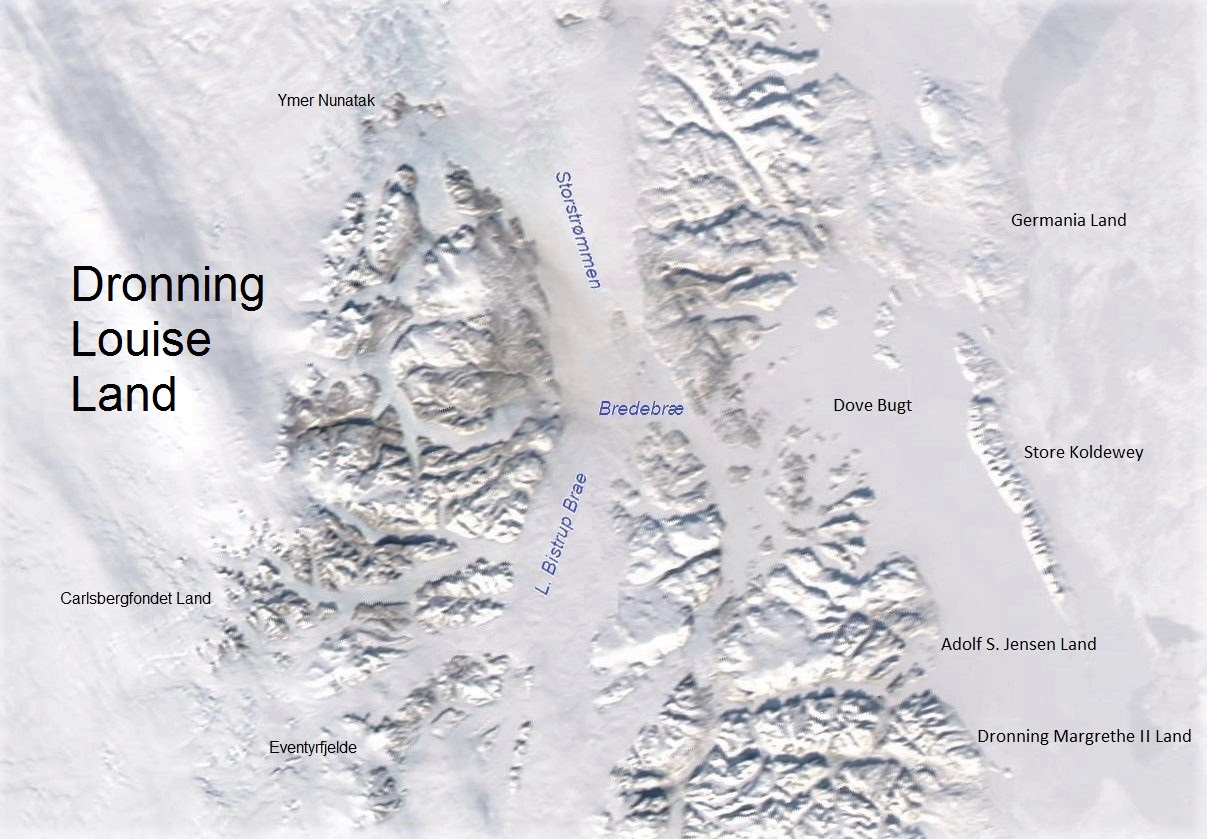
Queen Louise Land and neighbouring areas NASA picture.

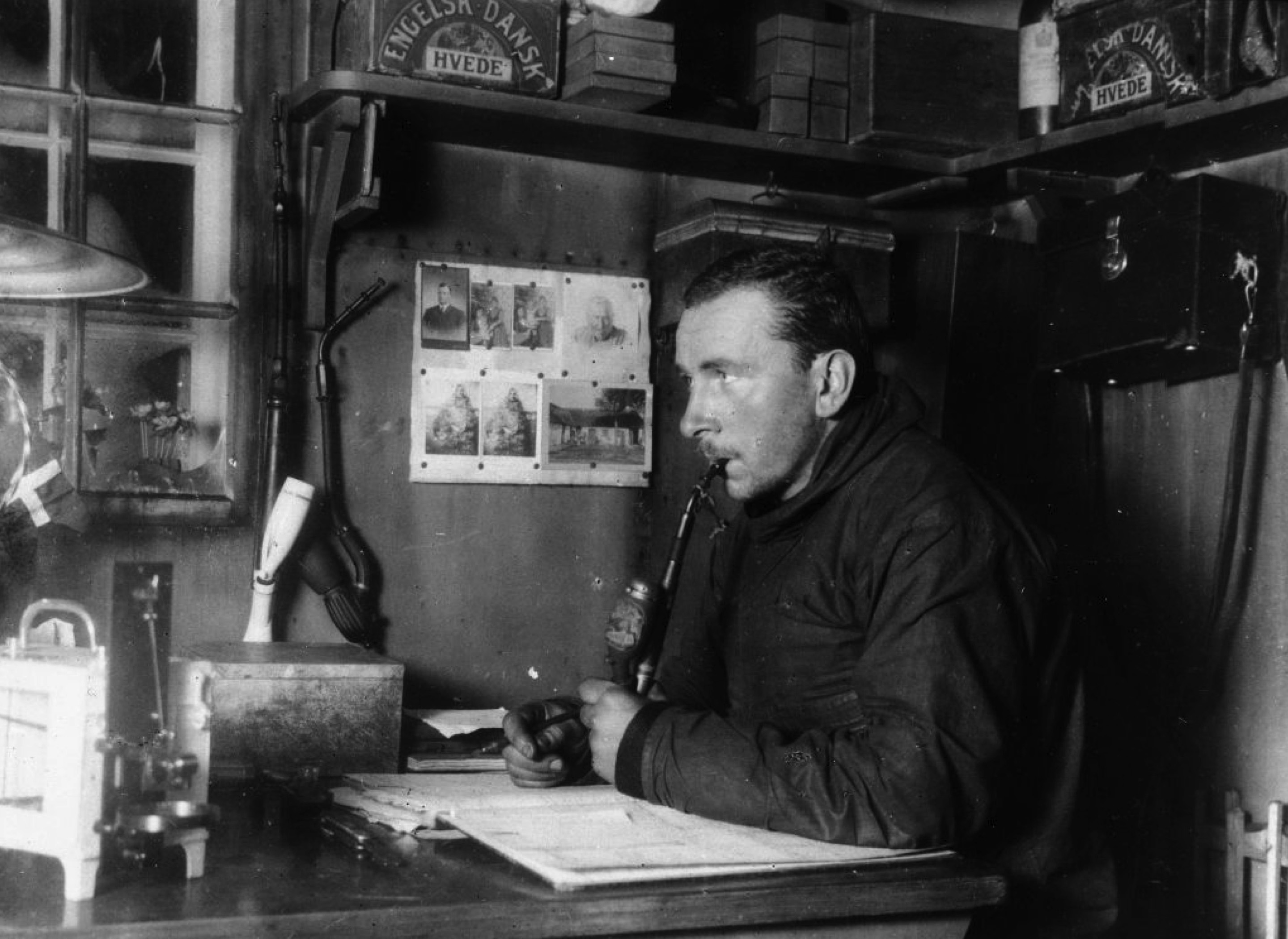
Alfred Wegener in the Borg station during the 1912-1913 winter.

The Danish Expedition to Queen Louise Land, also known as the Danish expedition to Queen Louise Land and straight through Greenland’s ice sheet (Danish: Danske ekspedition til Dronning Louises Land og tværs over Nordgrønlands indlandsis), as well as Danish North Greenland Expedition, was an expedition to northeastern Greenland and across the Greenland ice sheet in 1912–1913. It was the first such venture that went across the broad central part of Greenland. The expedition was led by Johan Peter Koch (1870–1928). Its purpose was to study the vast ice sheet, making glaciological and meteorological observations. Instead of sled dogs, sixteen Icelandic ponies were chosen for transporting 20 tons of materials, including 6 t (5.9 long tons; 6.6 short tons) of compressed hay to feed the ponies.

The first phase of the expedition was reaching Queen Louise Land, a nunatak region located on the edge of the Greenland Ice Sheet, and the building of a wintering station there. In the spring of 1913 the members of the expedition left their base and headed westwards on an approximately 1,200 km (750 mi) long journey, crossing the Greenland Ice Sheet and reaching the western shore near Kangersuatsiaq, former Prøven.

== History ==
=== Preparation and arrival ===
Ship Godthaab unloading materiel near Danmarkshavn in July 1912.

J.P. Koch was helped by Alfred Wegener (1880–1930) in the planning and carrying out of the project. Both had previously taken part in the 1906–1908 Danmark Expedition, Koch as a surveyor and Wegener as a meteorologist. Their project was to research the snow and ice conditions of the mostly unexplored ice sheet, beginning with the large glaciers of Queen Louise Land. Only four men took part, the other two being Vigfus Sigurdsson (1875–1950), an Icelander who was in charge of the ponies, and Danish sailor Lars Larsen (1886–1978). The fourth member should have been botanist Andreas Lundager (1869–1940), who had already been in Greenland in an earlier expedition. However, during the preparation phase, he realized that he wouldn't have the physical strength required for such a venture, and was replaced by Lars Larsen. An Icelandic Sheepdog named Gloë was also brought along. The members and the animals went through a one-month long preparation and training period in Iceland before they sailed to Greenland.

The expedition arrived at Storm Kap near Danmarkshavn on ship Godthaab in July 1912. Soon after disembarking most of the ponies ran away, but the men were lucky enough to capture ten of the thirteen that had escaped. The expedition split then in two, with Koch and Larsen transporting the materials with a motorboat towards the land. Meanwhile Wegener and Sigurðsson brought the ponies overland westwards. From the onset their project of bringing all the materials up to the ice sheet level would be fraught with difficulties. By 1 September they were finally able to bring all the baggage to Kap Stop, 6 km (3.7 mi) to the northeast of Lindhard Island. The motorboat was beyond repair, the engine having broken and the keel and rudder being damaged. Meanwhile the surface of the Borg Fjord began to freeze, but the expedition had to wait until the ice was strong enough for the weight of the ponies and the sledges, which took a further three weeks. Before them rose the 40 m (130 ft) high ice cliff of the Bredebrae glacier, which they had to climb to reach Queen Louise Land.

=== Establishment of the wintering station ===
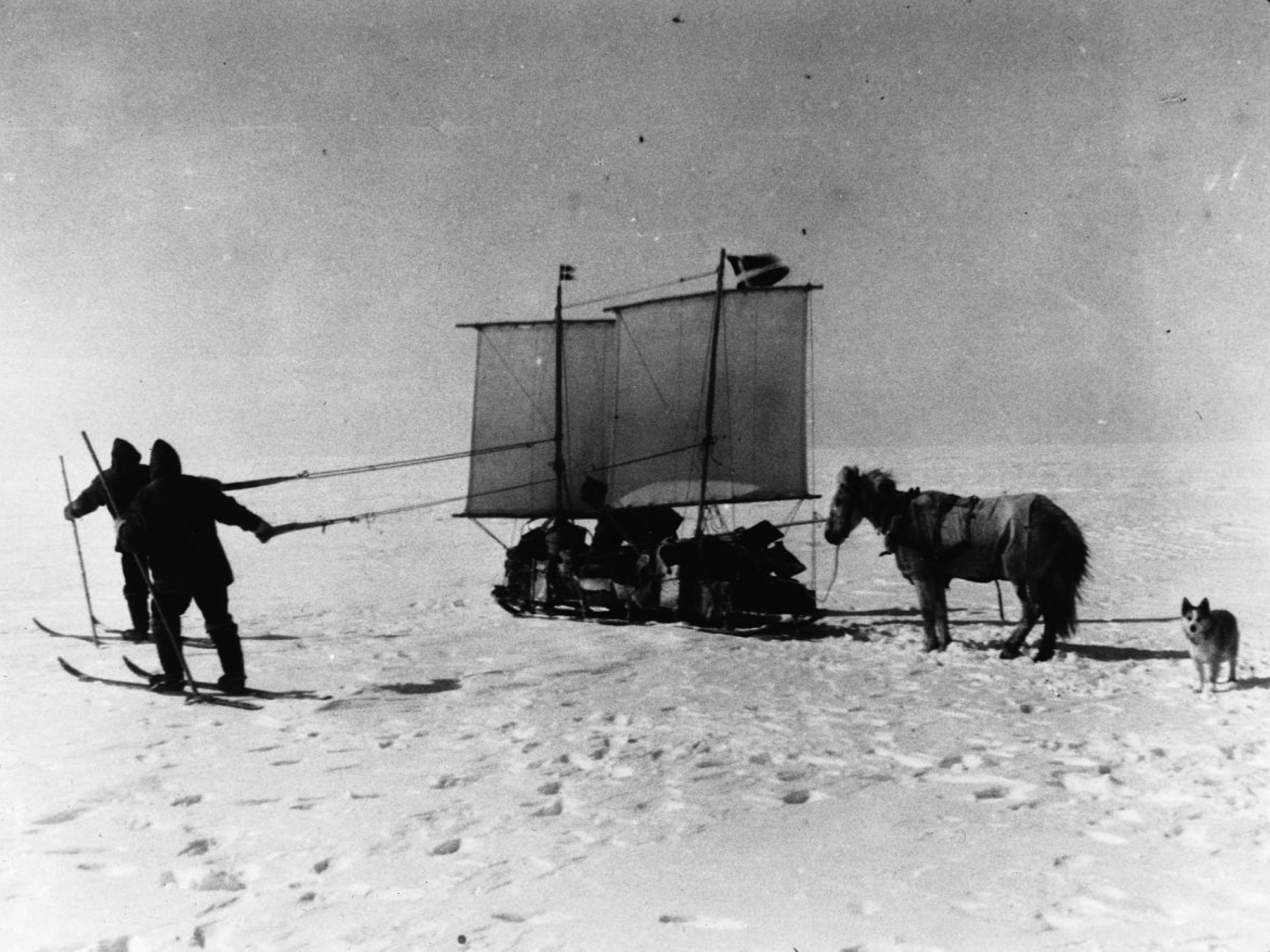
One of the sledges of the expedition with one of the ponies and the dog.

The men had to build a bridge crossing five crevasses and to cut a passage on the ice wall. While exploring the glacier Wegener fell down and broke a rib, but he recovered enough to help in the work of hauling the material. On the 30 September the glacier calved and a 0.5 km (0.31 mi) long section tumbled into the fjord's waters. As a result some of the supplies were lost, the bridges were damaged and the passage was obstructed. The repair work took days and precious time was lost, as the days were getting darker. Once on top of the glacier, the expedition headed towards inner Queen Louise Land, where Koch had planned to establish the wintering station. However, the ice surface was so harsh that four of the seven sledges were damaged during the attempt to cross the broad glacier westwards with all their heavy material. After deliberations with Wegener, Koch gave up his goal of building the base where he had originally intended and searched for a place on the glacier as far from the shore as possible. Thus, on 12 October the house was built on the last stretch of Storstrommen, off the Borgjokel terminus at 76°42′N 22°24′W, 14 km (8.7 mi) west of the eastern edge of Queen Louise Land.

The wintering station was named "Borg", a name that had been suggested by Koch's wife after the farm of Egill Skallagrimsson in Iceland. The meteorological and glaciological observations began almost immediately, the latter using ice-drilling equipment. Five of the ten ponies were slaughtered in order to preserve their meat for the winter. After settling down in their base the members of the expedition kept exploring a practicable way westwards across the ice. During such an exploration in early November Koch fell into a crevasse and broke his leg, which would take months of rest to heal. Fortunately the remaining part of the winter was quite uneventful and by early March Koch was able to take part in the surveys of Queen Louise Land that the expedition members carried out from their base until mid April.

=== The crossing of Central Greenland ===
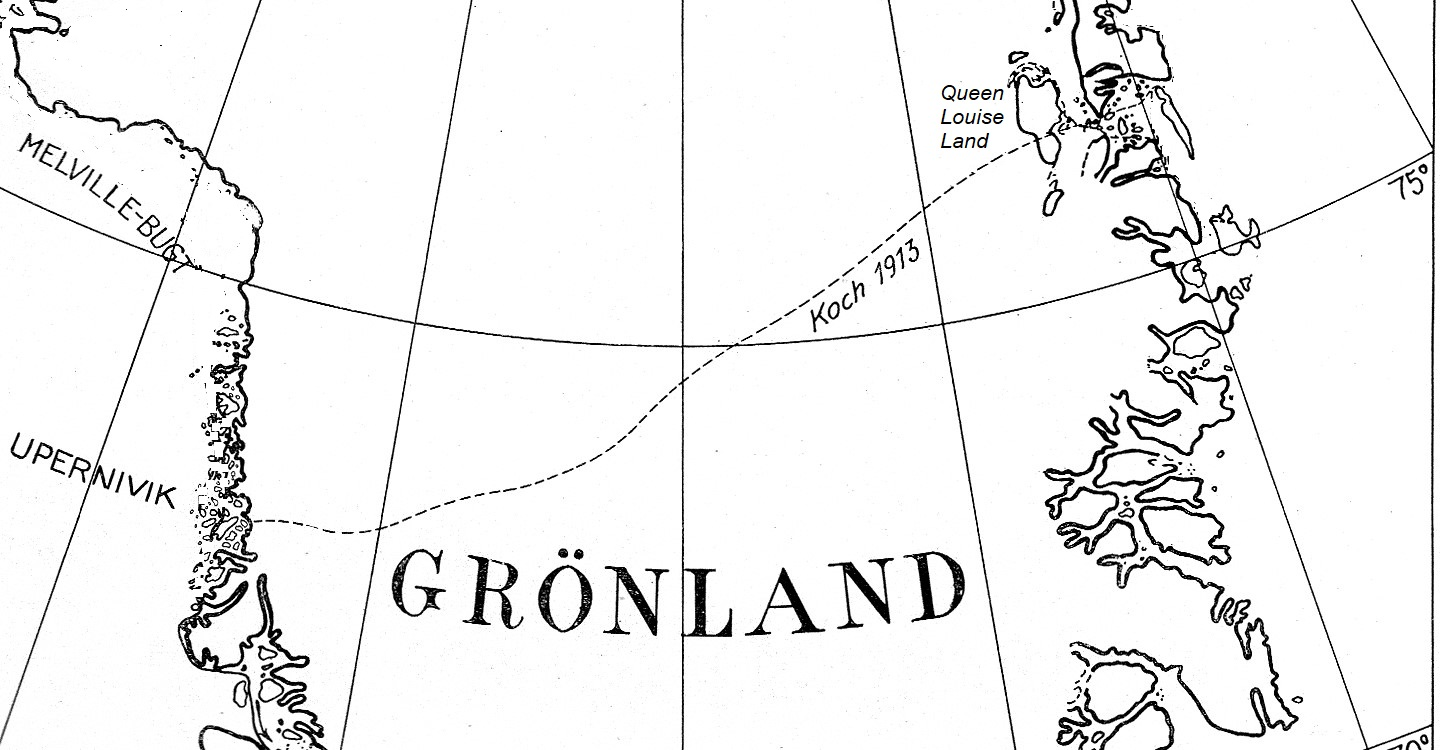
Route of the Danish Expedition to Queen Louise Land 1912–1913

On the 21 April in the evening the expedition members left their base and began their great journey westwards on the five ponies and five sledges that remained. They crossed Queen Louise Land through the Borgjokel, then south through the Farimag Valley (Farimags Dal), and west through the Kursbrae glacier that was so named by Koch. As they went westwards the mountains gave way to isolated nunataks rising a little above the ice sheet. After they passed the last one, the westernmost point of Queen Louise Land, Koch named it Punktum, for it was the last piece of land they would see for many hundreds of miles ahead.

In the third week of May they were trudging forward in the middle of the white desert. The sky was blue, but frequent ground blizzards made their advance difficult. The constant sharp wind in their faces caused frostbite and exhausted the ponies that had to pull the sleds, so the men had to help with the pulling. Temperatures reached −26 °C (−15 °F) at midday with a recorded low of −32.3 °C (−26.1 °F). The ice sheet was sloping upwards and by early June the caravan reached a height of 2,739 m (8,986 ft). The high altitude also contributed to the exhaustion of men and animals. Two of the ponies had to be shot because they refused to go forward and Wegener seriously wondered in his diary whether any of the expedition members would reach the west coast of Greenland alive. All along the trip temperature records of the snow were taken. Shafts were dug to make measurements in deeper layers of the ice sheet.

By mid June they had reached a height of 2,937 m (9,636 ft) and were past the middle point of the journey. The average daily distance covered was around 20 km (12 mi) in optimal conditions, However on the third week of June they had to interrupt the progress of the caravan owing to a violent storm and had to wait for days until it abated. The ponies suffered from snow blindness. By early July the last pony was dying and with the proximity of the west coast the summer weather set in. Holes of melted snow and surface streams hindered their advance towards the western end of the ice sheet. The expedition members finally hit land at 72°36′N 53°47′W by the head of the Lakse Elv. They were weakened and starving, but the nature of the fringe area was inhospitable. In mid July the men reached the shore of the Lakse Fjord (Eqalugaarsuit Sulluat) where they sighted a ship and made signals with one of the sails of the sleds. It was the ship of the Upernavik pastor who brought the four exhausted men to Prøven, now Kangersuatsiaq.

=== Aftermath ===
In 1913 itself, just months after the end of the venture, J.P. Koch published the expedition's travel journal Gennem den hvide ørken (Through the White Desert), which became a popular book. Shortly after the First World War Wegener published a German edition of the same book under the title Durch die weiße Wüste, meaning "Across the White Desert" as well.

The expedition provided new insights into hitherto unexplored areas of the interior of Greenland, including the topography, vegetation and wildlife of the main parts of Queen Louise Land, of which only the southern end was left unexplored. Groundbreaking temperature recordings were taken and first-hand observations of the movements and internal structure of glaciers were made on the vast Ice Sheet, as well as on the large glaciers to the east of Queen Louise Land. A large number of meteorological observations were also carried out, which were used as a basis for further studies. Innovative photography techniques were used and the polar region Fata Morgana phenomenon was photographed for the first time with the help of a special telescope camera. Also the earliest pictures of the aurora borealis were taken using newly developed cameras.

J.P. Koch had designed the Borg wintering station as a well-built solid house, with an attached stable for the ponies, that could withstand the violent storms of the area. His wish had been to build it over firm terrain in middle Queen Louise Land, so that future expeditions could use it. Unfortunately in the end it had to be built over the glacier ground to the east because of the harsh ice conditions that made the transport of the heavy building materials further to the west impossible and winter was fast approaching. The abandoned station was thus subject to the roughly southeastward movement of the glacier and eventually fell into the waters of the Borg Fjord during a calving event.

One year after J.P. Koch's death Wegener would return to Greenland for the German Greenland Expedition 1930–1931 led by himself. His goal was to establish three Arctic stations in the same parallel. The main one was built at 71°11′N 39°56′W in the center of the ice sheet and was named Eismitte. Glaciological, seismological and meteorological observations were carried out there. Owing to numerous difficulties this venture would claim Wegener's life during a return trip from the station together with expedition member Rasmus Villumsen.

== Literature ==
- Gudmundur Freyr Ulfarsson & Vigfús Sigurðsson, Crossing Greenland: Survival and Exploration with J.P. Koch & Alfred Wegener, 2023
- Spencer Apollonio, Lands That Hold One Spellbound: A Story of East Greenland, 2008

== See also ==
- Cartographic expeditions to Greenland
- List of research stations in the Arctic
