= Jim Simpson (explorer) =

Commander Jim Simpson CBE DSC
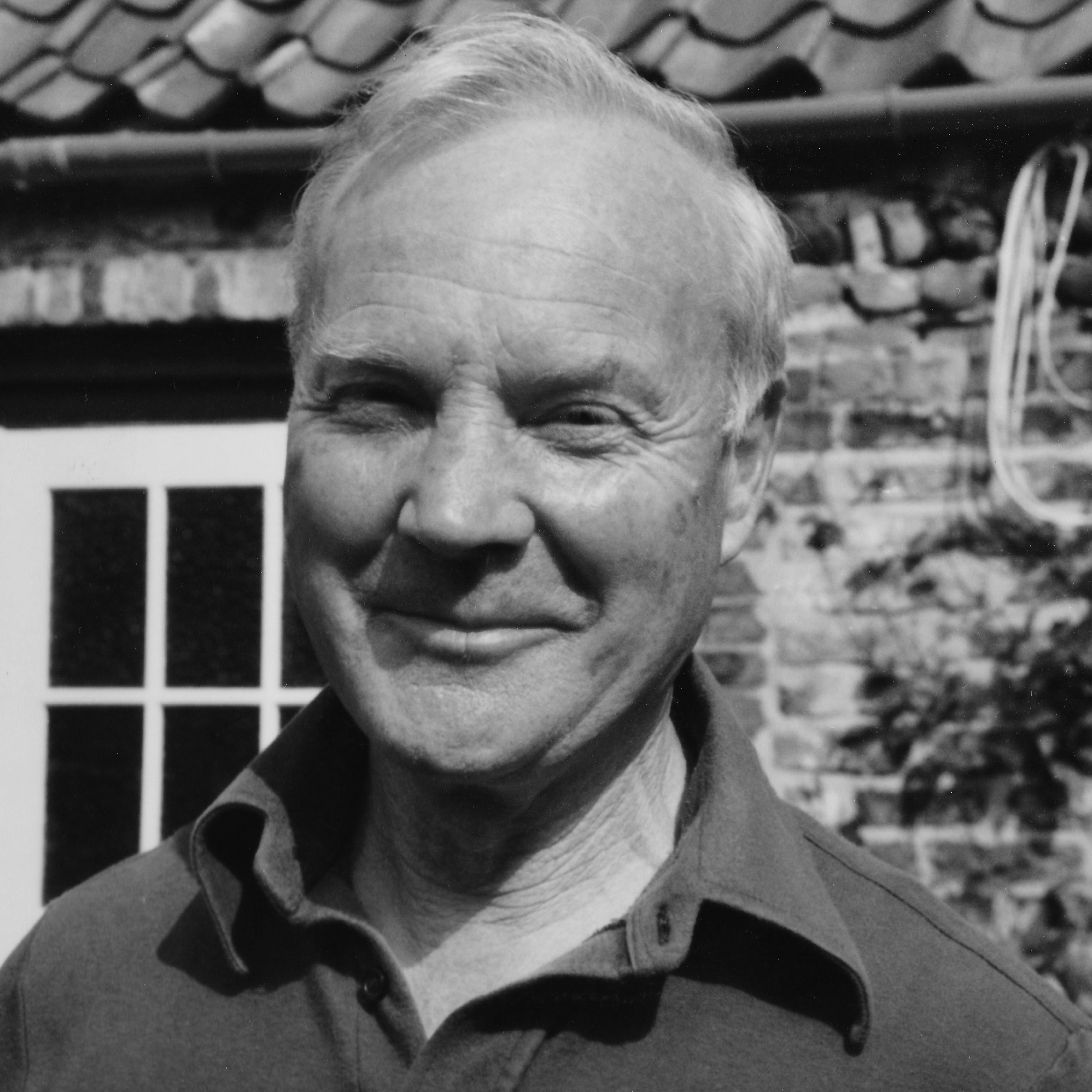

Personal details
- Born: Cortlandt James Woore Simpson; 2 September 1911 Westbourne, Sussex, England
- Died: 9 May 2002 (aged 90) South Hams, Devon, England

Cortlandt James Woore Simpson (2 September 1911, Westbourne, Sussex – 9 May 2002, South Hams, Devon) was an English polar explorer and naval officer.

== Personal life ==
Jim Simpson was born into a naval family His grandfather, Vice-Admiral Cortlandt Herbert Simpson, was the commander of HMS Mullett and other vessels, and his father, Rear Admiral Cortlandt Herbert Simpson, also had a distinguished naval career. His family home for three generations was in Stoke-by-Nayland in Suffolk. Simpson sold it in 1969, building a smaller house for himself in the grounds, before eventually moving to Somerset and then to Devon in later life.

Simpson was married four times and had one daughter. His last wife Ann, was the ex-wife of Keith Stainton, the Conservative M.P.

His great-grandfather was John Busby, who along with his great-uncle James Busby were the fathers of the Australian wine industry.

== Naval career ==
He was commissioned into the Royal Navy following graduation from the Royal Naval College, Dartmouth. After service on several vessels, he resigned his commission in 1936 in order to study electrical engineering at the University of London.

He returned to the Royal Navy in 1939 as an electrical officer, serving as an anti-submarine specialist, and in destroyers.

He was awarded the Distinguished Service Cross in the 1945 King's Birthday Honours.

He retired from the Royal Navy in 1961.

== British North Greenland expedition ==
North Ice was the name of the Greenland ice sheet research station of the British North Greenland expedition (1952 to 1954). Led by Simpson, the expedition had its main base camp in Britannia Lake, Queen Louise Land. Following the expedition Simpson was awarded the Polar Medal in 1954, and the Royal Geographical Society's Patron's Medal in 1955.
