= Surge (glacier) =

Event where a glacier can advance substantially

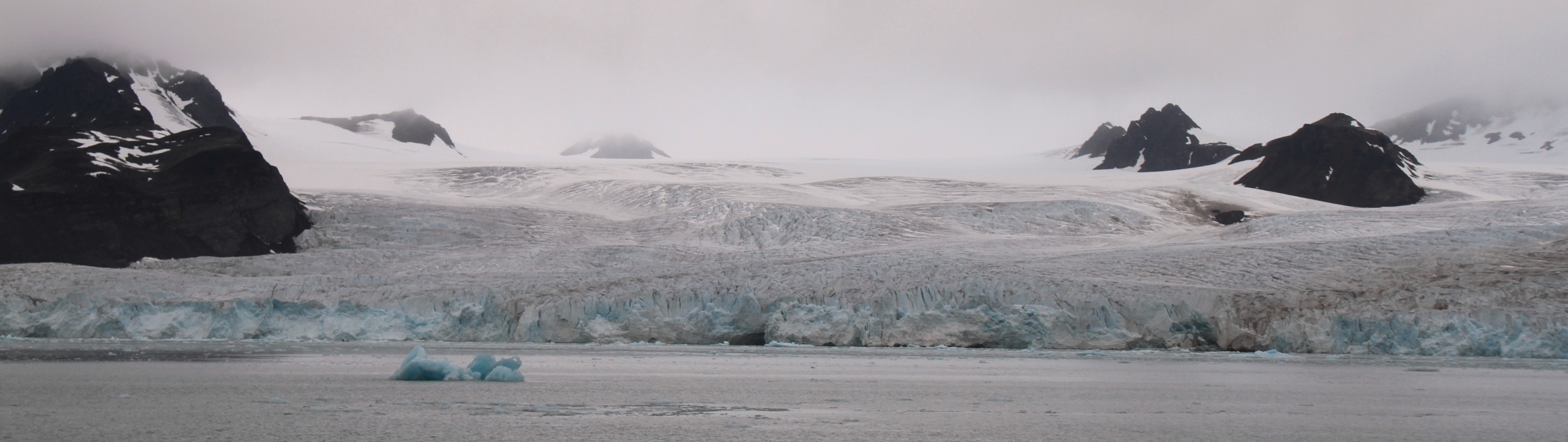
Glacier and mountains at northwestern coast of Lilliehöök Fjord, parts of the Lilliehöökbreen glacier - western Spitsbergen

Glacial surges are short-lived events where the flow velocity on a portion of a glacier can increase to up to 100 times faster than normal during a few months or years. It is associated with an important transportation of ice mass down-glacier, often but not always causing the advance of the glacier front. Surge events are likely an extreme case of the continuous spectra of glacier instabilities. Surging glaciers cluster around a few areas. High concentrations of surging glaciers occur in the Karakoram, Pamir Mountains, Svalbard, the Canadian Arctic islands, Alaska and Iceland, although overall it is estimated that only one percent of all the world's glaciers ever surge. In some glaciers, surges can occur in fairly regular cycles, with cycle periods commonly ranging from 15 to 100 years or more. In other glaciers, surging remains unpredictable. The period of stagnation and build-up between two surges typically lasts 10 to 200 years and is called the quiescent phase. During this period the velocities of the glacier are significantly lower, and the glaciers can retreat substantially.

== Types ==
Glacier surges have been historically divided into two categories depending on the character of the surge event. Glaciers in Alaska exhibit surges with a sudden onset, an extremely high maximum flow rate (tens of meters/day) and a sudden termination, often with a discharge of stored water. These are called Alaskan-type surges and it is suspected that these surges are hydrologically controlled.

Surges in Svalbard typically exhibit different behavior. Svalbard surges are typically associated with slower onset with an acceleration phase, rising to a maximum velocity which is typically slower (up to four or five meters per day) than Alaskan surges, and a return to quiescence often taking years. Features observed during the active or surge phase include potholes, known as lacunas and medial moraines.

== Examples of events ==
In the Norwegian Arctic, Svalbard is an archipelago containing hundreds of glaciers. Svalbard is more than 60% covered by glaciers and of these glaciers, hundreds have been observed to surge.

Glacial surges in the Karakoram occur in the presence of "extreme uplift and denudation."

In 1980, there were several mini-surges of Variegated Glacier in Alaska. Mini surges typically show lag times of basal flow of 5–10 hours, which correlates to differences between the surging part of a glacier and the output of water and sediment. When the 1982 surge ended on July 5, there was a large flood event that day, and more flooding in the following days. What Humphrey found in his study is that behind the glacial surge zone, there are predominantly low basal water velocities, and high sliding rates before the rapid release of large quantities of water.

== Causes ==
There have been many theories of why glacial surges occur.

=== Hydrological control ===
Surges may be caused by the supply of meltwater to the base of a glacier. Meltwater is important in reducing frictional forces to glacial ice flow. The distribution and pressure of water at the bed modulates the glacier's velocity and therefore mass balance. Meltwater may come from a number of sources, including supraglacial lakes, geothermal heating of the bed, conduction of heat into the glacier and latent heat transfers. There is a positive feedback between velocity and friction at the bed, high velocities will generate more frictional heat and create more meltwater. Crevassing is also enhanced by greater velocity flow which will provide further rapid transmission paths for meltwater flowing towards the bed. However, Humphrey found no precise correlation between ice-slow down and the release of water inside of a glacier.

The evolution of the drainage system under the glacier plays a key role in surge cycles.

=== Thermal regime ===
Glaciers that exhibit surges like those in Svalbard; with slower onset phase, and a longer termination phase may be thermally controlled rather than hydrologically controlled. These surges tend to last for longer periods of time than hydrologically controlled surges.

=== Deformable bed hypothesis ===
In other cases, the geology of the underlying country rock may dictate surge frequency. For example, poorly consolidated sedimentary rocks are more prone to failure under stress; a sub-glacial "landslip" may permit the glacier to slide. This explains why surging glaciers tend to cluster in certain areas.

=== Critical mass ===
Meier and Post suggest that once mass accumulates to a critical point, basal melting begins to occur. This provides a buoyancy force, "lifting" the glacier from the bed and reducing the friction force.

== Bibliography ==
- [Dowdeswell, J.A., B. Unwin, A. -M. Nuttall and D. J. Wingham. 1999. Velocity structure, flow instability and mass flux on a large Arctic ice cap from satellite radar interferometry. Elsevier Science B.V.]
- [Humphrey, Neil Frank. Basal Hydrology of a Surge-Type Glacier: Observations and Theory Relating to Variegated Glacier. University of Washington, 1987.]
- [Jiskoot H, DT Juhlin. 2009. Surge of a small East Greenland glacier, 2001–2007, suggests Svalbard-type surge mechanism. Journal of Glaciology, Vol. 55, No. 191., pp. 567–570.]
- https://web.archive.org/web/20050323125548/http://users.aber.ac.uk/kak3/glacier_surges.htm
- http://www.bgrg.org/pages/education/alevel/coldenvirons/Lesson%208.htm http://www.bgrg.org/pages/education/alevel/coldenvirons/Lesson%208.htm
- [Murray, T., T. Strozzi, A. Luckman, H. Jiskoot, and P. Christakos (2003), Is there a single surge mechanism? Contrasts in dynamics between glacier surges in Svalbard and other regions, J. Geophys. Res., 108(B5), 2237, ] doi:10.1029/2002JB001906.
- [Fowler, A. C., Murray, T. and Ng, F.S.L. Thermal regulation of glacier surging. Journal of Glaciology, 47(159), 527–538, 2001.]
- Summerfield, Michael A. 1991. Global Geomorphology, an introduction to the study of landforms. Pearson, Prentice Hall. Harlow, England
- [M Sharp. 1988. Surging glaciers: geomorphic effects. Progress in Physical geography. ppg.sagepub.com]
- Stephen G. Evans, Olga V. Tutubalina, Valery N. Drobyshev, Sergey S. Chernomorets, Scott McDougall, Dmitry A. Petrakov, Oldrich Hungr. Catastrophic detachment and high-velocity long-runout flow of Kolka Glacier, Caucasus Mountains, Russia in 2002 // Geomorphology, 2009. - Vol. 105. - P. 314–321.
