= Aars water tower =

Water tower in Aars, Denmark

Coordinates: 56°48′18.3″N 9°31′21.1″E

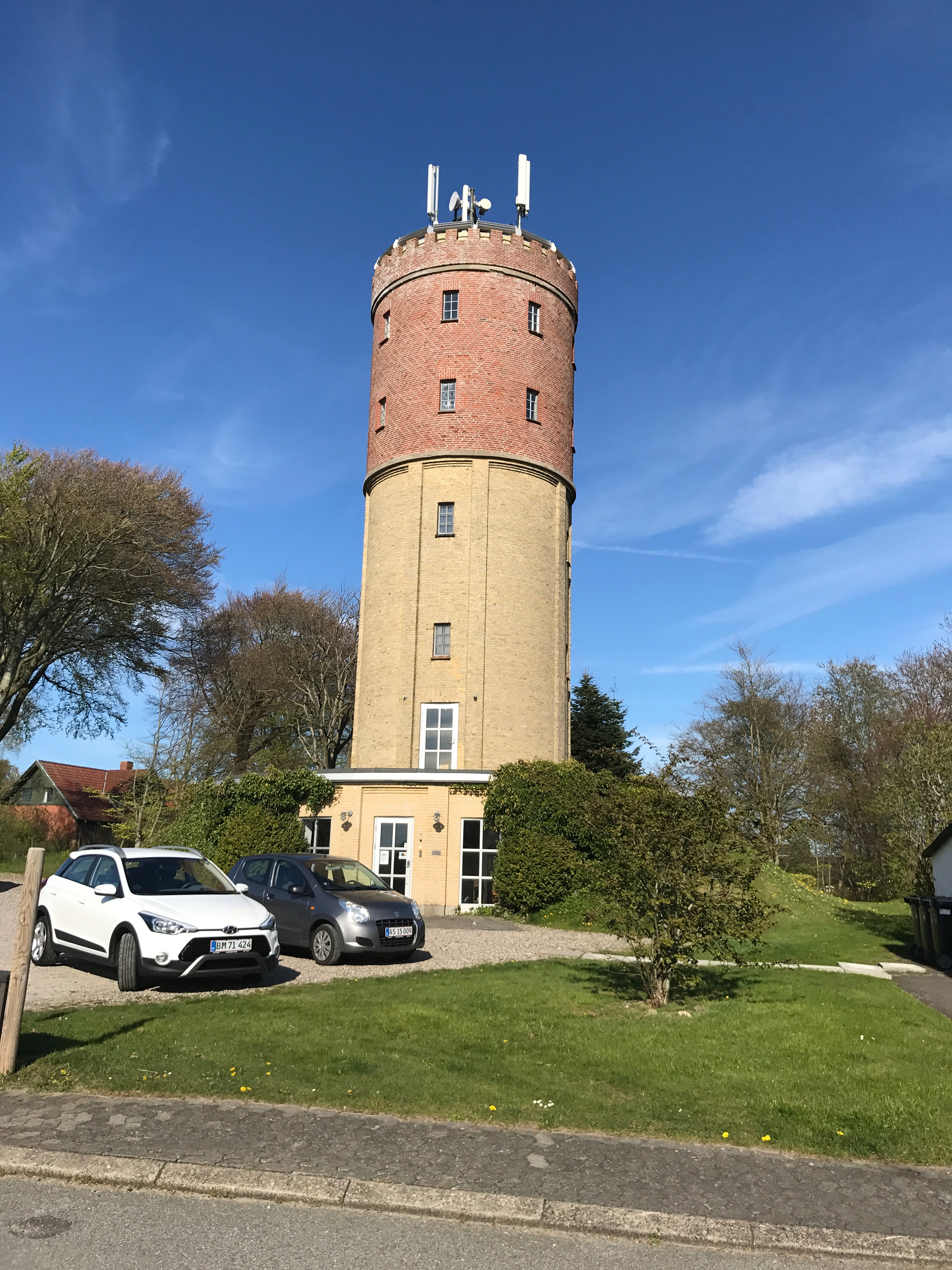
Aars water tower

Aars water tower is a water tower located in Aars in Himmerland, Denmark. The tower was built in 1930 right in the middle of a very old water tank when the city's original water supply went out. The tower used to have a neon logo as well as a Cimbrian bull and the Aars Municipality coat of arms above it, but they were taken down. The tower was also a shop where you could buy yarn and many other things like tea cups. But the shop moved away from the tower.
