= Mother Denmark =

National Personification of Denmark

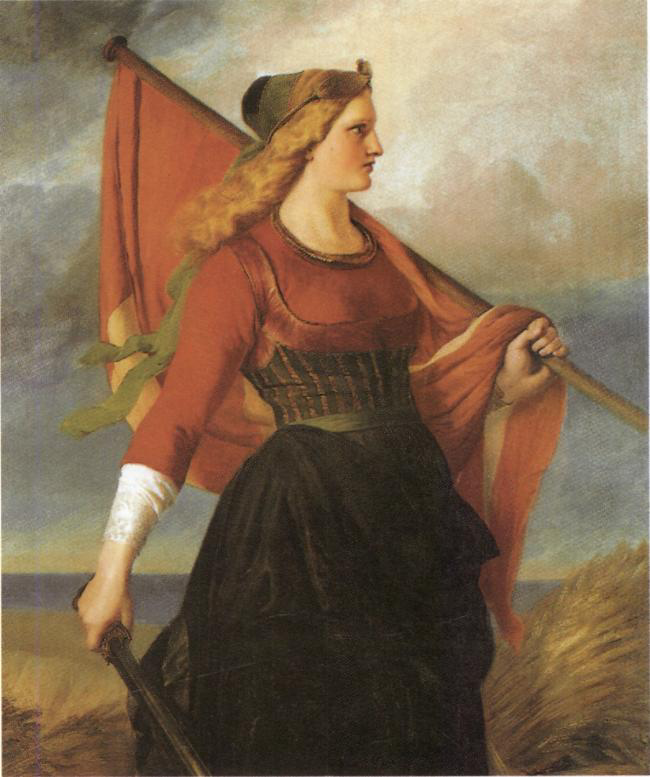
Baumann's Mother Denmark painting from 1851

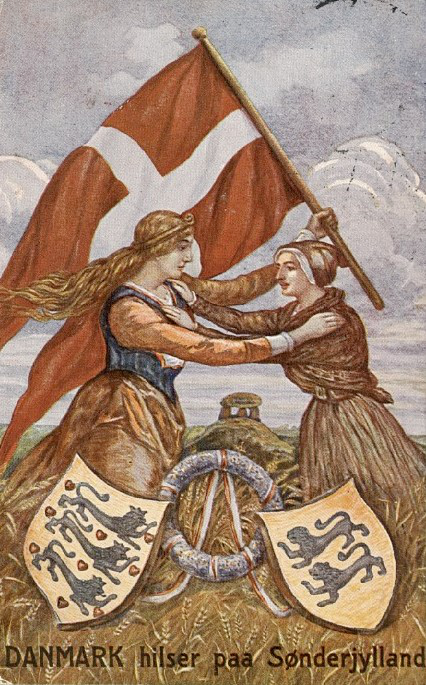
1920 Reunification Referendum poster

Mother Denmark (Danish: Moder Danmark) is the female personification of Denmark and a patriotic emblem of the Danish nation.

== History ==
Allegorial representations of Denmark as a woman with antique garments and a coat of arms are first seen in the 18th century. In the 19th century, with Romantic Nationalism, it became more common. Writers such as N.F.S. Grundtvig, B. S. Ingemann and Steen Steensen Blicher have all used Mother Denmark as a national symbol of Denmark and a manifestation of national emotions.

In 1851, under influence of the Danish victory in the Battle of Isted, Elisabeth Jerichau Baumann created a painting of Mother Denmark in the form of a young woman, with a Dannebrog and Viking jewellery, holding an antique sword, walking through a field. The painting became a model for many later depictions of Mother Denmark.

In the second half of the 20th century, Mother Denmark references grew out of fashion. They have since then mainly been used in caricature drawing.

== Monuments and memorials ==
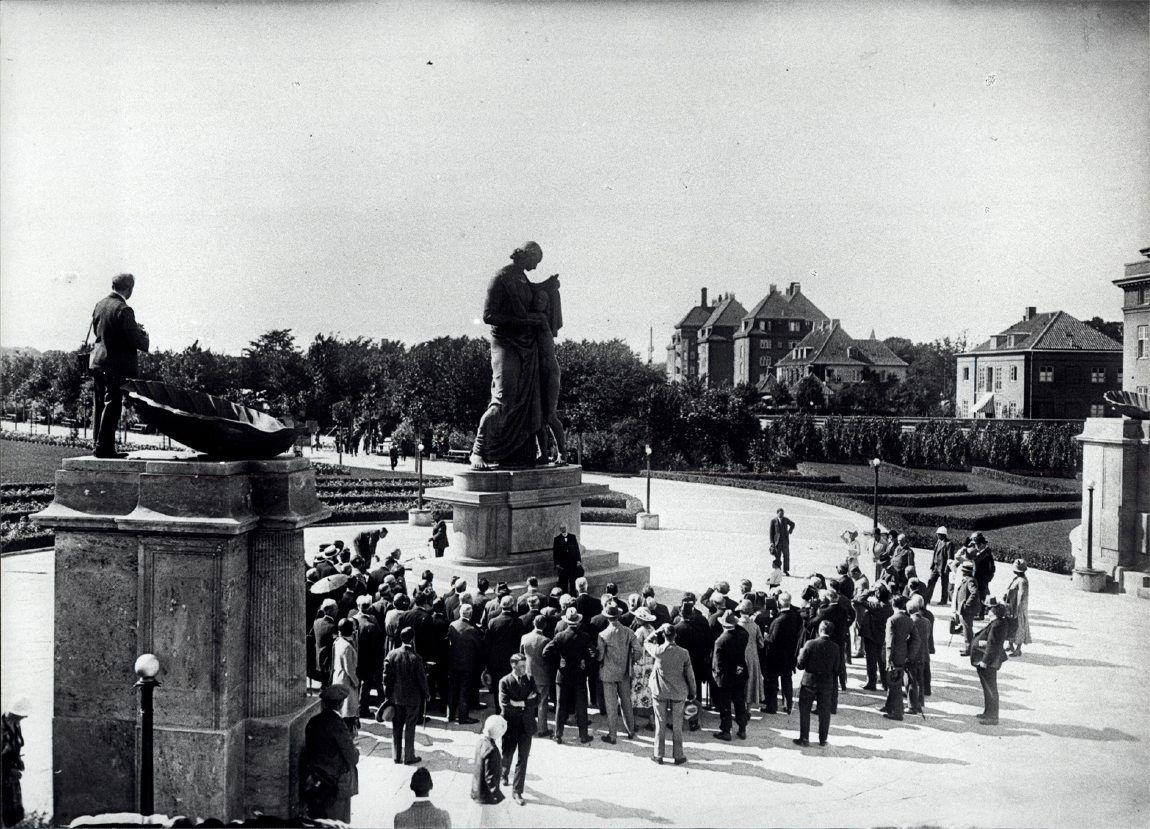
The Reunification Monument in July 1930

Many monuments and memorials that commemorate the 1920 Reunification Sønderjylland with Denmark incorporate a Mother Denmark figure, typically accompanied by a daughter, representing Sønderjylland. An example is the Reunification Memorial at the main entrance to Fælledparken in Copenhagen.

A statue of Mother Denmark is also seen in the Danish Emigrants Memorial in Copenhagen.

The sculptor Arne Bang has also created a Mother Denmark sculpture. A bronze cast of it is located in Fensmark.

== Cultural references ==
- Mor Danmark is a 1937 song by Mogens Lorentzen.

== Gallery ==
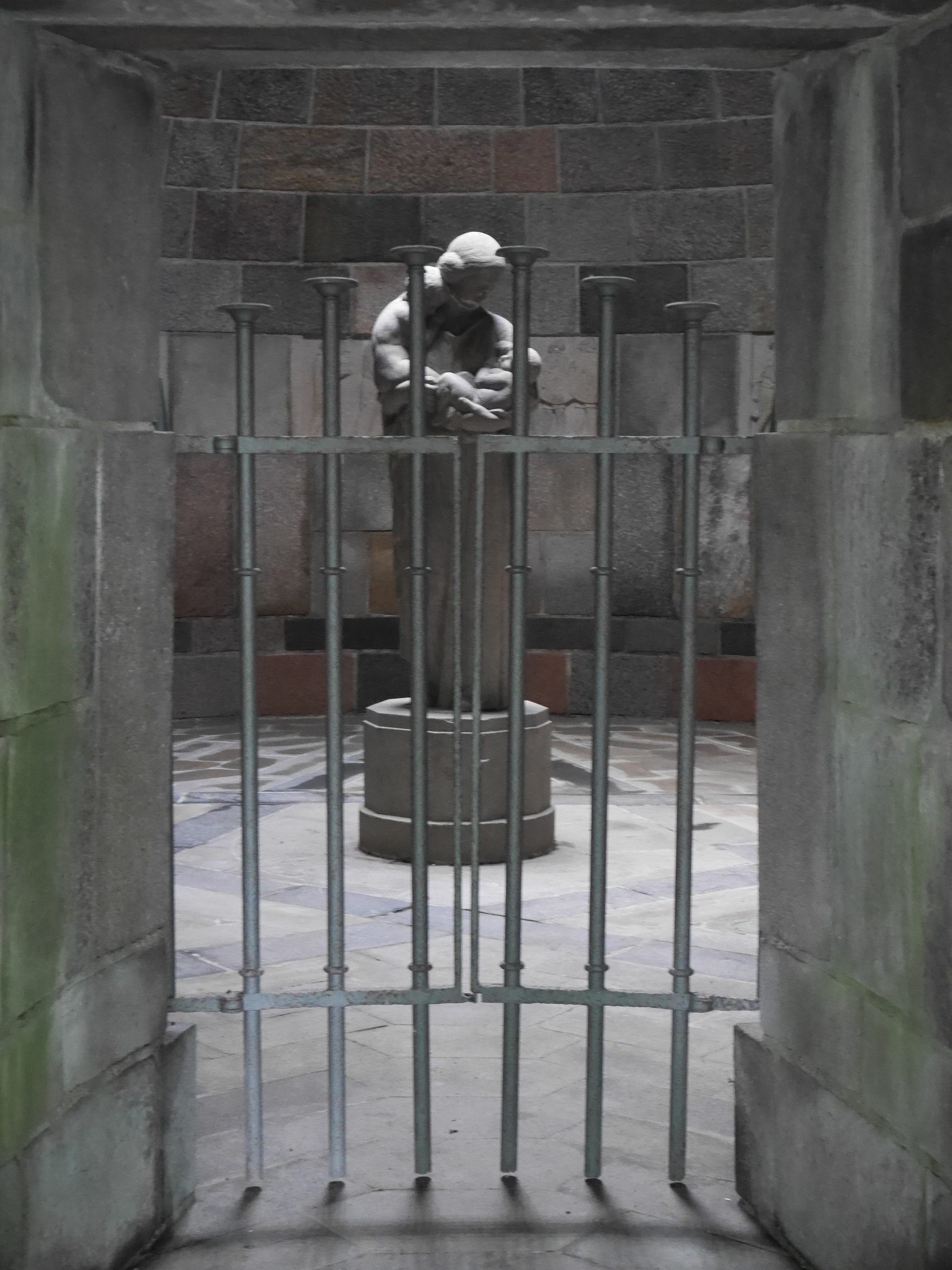
Mother Denmark sculpture as the focalpoint of the Memorial Mound in Copenhagen

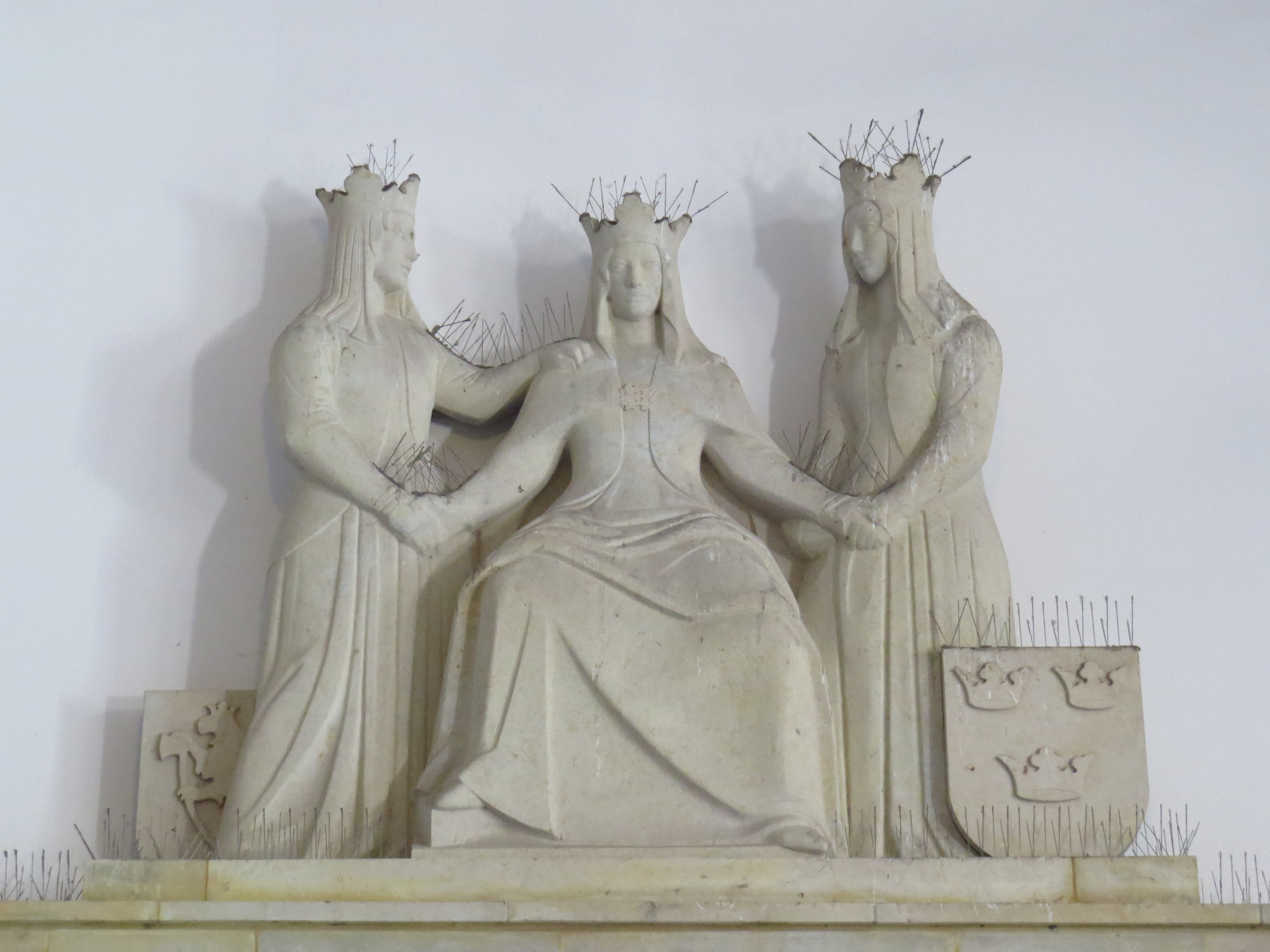
Relief in Christiansborg: Mother Denmark flanked by Sweden and Norway

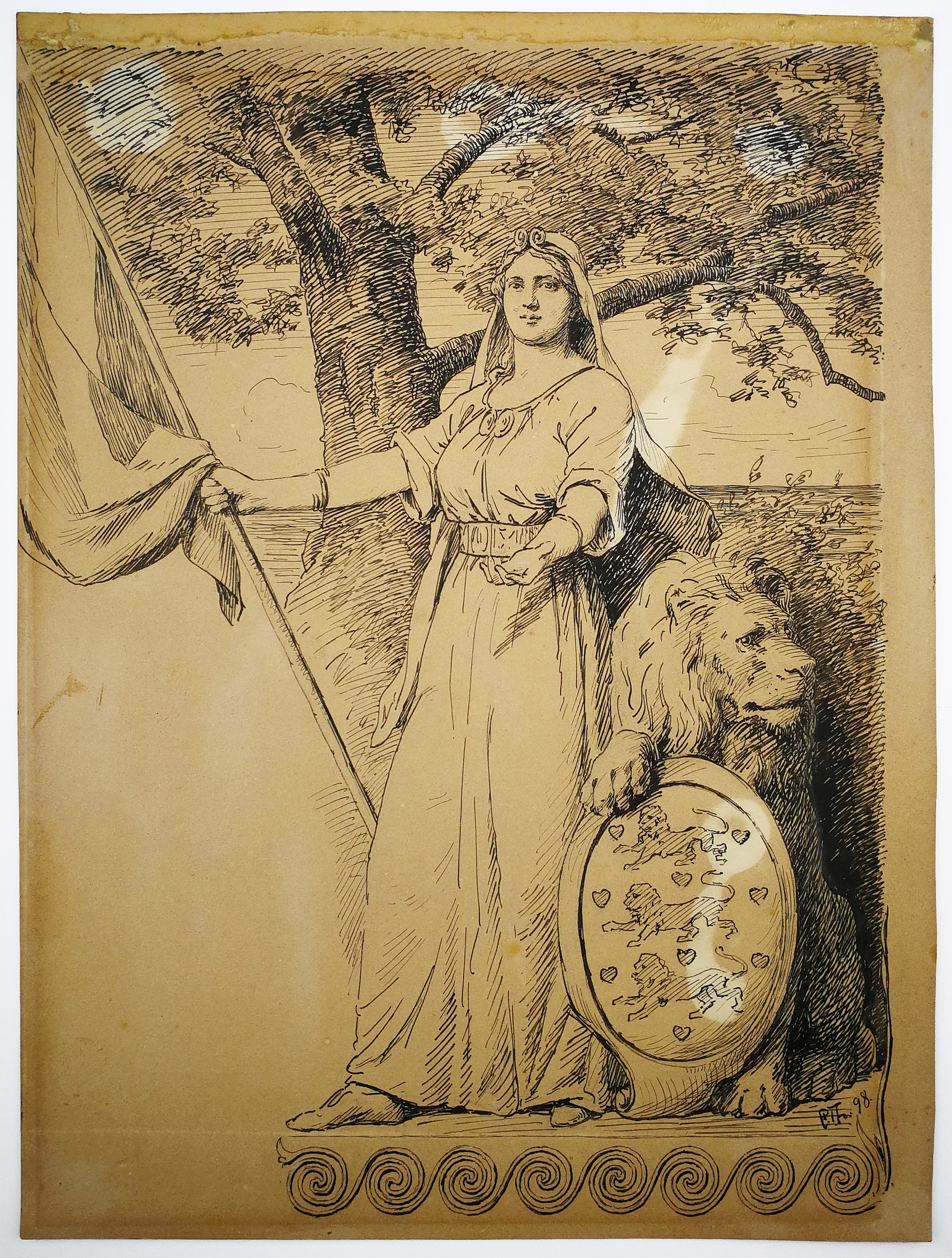
Carl Thomsen: Mother Denmark

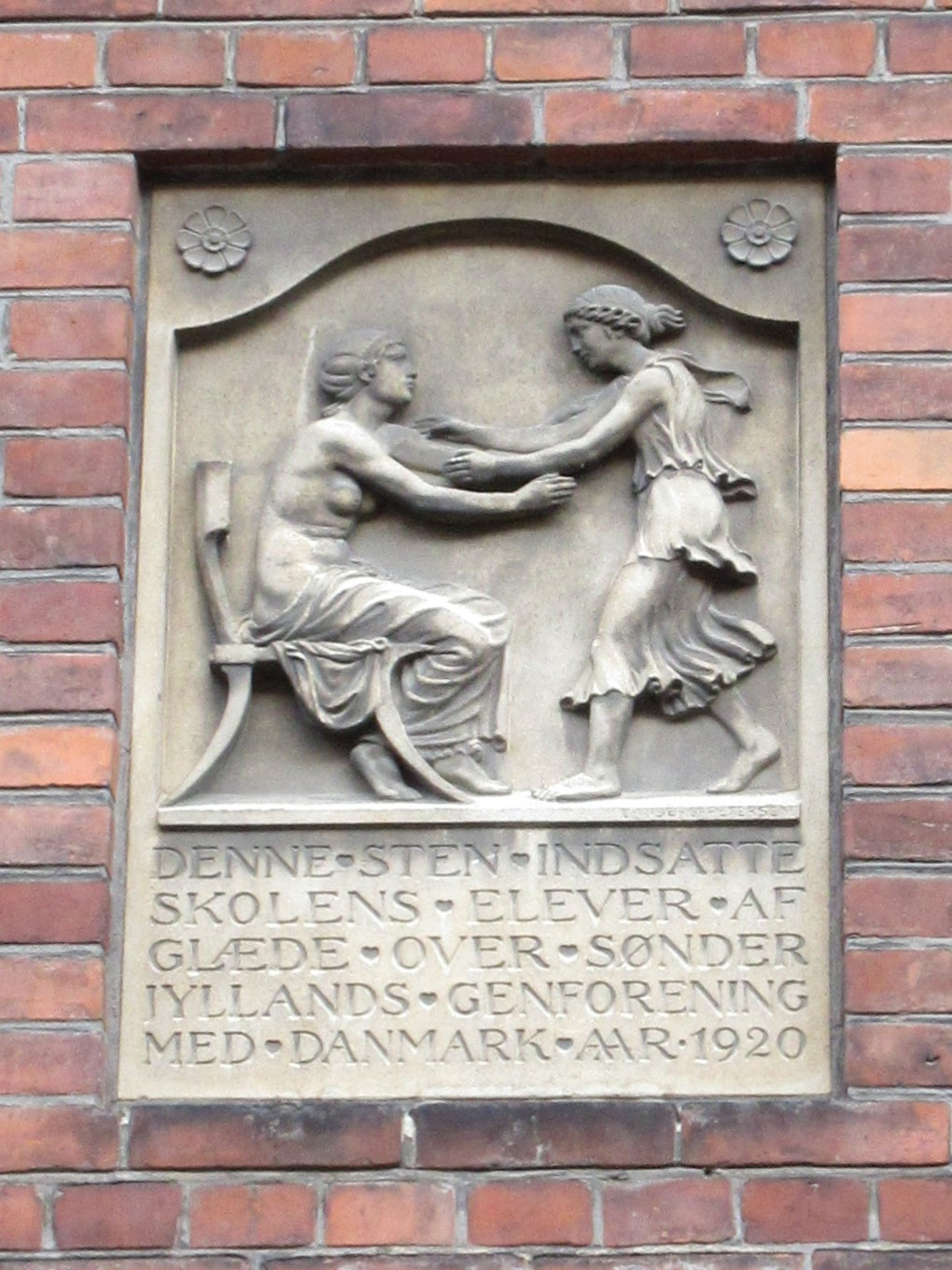
Reunification Memorial relief on Sjællandsgade School in Copenhagen
