= Memorial Mound, Copenhagen =

Memorial to Danish emigrants in Copenhagen, Denmark

Coordinates: 55°40′12″N 12°31′43″E

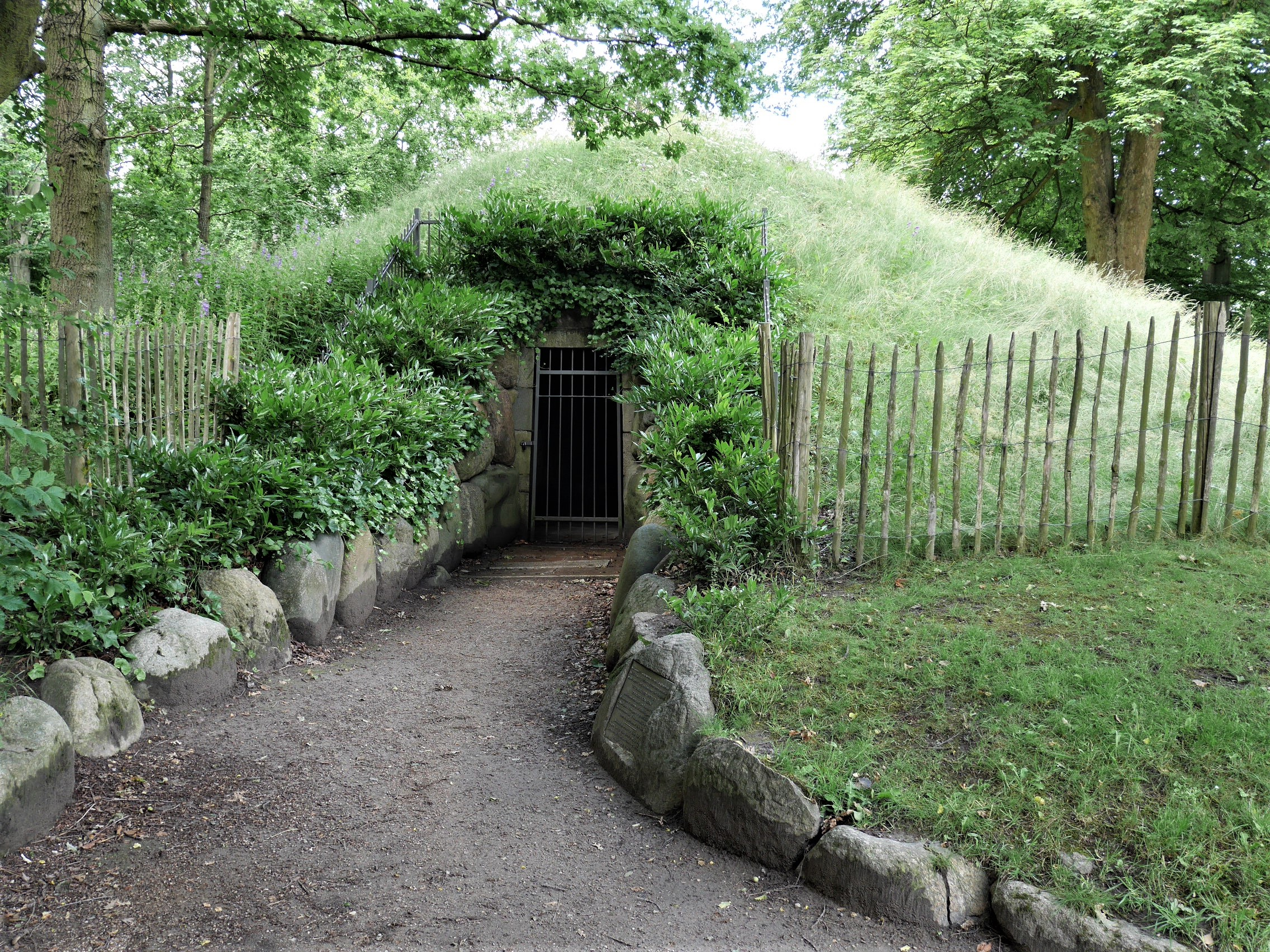
The Memorial Mound in 2020

The Memorial Mound (Danish: Mindehøjen), situated on a slope in Søndermarken, close to Frederiksberg Palace, is a memorial to Danish emigrants in Copenhagen, Denmark.

== Description ==
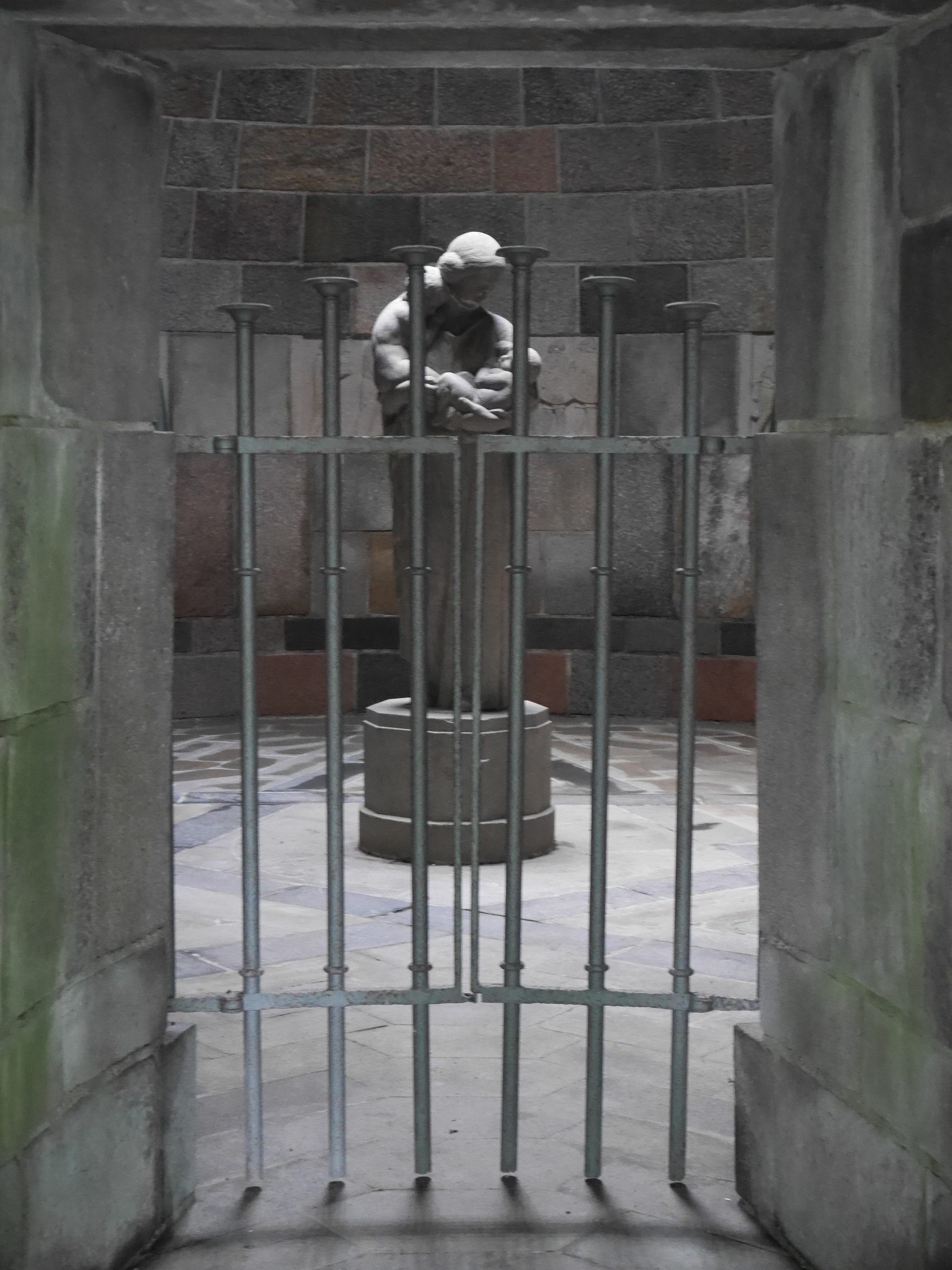
The Central Mother Denmark statue seen from the entrance

The mound measures 8 metres in diameter and is 5 metres tall. It is surrounded by tall trees and is reached along a narrow stone-lined passageway. Chiselled above the entrance is the inscription: "They who set out, never to return." At the top of the cupola is a metre-wide opening to let in daylight. At the centre of the room is the life-size figure of a woman who embraces her children, symbolizing Mother Denmark. Built into the wall are 9 bas-reliefs with symbolic descriptions of the emigrants' lives and activities abroad. In the floor is a five-pointed star representing the five continents.

The nine reliefs represent (beginning with the one to the right of the entrance as seen from the centre and moving around clockwise):

- The departure: a mother stands by a gate, looking at two sons that are leaving. A dog, representing loyalty, follows them.
- Struggling against hardships abroad
- Clearing the forest and building the first house
- Plowing the field, sowing the first seeds and planting new trees
- Christianity: the Protestant, the Catholic and crusaders
- Cattle Breeding: The shepherd with his dog. Girl with milk bucket. Slaughtering of livestock
- Seafaring: the merchant navy
- Crafts & trade: building the new land
- Family life: play and sports.

== History ==
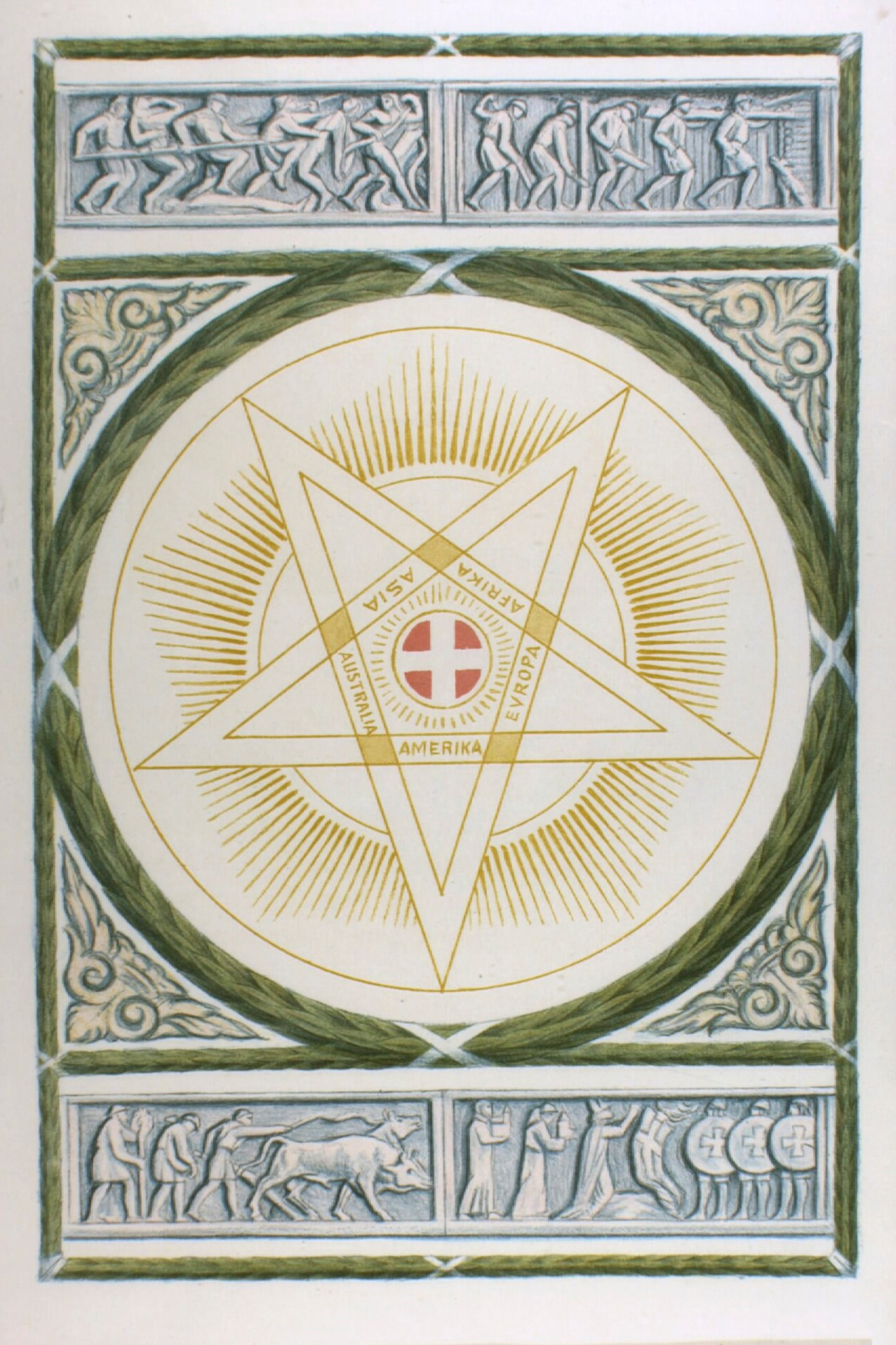
A print depicting the layout (floor) and some of the reliefs

In the early 1920s, Danish-Americans in the United States conceived the idea to erect a memorial in Copenhagen as a counterpoint to the traditions surrounding Rebild Hills celebrations in Jutland. A committee of Danish-Americans was set up which charged the sculptor Anders Bundgaard with creating an initial design proposal. His design was inspired by prehistoric Danish burial mounds. A number of possible locations were brought in play, including Jægersborg Dyrehave and Kastellet, but without gaining support. Anders Bundgaard was more in favour of a location in Søndermarken. The question was also subject to prolonged discussions in the media, both by Inspector of the Rotal Fardens Clemmen Jørgensen, Forskønnelseskommissionen and Fredningsnævnet. A location in Søndermarken was also criticized, both in national newspapers and the magazine Havekunst, for instance by the landscape architects such as Erik Erstad-Jørgensen and Gudmund Nyeland Brandt.

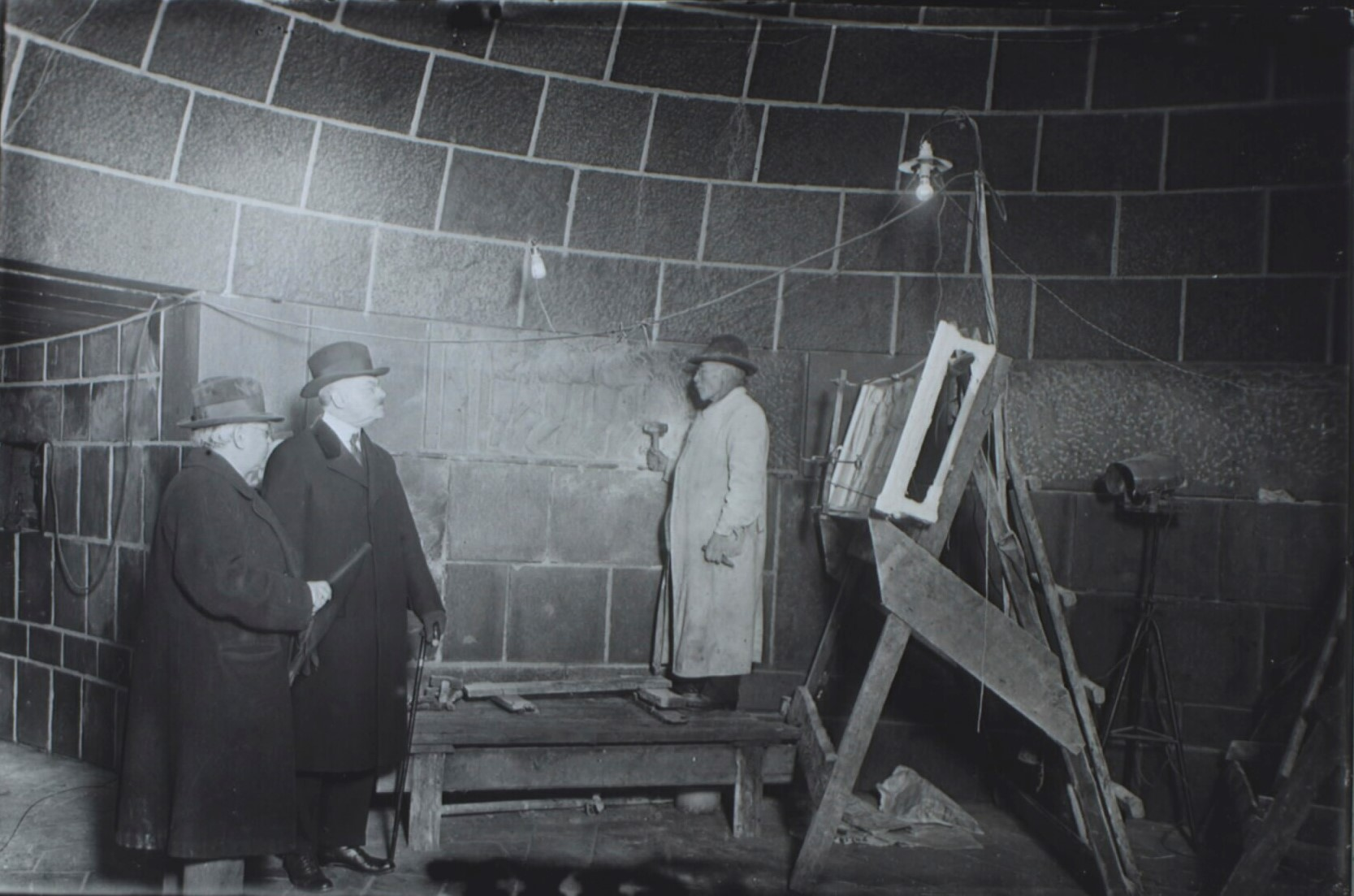
Anders Bundgaard working on the completion of the memorial

The location was in spite of all the criticism ultimately approved. Prominent members of the Danish community in most American states as well as in Argentina, Algeria, British Columbia, British East Africa, China, Congo, Cuba, Egypt, England, Madeira and South Africa and Spain.

The necessary funds were raised through a worldwide collection among expatriate Danes. Around $12,000 was collected and the monument was inaugurated in 1925 with a ceremony attended by 40,000 people, including the entire Danish royal family.

== Today ==
The memorial mound is open to the public every year on 4 July and only on July 4th.

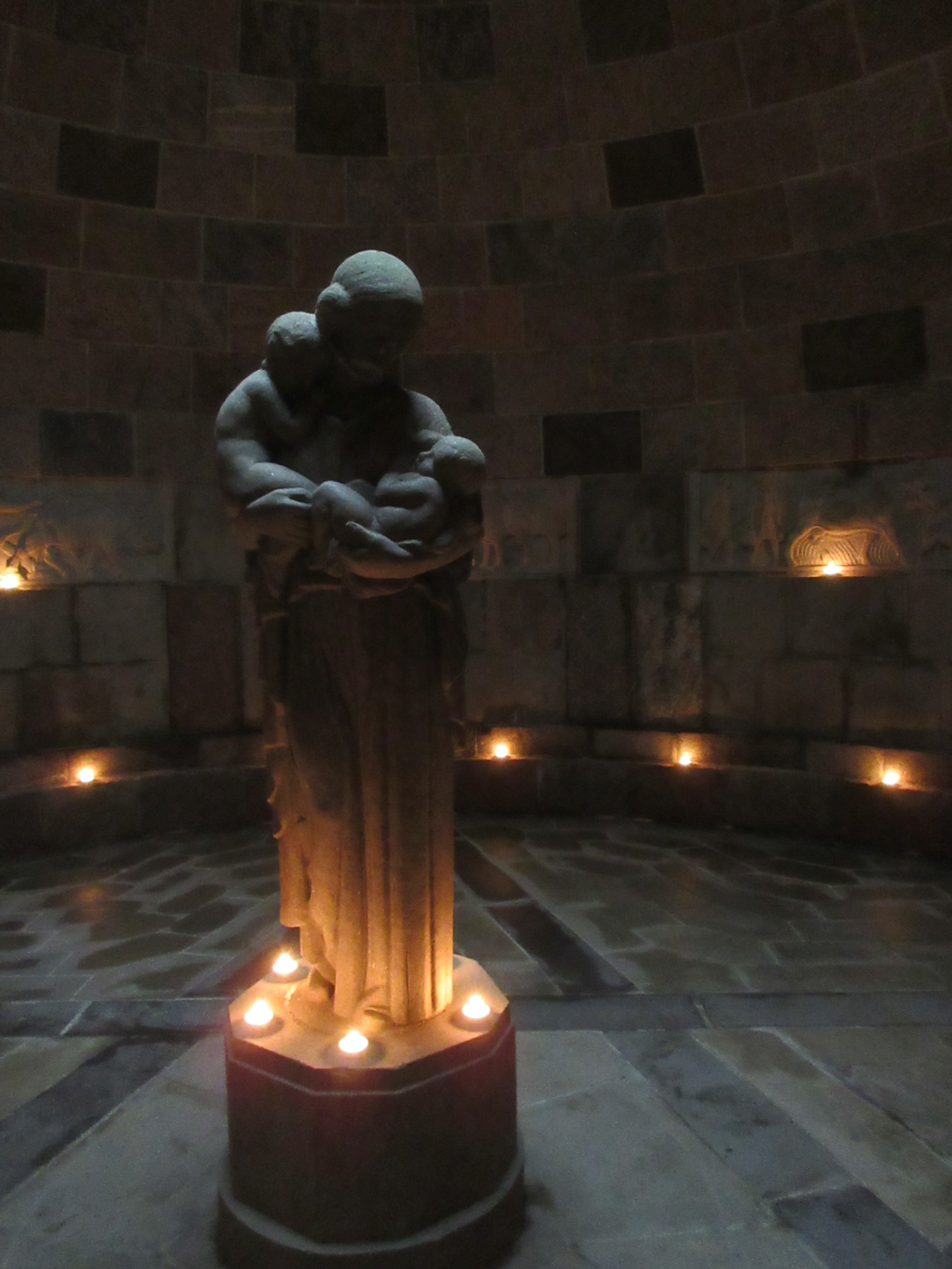

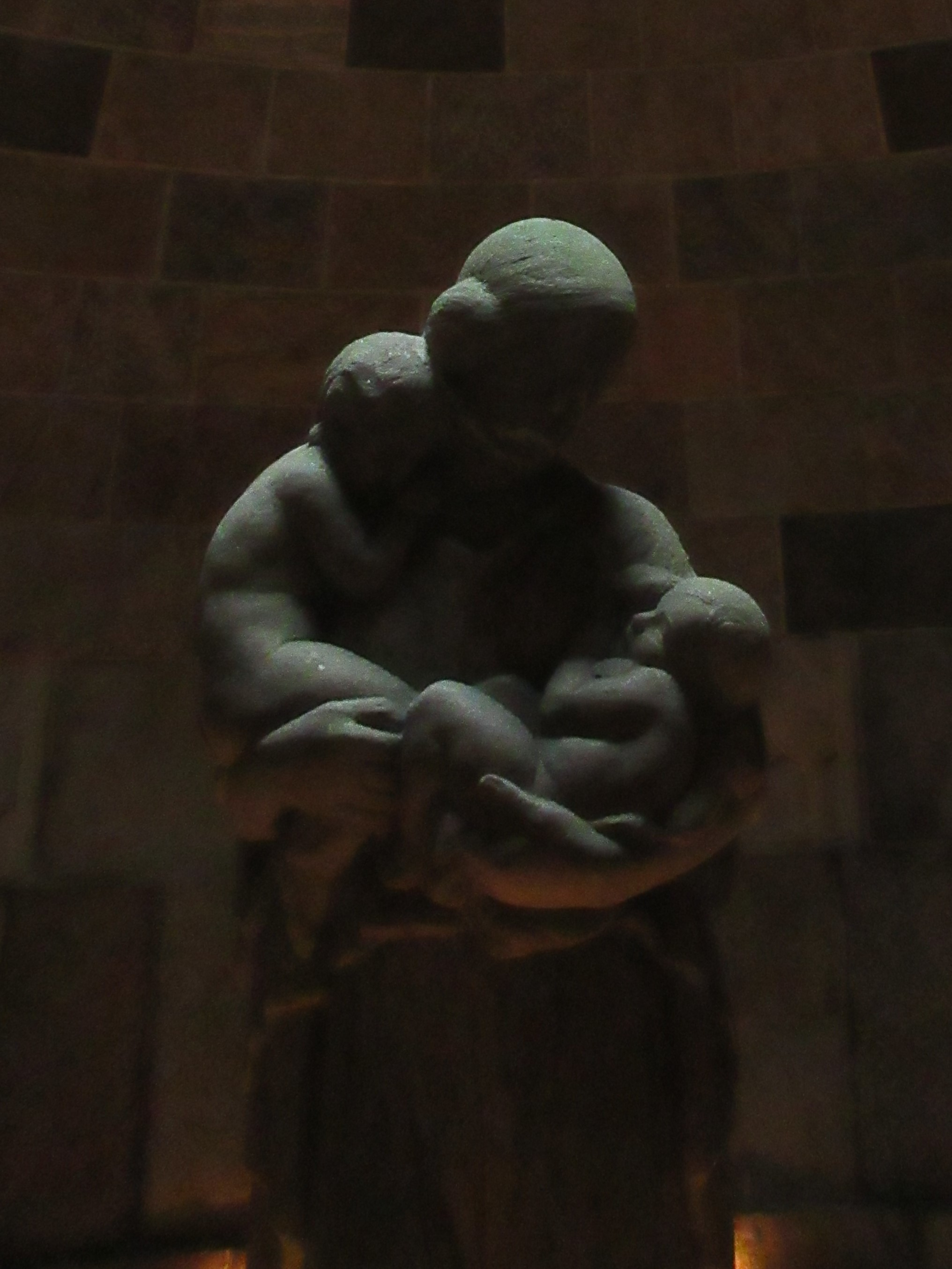

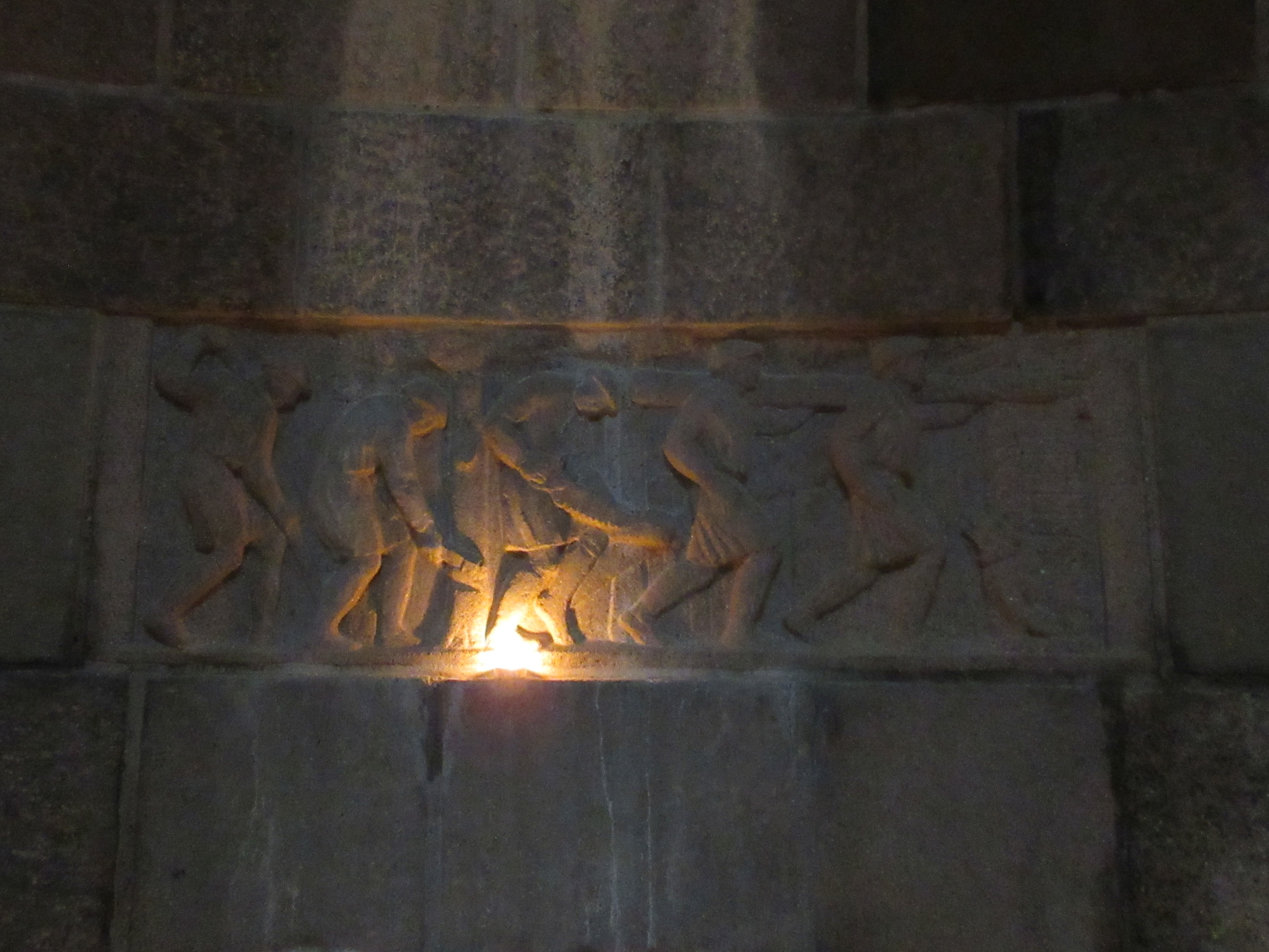
