= Cimbrian Bull =

1937 sculpture by Anders Bundgaard

Coordinates: 57°02′59″N 9°54′59″E

- Danish: Cimbrertyren
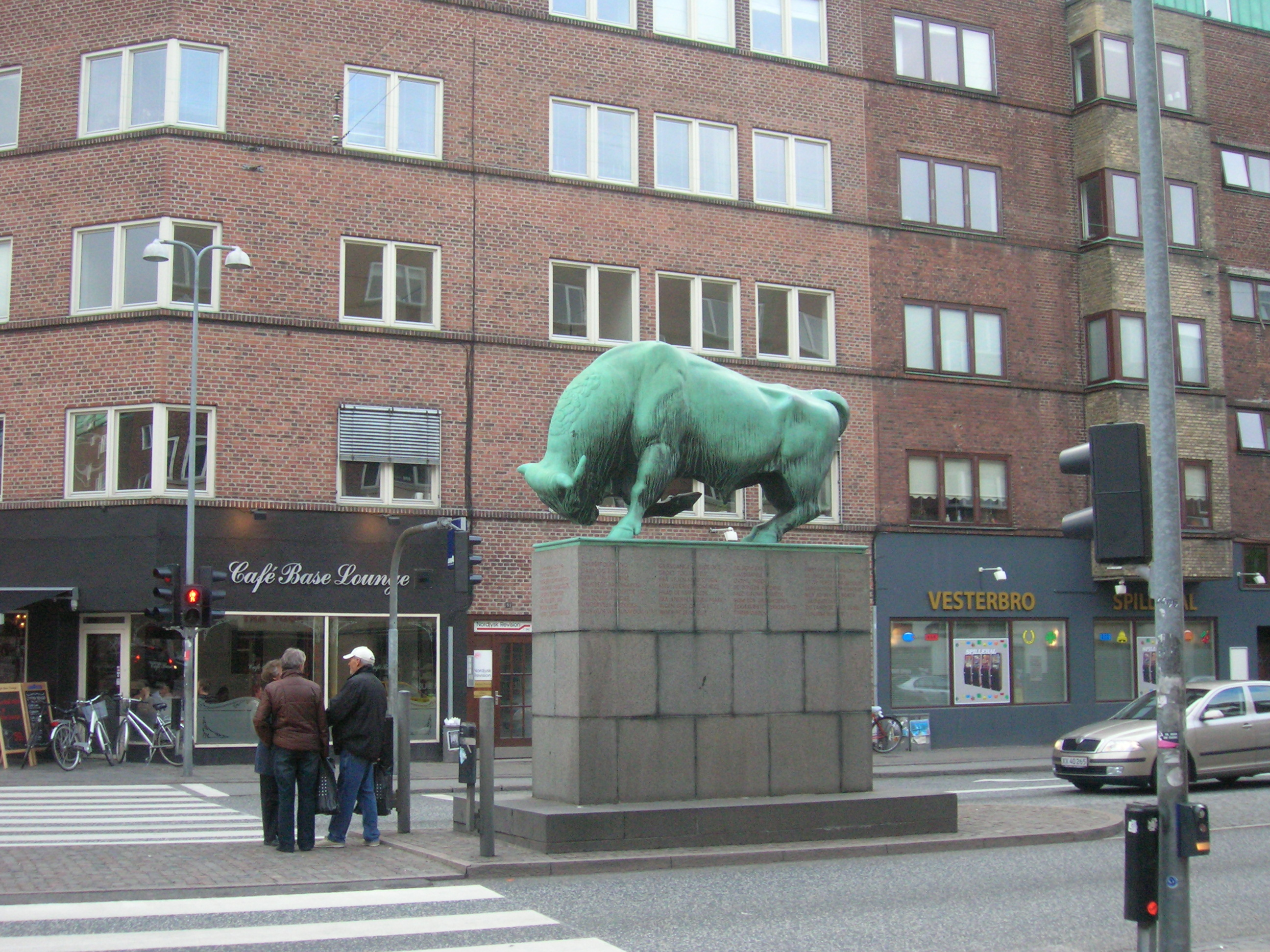
- Cimbrian Bull on Vesterbro in Aalborg
- Artist: Anders Bundgaard
- Completion date: 14 April 1937
- Medium: Bronze sculpture
- Location: Aalborg, Denmark

Cimbrian Bull (Danish: Cimbrertyren) is 1937 bronze sculpture by Anders Bundgaard. located in central Aalborg, Denmark. It has become a symbol of the city of Aalborg as well as of the Himmerland region of northern Jutland.

== Sculpture ==
The sculpture was created by the famous sculptor Anders Bundgaard, who also created the Gefion Fountain in Copenhagen. The design of the sculpture and pedestal, however, was the work of the architect Alfred Cock-Clausen, who also designed the liquor factory in Aalborg.

Cimbrertyren was paid for by Danish Distillers and is historically inseparably linked to the history of the Danish liquor factories, since the current position of the bull is also the site of the old Danish Distillers factory, which was shut down in 1931.

== Symbol ==
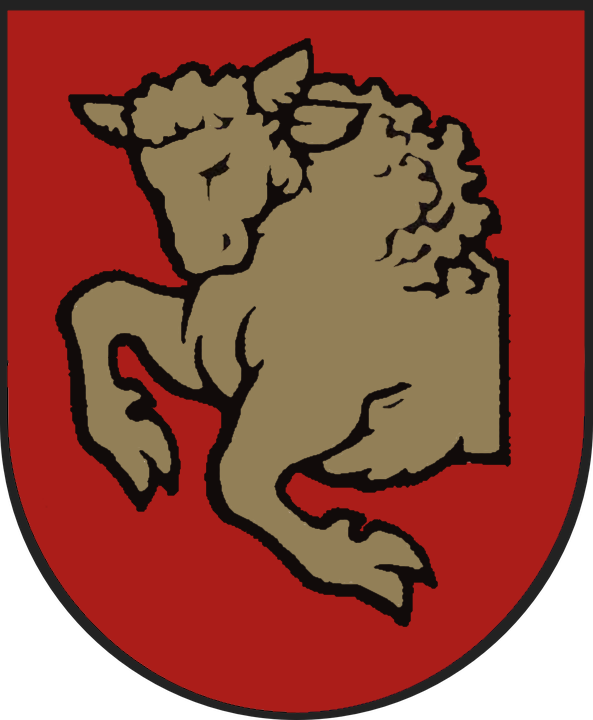
Aars Municipality coat of arms, featuring the Cimbrian bull

The bull is a symbol of the old Germanic tribe that lived in the Himmerland area, the Cimbri. They worshipped the bull as a god of fertility. It is mostly used as a symbol in Himmerland. The Cimbrian bull is used on many things from municipality shields to company logos. The Cimbrian bull has been used in the logo of Himmerland Forsikring gS (Himmerland Insurance) and the coats of arms of Aars Municipality and the former Aalborg Amt.
