= Reunification Monument, Copenhagen =

Coordinates: 55°41′57″N 12°34′29″E

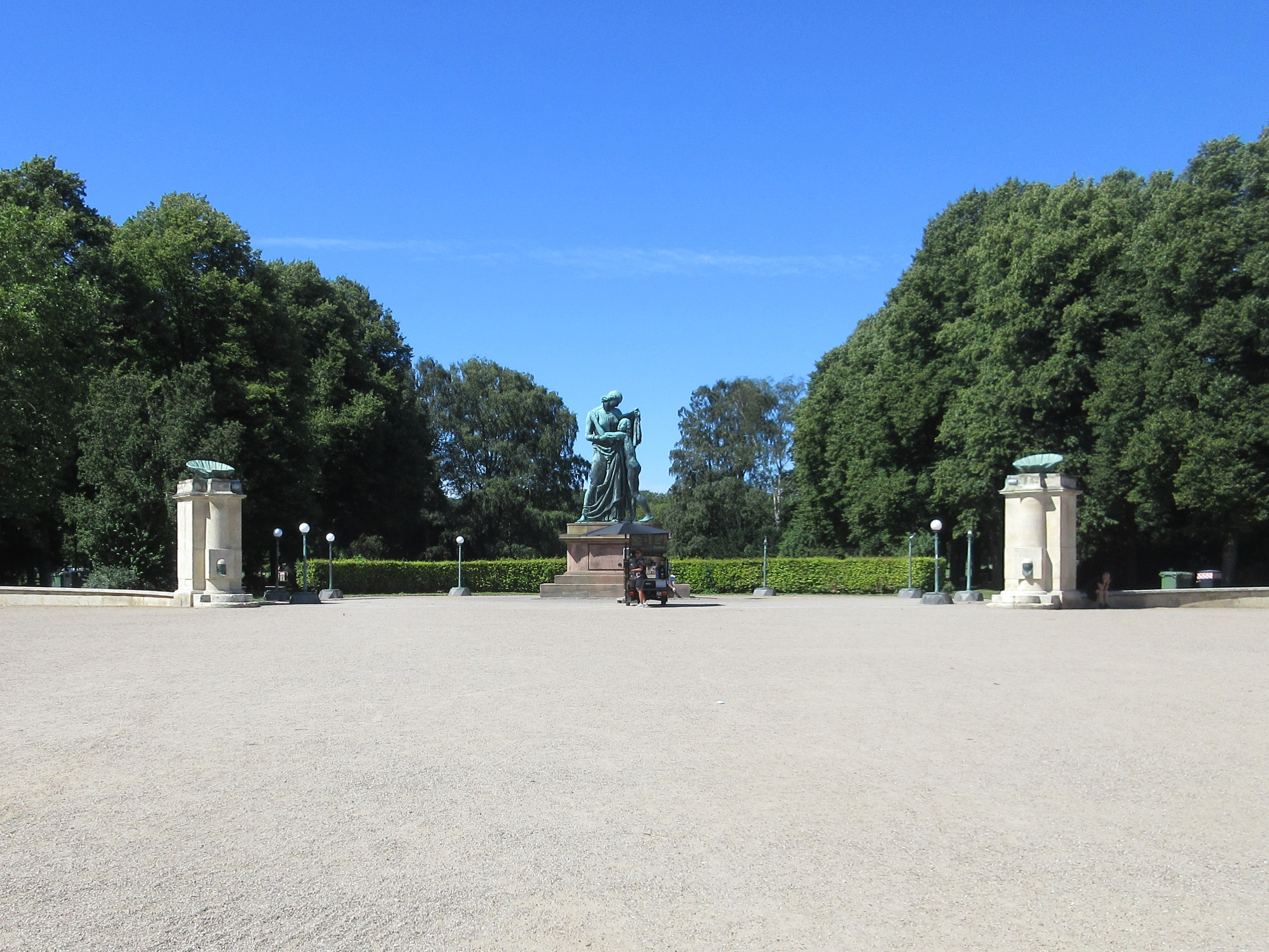
The entrance to Fælledparken with the memorial in 2022.

The Reunification Monument (Danish: Genforeningsmonumentet) marks the main entrance to Fælled Park from Trianglen in the Østerbro district of Copenhagen, Denmark. It was created by the artist Axel Poulsen, in collaboration with the architect Holger Jacobsen, to commemorate the reunification of Sønderjylland with Denmark in 1920.

== Description ==
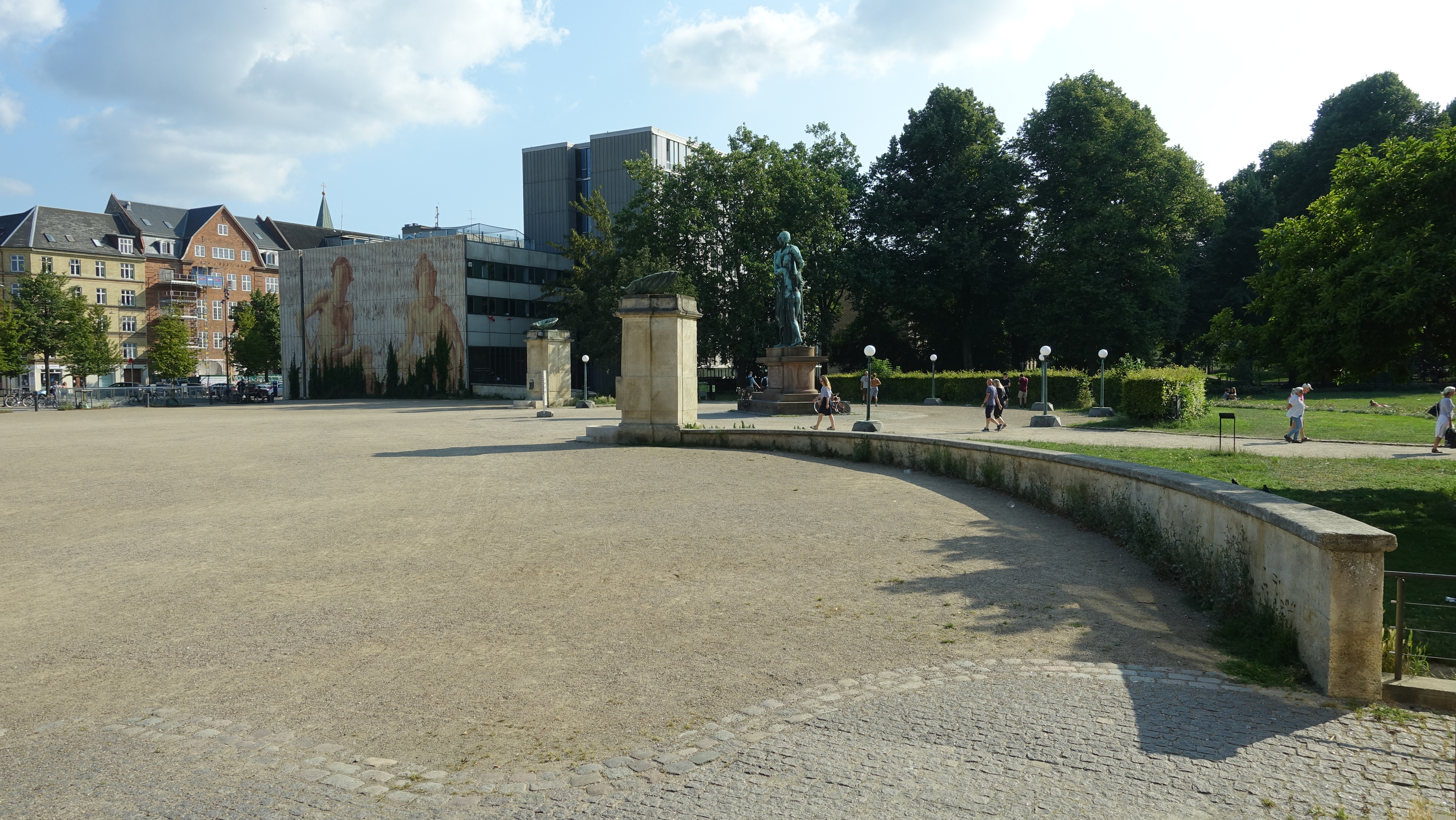
The entrance to Fælledparken with the memorial in 2022.

The main feature of the monument is Axel Poulsen's bronze sculpture of a mother holding a baby girl, wrapped in a shawl, up to her chest. The sculpture stands on a sandstone plinth. The front of the plinth features an inscription in carved lettering: "TIL MINDE OM / SÖNDERJYLLANDS / GENFORENING MED / MODERLANDE" (To commemorate Sønderjyllands' reunification with the motherland). The rear side of the plinth features another inscription in carved lettering: "SKÆNKET STADEN / KÖBENHAVN / AFCARLSBERGFONDET / 1930" (Presented to the city of Copenhagen by the Carlsberg Foundation, 1930). The bronze sculpture stands 5.5 metres (18 ft) tall, and the total height of the monument is around 8 metres (26 ft).

The monument is flanked by two square gate pillars, each topped by a seashell in bronze with the concave side facing upwards. Each pillar has its front decorated with a Doric pilaster. The gate pillars measure approximately 475 by 365 by 180 centimetres (15.6 by 12.0 by 5.9 ft). Their rear sides connect to two low, ramp-like walls in French travertine that flank the entrance to the park.

== History ==
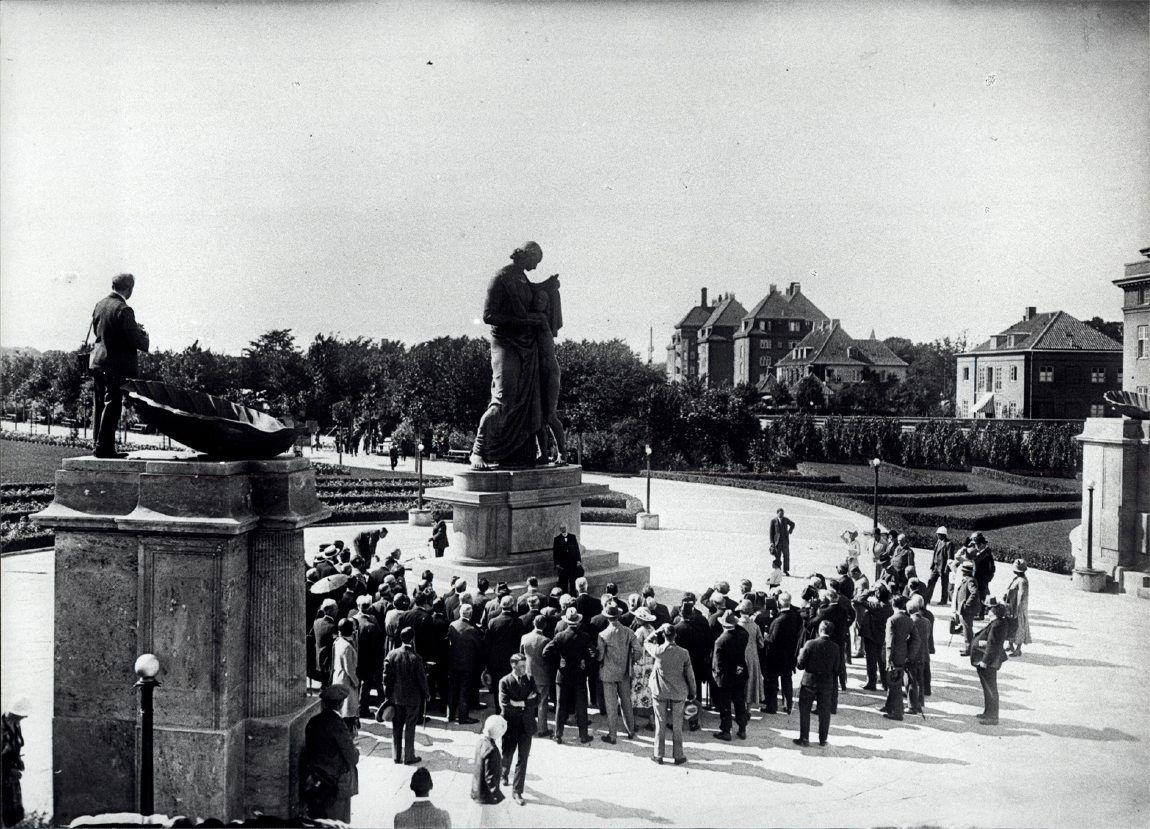
The Reunification Monument in July 1930

Sønderjylland was reunited with Denmark on 15 June 1920. The City of Copenhagen launched a preliminary competition for the design of a reunification monument in 1925. The competition opened for a number of possible locations. A total of 112 entries were submitted, of which 10 received awards. The final monument was a donation from the Carlsberg Foundation. Axel Poulsen was charged with the design in 1926. The bronze sculpture was cast in Lauritz Rasmussen's bronze foundry in Nørrebro. The monument was unveiled on 1 June 1930. Mayor Peder Jørgen Pedersen and chairman of the Carlsberg Foundation Anders Bjørn (Asbjørn) Drachmann spoke at the ceremony.
