= Anders Bundgaard =

Danish sculptor (1864–1937)

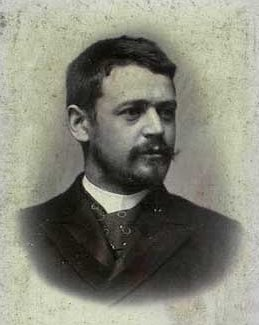
- Born: 7 August 1864; Ersted, Denmark
- Died: 19 September 1937 (aged 73); Copenhagen, Denmark
- Education: Royal Danish Academy of Fine Arts
- Known for: Sculpture

Signature
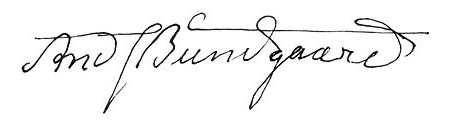

Anders Bundgaard (7 August 1864 – 19 September 1937) was a Danish sculptor.

== Biography ==
Bundgaard was born at Ersted near Skørping, Denmark. He was the son of Jens Christensen Tved and Maren Andersdatter Bundgaard.

When Bundgaard arrived in Copenhagen, he undertook a variety of odd jobs until his artistic talents were discovered by Emil Blichfeldt, who encouraged him to attend the Copenhagen Technical College (1884–1885) and later the Royal Danish Academy of Fine Arts (1885–1887). There, he was introduced to French Naturalism by Norwegian-Danish sculptor Stephan Sinding, giving his works a rather dramatic touch. He debuted at the Charlottenborg Spring Exhibition in 1888.

Bundgaard was awarded several scholarships: Raben-Levetzau (1889, 1891); Hielmstierne-Rosencrone (1891); Ancker (1894). He conducted study trips to Paris (1889–1892), then to Genoa, Naples, Pompeii, Rome, and Florence; again Paris (189); Italy (1894–1895); Italy, Egypt and Greece (1899–1900); and Italy (1921–1922). His study trips in Paris provided him with inspiration from Jules Dalou, Alexandre Falguière and Auguste Rodin. In addition, his father's interest in mythology and folk tales reinforced his imaginative approach which can be seen in his robust, Naturalistic works, often made of granite. His interest in ecclesiastical art from the Middle Ages is also apparent.

Bundgaard undertook several major decorative projects including sculptures for the recently built Copenhagen City Hall (1894–1899) and for Christiansborg Palace (1907–1928), where his four majestic figures stand over the entrance to the parliamentary chamber. His works often exhibit a mythological, nationalistic slant, as can be seen in two of his masterpieces, the Gefion Fountain (1908) on Copenhagen's waterfront and the Cimbrian Bull (1937) in Aalborg. He completed a number of monuments in commemoration of the volunteers from 1848 and 1864, as well as the Reunification Monument in Randers. He made statues of Enrico Dalgas (1916) and Christian von Lüttichau (1918). He also completed decorative work at Christiansborg Palace in Copenhagen (1928).

Many of Bundgaard's original plaster models can be seen in the Thingbæk Kalkminer Museum, a former mine near the Rebild National Park.

== Personal life ==
In 1894, he married Elisabeth Kabell (1874–1957).

Bundgaard was made a knight in the Order of the Danneborg. He died at Copenhagen.

He was buried at Gravlev kirkegard in Rebild Municipality.

== Selected works ==
- Gefion Fountain, Copenhagen (1908)
- Granskende pige, Copenhagen (1934)
- Cimber Bull, Aalborg (1937)
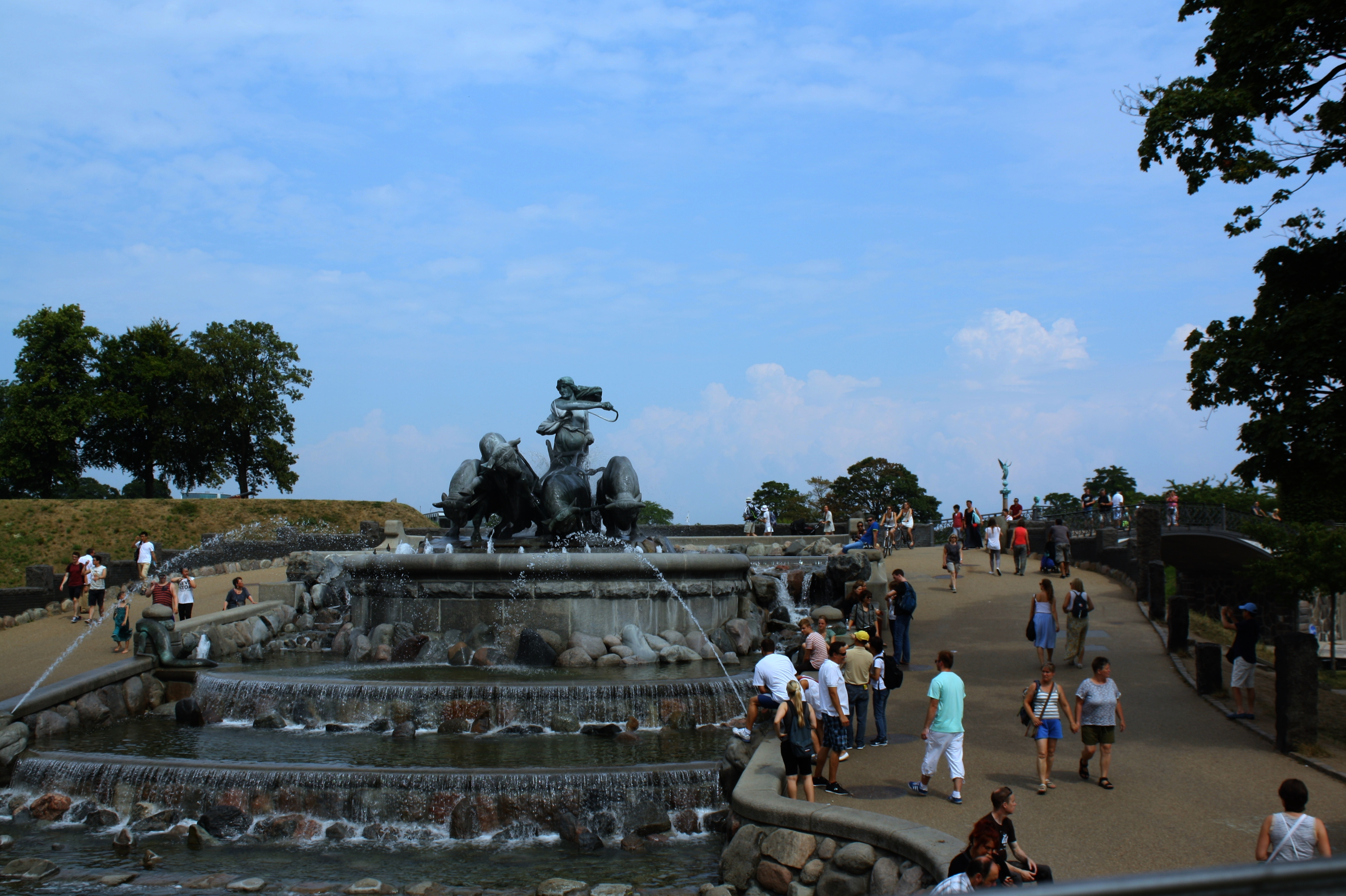

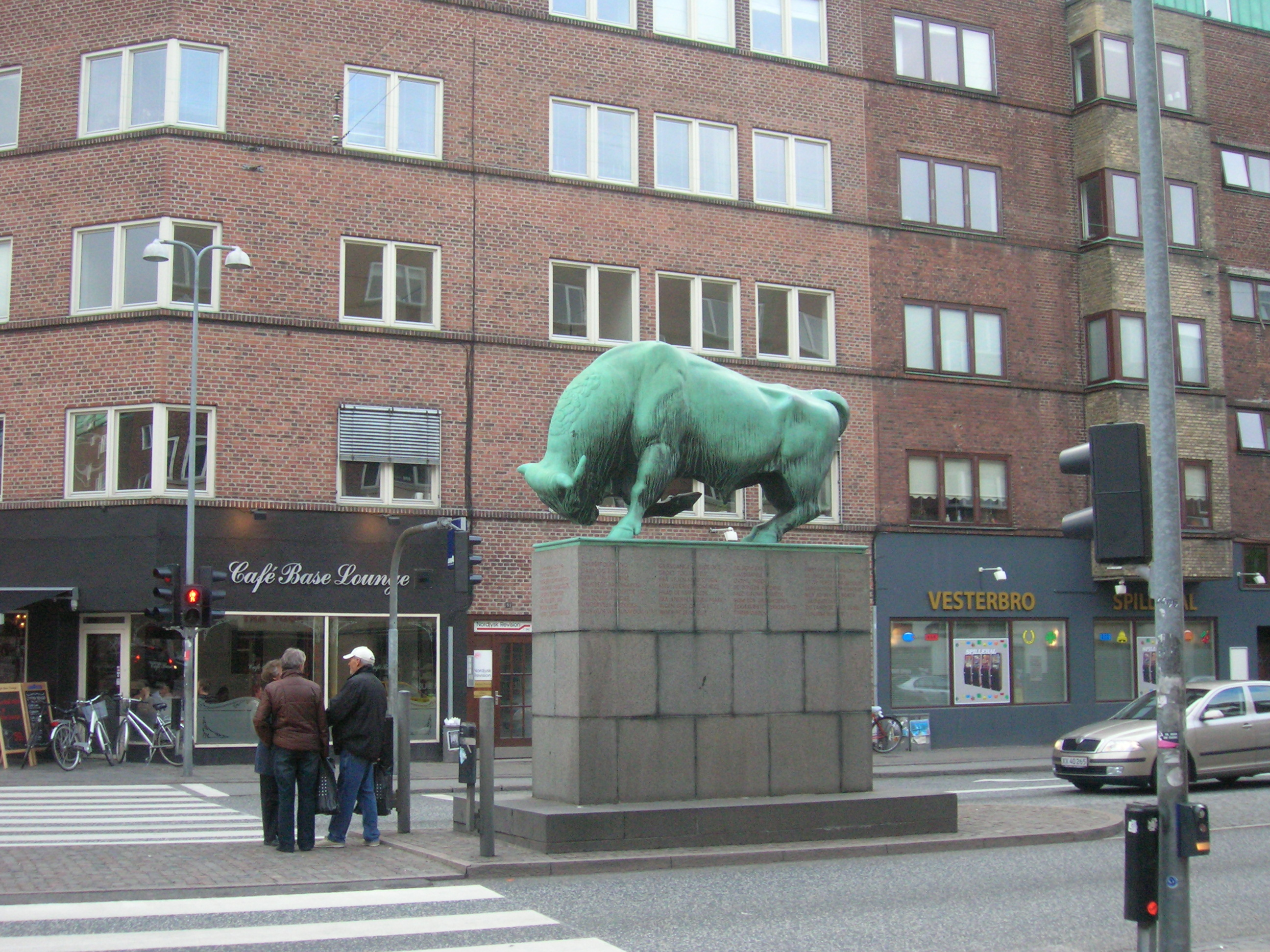
Cimbrian Bull in Aalborg (1937)

== See also ==
- Danish sculpture
- Memorial Mound, Copenhagen
