= Gefion Fountain =

Fountain in Copenhagen, Denmark

Coordinates: 55°41′22″N 12°35′51″E

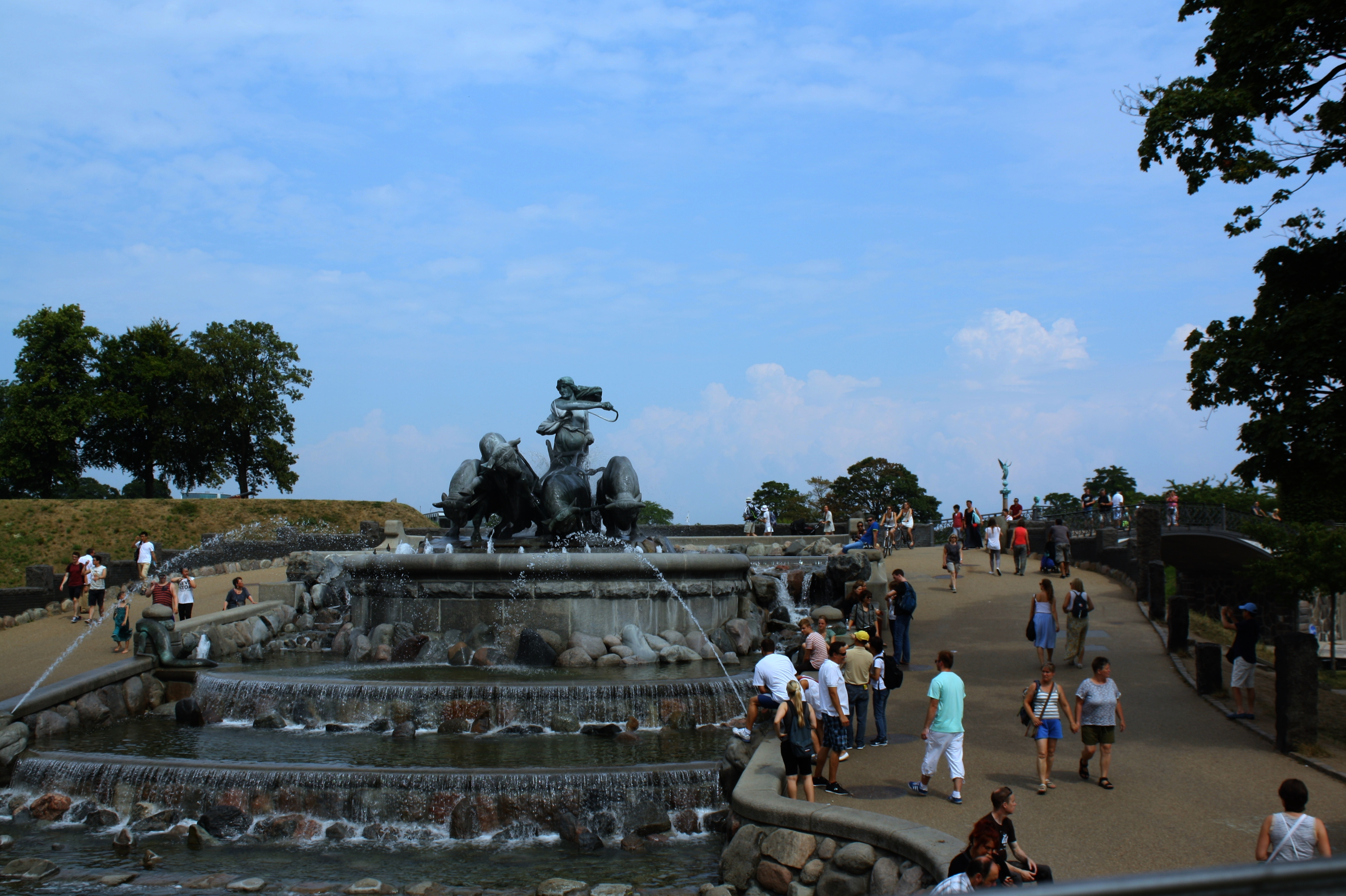
The Gefion fountain

The Gefion Fountain (Danish: Gefionspringvandet) is a large fountain on the harbour front in Copenhagen, Denmark. It features a large-scale group of oxen pulling a plow and being driven by the Norse goddess Gefjon. It is located in Nordre Toldbod area next to Kastellet and immediately south of Langelinie.

== History ==
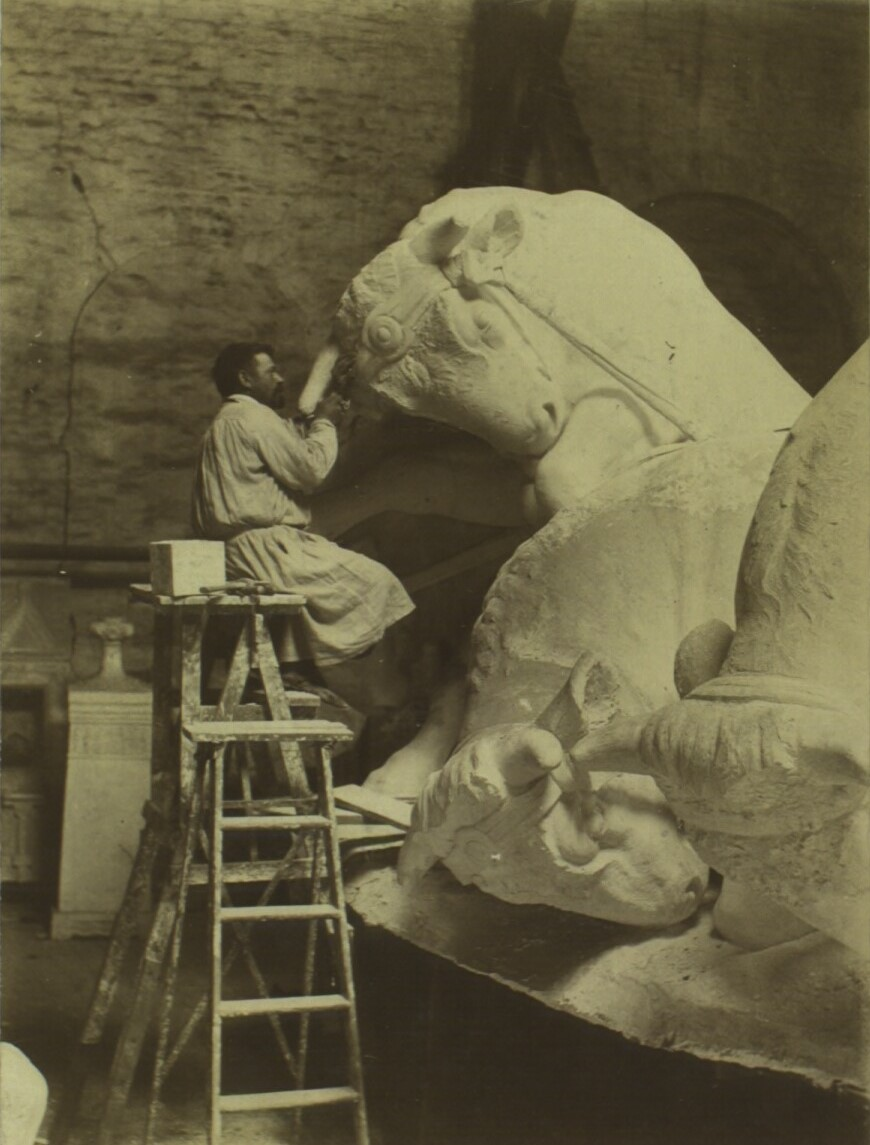
Anders Bundgaard working on the fountain

The fountain was donated to the city of Copenhagen by the Carlsberg Foundation on the occasion of the brewery's 50-year anniversary. It was originally supposed to be located in the main town square outside city hall, but it was decided instead to build it near the Øresund in its current location near Kastellet ("The Citadel").

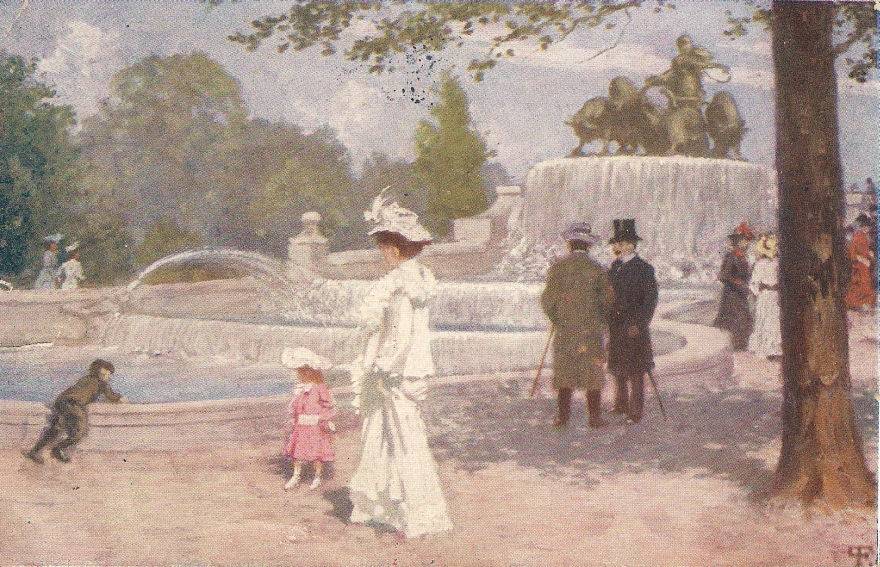
People strolling at the Gefion Fountain: Painting by Paul Gustav Fischer

It was designed by Danish artist Anders Bundgaard, who sculpted the naturalistic figures 1897–99. The basins and decorations were completed in 1908. The fountain was first activated on July 14, 1908.

The fountain underwent extensive renovations starting in 1999. The fountain was out of commission for many years, and was re-inaugurated in September 2004.

== Iconography ==
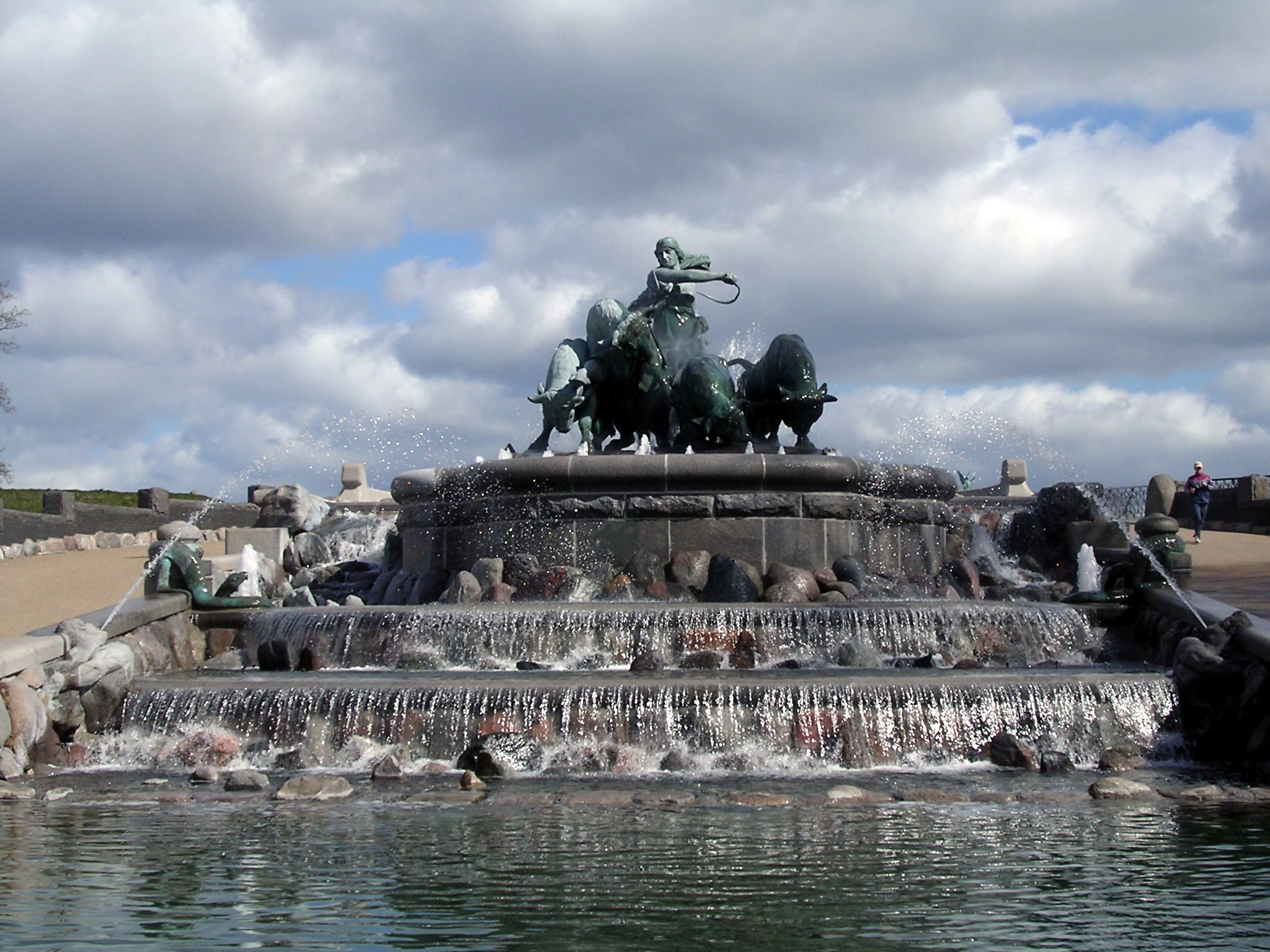
The Gefion fountain

The fountain depicts the mythical story of the creation of the island of Zealand on which Copenhagen is located. The legend appears in Ragnarsdrápa, a 9th-century Skaldic poem recorded in the 13th century Prose Edda, and in Ynglinga saga as recorded in Snorri Sturluson's 13th century Heimskringla.

According to Ynglinga saga, the Swedish king Gylfi promised Gefjun the territory she could plow in a night. She turned her four sons into oxen, and the territory they plowed out of the earth was then thrown into the Danish sea between Scania and the island of Fyn. The hole became a lake called Lögrinn and Leginum (locative). Snorri identifies the lake Löginn, as the lake of Old Sigtuna west of Stockholm, i.e., Lake Mälaren, an identification that he returns to later in the Saga of Olaf the Holy. The same identification of Löginn/Leginum as Mälaren appears in Ásmundar saga kappabana, where it is the lake by Agnafit (modern Stockholm), and also in Knýtlinga saga.

In spite of Snorri's identification, tourist information about the fountain identifies the resultant lake as Vänern , Sweden's largest lake, citing the fact that modern maps show that Zealand and the lake resemble each other in size and shape.

Snorri, however, was well acquainted with Vänern as he had visited Västergötland in 1219. When he referred to this lake he called it Vænir.

== Cultural references ==
The Gefion Fountain is seen at 0:48:47 in the 1972 Olsen-banden film The Olsen Gang's Big Score. It is also seen in the feature films Jeg elsker en anden (1946), Mor bag rattet (1965), and Min søsters børn vælter byen (1968).

== Reception ==
Scholar Hilda Ellis Davidson comments that "some of the power of the old tale of Gefjon, creator of the islands, has been superbly expressed in the great fountain at the water's edge in Copenhagen, depicting her ploughing through the sea in a cloud of rising spray with her giant beasts."
