= List of minor planets: 490001–491000 =

The following is a partial list of minor planets, running from minor-planet number 490001 through 491000, inclusive. The primary data for this and other partial lists is based on JPL's "Small-Body Orbital Elements" and data available from the Minor Planet Center. Critical list information is also provided by the MPC, unless otherwise specified from Lowell Observatory. A detailed description of the table's columns and additional sources are given on the main page including a complete list of every page in this series, and a statistical break-up on the dynamical classification of minor planets.

Also see the summary list of all named bodies in numerical and alphabetical order, and the corresponding naming citations for the number range of this particular list. New namings may only be added to this list after official publication, as the preannouncement of names is condemned by the Working Group for Small Bodies Nomenclature of the International Astronomical Union.

Near-Earth obj.	MBA (inner)	MBA (outer)	Centaur
Mars-crosser	MBA (middle)	Jupiter trojan	Trans-Neptunian obj.
Unclassified

== 490001–490100 ==
Designation			Discovery			Properties		Ref
Permanent	Provisional	Named after	Date	Site	Discoverer(s)	Category	Diam.	Ref
490001	2008 SZ_{201}	—	September 26, 2008	Kitt Peak	Spacewatch	·	1.5 km	MPC · JPL
490002	2008 SJ_{205}	—	September 26, 2008	Kitt Peak	Spacewatch	·	550 m	MPC · JPL
490003	2008 SB_{206}	—	September 26, 2008	Kitt Peak	Spacewatch	·	580 m	MPC · JPL
490004	2008 ST_{208}	—	September 27, 2008	Mount Lemmon	Mount Lemmon Survey	·	890 m	MPC · JPL
490005	2008 SL_{218}	—	September 30, 2008	La Sagra	OAM	·	1.3 km	MPC · JPL
490006	2008 ST_{218}	—	September 30, 2008	La Sagra	OAM	EUN	880 m	MPC · JPL
490007	2008 SF_{224}	—	September 26, 2008	Kitt Peak	Spacewatch	H	380 m	MPC · JPL
490008	2008 SU_{231}	—	September 5, 2008	Kitt Peak	Spacewatch	·	2.3 km	MPC · JPL
490009	2008 SR_{233}	—	September 28, 2008	Mount Lemmon	Mount Lemmon Survey	·	2.4 km	MPC · JPL
490010	2008 SZ_{236}	—	September 7, 2008	Mount Lemmon	Mount Lemmon Survey	·	3.2 km	MPC · JPL
490011	2008 SS_{237}	—	September 20, 2008	Mount Lemmon	Mount Lemmon Survey	·	690 m	MPC · JPL
490012	2008 SC_{238}	—	September 21, 2008	Kitt Peak	Spacewatch	KOR	1.4 km	MPC · JPL
490013	2008 SV_{243}	—	September 30, 2008	Mount Lemmon	Mount Lemmon Survey	·	600 m	MPC · JPL
490014	2008 SE_{245}	—	September 5, 2008	Kitt Peak	Spacewatch	L4	8.2 km	MPC · JPL
490015	2008 SM_{250}	—	September 23, 2008	Kitt Peak	Spacewatch	·	680 m	MPC · JPL
490016	2008 SE_{257}	—	September 22, 2008	Kitt Peak	Spacewatch	·	2.7 km	MPC · JPL
490017	2008 SB_{260}	—	September 23, 2008	Mount Lemmon	Mount Lemmon Survey	·	780 m	MPC · JPL
490018	2008 SF_{265}	—	September 26, 2008	Kitt Peak	Spacewatch	V	560 m	MPC · JPL
490019	2008 SN_{267}	—	September 23, 2008	Kitt Peak	Spacewatch	(5)	920 m	MPC · JPL
490020	2008 SE_{270}	—	September 23, 2008	Kitt Peak	Spacewatch	·	720 m	MPC · JPL
490021	2008 SJ_{270}	—	September 24, 2008	Kitt Peak	Spacewatch	·	2.6 km	MPC · JPL
490022	2008 SK_{270}	—	September 24, 2008	Mount Lemmon	Mount Lemmon Survey	·	2.7 km	MPC · JPL
490023	2008 SS_{277}	—	September 25, 2008	Kitt Peak	Spacewatch	·	890 m	MPC · JPL
490024	2008 SN_{281}	—	September 22, 2008	Mount Lemmon	Mount Lemmon Survey	KOR	1.4 km	MPC · JPL
490025	2008 SA_{283}	—	September 20, 2008	Kitt Peak	Spacewatch	EOS	1.9 km	MPC · JPL
490026	2008 SH_{288}	—	September 23, 2008	Kitt Peak	Spacewatch	·	1.4 km	MPC · JPL
490027	2008 SG_{290}	—	September 29, 2008	Catalina	CSS	·	3.0 km	MPC · JPL
490028	2008 SS_{299}	—	September 22, 2008	Kitt Peak	Spacewatch	·	960 m	MPC · JPL
490029	2008 SH_{302}	—	September 23, 2008	Kitt Peak	Spacewatch	·	2.8 km	MPC · JPL
490030	2008 ST_{304}	—	September 25, 2008	Kitt Peak	Spacewatch	·	2.4 km	MPC · JPL
490031	2008 TT_{3}	—	October 6, 2008	Catalina	CSS	H	400 m	MPC · JPL
490032	2008 TQ_{4}	—	October 3, 2008	Mount Lemmon	Mount Lemmon Survey	·	2.7 km	MPC · JPL
490033	2008 TB_{7}	—	September 4, 2008	Kitt Peak	Spacewatch	·	700 m	MPC · JPL
490034	2008 TO_{16}	—	September 23, 2008	Kitt Peak	Spacewatch	EOS	1.3 km	MPC · JPL
490035	2008 TP_{16}	—	September 5, 2008	Kitt Peak	Spacewatch	(2076)	740 m	MPC · JPL
490036	2008 TV_{16}	—	September 23, 2008	Kitt Peak	Spacewatch	L4	5.7 km	MPC · JPL
490037	2008 TE_{18}	—	October 1, 2008	Mount Lemmon	Mount Lemmon Survey	NEM	1.7 km	MPC · JPL
490038	2008 TY_{19}	—	September 6, 2008	Mount Lemmon	Mount Lemmon Survey	·	800 m	MPC · JPL
490039	2008 TO_{20}	—	October 1, 2008	Mount Lemmon	Mount Lemmon Survey	·	1.4 km	MPC · JPL
490040	2008 TB_{22}	—	October 1, 2008	Mount Lemmon	Mount Lemmon Survey	·	590 m	MPC · JPL
490041	2008 TH_{30}	—	October 1, 2008	Kitt Peak	Spacewatch	·	670 m	MPC · JPL
490042	2008 TM_{36}	—	September 2, 2008	Kitt Peak	Spacewatch	AGN	1.1 km	MPC · JPL
490043	2008 TK_{41}	—	September 24, 2008	Mount Lemmon	Mount Lemmon Survey	·	990 m	MPC · JPL
490044	2008 TR_{51}	—	September 24, 2008	Kitt Peak	Spacewatch	EOS	2.0 km	MPC · JPL
490045	2008 TS_{51}	—	October 2, 2008	Kitt Peak	Spacewatch	·	600 m	MPC · JPL
490046	2008 TQ_{61}	—	October 2, 2008	Kitt Peak	Spacewatch	·	1.4 km	MPC · JPL
490047	2008 TX_{61}	—	October 2, 2008	Kitt Peak	Spacewatch	MAS	550 m	MPC · JPL
490048	2008 TH_{65}	—	October 2, 2008	Catalina	CSS	·	780 m	MPC · JPL
490049	2008 TN_{71}	—	October 2, 2008	Kitt Peak	Spacewatch	·	720 m	MPC · JPL
490050	2008 TQ_{73}	—	September 23, 2008	Mount Lemmon	Mount Lemmon Survey	·	2.8 km	MPC · JPL
490051	2008 TW_{74}	—	September 22, 2008	Mount Lemmon	Mount Lemmon Survey	·	3.2 km	MPC · JPL
490052	2008 TY_{74}	—	September 7, 2008	Mount Lemmon	Mount Lemmon Survey	·	1.1 km	MPC · JPL
490053	2008 TL_{75}	—	October 2, 2008	Kitt Peak	Spacewatch	·	2.9 km	MPC · JPL
490054	2008 TH_{80}	—	March 23, 2006	Kitt Peak	Spacewatch	·	2.3 km	MPC · JPL
490055	2008 TQ_{84}	—	September 6, 2008	Mount Lemmon	Mount Lemmon Survey	·	750 m	MPC · JPL
490056	2008 TB_{86}	—	September 2, 2008	Kitt Peak	Spacewatch	·	680 m	MPC · JPL
490057	2008 TF_{86}	—	September 2, 2008	Kitt Peak	Spacewatch	·	670 m	MPC · JPL
490058	2008 TG_{86}	—	October 3, 2008	Mount Lemmon	Mount Lemmon Survey	·	3.2 km	MPC · JPL
490059	2008 TQ_{88}	—	September 23, 2008	Kitt Peak	Spacewatch	·	860 m	MPC · JPL
490060	2008 TC_{90}	—	September 26, 1998	Kitt Peak	Spacewatch	·	1.4 km	MPC · JPL
490061	2008 TT_{96}	—	September 25, 2008	Kitt Peak	Spacewatch	·	2.4 km	MPC · JPL
490062	2008 TL_{97}	—	September 5, 2008	Kitt Peak	Spacewatch	·	2.6 km	MPC · JPL
490063	2008 TX_{99}	—	September 24, 2008	Kitt Peak	Spacewatch	·	440 m	MPC · JPL
490064	2008 TZ_{100}	—	September 24, 2008	Kitt Peak	Spacewatch	·	780 m	MPC · JPL
490065	2008 TO_{102}	—	October 6, 2008	Kitt Peak	Spacewatch	·	570 m	MPC · JPL
490066	2008 TN_{103}	—	October 6, 2008	Catalina	CSS	·	1.9 km	MPC · JPL
490067	2008 TF_{104}	—	September 22, 2008	Kitt Peak	Spacewatch	·	3.1 km	MPC · JPL
490068	2008 TE_{113}	—	October 6, 2008	Kitt Peak	Spacewatch	·	560 m	MPC · JPL
490069	2008 TA_{114}	—	October 2, 2008	Kitt Peak	Spacewatch	·	1.7 km	MPC · JPL
490070	2008 TM_{116}	—	September 22, 2008	Kitt Peak	Spacewatch	·	760 m	MPC · JPL
490071	2008 TQ_{117}	—	October 6, 2008	Kitt Peak	Spacewatch	NYS	760 m	MPC · JPL
490072	2008 TU_{119}	—	September 21, 2008	Kitt Peak	Spacewatch	·	610 m	MPC · JPL
490073	2008 TX_{121}	—	October 7, 2008	Catalina	CSS	·	1.2 km	MPC · JPL
490074	2008 TC_{124}	—	September 4, 2008	Kitt Peak	Spacewatch	ERI	840 m	MPC · JPL
490075	2008 TD_{131}	—	September 6, 2008	Mount Lemmon	Mount Lemmon Survey	PHO	880 m	MPC · JPL
490076	2008 TM_{135}	—	September 26, 2008	Kitt Peak	Spacewatch	·	1.5 km	MPC · JPL
490077	2008 TR_{145}	—	October 9, 2008	Mount Lemmon	Mount Lemmon Survey	·	590 m	MPC · JPL
490078	2008 TG_{146}	—	September 2, 2008	Kitt Peak	Spacewatch	(5)	830 m	MPC · JPL
490079	2008 TO_{147}	—	September 23, 2008	Mount Lemmon	Mount Lemmon Survey	·	660 m	MPC · JPL
490080	2008 TL_{150}	—	October 9, 2008	Mount Lemmon	Mount Lemmon Survey	·	1.6 km	MPC · JPL
490081	2008 TX_{150}	—	September 28, 2008	Mount Lemmon	Mount Lemmon Survey	·	580 m	MPC · JPL
490082	2008 TC_{161}	—	October 1, 2008	Mount Lemmon	Mount Lemmon Survey	ERI	1.2 km	MPC · JPL
490083	2008 TV_{163}	—	October 1, 2008	Kitt Peak	Spacewatch	·	600 m	MPC · JPL
490084	2008 TP_{166}	—	October 7, 2008	Kitt Peak	Spacewatch	KOR	1.3 km	MPC · JPL
490085	2008 TC_{168}	—	October 1, 2008	Kitt Peak	Spacewatch	·	640 m	MPC · JPL
490086	2008 TF_{173}	—	October 2, 2008	Kitt Peak	Spacewatch	·	2.1 km	MPC · JPL
490087	2008 TP_{177}	—	October 1, 2008	Catalina	CSS	·	3.7 km	MPC · JPL
490088	2008 TD_{184}	—	October 6, 2008	La Sagra	OAM	·	2.1 km	MPC · JPL
490089	2008 TE_{184}	—	October 6, 2008	Kitt Peak	Spacewatch	EOS	1.6 km	MPC · JPL
490090	2008 UN	—	October 9, 2008	Kitt Peak	Spacewatch	·	1.4 km	MPC · JPL
490091	2008 US_{8}	—	October 17, 2008	Kitt Peak	Spacewatch	H	330 m	MPC · JPL
490092	2008 UJ_{11}	—	October 3, 2008	Mount Lemmon	Mount Lemmon Survey	·	2.6 km	MPC · JPL
490093	2008 UG_{22}	—	September 20, 2008	Kitt Peak	Spacewatch	·	740 m	MPC · JPL
490094	2008 UX_{22}	—	October 7, 2008	Kitt Peak	Spacewatch	·	860 m	MPC · JPL
490095	2008 UN_{23}	—	September 20, 2008	Mount Lemmon	Mount Lemmon Survey	KOR	1.2 km	MPC · JPL
490096	2008 UT_{24}	—	September 25, 2008	Kitt Peak	Spacewatch	NYS	860 m	MPC · JPL
490097	2008 UW_{26}	—	October 20, 2008	Kitt Peak	Spacewatch	·	3.1 km	MPC · JPL
490098	2008 UL_{27}	—	September 29, 2008	Kitt Peak	Spacewatch	MRX	860 m	MPC · JPL
490099	2008 UT_{27}	—	October 20, 2008	Kitt Peak	Spacewatch	·	980 m	MPC · JPL
490100	2008 UR_{28}	—	October 20, 2008	Kitt Peak	Spacewatch	·	1.8 km	MPC · JPL

== 490101–490200 ==
back to top

Designation			Discovery			Properties		Ref
Permanent	Provisional	Named after	Date	Site	Discoverer(s)	Category	Diam.	Ref
490101	2008 UV_{29}	—	September 29, 2008	Catalina	CSS	H	480 m	MPC · JPL
490102	2008 UW_{30}	—	October 20, 2008	Kitt Peak	Spacewatch	·	650 m	MPC · JPL
490103	2008 UD_{32}	—	October 20, 2008	Kitt Peak	Spacewatch	·	3.7 km	MPC · JPL
490104	2008 UQ_{35}	—	October 1, 2008	Kitt Peak	Spacewatch	KOR	1.2 km	MPC · JPL
490105	2008 UH_{36}	—	October 20, 2008	Kitt Peak	Spacewatch	·	1.4 km	MPC · JPL
490106	2008 UM_{36}	—	October 20, 2008	Kitt Peak	Spacewatch	·	1.1 km	MPC · JPL
490107	2008 UQ_{38}	—	October 20, 2008	Kitt Peak	Spacewatch	·	1.3 km	MPC · JPL
490108	2008 UR_{41}	—	September 22, 2008	Mount Lemmon	Mount Lemmon Survey	·	1.0 km	MPC · JPL
490109	2008 UW_{41}	—	October 20, 2008	Kitt Peak	Spacewatch	CYB	3.3 km	MPC · JPL
490110	2008 UA_{42}	—	September 25, 2008	Mount Lemmon	Mount Lemmon Survey	·	1.5 km	MPC · JPL
490111	2008 UY_{43}	—	September 21, 2008	Kitt Peak	Spacewatch	·	860 m	MPC · JPL
490112	2008 UD_{49}	—	September 22, 2008	Mount Lemmon	Mount Lemmon Survey	·	760 m	MPC · JPL
490113	2008 UM_{49}	—	September 26, 2008	Kitt Peak	Spacewatch	·	970 m	MPC · JPL
490114	2008 UL_{50}	—	October 20, 2008	Mount Lemmon	Mount Lemmon Survey	MAS	580 m	MPC · JPL
490115	2008 UH_{52}	—	October 3, 2008	Mount Lemmon	Mount Lemmon Survey	·	1.9 km	MPC · JPL
490116	2008 UE_{67}	—	October 21, 2008	Kitt Peak	Spacewatch	(5)	1.1 km	MPC · JPL
490117	2008 UB_{72}	—	October 21, 2008	Kitt Peak	Spacewatch	·	1.7 km	MPC · JPL
490118	2008 UJ_{75}	—	October 21, 2008	Kitt Peak	Spacewatch	·	1.1 km	MPC · JPL
490119	2008 UN_{75}	—	October 21, 2008	Kitt Peak	Spacewatch	·	670 m	MPC · JPL
490120	2008 UK_{77}	—	October 21, 2008	Kitt Peak	Spacewatch	AGN	1.1 km	MPC · JPL
490121	2008 UZ_{79}	—	October 22, 2008	Kitt Peak	Spacewatch	·	1.7 km	MPC · JPL
490122	2008 UY_{80}	—	September 22, 2008	Kitt Peak	Spacewatch	MAS	600 m	MPC · JPL
490123	2008 UB_{87}	—	October 23, 2008	Mount Lemmon	Mount Lemmon Survey	·	870 m	MPC · JPL
490124	2008 UE_{87}	—	September 29, 2008	Kitt Peak	Spacewatch	·	800 m	MPC · JPL
490125	2008 UM_{87}	—	October 23, 2008	Kitt Peak	Spacewatch	·	900 m	MPC · JPL
490126	2008 UZ_{93}	—	September 6, 2008	Catalina	CSS	·	1.7 km	MPC · JPL
490127	2008 UN_{101}	—	March 14, 2007	Kitt Peak	Spacewatch	·	760 m	MPC · JPL
490128	2008 UB_{102}	—	October 9, 2008	Kitt Peak	Spacewatch	·	500 m	MPC · JPL
490129	2008 UZ_{104}	—	October 20, 2008	Mount Lemmon	Mount Lemmon Survey	KOR	1.1 km	MPC · JPL
490130	2008 UO_{108}	—	October 21, 2008	Kitt Peak	Spacewatch	(5)	1.1 km	MPC · JPL
490131	2008 UM_{119}	—	October 22, 2008	Kitt Peak	Spacewatch	·	720 m	MPC · JPL
490132	2008 UT_{120}	—	October 22, 2008	Kitt Peak	Spacewatch	·	1.3 km	MPC · JPL
490133	2008 UA_{123}	—	October 22, 2008	Kitt Peak	Spacewatch	·	1.4 km	MPC · JPL
490134	2008 UW_{124}	—	October 22, 2008	Kitt Peak	Spacewatch	V	580 m	MPC · JPL
490135	2008 UY_{124}	—	October 22, 2008	Kitt Peak	Spacewatch	·	1.6 km	MPC · JPL
490136	2008 UE_{128}	—	October 22, 2008	Kitt Peak	Spacewatch	·	1.5 km	MPC · JPL
490137	2008 UZ_{132}	—	October 23, 2008	Kitt Peak	Spacewatch	·	1.5 km	MPC · JPL
490138	2008 UM_{139}	—	September 6, 2008	Mount Lemmon	Mount Lemmon Survey	MAS	640 m	MPC · JPL
490139	2008 UQ_{143}	—	September 22, 2008	Mount Lemmon	Mount Lemmon Survey	·	1.0 km	MPC · JPL
490140	2008 UA_{145}	—	October 23, 2008	Kitt Peak	Spacewatch	·	1.1 km	MPC · JPL
490141	2008 UX_{146}	—	September 22, 2008	Mount Lemmon	Mount Lemmon Survey	·	1.2 km	MPC · JPL
490142	2008 UY_{150}	—	October 23, 2008	Mount Lemmon	Mount Lemmon Survey	·	1.9 km	MPC · JPL
490143	2008 UZ_{150}	—	September 22, 2008	Mount Lemmon	Mount Lemmon Survey	AEO	1.1 km	MPC · JPL
490144	2008 UX_{154}	—	October 23, 2008	Mount Lemmon	Mount Lemmon Survey	·	2.4 km	MPC · JPL
490145	2008 UY_{156}	—	October 23, 2008	Mount Lemmon	Mount Lemmon Survey	MAS	540 m	MPC · JPL
490146	2008 UW_{157}	—	September 24, 2008	Mount Lemmon	Mount Lemmon Survey	·	1.5 km	MPC · JPL
490147	2008 UZ_{158}	—	October 23, 2008	Kitt Peak	Spacewatch	·	760 m	MPC · JPL
490148	2008 UA_{159}	—	October 23, 2008	Kitt Peak	Spacewatch	·	1.3 km	MPC · JPL
490149	2008 UM_{165}	—	October 24, 2008	Kitt Peak	Spacewatch	·	1.5 km	MPC · JPL
490150	2008 UD_{175}	—	October 24, 2008	Kitt Peak	Spacewatch	·	800 m	MPC · JPL
490151	2008 UW_{178}	—	October 4, 2008	La Sagra	OAM	MAR	1.1 km	MPC · JPL
490152	2008 UM_{184}	—	October 24, 2008	Kitt Peak	Spacewatch	MAS	550 m	MPC · JPL
490153	2008 UJ_{196}	—	October 27, 2008	Kitt Peak	Spacewatch	·	1.3 km	MPC · JPL
490154	2008 UO_{196}	—	September 6, 2008	Mount Lemmon	Mount Lemmon Survey	·	700 m	MPC · JPL
490155	2008 UP_{198}	—	October 2, 2008	Kitt Peak	Spacewatch	·	3.7 km	MPC · JPL
490156	2008 UV_{199}	—	September 6, 2008	Mount Lemmon	Mount Lemmon Survey	·	900 m	MPC · JPL
490157	2008 UY_{201}	—	September 24, 2008	Mount Lemmon	Mount Lemmon Survey	·	1.3 km	MPC · JPL
490158	2008 UB_{203}	—	October 28, 2008	Socorro	LINEAR	·	1.5 km	MPC · JPL
490159	2008 UE_{222}	—	October 25, 2008	Kitt Peak	Spacewatch	·	1.0 km	MPC · JPL
490160	2008 UN_{229}	—	October 25, 2008	Kitt Peak	Spacewatch	·	1.2 km	MPC · JPL
490161	2008 UZ_{230}	—	September 5, 2008	Kitt Peak	Spacewatch	·	2.1 km	MPC · JPL
490162	2008 UN_{236}	—	September 29, 2008	Mount Lemmon	Mount Lemmon Survey	·	1.1 km	MPC · JPL
490163	2008 UW_{240}	—	October 26, 2008	Kitt Peak	Spacewatch	·	2.9 km	MPC · JPL
490164	2008 UN_{243}	—	October 22, 2008	Kitt Peak	Spacewatch	·	1.0 km	MPC · JPL
490165	2008 UP_{245}	—	October 26, 2008	Kitt Peak	Spacewatch	(5)	950 m	MPC · JPL
490166	2008 UZ_{247}	—	October 26, 2008	Kitt Peak	Spacewatch	·	790 m	MPC · JPL
490167	2008 UP_{248}	—	October 26, 2008	Kitt Peak	Spacewatch	·	1.1 km	MPC · JPL
490168	2008 UG_{250}	—	October 8, 2008	Kitt Peak	Spacewatch	·	2.5 km	MPC · JPL
490169	2008 UP_{250}	—	October 27, 2008	Kitt Peak	Spacewatch	·	580 m	MPC · JPL
490170	2008 UD_{252}	—	October 27, 2008	Kitt Peak	Spacewatch	·	1.7 km	MPC · JPL
490171	2008 UD_{253}	—	October 27, 2008	Mount Lemmon	Mount Lemmon Survey	T_{j} (2.72)	6.3 km	MPC · JPL
490172	2008 UJ_{253}	—	September 6, 2008	Mount Lemmon	Mount Lemmon Survey	·	1.4 km	MPC · JPL
490173	2008 UO_{255}	—	September 21, 2008	Catalina	CSS	·	860 m	MPC · JPL
490174	2008 UR_{256}	—	October 27, 2008	Kitt Peak	Spacewatch	·	2.8 km	MPC · JPL
490175	2008 UB_{259}	—	October 27, 2008	Kitt Peak	Spacewatch	AGN	1.2 km	MPC · JPL
490176	2008 UT_{260}	—	October 27, 2008	Mount Lemmon	Mount Lemmon Survey	·	490 m	MPC · JPL
490177	2008 UV_{269}	—	September 24, 2008	Mount Lemmon	Mount Lemmon Survey	·	690 m	MPC · JPL
490178	2008 UO_{272}	—	October 28, 2008	Mount Lemmon	Mount Lemmon Survey	·	2.8 km	MPC · JPL
490179	2008 UW_{272}	—	October 28, 2008	Kitt Peak	Spacewatch	·	760 m	MPC · JPL
490180	2008 UJ_{275}	—	October 28, 2008	Kitt Peak	Spacewatch	·	2.3 km	MPC · JPL
490181	2008 UN_{277}	—	October 28, 2008	Mount Lemmon	Mount Lemmon Survey	·	980 m	MPC · JPL
490182	2008 UF_{283}	—	April 14, 2007	Kitt Peak	Spacewatch	·	660 m	MPC · JPL
490183	2008 UL_{283}	—	September 29, 2008	Kitt Peak	Spacewatch	·	1.5 km	MPC · JPL
490184	2008 UD_{285}	—	October 7, 2008	Kitt Peak	Spacewatch	DOR	2.5 km	MPC · JPL
490185	2008 US_{289}	—	October 28, 2008	Kitt Peak	Spacewatch	NYS	980 m	MPC · JPL
490186	2008 UZ_{299}	—	February 24, 2006	Kitt Peak	Spacewatch	·	700 m	MPC · JPL
490187	2008 UW_{302}	—	October 21, 2008	Kitt Peak	Spacewatch	·	790 m	MPC · JPL
490188	2008 UT_{303}	—	October 29, 2008	Kitt Peak	Spacewatch	·	1.4 km	MPC · JPL
490189	2008 UJ_{305}	—	September 2, 2008	Kitt Peak	Spacewatch	·	1.6 km	MPC · JPL
490190	2008 UD_{309}	—	September 6, 2008	Mount Lemmon	Mount Lemmon Survey	·	700 m	MPC · JPL
490191	2008 UR_{314}	—	October 20, 2008	Kitt Peak	Spacewatch	·	430 m	MPC · JPL
490192	2008 UC_{315}	—	October 30, 2008	Kitt Peak	Spacewatch	·	2.1 km	MPC · JPL
490193	2008 UP_{317}	—	September 20, 2008	Mount Lemmon	Mount Lemmon Survey	critical	960 m	MPC · JPL
490194	2008 UJ_{321}	—	September 22, 2008	Mount Lemmon	Mount Lemmon Survey	·	740 m	MPC · JPL
490195	2008 UT_{324}	—	September 23, 2008	Kitt Peak	Spacewatch	·	600 m	MPC · JPL
490196	2008 UH_{327}	—	September 5, 2008	Socorro	LINEAR	H	470 m	MPC · JPL
490197	2008 UT_{328}	—	October 30, 2008	Kitt Peak	Spacewatch	·	980 m	MPC · JPL
490198	2008 UC_{331}	—	October 31, 2008	Mount Lemmon	Mount Lemmon Survey	·	1.8 km	MPC · JPL
490199	2008 UH_{337}	—	October 21, 2008	Kitt Peak	Spacewatch	·	970 m	MPC · JPL
490200	2008 US_{339}	—	October 2, 1995	Kitt Peak	Spacewatch	·	1.0 km	MPC · JPL

== 490201–490300 ==
back to top

Designation			Discovery			Properties		Ref
Permanent	Provisional	Named after	Date	Site	Discoverer(s)	Category	Diam.	Ref
490201	2008 UQ_{352}	—	October 21, 2008	Mount Lemmon	Mount Lemmon Survey	·	1.7 km	MPC · JPL
490202	2008 UC_{353}	—	October 24, 2008	Kitt Peak	Spacewatch	·	1.5 km	MPC · JPL
490203	2008 UX_{353}	—	October 21, 2008	Kitt Peak	Spacewatch	·	1.1 km	MPC · JPL
490204	2008 UV_{354}	—	October 28, 2008	Kitt Peak	Spacewatch	·	3.4 km	MPC · JPL
490205	2008 UO_{355}	—	October 24, 2008	Kitt Peak	Spacewatch	·	990 m	MPC · JPL
490206	2008 UW_{356}	—	October 23, 2008	Kitt Peak	Spacewatch	·	3.1 km	MPC · JPL
490207	2008 UN_{359}	—	October 28, 2008	Kitt Peak	Spacewatch	MAS	490 m	MPC · JPL
490208	2008 UW_{359}	—	October 28, 2008	Kitt Peak	Spacewatch	·	1.4 km	MPC · JPL
490209	2008 UE_{361}	—	October 25, 2008	Catalina	CSS	·	1.8 km	MPC · JPL
490210	2008 UD_{366}	—	October 19, 2008	Kitt Peak	Spacewatch	V	610 m	MPC · JPL
490211	2008 UQ_{368}	—	October 25, 2008	Mount Lemmon	Mount Lemmon Survey	PHO	900 m	MPC · JPL
490212	2008 VP	—	October 26, 2008	Kitt Peak	Spacewatch	(5)	890 m	MPC · JPL
490213	2008 VZ_{1}	—	October 22, 2008	Kitt Peak	Spacewatch	·	810 m	MPC · JPL
490214	2008 VF_{4}	—	October 21, 2008	Kitt Peak	Spacewatch	·	1.2 km	MPC · JPL
490215	2008 VJ_{5}	—	October 6, 2008	Kitt Peak	Spacewatch	·	880 m	MPC · JPL
490216	2008 VV_{10}	—	September 22, 2008	Mount Lemmon	Mount Lemmon Survey	·	960 m	MPC · JPL
490217	2008 VJ_{12}	—	October 10, 2008	Mount Lemmon	Mount Lemmon Survey	·	2.4 km	MPC · JPL
490218	2008 VS_{13}	—	November 7, 2008	Andrushivka	Andrushivka	PHO	2.3 km	MPC · JPL
490219	2008 VN_{19}	—	October 7, 2008	Mount Lemmon	Mount Lemmon Survey	·	910 m	MPC · JPL
490220	2008 VK_{32}	—	November 2, 2008	Mount Lemmon	Mount Lemmon Survey	·	970 m	MPC · JPL
490221	2008 VU_{33}	—	April 30, 2006	Kitt Peak	Spacewatch	·	2.8 km	MPC · JPL
490222	2008 VC_{44}	—	October 22, 2008	Kitt Peak	Spacewatch	CYB	3.4 km	MPC · JPL
490223	2008 VM_{53}	—	September 22, 2008	Mount Lemmon	Mount Lemmon Survey	·	740 m	MPC · JPL
490224	2008 VV_{53}	—	November 6, 2008	Mount Lemmon	Mount Lemmon Survey	L4	5.6 km	MPC · JPL
490225	2008 VC_{54}	—	October 26, 2008	Kitt Peak	Spacewatch	(5)	1 km	MPC · JPL
490226	2008 VH_{54}	—	November 6, 2008	Kitt Peak	Spacewatch	·	1.7 km	MPC · JPL
490227	2008 VR_{62}	—	October 2, 2008	Mount Lemmon	Mount Lemmon Survey	·	2.4 km	MPC · JPL
490228	2008 VS_{69}	—	October 27, 2008	Kitt Peak	Spacewatch	·	1.8 km	MPC · JPL
490229	2008 VN_{79}	—	November 7, 2008	Mount Lemmon	Mount Lemmon Survey	·	3.2 km	MPC · JPL
490230	2008 WK_{2}	—	September 27, 2008	Mount Lemmon	Mount Lemmon Survey	·	2.4 km	MPC · JPL
490231	2008 WD_{5}	—	October 7, 2008	Kitt Peak	Spacewatch	·	2.0 km	MPC · JPL
490232	2008 WS_{15}	—	September 6, 2008	Mount Lemmon	Mount Lemmon Survey	NYS	670 m	MPC · JPL
490233	2008 WG_{17}	—	October 10, 2008	Mount Lemmon	Mount Lemmon Survey	·	3.2 km	MPC · JPL
490234	2008 WK_{25}	—	November 7, 2008	Mount Lemmon	Mount Lemmon Survey	(5)	1.1 km	MPC · JPL
490235	2008 WX_{34}	—	November 8, 2008	Mount Lemmon	Mount Lemmon Survey	·	1.3 km	MPC · JPL
490236	2008 WJ_{36}	—	October 24, 2008	Kitt Peak	Spacewatch	VER	2.3 km	MPC · JPL
490237	2008 WO_{38}	—	November 17, 2008	Kitt Peak	Spacewatch	·	800 m	MPC · JPL
490238	2008 WN_{39}	—	October 23, 2008	Mount Lemmon	Mount Lemmon Survey	NYS	1.1 km	MPC · JPL
490239	2008 WV_{44}	—	October 26, 2008	Kitt Peak	Spacewatch	MAS	570 m	MPC · JPL
490240	2008 WH_{46}	—	November 17, 2008	Kitt Peak	Spacewatch	·	950 m	MPC · JPL
490241	2008 WA_{47}	—	November 17, 2008	Kitt Peak	Spacewatch	·	940 m	MPC · JPL
490242	2008 WN_{53}	—	November 19, 2008	Kitt Peak	Spacewatch	·	650 m	MPC · JPL
490243	2008 WR_{59}	—	November 1, 2008	Mount Lemmon	Mount Lemmon Survey	NYS	1.0 km	MPC · JPL
490244	2008 WH_{66}	—	October 29, 2008	Kitt Peak	Spacewatch	·	1.1 km	MPC · JPL
490245	2008 WB_{73}	—	November 19, 2008	Mount Lemmon	Mount Lemmon Survey	·	840 m	MPC · JPL
490246	2008 WF_{81}	—	November 20, 2008	Kitt Peak	Spacewatch	·	850 m	MPC · JPL
490247	2008 WK_{85}	—	November 20, 2008	Kitt Peak	Spacewatch	·	1.0 km	MPC · JPL
490248	2008 WV_{86}	—	October 23, 2008	Kitt Peak	Spacewatch	·	810 m	MPC · JPL
490249	2008 WB_{92}	—	November 7, 2008	Mount Lemmon	Mount Lemmon Survey	·	650 m	MPC · JPL
490250	2008 WS_{95}	—	October 8, 2008	Mount Lemmon	Mount Lemmon Survey	·	860 m	MPC · JPL
490251	2008 WY_{103}	—	November 30, 2008	Catalina	CSS	·	4.8 km	MPC · JPL
490252	2008 WH_{107}	—	September 23, 2008	Mount Lemmon	Mount Lemmon Survey	·	860 m	MPC · JPL
490253	2008 WW_{110}	—	November 21, 2008	Kitt Peak	Spacewatch	·	3.0 km	MPC · JPL
490254	2008 WC_{114}	—	November 17, 2008	Kitt Peak	Spacewatch	·	1.5 km	MPC · JPL
490255	2008 WC_{120}	—	November 30, 2008	Kitt Peak	Spacewatch	MAS	800 m	MPC · JPL
490256	2008 WY_{137}	—	October 10, 2008	Mount Lemmon	Mount Lemmon Survey	H	600 m	MPC · JPL
490257	2008 WQ_{138}	—	November 19, 2008	Mount Lemmon	Mount Lemmon Survey	PHO	1.1 km	MPC · JPL
490258	2008 WE_{141}	—	November 21, 2008	Mount Lemmon	Mount Lemmon Survey	·	2.0 km	MPC · JPL
490259	2008 XB_{12}	—	September 29, 2008	Mount Lemmon	Mount Lemmon Survey	·	940 m	MPC · JPL
490260	2008 XA_{14}	—	October 21, 2008	Kitt Peak	Spacewatch	·	1 km	MPC · JPL
490261	2008 XR_{18}	—	November 19, 2008	Kitt Peak	Spacewatch	MAS	600 m	MPC · JPL
490262	2008 XA_{38}	—	November 20, 2008	Kitt Peak	Spacewatch	·	910 m	MPC · JPL
490263	2008 XF_{39}	—	December 2, 2008	Kitt Peak	Spacewatch	·	1.2 km	MPC · JPL
490264	2008 YS_{10}	—	November 30, 2008	Mount Lemmon	Mount Lemmon Survey	·	1.1 km	MPC · JPL
490265	2008 YP_{11}	—	November 30, 2008	Kitt Peak	Spacewatch	·	1.0 km	MPC · JPL
490266	2008 YT_{12}	—	November 6, 2008	Mount Lemmon	Mount Lemmon Survey	·	810 m	MPC · JPL
490267	2008 YX_{15}	—	November 20, 2008	Mount Lemmon	Mount Lemmon Survey	NYS	970 m	MPC · JPL
490268	2008 YM_{17}	—	December 21, 2008	Mount Lemmon	Mount Lemmon Survey	MAS	700 m	MPC · JPL
490269	2008 YP_{17}	—	December 21, 2008	Mount Lemmon	Mount Lemmon Survey	·	1.6 km	MPC · JPL
490270	2008 YH_{36}	—	November 24, 2008	Mount Lemmon	Mount Lemmon Survey	·	1.2 km	MPC · JPL
490271	2008 YR_{42}	—	December 29, 2008	Kitt Peak	Spacewatch	·	1.4 km	MPC · JPL
490272	2008 YY_{42}	—	November 19, 2008	Mount Lemmon	Mount Lemmon Survey	·	1.1 km	MPC · JPL
490273	2008 YC_{48}	—	December 29, 2008	Mount Lemmon	Mount Lemmon Survey	·	1.0 km	MPC · JPL
490274	2008 YJ_{48}	—	November 21, 2008	Mount Lemmon	Mount Lemmon Survey	·	1.3 km	MPC · JPL
490275	2008 YT_{48}	—	December 29, 2008	Mount Lemmon	Mount Lemmon Survey	·	1.3 km	MPC · JPL
490276	2008 YU_{48}	—	December 29, 2008	Mount Lemmon	Mount Lemmon Survey	·	1.1 km	MPC · JPL
490277	2008 YG_{51}	—	December 29, 2008	Mount Lemmon	Mount Lemmon Survey	·	1.0 km	MPC · JPL
490278	2008 YB_{56}	—	November 6, 2008	Mount Lemmon	Mount Lemmon Survey	·	1.1 km	MPC · JPL
490279	2008 YW_{74}	—	December 30, 2008	Kitt Peak	Spacewatch	·	1.5 km	MPC · JPL
490280	2008 YL_{83}	—	November 19, 2008	Mount Lemmon	Mount Lemmon Survey	NYS	1.1 km	MPC · JPL
490281	2008 YU_{100}	—	December 29, 2008	Kitt Peak	Spacewatch	MAS	650 m	MPC · JPL
490282	2008 YK_{102}	—	December 29, 2008	Kitt Peak	Spacewatch	·	910 m	MPC · JPL
490283	2008 YJ_{104}	—	December 22, 2008	Kitt Peak	Spacewatch	·	1.0 km	MPC · JPL
490284	2008 YS_{105}	—	December 21, 2008	Mount Lemmon	Mount Lemmon Survey	·	790 m	MPC · JPL
490285	2008 YD_{113}	—	December 21, 2008	Kitt Peak	Spacewatch	·	1.4 km	MPC · JPL
490286	2008 YL_{117}	—	November 8, 2008	Mount Lemmon	Mount Lemmon Survey	·	1.1 km	MPC · JPL
490287	2008 YX_{117}	—	December 29, 2008	Mount Lemmon	Mount Lemmon Survey	·	800 m	MPC · JPL
490288	2008 YC_{124}	—	December 30, 2008	Kitt Peak	Spacewatch	·	1.4 km	MPC · JPL
490289	2008 YS_{125}	—	December 30, 2008	Kitt Peak	Spacewatch	V	620 m	MPC · JPL
490290	2008 YM_{126}	—	December 22, 2008	Kitt Peak	Spacewatch	·	1.1 km	MPC · JPL
490291	2008 YY_{126}	—	December 30, 2008	Kitt Peak	Spacewatch	·	1.1 km	MPC · JPL
490292	2008 YD_{132}	—	December 31, 2008	Kitt Peak	Spacewatch	·	1.2 km	MPC · JPL
490293	2008 YR_{135}	—	December 22, 2008	Kitt Peak	Spacewatch	·	1.3 km	MPC · JPL
490294	2008 YZ_{135}	—	December 2, 2008	Kitt Peak	Spacewatch	·	1.5 km	MPC · JPL
490295	2008 YC_{140}	—	December 22, 2008	Kitt Peak	Spacewatch	NYS	950 m	MPC · JPL
490296	2008 YY_{143}	—	December 22, 2008	Mount Lemmon	Mount Lemmon Survey	·	1.0 km	MPC · JPL
490297	2008 YR_{160}	—	December 30, 2008	Mount Lemmon	Mount Lemmon Survey	EOS	2.4 km	MPC · JPL
490298	2008 YM_{170}	—	December 29, 2008	Kitt Peak	Spacewatch	·	970 m	MPC · JPL
490299	2009 AK_{9}	—	December 5, 2008	Mount Lemmon	Mount Lemmon Survey	·	1.4 km	MPC · JPL
490300	2009 AX_{11}	—	December 22, 2008	Kitt Peak	Spacewatch	·	1.0 km	MPC · JPL

== 490301–490400 ==
back to top

Designation			Discovery			Properties		Ref
Permanent	Provisional	Named after	Date	Site	Discoverer(s)	Category	Diam.	Ref
490301	2009 AJ_{15}	—	November 30, 2008	Catalina	CSS	·	1.4 km	MPC · JPL
490302	2009 AG_{23}	—	November 24, 2008	Mount Lemmon	Mount Lemmon Survey	·	1.3 km	MPC · JPL
490303	2009 AY_{24}	—	January 3, 2009	Kitt Peak	Spacewatch	·	1.6 km	MPC · JPL
490304	2009 AY_{25}	—	January 2, 2009	Kitt Peak	Spacewatch	MAS	590 m	MPC · JPL
490305	2009 BK_{22}	—	January 1, 2009	Mount Lemmon	Mount Lemmon Survey	·	1.3 km	MPC · JPL
490306	2009 BL_{30}	—	December 29, 2008	Kitt Peak	Spacewatch	·	1.0 km	MPC · JPL
490307	2009 BH_{33}	—	January 16, 2009	Kitt Peak	Spacewatch	EOS	1.5 km	MPC · JPL
490308	2009 BE_{38}	—	January 16, 2009	Kitt Peak	Spacewatch	·	1.8 km	MPC · JPL
490309	2009 BH_{38}	—	January 16, 2009	Kitt Peak	Spacewatch	MAS	640 m	MPC · JPL
490310	2009 BQ_{38}	—	January 16, 2009	Kitt Peak	Spacewatch	·	1.8 km	MPC · JPL
490311	2009 BG_{40}	—	January 16, 2009	Kitt Peak	Spacewatch	·	880 m	MPC · JPL
490312	2009 BS_{40}	—	January 16, 2009	Kitt Peak	Spacewatch	MAS	640 m	MPC · JPL
490313	2009 BQ_{43}	—	January 1, 2009	Kitt Peak	Spacewatch	H	410 m	MPC · JPL
490314	2009 BE_{51}	—	December 29, 2008	Mount Lemmon	Mount Lemmon Survey	·	1.5 km	MPC · JPL
490315	2009 BL_{57}	—	December 22, 2008	Mount Lemmon	Mount Lemmon Survey	NYS	1.1 km	MPC · JPL
490316	2009 BP_{64}	—	January 20, 2009	Kitt Peak	Spacewatch	·	960 m	MPC · JPL
490317	2009 BF_{66}	—	January 20, 2009	Kitt Peak	Spacewatch	·	850 m	MPC · JPL
490318	2009 BE_{67}	—	January 16, 2009	Kitt Peak	Spacewatch	·	2.4 km	MPC · JPL
490319	2009 BC_{72}	—	January 3, 2009	Mount Lemmon	Mount Lemmon Survey	·	910 m	MPC · JPL
490320	2009 BM_{75}	—	December 31, 2008	Kitt Peak	Spacewatch	·	1.2 km	MPC · JPL
490321	2009 BB_{80}	—	January 31, 2009	Socorro	LINEAR	·	1.2 km	MPC · JPL
490322	2009 BN_{95}	—	January 2, 2009	Mount Lemmon	Mount Lemmon Survey	NYS	940 m	MPC · JPL
490323	2009 BM_{119}	—	December 21, 2008	Kitt Peak	Spacewatch	·	1.5 km	MPC · JPL
490324	2009 BF_{142}	—	January 20, 2009	Kitt Peak	Spacewatch	·	1.2 km	MPC · JPL
490325	2009 BA_{149}	—	January 31, 2009	Kitt Peak	Spacewatch	KOR	1.1 km	MPC · JPL
490326	2009 BW_{152}	—	January 16, 2009	Mount Lemmon	Mount Lemmon Survey	·	1.0 km	MPC · JPL
490327	2009 BE_{159}	—	January 31, 2009	Kitt Peak	Spacewatch	·	1.0 km	MPC · JPL
490328	2009 BS_{166}	—	January 31, 2009	Mount Lemmon	Mount Lemmon Survey	·	1.1 km	MPC · JPL
490329	2009 BZ_{173}	—	January 25, 2009	Kitt Peak	Spacewatch	·	980 m	MPC · JPL
490330	2009 BZ_{179}	—	January 16, 2005	Kitt Peak	Spacewatch	·	890 m	MPC · JPL
490331	2009 BJ_{182}	—	January 17, 2009	Kitt Peak	Spacewatch	MAS	600 m	MPC · JPL
490332	2009 BE_{185}	—	January 22, 2009	Socorro	LINEAR	H	500 m	MPC · JPL
490333	2009 BY_{186}	—	January 25, 2009	Kitt Peak	Spacewatch	·	2.6 km	MPC · JPL
490334	2009 CK	—	December 29, 2008	Catalina	CSS	H	520 m	MPC · JPL
490335	2009 CN_{25}	—	October 11, 2007	Kitt Peak	Spacewatch	·	1.7 km	MPC · JPL
490336	2009 CC_{35}	—	February 2, 2009	Mount Lemmon	Mount Lemmon Survey	·	980 m	MPC · JPL
490337	2009 DE_{8}	—	December 30, 2008	Mount Lemmon	Mount Lemmon Survey	·	2.9 km	MPC · JPL
490338	2009 DV_{26}	—	February 22, 2009	Calar Alto	F. Hormuth	·	1.0 km	MPC · JPL
490339	2009 DN_{30}	—	September 25, 2006	Kitt Peak	Spacewatch	·	2.3 km	MPC · JPL
490340	2009 DO_{49}	—	February 19, 2009	Kitt Peak	Spacewatch	·	1.7 km	MPC · JPL
490341	2009 DW_{59}	—	February 22, 2009	Kitt Peak	Spacewatch	·	990 m	MPC · JPL
490342	2009 DL_{68}	—	February 21, 2009	Mount Lemmon	Mount Lemmon Survey	·	830 m	MPC · JPL
490343	2009 DD_{71}	—	January 20, 2009	Kitt Peak	Spacewatch	·	1.2 km	MPC · JPL
490344	2009 DE_{81}	—	February 3, 2009	Mount Lemmon	Mount Lemmon Survey	(5)	1.1 km	MPC · JPL
490345	2009 DB_{104}	—	February 26, 2009	Mount Lemmon	Mount Lemmon Survey	·	750 m	MPC · JPL
490346	2009 DJ_{110}	—	February 25, 2009	Catalina	CSS	·	2.0 km	MPC · JPL
490347	2009 DE_{132}	—	January 31, 2009	Kitt Peak	Spacewatch	·	2.4 km	MPC · JPL
490348	2009 DS_{139}	—	February 26, 2009	Catalina	CSS	·	2.7 km	MPC · JPL
490349	2009 EM	—	February 22, 2009	Kitt Peak	Spacewatch	H	480 m	MPC · JPL
490350	2009 ES_{5}	—	March 1, 2009	Kitt Peak	Spacewatch	·	2.6 km	MPC · JPL
490351	2009 EX_{8}	—	March 2, 2009	Kitt Peak	Spacewatch	·	1.4 km	MPC · JPL
490352	2009 EY_{15}	—	March 3, 2009	Mount Lemmon	Mount Lemmon Survey	·	2.2 km	MPC · JPL
490353	2009 EH_{19}	—	January 19, 2009	Mount Lemmon	Mount Lemmon Survey	·	1.1 km	MPC · JPL
490354	2009 FF_{19}	—	March 21, 2009	Mount Lemmon	Mount Lemmon Survey	APO · PHA	190 m	MPC · JPL
490355	2009 FQ_{28}	—	March 18, 2009	Catalina	CSS	·	3.8 km	MPC · JPL
490356	2009 FM_{43}	—	March 30, 2009	Sierra Stars	Tozzi, F.	·	990 m	MPC · JPL
490357	2009 FM_{46}	—	January 18, 2009	Mount Lemmon	Mount Lemmon Survey	H	560 m	MPC · JPL
490358	2009 FP_{57}	—	March 28, 2009	Kitt Peak	Spacewatch	H	550 m	MPC · JPL
490359	2009 FM_{65}	—	March 18, 2009	Mount Lemmon	Mount Lemmon Survey	·	890 m	MPC · JPL
490360	2009 FD_{72}	—	March 17, 2009	Kitt Peak	Spacewatch	EUN	1.0 km	MPC · JPL
490361	2009 HR_{11}	—	April 18, 2009	Kitt Peak	Spacewatch	·	1.1 km	MPC · JPL
490362	2009 HG_{20}	—	April 18, 2009	Kitt Peak	Spacewatch	·	950 m	MPC · JPL
490363	2009 HA_{24}	—	December 30, 2007	Kitt Peak	Spacewatch	·	1.0 km	MPC · JPL
490364	2009 HO_{34}	—	April 20, 2009	Mount Lemmon	Mount Lemmon Survey	KON	1.8 km	MPC · JPL
490365	2009 HU_{34}	—	March 17, 2009	Kitt Peak	Spacewatch	·	1.2 km	MPC · JPL
490366	2009 HZ_{34}	—	October 20, 2006	Kitt Peak	Spacewatch	·	1.3 km	MPC · JPL
490367	2009 HC_{37}	—	April 17, 2009	Kitt Peak	Spacewatch	·	1.5 km	MPC · JPL
490368	2009 HV_{50}	—	February 27, 2009	Mount Lemmon	Mount Lemmon Survey	EUN	1.1 km	MPC · JPL
490369	2009 HV_{73}	—	March 29, 2009	Catalina	CSS	H	570 m	MPC · JPL
490370	2009 HV_{74}	—	April 27, 2009	Mount Lemmon	Mount Lemmon Survey	H	570 m	MPC · JPL
490371	2009 HT_{84}	—	April 23, 2009	Kitt Peak	Spacewatch	EUN	1.1 km	MPC · JPL
490372	2009 JZ_{3}	—	April 23, 2009	Mount Lemmon	Mount Lemmon Survey	H	620 m	MPC · JPL
490373	2009 JY_{6}	—	May 13, 2009	Mount Lemmon	Mount Lemmon Survey	EUN	1.1 km	MPC · JPL
490374	2009 JT_{9}	—	May 14, 2009	Kitt Peak	Spacewatch	H	510 m	MPC · JPL
490375	2009 JU_{9}	—	May 1, 2009	Mount Lemmon	Mount Lemmon Survey	·	1.1 km	MPC · JPL
490376	2009 JO_{17}	—	May 1, 2009	Mount Lemmon	Mount Lemmon Survey	·	1.1 km	MPC · JPL
490377	2009 KY_{3}	—	May 13, 2009	Kitt Peak	Spacewatch	·	780 m	MPC · JPL
490378	2009 KJ_{23}	—	May 15, 2009	Kitt Peak	Spacewatch	·	960 m	MPC · JPL
490379	2009 KF_{24}	—	May 1, 2009	Kitt Peak	Spacewatch	·	1.0 km	MPC · JPL
490380	2009 LH	—	April 23, 2009	Mount Lemmon	Mount Lemmon Survey	·	960 m	MPC · JPL
490381	2009 OE_{10}	—	July 29, 2009	La Sagra	OAM	·	1.4 km	MPC · JPL
490382	2009 OX_{19}	—	July 31, 2009	Catalina	CSS	·	3.9 km	MPC · JPL
490383	2009 OK_{22}	—	July 28, 2009	La Sagra	OAM	·	2.3 km	MPC · JPL
490384	2009 ON_{23}	—	July 27, 2009	Kitt Peak	Spacewatch	EUN	1.2 km	MPC · JPL
490385	2009 PO_{2}	—	August 13, 2009	La Sagra	OAM	·	650 m	MPC · JPL
490386	2009 PX_{2}	—	August 15, 2009	Altschwendt	W. Ries	·	1.5 km	MPC · JPL
490387	2009 PS_{5}	—	September 29, 2005	Mount Lemmon	Mount Lemmon Survey	·	1.4 km	MPC · JPL
490388	2009 PP_{18}	—	August 15, 2009	Kitt Peak	Spacewatch	·	930 m	MPC · JPL
490389	2009 QK_{1}	—	August 16, 2009	La Sagra	OAM	H	610 m	MPC · JPL
490390	2009 QA_{5}	—	August 16, 2009	La Sagra	OAM	·	720 m	MPC · JPL
490391	2009 QT_{7}	—	August 18, 2009	Bergisch Gladbach	W. Bickel	·	1.4 km	MPC · JPL
490392	2009 QH_{13}	—	August 16, 2009	Kitt Peak	Spacewatch	·	910 m	MPC · JPL
490393	2009 QJ_{13}	—	August 16, 2009	Kitt Peak	Spacewatch	·	1.5 km	MPC · JPL
490394	2009 QN_{21}	—	August 19, 2009	La Sagra	OAM	·	1.6 km	MPC · JPL
490395	2009 QE_{23}	—	August 16, 2009	La Sagra	OAM	ADE	2.3 km	MPC · JPL
490396	2009 QU_{24}	—	August 18, 2009	Kitt Peak	Spacewatch	·	1.6 km	MPC · JPL
490397	2009 QH_{40}	—	August 16, 2001	Socorro	LINEAR	3:2	4.9 km	MPC · JPL
490398	2009 QS_{56}	—	August 17, 2009	La Sagra	OAM	·	2.2 km	MPC · JPL
490399	2009 QP_{61}	—	August 26, 2009	Socorro	LINEAR	·	2.8 km	MPC · JPL
490400	2009 RA	—	September 1, 2009	La Sagra	OAM	·	2.1 km	MPC · JPL

== 490401–490500 ==
back to top

Designation			Discovery			Properties		Ref
Permanent	Provisional	Named after	Date	Site	Discoverer(s)	Category	Diam.	Ref
490401	2009 RY_{1}	—	September 10, 2009	ESA OGS	ESA OGS	AEO	1.1 km	MPC · JPL
490402	2009 RV_{11}	—	September 12, 2009	Kitt Peak	Spacewatch	KOR	1.2 km	MPC · JPL
490403	2009 RR_{29}	—	September 14, 2009	Kitt Peak	Spacewatch	·	2.4 km	MPC · JPL
490404	2009 RQ_{33}	—	September 14, 2009	Kitt Peak	Spacewatch	L4	6.2 km	MPC · JPL
490405	2009 RP_{34}	—	September 14, 2009	Kitt Peak	Spacewatch	·	1.7 km	MPC · JPL
490406	2009 RS_{39}	—	September 15, 2009	Kitt Peak	Spacewatch	·	2.5 km	MPC · JPL
490407	2009 RM_{49}	—	September 15, 2009	Kitt Peak	Spacewatch	·	2.6 km	MPC · JPL
490408	2009 RV_{56}	—	September 15, 2009	Kitt Peak	Spacewatch	·	2.5 km	MPC · JPL
490409	2009 RW_{70}	—	September 15, 2009	Kitt Peak	Spacewatch	·	660 m	MPC · JPL
490410	2009 RL_{72}	—	September 10, 2009	Catalina	CSS	·	3.0 km	MPC · JPL
490411	2009 RP_{73}	—	September 15, 2009	Kitt Peak	Spacewatch	T_{j} (2.98)	3.0 km	MPC · JPL
490412	2009 SX_{14}	—	September 18, 2009	Bisei SG Center	BATTeRS	·	1.4 km	MPC · JPL
490413	2009 SC_{32}	—	September 16, 2009	Mount Lemmon	Mount Lemmon Survey	·	1.6 km	MPC · JPL
490414	2009 SC_{34}	—	September 16, 2009	Kitt Peak	Spacewatch	EOS	1.7 km	MPC · JPL
490415	2009 SU_{35}	—	September 16, 2009	Kitt Peak	Spacewatch	L4	7.4 km	MPC · JPL
490416	2009 SD_{40}	—	September 16, 2009	Kitt Peak	Spacewatch	·	2.4 km	MPC · JPL
490417	2009 SX_{42}	—	September 16, 2009	Kitt Peak	Spacewatch	·	2.6 km	MPC · JPL
490418	2009 SY_{42}	—	September 16, 2009	Kitt Peak	Spacewatch	L4	7.3 km	MPC · JPL
490419	2009 SO_{43}	—	September 16, 2009	Kitt Peak	Spacewatch	KON	2.0 km	MPC · JPL
490420	2009 SG_{50}	—	September 17, 2009	Kitt Peak	Spacewatch	·	2.8 km	MPC · JPL
490421	2009 SX_{53}	—	September 17, 2009	Kitt Peak	Spacewatch	·	560 m	MPC · JPL
490422	2009 SM_{56}	—	September 17, 2009	Kitt Peak	Spacewatch	·	2.2 km	MPC · JPL
490423	2009 SP_{56}	—	September 17, 2009	Kitt Peak	Spacewatch	·	640 m	MPC · JPL
490424	2009 SN_{61}	—	September 17, 2009	Kitt Peak	Spacewatch	EUN	900 m	MPC · JPL
490425	2009 SP_{68}	—	September 17, 2009	Mount Lemmon	Mount Lemmon Survey	·	1.5 km	MPC · JPL
490426	2009 SY_{69}	—	August 29, 2009	Kitt Peak	Spacewatch	·	530 m	MPC · JPL
490427	2009 SU_{73}	—	September 17, 2009	Kitt Peak	Spacewatch	·	2.3 km	MPC · JPL
490428	2009 SL_{75}	—	September 17, 2009	Kitt Peak	Spacewatch	·	1.7 km	MPC · JPL
490429	2009 SB_{77}	—	September 17, 2009	Kitt Peak	Spacewatch	·	1.8 km	MPC · JPL
490430	2009 SB_{81}	—	August 16, 2009	Kitt Peak	Spacewatch	(5)	880 m	MPC · JPL
490431	2009 SE_{88}	—	September 18, 2009	Kitt Peak	Spacewatch	·	1.7 km	MPC · JPL
490432	2009 SF_{96}	—	September 19, 2009	Mount Lemmon	Mount Lemmon Survey	·	2.6 km	MPC · JPL
490433	2009 SJ_{107}	—	September 16, 2009	Kitt Peak	Spacewatch	·	2.4 km	MPC · JPL
490434	2009 SR_{107}	—	September 16, 2009	Kitt Peak	Spacewatch	CLA	1.6 km	MPC · JPL
490435	2009 SA_{114}	—	September 18, 2009	Kitt Peak	Spacewatch	MRX	1.1 km	MPC · JPL
490436	2009 SQ_{117}	—	September 18, 2009	Kitt Peak	Spacewatch	·	1.6 km	MPC · JPL
490437	2009 SC_{120}	—	September 18, 2009	Kitt Peak	Spacewatch	·	1.6 km	MPC · JPL
490438	2009 SY_{124}	—	September 18, 2009	Kitt Peak	Spacewatch	·	1.9 km	MPC · JPL
490439	2009 SU_{130}	—	September 18, 2009	Kitt Peak	Spacewatch	·	450 m	MPC · JPL
490440	2009 SA_{136}	—	September 18, 2009	Kitt Peak	Spacewatch	·	2.4 km	MPC · JPL
490441	2009 SG_{136}	—	September 18, 2009	Kitt Peak	Spacewatch	NYS	990 m	MPC · JPL
490442	2009 SF_{145}	—	September 19, 2009	Mount Lemmon	Mount Lemmon Survey	·	880 m	MPC · JPL
490443	2009 SR_{146}	—	September 19, 2009	Kitt Peak	Spacewatch	·	630 m	MPC · JPL
490444	2009 ST_{151}	—	September 20, 2009	Kitt Peak	Spacewatch	EOS	1.6 km	MPC · JPL
490445	2009 SL_{158}	—	September 20, 2009	Kitt Peak	Spacewatch	·	3.7 km	MPC · JPL
490446	2009 SO_{164}	—	September 21, 2009	Kitt Peak	Spacewatch	L4	7.1 km	MPC · JPL
490447	2009 SX_{166}	—	September 22, 2009	Kitt Peak	Spacewatch	LIX	2.7 km	MPC · JPL
490448	2009 SJ_{184}	—	September 21, 2009	Kitt Peak	Spacewatch	L4	7.1 km	MPC · JPL
490449	2009 SN_{192}	—	September 14, 2009	Kitt Peak	Spacewatch	DOR	2.2 km	MPC · JPL
490450	2009 SX_{204}	—	September 18, 2009	Kitt Peak	Spacewatch	·	2.6 km	MPC · JPL
490451	2009 SY_{204}	—	September 22, 2009	Kitt Peak	Spacewatch	·	3.4 km	MPC · JPL
490452	2009 SR_{209}	—	September 18, 2009	Kitt Peak	Spacewatch	·	2.8 km	MPC · JPL
490453	2009 SU_{213}	—	September 23, 2009	Kitt Peak	Spacewatch	·	530 m	MPC · JPL
490454	2009 SM_{214}	—	September 15, 2009	Kitt Peak	Spacewatch	·	610 m	MPC · JPL
490455	2009 SO_{214}	—	September 23, 2009	Kitt Peak	Spacewatch	·	790 m	MPC · JPL
490456	2009 SA_{240}	—	August 31, 2009	Siding Spring	SSS	·	4.1 km	MPC · JPL
490457	2009 SE_{250}	—	September 19, 2009	Kitt Peak	Spacewatch	·	1.0 km	MPC · JPL
490458	2009 SL_{262}	—	October 29, 2005	Catalina	CSS	·	1.1 km	MPC · JPL
490459	2009 SD_{266}	—	September 23, 2009	Mount Lemmon	Mount Lemmon Survey	·	990 m	MPC · JPL
490460	2009 ST_{270}	—	January 30, 2000	Kitt Peak	Spacewatch	VER	6.1 km	MPC · JPL
490461	2009 SV_{271}	—	September 20, 2009	Kitt Peak	Spacewatch	·	2.6 km	MPC · JPL
490462	2009 SX_{271}	—	September 24, 2009	Kitt Peak	Spacewatch	·	2.5 km	MPC · JPL
490463	2009 SD_{275}	—	September 25, 2009	Kitt Peak	Spacewatch	·	700 m	MPC · JPL
490464	2009 SB_{283}	—	September 25, 2009	Kitt Peak	Spacewatch	EOS	1.7 km	MPC · JPL
490465	2009 SM_{287}	—	September 25, 2009	Kitt Peak	Spacewatch	·	1.7 km	MPC · JPL
490466	2009 SW_{287}	—	September 25, 2009	Kitt Peak	Spacewatch	NAE	3.2 km	MPC · JPL
490467	2009 SY_{289}	—	September 17, 2009	Kitt Peak	Spacewatch	·	600 m	MPC · JPL
490468	2009 SB_{291}	—	September 17, 2009	Kitt Peak	Spacewatch	THB	2.6 km	MPC · JPL
490469	2009 SU_{293}	—	September 26, 2009	Kitt Peak	Spacewatch	(2076)	720 m	MPC · JPL
490470	2009 ST_{299}	—	September 16, 2009	Kitt Peak	Spacewatch	·	2.4 km	MPC · JPL
490471	2009 SS_{321}	—	September 21, 2009	Kitt Peak	Spacewatch	·	2.5 km	MPC · JPL
490472	2009 SU_{323}	—	September 23, 2009	Kitt Peak	Spacewatch	·	2.4 km	MPC · JPL
490473	2009 SO_{324}	—	September 24, 2009	Kitt Peak	Spacewatch	·	610 m	MPC · JPL
490474	2009 SZ_{334}	—	September 29, 2009	Mount Lemmon	Mount Lemmon Survey	·	2.6 km	MPC · JPL
490475	2009 SW_{344}	—	September 18, 2009	Kitt Peak	Spacewatch	·	1.2 km	MPC · JPL
490476	2009 SK_{345}	—	September 18, 2009	Kitt Peak	Spacewatch	·	1.2 km	MPC · JPL
490477	2009 SQ_{345}	—	September 19, 2009	Kitt Peak	Spacewatch	·	2.1 km	MPC · JPL
490478	2009 SG_{349}	—	September 23, 2009	Mount Lemmon	Mount Lemmon Survey	·	3.2 km	MPC · JPL
490479	2009 SM_{350}	—	September 25, 2009	Kitt Peak	Spacewatch	·	1.9 km	MPC · JPL
490480	2009 SV_{350}	—	September 28, 2009	Mount Lemmon	Mount Lemmon Survey	·	2.4 km	MPC · JPL
490481	2009 SO_{352}	—	September 16, 2009	Kitt Peak	Spacewatch	EOS	1.7 km	MPC · JPL
490482	2009 SZ_{352}	—	September 18, 2009	Kitt Peak	Spacewatch	·	2.4 km	MPC · JPL
490483	2009 SH_{353}	—	September 16, 2009	Kitt Peak	Spacewatch	·	1.5 km	MPC · JPL
490484	2009 SJ_{353}	—	September 25, 2009	Kitt Peak	Spacewatch	T_{j} (2.92)	3.8 km	MPC · JPL
490485	2009 SK_{360}	—	September 28, 2009	Catalina	CSS	·	3.3 km	MPC · JPL
490486	2009 SW_{362}	—	September 21, 2009	Mount Lemmon	Mount Lemmon Survey	·	2.4 km	MPC · JPL
490487	2009 TM_{1}	—	October 11, 2009	La Sagra	OAM	·	1.3 km	MPC · JPL
490488	2009 TR_{6}	—	October 12, 2009	La Sagra	OAM	·	2.6 km	MPC · JPL
490489	2009 TM_{7}	—	October 13, 2009	La Sagra	OAM	·	3.3 km	MPC · JPL
490490	2009 TA_{34}	—	September 17, 2009	La Sagra	OAM	·	1.7 km	MPC · JPL
490491	2009 TH_{39}	—	October 15, 2009	Catalina	CSS	·	660 m	MPC · JPL
490492	2009 UA_{5}	—	October 17, 2009	La Sagra	OAM	·	2.1 km	MPC · JPL
490493	2009 UN_{5}	—	September 21, 2009	Catalina	CSS	·	690 m	MPC · JPL
490494	2009 UF_{13}	—	October 18, 2009	Mount Lemmon	Mount Lemmon Survey	·	570 m	MPC · JPL
490495	2009 UN_{15}	—	October 17, 2009	Mount Lemmon	Mount Lemmon Survey	·	2.1 km	MPC · JPL
490496	2009 UN_{17}	—	September 29, 2009	Mount Lemmon	Mount Lemmon Survey	·	790 m	MPC · JPL
490497	2009 UM_{19}	—	September 16, 2009	Mount Lemmon	Mount Lemmon Survey	·	1.3 km	MPC · JPL
490498	2009 UR_{28}	—	October 18, 2009	Mount Lemmon	Mount Lemmon Survey	·	690 m	MPC · JPL
490499	2009 UQ_{34}	—	October 21, 2009	Kitt Peak	Spacewatch	·	2.3 km	MPC · JPL
490500	2009 UF_{35}	—	October 23, 1995	Kitt Peak	Spacewatch	·	540 m	MPC · JPL

== 490501–490600 ==
back to top

Designation			Discovery			Properties		Ref
Permanent	Provisional	Named after	Date	Site	Discoverer(s)	Category	Diam.	Ref
490501	2009 UF_{36}	—	September 22, 2009	Mount Lemmon	Mount Lemmon Survey	·	2.0 km	MPC · JPL
490502	2009 UA_{38}	—	September 22, 2009	Mount Lemmon	Mount Lemmon Survey	·	3.7 km	MPC · JPL
490503	2009 UR_{38}	—	September 22, 2009	Mount Lemmon	Mount Lemmon Survey	·	580 m	MPC · JPL
490504	2009 UD_{39}	—	October 22, 2009	Mount Lemmon	Mount Lemmon Survey	·	2.4 km	MPC · JPL
490505	2009 UF_{53}	—	September 21, 2009	Mount Lemmon	Mount Lemmon Survey	·	1.9 km	MPC · JPL
490506	2009 UK_{68}	—	October 17, 2009	Mount Lemmon	Mount Lemmon Survey	EOS	1.4 km	MPC · JPL
490507	2009 UB_{69}	—	August 16, 2009	Kitt Peak	Spacewatch	·	2.3 km	MPC · JPL
490508	2009 UD_{71}	—	October 11, 2009	La Sagra	OAM	·	4.0 km	MPC · JPL
490509	2009 UF_{78}	—	September 14, 2009	Kitt Peak	Spacewatch	·	3.3 km	MPC · JPL
490510	2009 UF_{83}	—	October 23, 2009	Mount Lemmon	Mount Lemmon Survey	·	1.0 km	MPC · JPL
490511	2009 UC_{85}	—	October 23, 2009	Mount Lemmon	Mount Lemmon Survey	·	1.5 km	MPC · JPL
490512	2009 UY_{86}	—	September 16, 2009	Mount Lemmon	Mount Lemmon Survey	·	760 m	MPC · JPL
490513	2009 UT_{97}	—	October 23, 2009	Mount Lemmon	Mount Lemmon Survey	EOS	1.5 km	MPC · JPL
490514	2009 UF_{101}	—	September 18, 2009	Mount Lemmon	Mount Lemmon Survey	EOS	1.4 km	MPC · JPL
490515	2009 UY_{104}	—	October 25, 2009	Mount Lemmon	Mount Lemmon Survey	·	2.7 km	MPC · JPL
490516	2009 UU_{109}	—	October 23, 2009	Mount Lemmon	Mount Lemmon Survey	·	4.0 km	MPC · JPL
490517	2009 UF_{117}	—	October 22, 2009	Mount Lemmon	Mount Lemmon Survey	·	2.8 km	MPC · JPL
490518	2009 UW_{120}	—	September 18, 2009	Kitt Peak	Spacewatch	·	1.7 km	MPC · JPL
490519	2009 UL_{121}	—	September 21, 2009	Mount Lemmon	Mount Lemmon Survey	·	2.6 km	MPC · JPL
490520	2009 UA_{123}	—	October 14, 2009	La Sagra	OAM	·	3.4 km	MPC · JPL
490521	2009 UQ_{128}	—	September 20, 2009	Kitt Peak	Spacewatch	·	2.5 km	MPC · JPL
490522	2009 UO_{137}	—	October 1, 2009	Mount Lemmon	Mount Lemmon Survey	·	2.8 km	MPC · JPL
490523	2009 UR_{137}	—	October 17, 2009	Catalina	CSS	·	2.1 km	MPC · JPL
490524	2009 US_{139}	—	October 27, 2009	La Sagra	OAM	·	1.0 km	MPC · JPL
490525	2009 UF_{141}	—	October 24, 2009	Catalina	CSS	T_{j} (2.99)	3.6 km	MPC · JPL
490526	2009 UH_{142}	—	October 18, 2009	Mount Lemmon	Mount Lemmon Survey	·	2.2 km	MPC · JPL
490527	2009 UK_{146}	—	October 23, 2009	Mount Lemmon	Mount Lemmon Survey	·	2.8 km	MPC · JPL
490528	2009 UQ_{154}	—	October 14, 2009	La Sagra	OAM	·	2.3 km	MPC · JPL
490529	2009 VC	—	November 6, 2009	Great Shefford	Birtwhistle, P.	·	3.2 km	MPC · JPL
490530	2009 VJ_{7}	—	October 30, 2009	Mount Lemmon	Mount Lemmon Survey	·	920 m	MPC · JPL
490531	2009 VO_{17}	—	October 24, 2009	Catalina	CSS	·	1.3 km	MPC · JPL
490532	2009 VZ_{17}	—	November 9, 2009	Kitt Peak	Spacewatch	·	1.5 km	MPC · JPL
490533	2009 VP_{24}	—	October 14, 2009	Catalina	CSS	·	3.3 km	MPC · JPL
490534	2009 VW_{27}	—	November 8, 2009	Catalina	CSS	·	3.9 km	MPC · JPL
490535	2009 VQ_{29}	—	November 9, 2009	Catalina	CSS	·	670 m	MPC · JPL
490536	2009 VJ_{30}	—	November 9, 2009	Mount Lemmon	Mount Lemmon Survey	VER	2.4 km	MPC · JPL
490537	2009 VQ_{37}	—	October 27, 2009	Kitt Peak	Spacewatch	·	2.8 km	MPC · JPL
490538	2009 VK_{38}	—	November 9, 2009	Kitt Peak	Spacewatch	NYS	890 m	MPC · JPL
490539	2009 VL_{41}	—	October 25, 2009	Catalina	CSS	·	1.5 km	MPC · JPL
490540	2009 VD_{46}	—	November 9, 2009	Kitt Peak	Spacewatch	·	2.6 km	MPC · JPL
490541	2009 VN_{48}	—	November 9, 2009	Mount Lemmon	Mount Lemmon Survey	AGN	990 m	MPC · JPL
490542	2009 VY_{48}	—	September 22, 2009	Mount Lemmon	Mount Lemmon Survey	·	670 m	MPC · JPL
490543	2009 VD_{55}	—	October 1, 2009	Mount Lemmon	Mount Lemmon Survey	·	2.9 km	MPC · JPL
490544	2009 VW_{68}	—	November 9, 2009	Mount Lemmon	Mount Lemmon Survey	·	620 m	MPC · JPL
490545	2009 VR_{70}	—	December 29, 2005	Kitt Peak	Spacewatch	·	1.6 km	MPC · JPL
490546	2009 VB_{72}	—	October 12, 2009	Mount Lemmon	Mount Lemmon Survey	·	1.1 km	MPC · JPL
490547	2009 VG_{73}	—	November 11, 2009	Mount Lemmon	Mount Lemmon Survey	·	590 m	MPC · JPL
490548	2009 VS_{81}	—	November 8, 2009	Kitt Peak	Spacewatch	·	710 m	MPC · JPL
490549	2009 VP_{84}	—	November 9, 2009	Kitt Peak	Spacewatch	VER	2.6 km	MPC · JPL
490550	2009 VU_{88}	—	November 11, 2009	Kitt Peak	Spacewatch	·	950 m	MPC · JPL
490551	2009 VC_{89}	—	September 16, 2009	Kitt Peak	Spacewatch	DOR	2.2 km	MPC · JPL
490552	2009 VR_{90}	—	November 11, 2009	Kitt Peak	Spacewatch	·	3.2 km	MPC · JPL
490553	2009 VB_{99}	—	July 29, 2008	La Sagra	OAM	·	2.5 km	MPC · JPL
490554	2009 VV_{103}	—	November 8, 2009	Kitt Peak	Spacewatch	·	5.3 km	MPC · JPL
490555	2009 VH_{116}	—	November 11, 2009	Kitt Peak	Spacewatch	·	2.3 km	MPC · JPL
490556	2009 WL_{5}	—	November 16, 2009	Kitt Peak	Spacewatch	·	2.7 km	MPC · JPL
490557	2009 WC_{19}	—	October 22, 2009	Mount Lemmon	Mount Lemmon Survey	·	1.1 km	MPC · JPL
490558	2009 WT_{19}	—	November 17, 2009	Mount Lemmon	Mount Lemmon Survey	·	1.5 km	MPC · JPL
490559	2009 WR_{20}	—	September 22, 2009	Mount Lemmon	Mount Lemmon Survey	·	1.4 km	MPC · JPL
490560	2009 WQ_{24}	—	November 20, 2009	Calvin-Rehoboth	L. A. Molnar	·	570 m	MPC · JPL
490561	2009 WY_{25}	—	October 24, 2009	Kitt Peak	Spacewatch	L4	8.7 km	MPC · JPL
490562	2009 WU_{26}	—	October 27, 2009	Kitt Peak	Spacewatch	·	1.6 km	MPC · JPL
490563	2009 WD_{32}	—	November 16, 2009	Kitt Peak	Spacewatch	·	2.2 km	MPC · JPL
490564	2009 WQ_{32}	—	January 26, 2007	Kitt Peak	Spacewatch	·	420 m	MPC · JPL
490565	2009 WK_{39}	—	September 20, 2009	Mount Lemmon	Mount Lemmon Survey	NYS	1 km	MPC · JPL
490566	2009 WM_{39}	—	November 17, 2009	Kitt Peak	Spacewatch	·	3.1 km	MPC · JPL
490567	2009 WJ_{44}	—	September 18, 2009	Mount Lemmon	Mount Lemmon Survey	·	3.5 km	MPC · JPL
490568	2009 WD_{51}	—	November 16, 2009	Kitt Peak	Spacewatch	·	670 m	MPC · JPL
490569	2009 WS_{57}	—	November 16, 2009	Mount Lemmon	Mount Lemmon Survey	·	1.7 km	MPC · JPL
490570	2009 WD_{59}	—	October 18, 2009	Mount Lemmon	Mount Lemmon Survey	EMA	3.5 km	MPC · JPL
490571	2009 WU_{59}	—	October 22, 2009	Mount Lemmon	Mount Lemmon Survey	EOS	1.8 km	MPC · JPL
490572	2009 WR_{62}	—	November 16, 2009	Mount Lemmon	Mount Lemmon Survey	·	2.7 km	MPC · JPL
490573	2009 WB_{65}	—	September 24, 2009	Mount Lemmon	Mount Lemmon Survey	(2076)	660 m	MPC · JPL
490574	2009 WR_{76}	—	November 10, 2009	Kitt Peak	Spacewatch	·	3.3 km	MPC · JPL
490575	2009 WG_{82}	—	July 29, 2008	Mount Lemmon	Mount Lemmon Survey	EOS	1.6 km	MPC · JPL
490576	2009 WF_{83}	—	November 19, 2009	Kitt Peak	Spacewatch	(5)	2.0 km	MPC · JPL
490577	2009 WO_{87}	—	September 20, 2009	Mount Lemmon	Mount Lemmon Survey	EOS	1.8 km	MPC · JPL
490578	2009 WV_{98}	—	October 30, 2009	Mount Lemmon	Mount Lemmon Survey	·	1.6 km	MPC · JPL
490579	2009 WA_{101}	—	November 22, 2009	Kitt Peak	Spacewatch	·	1.7 km	MPC · JPL
490580	2009 WL_{104}	—	November 18, 2009	La Sagra	OAM	·	5.0 km	MPC · JPL
490581	2009 WZ_{104}	—	November 25, 2009	Catalina	CSS	ATE · PHA	240 m	MPC · JPL
490582	2009 WD_{113}	—	November 18, 2009	Kitt Peak	Spacewatch	·	2.7 km	MPC · JPL
490583	2009 WP_{114}	—	September 19, 2009	Kitt Peak	Spacewatch	EOS	1.5 km	MPC · JPL
490584	2009 WV_{118}	—	November 8, 2009	Kitt Peak	Spacewatch	·	700 m	MPC · JPL
490585	2009 WE_{119}	—	November 20, 2009	Kitt Peak	Spacewatch	·	4.1 km	MPC · JPL
490586	2009 WW_{120}	—	October 22, 2009	Mount Lemmon	Mount Lemmon Survey	·	810 m	MPC · JPL
490587	2009 WT_{127}	—	December 18, 2001	Socorro	LINEAR	·	940 m	MPC · JPL
490588	2009 WF_{133}	—	October 23, 2009	Kitt Peak	Spacewatch	·	2.6 km	MPC · JPL
490589	2009 WZ_{135}	—	April 15, 2007	Kitt Peak	Spacewatch	·	1.9 km	MPC · JPL
490590	2009 WT_{145}	—	November 19, 2009	Mount Lemmon	Mount Lemmon Survey	·	1.1 km	MPC · JPL
490591	2009 WG_{155}	—	November 19, 2009	La Sagra	OAM	·	2.9 km	MPC · JPL
490592	2009 WO_{167}	—	October 25, 2009	Kitt Peak	Spacewatch	THB	2.9 km	MPC · JPL
490593	2009 WL_{169}	—	November 10, 2009	Kitt Peak	Spacewatch	V	480 m	MPC · JPL
490594	2009 WL_{170}	—	November 9, 2009	Mount Lemmon	Mount Lemmon Survey	·	1.7 km	MPC · JPL
490595	2009 WL_{172}	—	November 11, 2009	Kitt Peak	Spacewatch	·	1.6 km	MPC · JPL
490596	2009 WH_{173}	—	November 22, 2009	Kitt Peak	Spacewatch	EOS	2.1 km	MPC · JPL
490597	2009 WK_{173}	—	April 28, 2000	Socorro	LINEAR	THB	3.4 km	MPC · JPL
490598	2009 WR_{175}	—	November 23, 2009	Kitt Peak	Spacewatch	·	550 m	MPC · JPL
490599	2009 WX_{175}	—	November 11, 2009	Kitt Peak	Spacewatch	·	2.6 km	MPC · JPL
490600	2009 WK_{176}	—	November 23, 2009	Kitt Peak	Spacewatch	·	3.6 km	MPC · JPL

== 490601–490700 ==
back to top

Designation			Discovery			Properties		Ref
Permanent	Provisional	Named after	Date	Site	Discoverer(s)	Category	Diam.	Ref
490601	2009 WO_{177}	—	November 23, 2009	Kitt Peak	Spacewatch	·	2.5 km	MPC · JPL
490602	2009 WU_{178}	—	November 11, 2009	Kitt Peak	Spacewatch	·	2.9 km	MPC · JPL
490603	2009 WO_{179}	—	April 25, 2006	Kitt Peak	Spacewatch	·	2.6 km	MPC · JPL
490604	2009 WT_{180}	—	November 13, 2009	La Sagra	OAM	·	2.8 km	MPC · JPL
490605	2009 WK_{182}	—	November 23, 2009	Kitt Peak	Spacewatch	·	2.7 km	MPC · JPL
490606	2009 WN_{184}	—	October 22, 2009	Mount Lemmon	Mount Lemmon Survey	·	1.1 km	MPC · JPL
490607	2009 WO_{185}	—	October 24, 2009	Kitt Peak	Spacewatch	BRA	1.3 km	MPC · JPL
490608	2009 WJ_{186}	—	June 2, 2008	Mount Lemmon	Mount Lemmon Survey	L4	8.4 km	MPC · JPL
490609	2009 WT_{195}	—	November 20, 2009	Mount Lemmon	Mount Lemmon Survey	·	1.4 km	MPC · JPL
490610	2009 WF_{203}	—	October 17, 2009	Mount Lemmon	Mount Lemmon Survey	·	3.5 km	MPC · JPL
490611	2009 WU_{203}	—	November 16, 2009	Kitt Peak	Spacewatch	·	2.3 km	MPC · JPL
490612	2009 WX_{205}	—	October 22, 2009	Mount Lemmon	Mount Lemmon Survey	·	2.2 km	MPC · JPL
490613	2009 WQ_{207}	—	November 17, 2009	Kitt Peak	Spacewatch	NYS	760 m	MPC · JPL
490614	2009 WC_{212}	—	November 10, 2009	Kitt Peak	Spacewatch	·	1.8 km	MPC · JPL
490615	2009 XT_{15}	—	December 15, 2009	Mount Lemmon	Mount Lemmon Survey	·	3.8 km	MPC · JPL
490616	2009 XU_{24}	—	December 11, 2009	Mount Lemmon	Mount Lemmon Survey	·	2.9 km	MPC · JPL
490617	2009 YM_{1}	—	December 17, 2009	Kitt Peak	Spacewatch	HYG	2.8 km	MPC · JPL
490618	2009 YA_{3}	—	May 9, 2006	Mount Lemmon	Mount Lemmon Survey	EOS	1.8 km	MPC · JPL
490619	2009 YC_{19}	—	December 17, 2009	Kitt Peak	Spacewatch	·	1.0 km	MPC · JPL
490620	2009 YQ_{24}	—	December 18, 2009	Mount Lemmon	Mount Lemmon Survey	(5)	900 m	MPC · JPL
490621	2010 AC_{19}	—	September 11, 2005	Kitt Peak	Spacewatch	·	640 m	MPC · JPL
490622	2010 AV_{28}	—	November 10, 2009	Mount Lemmon	Mount Lemmon Survey	·	3.0 km	MPC · JPL
490623	2010 AZ_{32}	—	January 7, 2010	Kitt Peak	Spacewatch	·	650 m	MPC · JPL
490624	2010 AN_{53}	—	October 9, 2005	Kitt Peak	Spacewatch	·	600 m	MPC · JPL
490625	2010 AZ_{80}	—	January 12, 2010	Kitt Peak	Spacewatch	·	1.6 km	MPC · JPL
490626	2010 AY_{91}	—	January 8, 2010	WISE	WISE	DOR	2.2 km	MPC · JPL
490627	2010 BS_{3}	—	January 21, 2010	Nazaret	Muler, G.	·	1.4 km	MPC · JPL
490628 Chassigny	2010 BW_{4}	Chassigny	January 24, 2010	Nogales	J.-C. Merlin	(5)	970 m	MPC · JPL
490629	2010 BO_{81}	—	October 1, 2009	Mount Lemmon	Mount Lemmon Survey	·	3.9 km	MPC · JPL
490630	2010 BF_{122}	—	July 25, 2010	WISE	WISE	·	4.0 km	MPC · JPL
490631	2010 CF_{5}	—	February 8, 2010	Kitt Peak	Spacewatch	·	610 m	MPC · JPL
490632	2010 CN_{29}	—	February 9, 2010	Kitt Peak	Spacewatch	·	550 m	MPC · JPL
490633	2010 CV_{85}	—	January 6, 2010	Kitt Peak	Spacewatch	·	4.0 km	MPC · JPL
490634	2010 CA_{128}	—	February 7, 2010	La Sagra	OAM	·	2.0 km	MPC · JPL
490635	2010 CB_{139}	—	December 20, 2009	Mount Lemmon	Mount Lemmon Survey	·	840 m	MPC · JPL
490636	2010 DP	—	February 16, 2010	Mount Lemmon	Mount Lemmon Survey	AMO	700 m	MPC · JPL
490637	2010 DD_{60}	—	December 11, 2009	Mount Lemmon	Mount Lemmon Survey	·	5.1 km	MPC · JPL
490638	2010 DU_{74}	—	February 17, 2010	Kitt Peak	Spacewatch	(2076)	830 m	MPC · JPL
490639	2010 ED_{1}	—	December 11, 2009	Mount Lemmon	Mount Lemmon Survey	·	3.8 km	MPC · JPL
490640	2010 ED_{32}	—	March 4, 2010	Kitt Peak	Spacewatch	·	620 m	MPC · JPL
490641	2010 EJ_{68}	—	March 12, 2010	Mount Lemmon	Mount Lemmon Survey	·	670 m	MPC · JPL
490642	2010 EU_{76}	—	February 17, 2010	Kitt Peak	Spacewatch	·	540 m	MPC · JPL
490643	2010 EW_{78}	—	March 12, 2010	Mount Lemmon	Mount Lemmon Survey	·	590 m	MPC · JPL
490644	2010 EG_{94}	—	October 8, 2008	Kitt Peak	Spacewatch	·	650 m	MPC · JPL
490645	2010 ER_{123}	—	March 9, 2010	La Sagra	OAM	·	4.3 km	MPC · JPL
490646	2010 EO_{128}	—	March 12, 2010	Kitt Peak	Spacewatch	·	820 m	MPC · JPL
490647	2010 ES_{132}	—	March 12, 2010	Kitt Peak	Spacewatch	·	710 m	MPC · JPL
490648	2010 EC_{133}	—	March 13, 2010	Kitt Peak	Spacewatch	·	760 m	MPC · JPL
490649	2010 EU_{135}	—	March 13, 2010	Mount Lemmon	Mount Lemmon Survey	·	670 m	MPC · JPL
490650	2010 FX_{31}	—	March 16, 2010	WISE	WISE	PHO	2.6 km	MPC · JPL
490651	2010 FM_{47}	—	April 25, 2003	Kitt Peak	Spacewatch	·	970 m	MPC · JPL
490652	2010 FY_{86}	—	March 16, 2010	Mount Lemmon	Mount Lemmon Survey	·	590 m	MPC · JPL
490653	2010 FT_{99}	—	March 21, 2010	Kitt Peak	Spacewatch	·	820 m	MPC · JPL
490654	2010 FD_{101}	—	March 18, 2010	Kitt Peak	Spacewatch	·	680 m	MPC · JPL
490655	2010 GZ_{26}	—	April 5, 2010	Kitt Peak	Spacewatch	·	900 m	MPC · JPL
490656	2010 GA_{31}	—	April 4, 2010	Catalina	CSS	DOR	2.4 km	MPC · JPL
490657	2010 GQ_{66}	—	April 9, 2010	Mount Lemmon	Mount Lemmon Survey	·	850 m	MPC · JPL
490658	2010 GS_{108}	—	April 8, 2010	Kitt Peak	Spacewatch	V	640 m	MPC · JPL
490659	2010 GS_{111}	—	April 9, 2010	Mount Lemmon	Mount Lemmon Survey	·	650 m	MPC · JPL
490660	2010 GW_{117}	—	April 10, 2010	Mount Lemmon	Mount Lemmon Survey	·	1.1 km	MPC · JPL
490661	2010 GN_{132}	—	April 10, 2010	Kitt Peak	Spacewatch	·	1.8 km	MPC · JPL
490662	2010 HG_{43}	—	April 22, 2010	WISE	WISE	·	1.2 km	MPC · JPL
490663	2010 HH_{61}	—	April 26, 2010	WISE	WISE	·	1.6 km	MPC · JPL
490664	2010 HZ_{77}	—	April 10, 2010	Kitt Peak	Spacewatch	·	780 m	MPC · JPL
490665	2010 HH_{103}	—	May 1, 2003	Kitt Peak	Spacewatch	·	580 m	MPC · JPL
490666	2010 HU_{103}	—	January 26, 2006	Kitt Peak	Spacewatch	·	690 m	MPC · JPL
490667	2010 HF_{105}	—	April 20, 2010	Kitt Peak	Spacewatch	·	740 m	MPC · JPL
490668	2010 JK_{29}	—	May 3, 2010	Kitt Peak	Spacewatch	NYS	650 m	MPC · JPL
490669	2010 JN_{31}	—	May 5, 2010	Catalina	CSS	PHO	1.6 km	MPC · JPL
490670	2010 JX_{33}	—	April 8, 2010	Kitt Peak	Spacewatch	·	890 m	MPC · JPL
490671	2010 JE_{41}	—	March 12, 2010	Kitt Peak	Spacewatch	T_{j} (2.96) · 3:2	4.5 km	MPC · JPL
490672	2010 JU_{43}	—	April 9, 2010	Kitt Peak	Spacewatch	·	540 m	MPC · JPL
490673	2010 JW_{96}	—	May 11, 2010	WISE	WISE	·	1.8 km	MPC · JPL
490674	2010 JB_{113}	—	April 14, 2010	Kitt Peak	Spacewatch	PHO	1.4 km	MPC · JPL
490675	2010 JW_{148}	—	March 21, 2010	Mount Lemmon	Mount Lemmon Survey	·	1.8 km	MPC · JPL
490676	2010 JA_{156}	—	February 3, 2006	Mount Lemmon	Mount Lemmon Survey	·	780 m	MPC · JPL
490677	2010 JK_{163}	—	April 15, 2010	Catalina	CSS	·	1.4 km	MPC · JPL
490678	2010 JJ_{176}	—	May 9, 2010	Siding Spring	SSS	·	1.4 km	MPC · JPL
490679	2010 KO_{53}	—	May 23, 2010	WISE	WISE	LIX	4.1 km	MPC · JPL
490680	2010 KR_{84}	—	May 26, 2010	WISE	WISE	·	1.5 km	MPC · JPL
490681	2010 LJ_{8}	—	June 1, 2010	WISE	WISE	·	2.9 km	MPC · JPL
490682	2010 LT_{28}	—	June 6, 2010	WISE	WISE	·	3.7 km	MPC · JPL
490683	2010 LH_{34}	—	May 7, 2010	Catalina	CSS	·	800 m	MPC · JPL
490684	2010 LL_{34}	—	June 9, 2010	Catalina	CSS	APO	450 m	MPC · JPL
490685	2010 LB_{37}	—	June 6, 2010	WISE	WISE	(8737)	3.2 km	MPC · JPL
490686	2010 LY_{44}	—	June 7, 2010	WISE	WISE	·	1.9 km	MPC · JPL
490687	2010 LV_{113}	—	May 11, 2010	Mount Lemmon	Mount Lemmon Survey	·	1.4 km	MPC · JPL
490688	2010 MH_{17}	—	June 17, 2010	WISE	WISE	·	2.3 km	MPC · JPL
490689	2010 MG_{35}	—	June 21, 2010	WISE	WISE	·	2.1 km	MPC · JPL
490690	2010 MW_{65}	—	June 25, 2010	WISE	WISE	ADE	2.0 km	MPC · JPL
490691	2010 MN_{114}	—	June 21, 2010	Kitt Peak	Spacewatch	·	3.6 km	MPC · JPL
490692	2010 NG_{5}	—	July 6, 2010	Mount Lemmon	Mount Lemmon Survey	·	1.3 km	MPC · JPL
490693	2010 NV_{6}	—	July 5, 2010	Kitt Peak	Spacewatch	·	1.9 km	MPC · JPL
490694	2010 NU_{30}	—	July 7, 2010	WISE	WISE	·	3.0 km	MPC · JPL
490695	2010 OC_{24}	—	July 18, 2010	WISE	WISE	·	1.9 km	MPC · JPL
490696	2010 OE_{70}	—	July 25, 2010	WISE	WISE	·	2.4 km	MPC · JPL
490697	2010 OA_{71}	—	July 25, 2010	WISE	WISE	LIX	2.6 km	MPC · JPL
490698	2010 OV_{76}	—	November 25, 2005	Kitt Peak	Spacewatch	·	2.3 km	MPC · JPL
490699	2010 OW_{103}	—	May 6, 2010	Catalina	CSS	PHO	2.0 km	MPC · JPL
490700	2010 OM_{125}	—	July 31, 2010	WISE	WISE	·	1.8 km	MPC · JPL

== 490701–490800 ==
back to top

Designation			Discovery			Properties		Ref
Permanent	Provisional	Named after	Date	Site	Discoverer(s)	Category	Diam.	Ref
490701	2010 PH_{24}	—	August 5, 2010	La Sagra	OAM	MAS	720 m	MPC · JPL
490702	2010 PQ_{35}	—	August 5, 2010	WISE	WISE	·	2.9 km	MPC · JPL
490703	2010 PF_{41}	—	August 11, 2010	Kitt Peak	Spacewatch	·	1.3 km	MPC · JPL
490704	2010 PP_{57}	—	August 7, 2010	La Sagra	OAM	·	1.9 km	MPC · JPL
490705	2010 PT_{63}	—	August 5, 2010	La Sagra	OAM	V	780 m	MPC · JPL
490706	2010 PY_{79}	—	August 10, 2010	Kitt Peak	Spacewatch	·	1.1 km	MPC · JPL
490707	2010 QZ_{1}	—	August 21, 2010	WISE	WISE	·	3.3 km	MPC · JPL
490708	2010 QZ_{2}	—	August 20, 2010	La Sagra	OAM	·	2.5 km	MPC · JPL
490709	2010 RB_{10}	—	September 2, 2010	Mount Lemmon	Mount Lemmon Survey	·	1.1 km	MPC · JPL
490710	2010 RU_{18}	—	September 2, 2010	Mount Lemmon	Mount Lemmon Survey	H	500 m	MPC · JPL
490711	2010 RY_{18}	—	April 30, 2009	Kitt Peak	Spacewatch	JUN	1.1 km	MPC · JPL
490712	2010 RS_{25}	—	September 3, 2010	Mount Lemmon	Mount Lemmon Survey	·	1.0 km	MPC · JPL
490713	2010 RY_{26}	—	September 30, 2005	Mount Lemmon	Mount Lemmon Survey	·	1.2 km	MPC · JPL
490714	2010 RK_{40}	—	September 5, 2010	La Sagra	OAM	·	1.6 km	MPC · JPL
490715	2010 RE_{42}	—	September 16, 2003	Kitt Peak	Spacewatch	·	810 m	MPC · JPL
490716	2010 RN_{68}	—	September 6, 2010	La Sagra	OAM	·	2.9 km	MPC · JPL
490717	2010 RF_{81}	—	September 28, 2006	Catalina	CSS	·	1.7 km	MPC · JPL
490718	2010 RL_{82}	—	September 11, 2010	Siding Spring	SSS	·	380 m	MPC · JPL
490719	2010 RH_{87}	—	September 2, 2010	Mount Lemmon	Mount Lemmon Survey	·	1.3 km	MPC · JPL
490720	2010 RR_{104}	—	September 10, 2010	Kitt Peak	Spacewatch	GEF	1.0 km	MPC · JPL
490721	2010 RC_{109}	—	September 2, 2010	Socorro	LINEAR	H	510 m	MPC · JPL
490722	2010 RT_{112}	—	September 2, 2010	Mount Lemmon	Mount Lemmon Survey	EOS	1.6 km	MPC · JPL
490723	2010 RX_{120}	—	October 19, 2006	Kitt Peak	Spacewatch	·	1.5 km	MPC · JPL
490724	2010 RD_{123}	—	September 9, 2010	Kitt Peak	Spacewatch	EUN	960 m	MPC · JPL
490725	2010 RE_{123}	—	January 13, 2008	Kitt Peak	Spacewatch	·	650 m	MPC · JPL
490726	2010 RX_{125}	—	September 12, 2010	Kitt Peak	Spacewatch	·	1.6 km	MPC · JPL
490727	2010 RH_{140}	—	September 29, 2000	Kitt Peak	Spacewatch	·	510 m	MPC · JPL
490728	2010 RD_{142}	—	September 14, 2010	Kitt Peak	Spacewatch	·	2.0 km	MPC · JPL
490729	2010 RB_{149}	—	September 15, 2010	Kitt Peak	Spacewatch	VER	2.4 km	MPC · JPL
490730	2010 RC_{154}	—	September 15, 2010	Kitt Peak	Spacewatch	·	1.5 km	MPC · JPL
490731	2010 RE_{158}	—	September 1, 2010	Mount Lemmon	Mount Lemmon Survey	MAS	720 m	MPC · JPL
490732	2010 RS_{162}	—	September 4, 2010	Kitt Peak	Spacewatch	·	1.6 km	MPC · JPL
490733	2010 RQ_{167}	—	March 28, 2008	Mount Lemmon	Mount Lemmon Survey	·	2.8 km	MPC · JPL
490734	2010 RO_{174}	—	September 8, 2010	Kitt Peak	Spacewatch	·	2.7 km	MPC · JPL
490735	2010 RX_{174}	—	March 1, 2008	Kitt Peak	Spacewatch	·	1.6 km	MPC · JPL
490736	2010 RC_{175}	—	September 9, 2010	Kitt Peak	Spacewatch	·	1.8 km	MPC · JPL
490737	2010 RX_{177}	—	September 11, 2010	Kitt Peak	Spacewatch	MAR	960 m	MPC · JPL
490738	2010 SS_{4}	—	June 27, 2010	WISE	WISE	·	2.5 km	MPC · JPL
490739	2010 SU_{5}	—	September 16, 2010	Mount Lemmon	Mount Lemmon Survey	·	1.5 km	MPC · JPL
490740	2010 SV_{11}	—	November 25, 2005	Mount Lemmon	Mount Lemmon Survey	·	1.3 km	MPC · JPL
490741	2010 SX_{14}	—	September 12, 2010	Kitt Peak	Spacewatch	·	1.4 km	MPC · JPL
490742	2010 SW_{18}	—	April 3, 2008	Mount Lemmon	Mount Lemmon Survey	GEF	1.1 km	MPC · JPL
490743	2010 SV_{26}	—	September 29, 2010	Kitt Peak	Spacewatch	·	1.2 km	MPC · JPL
490744	2010 SG_{37}	—	September 4, 2010	La Sagra	OAM	RAF	1.1 km	MPC · JPL
490745	2010 SG_{39}	—	September 19, 2010	Kitt Peak	Spacewatch	(5)	1.1 km	MPC · JPL
490746	2010 TR_{4}	—	February 12, 2008	Kitt Peak	Spacewatch	·	930 m	MPC · JPL
490747	2010 TG_{15}	—	December 30, 2007	Kitt Peak	Spacewatch	·	1.4 km	MPC · JPL
490748	2010 TQ_{43}	—	April 4, 2008	Kitt Peak	Spacewatch	·	1.3 km	MPC · JPL
490749	2010 TR_{87}	—	October 17, 1995	Kitt Peak	Spacewatch	·	860 m	MPC · JPL
490750	2010 TA_{93}	—	September 18, 2003	Kitt Peak	Spacewatch	·	590 m	MPC · JPL
490751	2010 TG_{100}	—	April 6, 2008	Mount Lemmon	Mount Lemmon Survey	·	1.3 km	MPC · JPL
490752	2010 TE_{102}	—	October 3, 2006	Mount Lemmon	Mount Lemmon Survey	(5)	1.1 km	MPC · JPL
490753	2010 TL_{104}	—	February 2, 2008	Catalina	CSS	·	1.9 km	MPC · JPL
490754	2010 TQ_{119}	—	December 7, 1999	Socorro	LINEAR	·	2.4 km	MPC · JPL
490755	2010 TW_{150}	—	September 8, 2010	La Sagra	OAM	·	2.4 km	MPC · JPL
490756	2010 TW_{154}	—	September 2, 2010	Mount Lemmon	Mount Lemmon Survey	·	2.1 km	MPC · JPL
490757	2010 TN_{166}	—	October 7, 2010	Catalina	CSS	H	570 m	MPC · JPL
490758	2010 TB_{167}	—	March 9, 2008	Mount Lemmon	Mount Lemmon Survey	·	1.3 km	MPC · JPL
490759	2010 TE_{167}	—	December 27, 2002	Socorro	LINEAR	H	620 m	MPC · JPL
490760	2010 TD_{174}	—	September 18, 2010	Mount Lemmon	Mount Lemmon Survey	·	1.9 km	MPC · JPL
490761	2010 TX_{181}	—	October 8, 2010	Kitt Peak	Spacewatch	·	960 m	MPC · JPL
490762	2010 TZ_{187}	—	September 10, 2010	Kitt Peak	Spacewatch	·	2.4 km	MPC · JPL
490763	2010 TL_{192}	—	October 12, 2010	Mount Lemmon	Mount Lemmon Survey	L4	6.2 km	MPC · JPL
490764	2010 TM_{192}	—	October 16, 2009	Mount Lemmon	Mount Lemmon Survey	L4	8.3 km	MPC · JPL
490765	2010 TP_{192}	—	September 19, 2009	Kitt Peak	Spacewatch	L4	6.2 km	MPC · JPL
490766	2010 UC_{2}	—	October 17, 2010	Mount Lemmon	Mount Lemmon Survey	BRG	1.7 km	MPC · JPL
490767	2010 UV_{5}	—	November 19, 2006	Kitt Peak	Spacewatch	·	1.2 km	MPC · JPL
490768	2010 US_{6}	—	September 17, 2010	Mount Lemmon	Mount Lemmon Survey	·	1.7 km	MPC · JPL
490769	2010 UQ_{8}	—	March 31, 2009	Kitt Peak	Spacewatch	·	1.2 km	MPC · JPL
490770	2010 UH_{20}	—	September 17, 2010	Mount Lemmon	Mount Lemmon Survey	·	1.2 km	MPC · JPL
490771	2010 UR_{25}	—	October 28, 2010	Mount Lemmon	Mount Lemmon Survey	·	1.7 km	MPC · JPL
490772	2010 UO_{30}	—	October 29, 2010	Kitt Peak	Spacewatch	AGN	930 m	MPC · JPL
490773	2010 UL_{33}	—	October 12, 2010	Kitt Peak	Spacewatch	·	2.2 km	MPC · JPL
490774	2010 UL_{40}	—	November 12, 2006	Mount Lemmon	Mount Lemmon Survey	·	1.1 km	MPC · JPL
490775	2010 UR_{45}	—	October 13, 2010	Mount Lemmon	Mount Lemmon Survey	L4	7.1 km	MPC · JPL
490776	2010 UD_{50}	—	October 12, 2010	Mount Lemmon	Mount Lemmon Survey	·	1.1 km	MPC · JPL
490777	2010 UC_{53}	—	October 25, 2005	Kitt Peak	Spacewatch	·	1.9 km	MPC · JPL
490778	2010 UL_{56}	—	September 15, 2009	Kitt Peak	Spacewatch	L4	8.3 km	MPC · JPL
490779	2010 UL_{57}	—	October 29, 2010	Kitt Peak	Spacewatch	·	1.9 km	MPC · JPL
490780	2010 UQ_{59}	—	August 19, 2006	Kitt Peak	Spacewatch	NYS	910 m	MPC · JPL
490781	2010 UX_{67}	—	September 10, 2010	Mount Lemmon	Mount Lemmon Survey	·	1.1 km	MPC · JPL
490782	2010 UA_{70}	—	October 12, 2010	Mount Lemmon	Mount Lemmon Survey	·	1.7 km	MPC · JPL
490783	2010 UF_{70}	—	August 31, 2005	Palomar	NEAT	·	2.0 km	MPC · JPL
490784	2010 UQ_{77}	—	October 13, 2010	Mount Lemmon	Mount Lemmon Survey	·	1.6 km	MPC · JPL
490785	2010 UO_{81}	—	October 31, 2010	Mount Lemmon	Mount Lemmon Survey	L4	6.8 km	MPC · JPL
490786	2010 UK_{86}	—	October 19, 2010	Mount Lemmon	Mount Lemmon Survey	PAD	1.2 km	MPC · JPL
490787	2010 UA_{89}	—	October 19, 2006	Kitt Peak	Spacewatch	·	1.3 km	MPC · JPL
490788	2010 UY_{97}	—	November 9, 1996	Kitt Peak	Spacewatch	·	2.2 km	MPC · JPL
490789	2010 UQ_{101}	—	June 10, 2007	Kitt Peak	Spacewatch	H	400 m	MPC · JPL
490790	2010 UR_{105}	—	September 11, 2010	Mount Lemmon	Mount Lemmon Survey	V	520 m	MPC · JPL
490791	2010 VE_{1}	—	November 2, 2010	Haleakala	Pan-STARRS 1	AMO · critical	380 m	MPC · JPL
490792	2010 VF_{2}	—	October 12, 2010	Mount Lemmon	Mount Lemmon Survey	·	1.1 km	MPC · JPL
490793	2010 VJ_{12}	—	November 19, 2003	Kitt Peak	Spacewatch	·	820 m	MPC · JPL
490794	2010 VY_{23}	—	October 14, 2010	Mount Lemmon	Mount Lemmon Survey	·	1.2 km	MPC · JPL
490795	2010 VQ_{28}	—	November 2, 2010	Socorro	LINEAR	H	620 m	MPC · JPL
490796	2010 VY_{29}	—	November 2, 2010	La Sagra	OAM	·	1.4 km	MPC · JPL
490797	2010 VX_{38}	—	November 28, 1997	Kitt Peak	Spacewatch	·	2.3 km	MPC · JPL
490798	2010 VN_{44}	—	October 11, 2010	Mount Lemmon	Mount Lemmon Survey	·	1.5 km	MPC · JPL
490799	2010 VX_{56}	—	April 3, 2008	Kitt Peak	Spacewatch	·	1.5 km	MPC · JPL
490800	2010 VO_{64}	—	November 6, 2010	Mount Lemmon	Mount Lemmon Survey	·	2.3 km	MPC · JPL

== 490801–490900 ==
back to top

Designation			Discovery			Properties		Ref
Permanent	Provisional	Named after	Date	Site	Discoverer(s)	Category	Diam.	Ref
490801	2010 VH_{72}	—	October 12, 2010	Mount Lemmon	Mount Lemmon Survey	·	1.8 km	MPC · JPL
490802	2010 VL_{74}	—	April 24, 2009	Mount Lemmon	Mount Lemmon Survey	H	630 m	MPC · JPL
490803	2010 VD_{87}	—	October 28, 2005	Kitt Peak	Spacewatch	·	1.5 km	MPC · JPL
490804	2010 VN_{89}	—	September 28, 2009	Kitt Peak	Spacewatch	L4	6.0 km	MPC · JPL
490805	2010 VF_{90}	—	November 6, 2010	Kitt Peak	Spacewatch	·	2.2 km	MPC · JPL
490806	2010 VA_{91}	—	August 27, 2006	Kitt Peak	Spacewatch	·	770 m	MPC · JPL
490807	2010 VB_{105}	—	November 5, 2010	Mount Lemmon	Mount Lemmon Survey	·	1.8 km	MPC · JPL
490808	2010 VK_{112}	—	November 7, 2010	Kitt Peak	Spacewatch	·	2.4 km	MPC · JPL
490809	2010 VE_{115}	—	November 7, 2010	Mount Lemmon	Mount Lemmon Survey	L4 · ERY	6.7 km	MPC · JPL
490810	2010 VA_{117}	—	September 5, 2010	Mount Lemmon	Mount Lemmon Survey	·	1.4 km	MPC · JPL
490811	2010 VM_{124}	—	October 29, 2010	Mount Lemmon	Mount Lemmon Survey	HOF	2.4 km	MPC · JPL
490812	2010 VH_{127}	—	November 8, 2010	Kitt Peak	Spacewatch	·	690 m	MPC · JPL
490813	2010 VX_{127}	—	October 31, 2010	Kitt Peak	Spacewatch	·	1.2 km	MPC · JPL
490814	2010 VQ_{131}	—	September 30, 2010	Mount Lemmon	Mount Lemmon Survey	AGN	1.0 km	MPC · JPL
490815	2010 VE_{133}	—	November 1, 2010	Kitt Peak	Spacewatch	·	1.7 km	MPC · JPL
490816	2010 VH_{138}	—	August 12, 2010	Kitt Peak	Spacewatch	·	2.3 km	MPC · JPL
490817	2010 VF_{142}	—	November 6, 2010	Mount Lemmon	Mount Lemmon Survey	L4	7.7 km	MPC · JPL
490818	2010 VS_{145}	—	April 11, 2008	Mount Lemmon	Mount Lemmon Survey	·	1.9 km	MPC · JPL
490819	2010 VD_{147}	—	September 5, 2010	Mount Lemmon	Mount Lemmon Survey	·	1.6 km	MPC · JPL
490820	2010 VA_{148}	—	September 15, 2009	Kitt Peak	Spacewatch	L4 · ERY	6.1 km	MPC · JPL
490821	2010 VT_{157}	—	October 29, 2010	Mount Lemmon	Mount Lemmon Survey	WIT	920 m	MPC · JPL
490822	2010 VG_{160}	—	October 13, 2010	Mount Lemmon	Mount Lemmon Survey	·	2.0 km	MPC · JPL
490823	2010 VK_{164}	—	October 14, 2010	Mount Lemmon	Mount Lemmon Survey	MAR	1.1 km	MPC · JPL
490824	2010 VW_{164}	—	October 19, 2010	Mount Lemmon	Mount Lemmon Survey	H	390 m	MPC · JPL
490825	2010 VC_{176}	—	August 19, 2010	Kitt Peak	Spacewatch	·	1.2 km	MPC · JPL
490826	2010 VR_{197}	—	December 21, 2006	Kitt Peak	Spacewatch	PAD	1.5 km	MPC · JPL
490827	2010 VS_{197}	—	October 17, 2010	Mount Lemmon	Mount Lemmon Survey	·	1.9 km	MPC · JPL
490828	2010 VT_{197}	—	October 9, 2010	Mount Lemmon	Mount Lemmon Survey	H	650 m	MPC · JPL
490829	2010 VF_{199}	—	November 2, 2010	Mount Lemmon	Mount Lemmon Survey	·	1.9 km	MPC · JPL
490830	2010 VR_{207}	—	October 12, 2010	Mount Lemmon	Mount Lemmon Survey	·	1.7 km	MPC · JPL
490831	2010 VT_{215}	—	August 12, 2010	Kitt Peak	Spacewatch	·	940 m	MPC · JPL
490832	2010 VK_{217}	—	September 11, 2010	Mount Lemmon	Mount Lemmon Survey	·	2.6 km	MPC · JPL
490833	2010 VT_{217}	—	September 23, 2006	Kitt Peak	Spacewatch	MAS	690 m	MPC · JPL
490834	2010 VY_{224}	—	March 22, 2015	Mount Lemmon	Mount Lemmon Survey	L4	6.3 km	MPC · JPL
490835	2010 VA_{225}	—	September 7, 2008	Mount Lemmon	Mount Lemmon Survey	L4	7.9 km	MPC · JPL
490836	2010 WZ_{21}	—	October 27, 2005	Mount Lemmon	Mount Lemmon Survey	KOR	1.1 km	MPC · JPL
490837	2010 WY_{22}	—	September 25, 1995	Kitt Peak	Spacewatch	MAS	460 m	MPC · JPL
490838	2010 WD_{30}	—	October 1, 2005	Kitt Peak	Spacewatch	·	1.7 km	MPC · JPL
490839	2010 WD_{33}	—	September 20, 2009	Kitt Peak	Spacewatch	L4	6.9 km	MPC · JPL
490840	2010 WW_{34}	—	October 10, 2005	Anderson Mesa	LONEOS	·	1.9 km	MPC · JPL
490841	2010 WS_{51}	—	March 26, 2009	Mount Lemmon	Mount Lemmon Survey	H	510 m	MPC · JPL
490842	2010 WG_{62}	—	May 4, 2006	Siding Spring	SSS	H	640 m	MPC · JPL
490843	2010 WD_{70}	—	December 11, 2002	Socorro	LINEAR	H	640 m	MPC · JPL
490844	2010 WD_{74}	—	November 11, 2010	Mount Lemmon	Mount Lemmon Survey	·	1.9 km	MPC · JPL
490845	2010 XS	—	February 18, 2010	WISE	WISE	·	3.3 km	MPC · JPL
490846	2010 XY_{11}	—	December 1, 2010	Kitt Peak	Spacewatch	615	1.6 km	MPC · JPL
490847	2010 XT_{29}	—	September 18, 2009	Kitt Peak	Spacewatch	L4	6.8 km	MPC · JPL
490848	2010 XO_{37}	—	June 22, 2007	Mount Lemmon	Mount Lemmon Survey	H	700 m	MPC · JPL
490849	2010 XG_{48}	—	October 29, 2010	Catalina	CSS	H	500 m	MPC · JPL
490850	2010 XL_{55}	—	September 16, 2009	Kitt Peak	Spacewatch	L4	6.4 km	MPC · JPL
490851	2010 XY_{57}	—	November 27, 2010	Mount Lemmon	Mount Lemmon Survey	·	1.5 km	MPC · JPL
490852	2010 XO_{58}	—	November 3, 2010	Kitt Peak	Spacewatch	MRX	1.1 km	MPC · JPL
490853	2010 XB_{64}	—	October 24, 2001	Kitt Peak	Spacewatch	·	2.7 km	MPC · JPL
490854	2010 XB_{67}	—	December 4, 2010	Mount Lemmon	Mount Lemmon Survey	(5)	1.1 km	MPC · JPL
490855	2010 XO_{71}	—	April 30, 2008	Kitt Peak	Spacewatch	·	1.8 km	MPC · JPL
490856	2011 AQ	—	January 16, 2010	WISE	WISE	·	2.6 km	MPC · JPL
490857	2011 AR_{14}	—	November 11, 2010	Mount Lemmon	Mount Lemmon Survey	·	2.6 km	MPC · JPL
490858	2011 AA_{19}	—	February 27, 2006	Kitt Peak	Spacewatch	·	2.6 km	MPC · JPL
490859	2011 AL_{43}	—	July 20, 2009	Siding Spring	SSS	H	590 m	MPC · JPL
490860	2011 AP_{48}	—	January 27, 2007	Kitt Peak	Spacewatch	·	1.1 km	MPC · JPL
490861	2011 AP_{53}	—	December 8, 2010	Mount Lemmon	Mount Lemmon Survey	·	3.4 km	MPC · JPL
490862	2011 AT_{56}	—	December 8, 2010	Mount Lemmon	Mount Lemmon Survey	·	3.6 km	MPC · JPL
490863	2011 AV_{58}	—	October 2, 2009	Mount Lemmon	Mount Lemmon Survey	·	2.6 km	MPC · JPL
490864	2011 AF_{63}	—	December 9, 2010	Mount Lemmon	Mount Lemmon Survey	·	3.0 km	MPC · JPL
490865	2011 AE_{65}	—	December 14, 2010	Mount Lemmon	Mount Lemmon Survey	·	1.6 km	MPC · JPL
490866	2011 AK_{65}	—	January 14, 2011	Kitt Peak	Spacewatch	EOS	1.6 km	MPC · JPL
490867	2011 AB_{66}	—	October 7, 2005	Mauna Kea	A. Boattini	EOS	1.8 km	MPC · JPL
490868	2011 AU_{67}	—	February 22, 2007	Kitt Peak	Spacewatch	·	920 m	MPC · JPL
490869	2011 AV_{67}	—	February 1, 2006	Kitt Peak	Spacewatch	·	2.0 km	MPC · JPL
490870	2011 AQ_{69}	—	January 13, 2011	Mount Lemmon	Mount Lemmon Survey	·	2.3 km	MPC · JPL
490871	2011 BS	—	December 13, 2010	Mount Lemmon	Mount Lemmon Survey	EOS	1.5 km	MPC · JPL
490872	2011 BE_{5}	—	January 28, 2006	Kitt Peak	Spacewatch	·	2.4 km	MPC · JPL
490873	2011 BH_{6}	—	December 5, 2010	Mount Lemmon	Mount Lemmon Survey	·	2.2 km	MPC · JPL
490874	2011 BS_{6}	—	January 16, 2011	Mount Lemmon	Mount Lemmon Survey	·	2.8 km	MPC · JPL
490875	2011 BL_{10}	—	January 8, 2011	Mount Lemmon	Mount Lemmon Survey	H	640 m	MPC · JPL
490876	2011 BA_{11}	—	January 23, 2006	Mount Lemmon	Mount Lemmon Survey	·	2.6 km	MPC · JPL
490877	2011 BM_{13}	—	January 8, 2011	Mount Lemmon	Mount Lemmon Survey	·	1.2 km	MPC · JPL
490878	2011 BM_{19}	—	January 27, 2011	Kitt Peak	Spacewatch	·	2.8 km	MPC · JPL
490879	2011 BA_{21}	—	January 18, 2010	WISE	WISE	·	2.6 km	MPC · JPL
490880	2011 BU_{22}	—	October 14, 2010	Mount Lemmon	Mount Lemmon Survey	·	860 m	MPC · JPL
490881	2011 BK_{28}	—	December 18, 1999	Kitt Peak	Spacewatch	·	2.4 km	MPC · JPL
490882	2011 BN_{33}	—	January 17, 2010	WISE	WISE	·	2.8 km	MPC · JPL
490883	2011 BU_{39}	—	January 10, 2011	Catalina	CSS	THB	3.5 km	MPC · JPL
490884	2011 BQ_{43}	—	January 30, 2011	Piszkéstető	K. Sárneczky, Z. Kuli	·	620 m	MPC · JPL
490885	2011 BU_{43}	—	January 30, 2011	Piszkéstető	K. Sárneczky, Z. Kuli	·	2.8 km	MPC · JPL
490886	2011 BC_{45}	—	October 11, 2005	Kitt Peak	Spacewatch	·	950 m	MPC · JPL
490887	2011 BT_{52}	—	January 15, 2011	Mount Lemmon	Mount Lemmon Survey	·	1.9 km	MPC · JPL
490888	2011 BD_{53}	—	September 16, 2009	Siding Spring	SSS	T_{j} (2.98)	3.4 km	MPC · JPL
490889	2011 BC_{57}	—	October 13, 2004	Anderson Mesa	LONEOS	·	2.4 km	MPC · JPL
490890	2011 BC_{60}	—	December 8, 2010	Mount Lemmon	Mount Lemmon Survey	·	1.8 km	MPC · JPL
490891	2011 BB_{65}	—	January 29, 2011	Kitt Peak	Spacewatch	·	2.4 km	MPC · JPL
490892	2011 BT_{65}	—	January 4, 2011	Catalina	CSS	H	530 m	MPC · JPL
490893	2011 BS_{67}	—	October 26, 2009	Mount Lemmon	Mount Lemmon Survey	·	4.8 km	MPC · JPL
490894	2011 BX_{70}	—	January 9, 2010	WISE	WISE	·	2.8 km	MPC · JPL
490895	2011 BB_{84}	—	January 26, 2011	Mount Lemmon	Mount Lemmon Survey	·	2.2 km	MPC · JPL
490896	2011 BP_{85}	—	December 10, 2010	Mount Lemmon	Mount Lemmon Survey	THB	2.3 km	MPC · JPL
490897	2011 BH_{86}	—	January 27, 2011	Mount Lemmon	Mount Lemmon Survey	·	1.8 km	MPC · JPL
490898	2011 BU_{90}	—	February 24, 2010	WISE	WISE	·	6.6 km	MPC · JPL
490899	2011 BZ_{98}	—	February 4, 2005	Mount Lemmon	Mount Lemmon Survey	·	4.2 km	MPC · JPL
490900	2011 BK_{100}	—	February 12, 2011	Catalina	CSS	·	1.4 km	MPC · JPL

== 490901–491000 ==
back to top

Designation			Discovery			Properties		Ref
Permanent	Provisional	Named after	Date	Site	Discoverer(s)	Category	Diam.	Ref
490901	2011 BB_{105}	—	August 6, 2008	La Sagra	OAM	EOS	2.4 km	MPC · JPL
490902	2011 BN_{108}	—	February 5, 2011	Haleakala	Pan-STARRS 1	·	1.7 km	MPC · JPL
490903	2011 BC_{109}	—	February 10, 2011	Mount Lemmon	Mount Lemmon Survey	·	1.4 km	MPC · JPL
490904	2011 BM_{109}	—	June 19, 2007	Kitt Peak	Spacewatch	·	2.3 km	MPC · JPL
490905	2011 BJ_{111}	—	March 6, 2011	Mount Lemmon	Mount Lemmon Survey	EOS	1.6 km	MPC · JPL
490906	2011 BG_{116}	—	September 16, 2004	Kitt Peak	Spacewatch	AST	2.3 km	MPC · JPL
490907	2011 BL_{116}	—	January 9, 2011	Kitt Peak	Spacewatch	·	2.2 km	MPC · JPL
490908	2011 BS_{124}	—	January 21, 2010	WISE	WISE	·	3.7 km	MPC · JPL
490909	2011 BC_{125}	—	January 26, 2006	Kitt Peak	Spacewatch	·	1.6 km	MPC · JPL
490910	2011 BB_{129}	—	October 24, 2005	Kitt Peak	Spacewatch	·	1.1 km	MPC · JPL
490911	2011 BL_{134}	—	November 30, 2005	Kitt Peak	Spacewatch	KOR	1.3 km	MPC · JPL
490912	2011 BZ_{145}	—	January 14, 2011	Kitt Peak	Spacewatch	·	2.5 km	MPC · JPL
490913	2011 CO_{3}	—	October 4, 2006	Mount Lemmon	Mount Lemmon Survey	·	850 m	MPC · JPL
490914	2011 CX_{5}	—	October 3, 2005	Kitt Peak	Spacewatch	·	1.2 km	MPC · JPL
490915	2011 CY_{8}	—	September 20, 2003	Kitt Peak	Spacewatch	EOS	1.9 km	MPC · JPL
490916	2011 CZ_{13}	—	March 15, 2004	Kitt Peak	Spacewatch	MAS	520 m	MPC · JPL
490917	2011 CG_{18}	—	February 4, 2011	Catalina	CSS	·	2.3 km	MPC · JPL
490918	2011 CO_{21}	—	February 7, 2011	Mount Lemmon	Mount Lemmon Survey	·	2.7 km	MPC · JPL
490919	2011 CS_{30}	—	January 14, 2011	Kitt Peak	Spacewatch	·	2.0 km	MPC · JPL
490920	2011 CA_{40}	—	January 26, 2011	Mount Lemmon	Mount Lemmon Survey	EOS	1.9 km	MPC · JPL
490921	2011 CY_{43}	—	March 2, 2006	Kitt Peak	Spacewatch	EOS	1.4 km	MPC · JPL
490922	2011 CW_{47}	—	February 12, 2010	WISE	WISE	·	4.7 km	MPC · JPL
490923	2011 CR_{51}	—	January 26, 2011	Kitt Peak	Spacewatch	EOS	2.2 km	MPC · JPL
490924	2011 CK_{52}	—	September 16, 2003	Kitt Peak	Spacewatch	·	720 m	MPC · JPL
490925	2011 CH_{53}	—	February 24, 2006	Kitt Peak	Spacewatch	·	2.1 km	MPC · JPL
490926	2011 CP_{57}	—	November 22, 2009	Kitt Peak	Spacewatch	·	2.4 km	MPC · JPL
490927	2011 CK_{59}	—	December 10, 2010	Mount Lemmon	Mount Lemmon Survey	·	560 m	MPC · JPL
490928	2011 CT_{60}	—	October 21, 2009	Catalina	CSS	·	3.2 km	MPC · JPL
490929	2011 CN_{61}	—	August 7, 2008	Kitt Peak	Spacewatch	·	1.8 km	MPC · JPL
490930	2011 CA_{62}	—	February 8, 2011	Mount Lemmon	Mount Lemmon Survey	·	570 m	MPC · JPL
490931	2011 CT_{62}	—	January 30, 2011	Mount Lemmon	Mount Lemmon Survey	EOS	1.8 km	MPC · JPL
490932	2011 CS_{64}	—	January 30, 2011	Mount Lemmon	Mount Lemmon Survey	EOS	1.7 km	MPC · JPL
490933	2011 CN_{66}	—	January 13, 2011	Mount Lemmon	Mount Lemmon Survey	·	2.9 km	MPC · JPL
490934	2011 CD_{74}	—	March 25, 2006	Catalina	CSS	·	4.6 km	MPC · JPL
490935	2011 CJ_{78}	—	February 10, 2011	Mount Lemmon	Mount Lemmon Survey	·	1.7 km	MPC · JPL
490936	2011 CG_{81}	—	January 8, 2011	Mount Lemmon	Mount Lemmon Survey	·	2.2 km	MPC · JPL
490937	2011 CS_{82}	—	March 25, 2006	Kitt Peak	Spacewatch	THM	2.0 km	MPC · JPL
490938	2011 CL_{85}	—	February 6, 2011	Catalina	CSS	·	2.9 km	MPC · JPL
490939	2011 CM_{85}	—	February 25, 2011	Mount Lemmon	Mount Lemmon Survey	·	1.5 km	MPC · JPL
490940	2011 CV_{87}	—	November 11, 2004	Socorro	LINEAR	T_{j} (2.94)	2.9 km	MPC · JPL
490941	2011 CC_{90}	—	February 10, 2011	Mount Lemmon	Mount Lemmon Survey	EOS	1.7 km	MPC · JPL
490942	2011 CJ_{90}	—	September 21, 2003	Kitt Peak	Spacewatch	VER	2.2 km	MPC · JPL
490943	2011 CX_{90}	—	February 12, 2011	Mount Lemmon	Mount Lemmon Survey	NAE	1.9 km	MPC · JPL
490944	2011 CF_{91}	—	January 28, 2011	Kitt Peak	Spacewatch	·	2.2 km	MPC · JPL
490945	2011 CQ_{95}	—	February 2, 2010	WISE	WISE	EOS	1.4 km	MPC · JPL
490946	2011 CP_{96}	—	March 2, 2011	Mount Lemmon	Mount Lemmon Survey	·	640 m	MPC · JPL
490947	2011 CV_{97}	—	February 5, 2011	Haleakala	Pan-STARRS 1	(43176)	2.6 km	MPC · JPL
490948	2011 CO_{98}	—	November 10, 2009	Kitt Peak	Spacewatch	·	6.0 km	MPC · JPL
490949	2011 CU_{102}	—	September 28, 2008	Mount Lemmon	Mount Lemmon Survey	·	2.8 km	MPC · JPL
490950	2011 CX_{105}	—	February 12, 2011	Mount Lemmon	Mount Lemmon Survey	·	2.1 km	MPC · JPL
490951	2011 CV_{106}	—	June 15, 2007	Kitt Peak	Spacewatch	·	2.1 km	MPC · JPL
490952	2011 CR_{112}	—	March 6, 2011	Mount Lemmon	Mount Lemmon Survey	·	1.5 km	MPC · JPL
490953	2011 CY_{114}	—	February 10, 2011	Mount Lemmon	Mount Lemmon Survey	·	1.4 km	MPC · JPL
490954	2011 DO_{12}	—	November 16, 2009	La Sagra	OAM	·	3.2 km	MPC · JPL
490955	2011 DF_{14}	—	February 8, 2011	Mount Lemmon	Mount Lemmon Survey	EOS	1.6 km	MPC · JPL
490956	2011 DG_{14}	—	February 8, 2011	Mount Lemmon	Mount Lemmon Survey	·	2.0 km	MPC · JPL
490957	2011 DA_{15}	—	February 4, 2011	Catalina	CSS	·	2.8 km	MPC · JPL
490958	2011 DC_{20}	—	September 28, 2009	Kitt Peak	Spacewatch	·	2.5 km	MPC · JPL
490959	2011 DO_{27}	—	February 8, 2011	Mount Lemmon	Mount Lemmon Survey	THM	1.7 km	MPC · JPL
490960	2011 DQ_{30}	—	February 26, 2011	Catalina	CSS	·	3.1 km	MPC · JPL
490961	2011 DE_{31}	—	January 28, 2011	Kitt Peak	Spacewatch	·	2.9 km	MPC · JPL
490962	2011 DN_{31}	—	May 3, 2006	Catalina	CSS	·	2.9 km	MPC · JPL
490963	2011 DS_{36}	—	September 10, 2007	Mount Lemmon	Mount Lemmon Survey	·	2.3 km	MPC · JPL
490964	2011 DX_{36}	—	June 21, 2007	Mount Lemmon	Mount Lemmon Survey	·	2.0 km	MPC · JPL
490965	2011 DC_{38}	—	January 26, 2011	Mount Lemmon	Mount Lemmon Survey	·	1.2 km	MPC · JPL
490966	2011 DT_{46}	—	April 24, 2006	Kitt Peak	Spacewatch	THM	1.9 km	MPC · JPL
490967	2011 DG_{51}	—	February 26, 2011	Catalina	CSS	·	3.2 km	MPC · JPL
490968	2011 EL_{5}	—	March 1, 2011	Mount Lemmon	Mount Lemmon Survey	·	2.8 km	MPC · JPL
490969	2011 EV_{6}	—	July 14, 2009	Kitt Peak	Spacewatch	BAP	780 m	MPC · JPL
490970	2011 EA_{9}	—	January 26, 2010	WISE	WISE	·	3.1 km	MPC · JPL
490971	2011 EH_{9}	—	February 22, 2011	Kitt Peak	Spacewatch	·	2.6 km	MPC · JPL
490972	2011 ES_{27}	—	March 6, 2011	Mount Lemmon	Mount Lemmon Survey	·	2.9 km	MPC · JPL
490973	2011 EH_{31}	—	March 5, 2011	Catalina	CSS	·	4.1 km	MPC · JPL
490974	2011 EZ_{35}	—	February 26, 2011	Kitt Peak	Spacewatch	·	2.8 km	MPC · JPL
490975	2011 EL_{58}	—	March 12, 2011	Mount Lemmon	Mount Lemmon Survey	·	2.9 km	MPC · JPL
490976	2011 EW_{61}	—	November 20, 2009	Mount Lemmon	Mount Lemmon Survey	·	2.8 km	MPC · JPL
490977	2011 EK_{72}	—	March 11, 2011	Kitt Peak	Spacewatch	HYG	2.3 km	MPC · JPL
490978	2011 EE_{73}	—	July 12, 2007	La Sagra	OAM	·	3.0 km	MPC · JPL
490979	2011 EZ_{81}	—	February 25, 2011	Kitt Peak	Spacewatch	LIX	3.0 km	MPC · JPL
490980	2011 EW_{83}	—	February 4, 2005	Mount Lemmon	Mount Lemmon Survey	·	2.6 km	MPC · JPL
490981	2011 EN_{85}	—	June 13, 2012	Haleakala	Pan-STARRS 1	·	2.6 km	MPC · JPL
490982	2011 FA_{2}	—	November 9, 2009	Mount Lemmon	Mount Lemmon Survey	·	2.7 km	MPC · JPL
490983	2011 FV_{21}	—	March 26, 2011	Mount Lemmon	Mount Lemmon Survey	·	3.5 km	MPC · JPL
490984	2011 FE_{22}	—	February 25, 2010	WISE	WISE	·	2.7 km	MPC · JPL
490985	2011 FG_{27}	—	April 24, 2006	Kitt Peak	Spacewatch	·	3.1 km	MPC · JPL
490986	2011 FN_{27}	—	April 9, 2010	WISE	WISE	·	3.7 km	MPC · JPL
490987	2011 FO_{52}	—	October 9, 2004	Kitt Peak	Spacewatch	AST	1.8 km	MPC · JPL
490988	2011 FV_{75}	—	March 1, 2011	Mount Lemmon	Mount Lemmon Survey	THM	2.0 km	MPC · JPL
490989	2011 FM_{103}	—	September 10, 2007	Mount Lemmon	Mount Lemmon Survey	·	3.1 km	MPC · JPL
490990	2011 FU_{103}	—	February 27, 2010	WISE	WISE	·	2.9 km	MPC · JPL
490991	2011 FU_{108}	—	December 24, 2006	Kitt Peak	Spacewatch	NYS	950 m	MPC · JPL
490992	2011 FK_{126}	—	April 3, 2011	Haleakala	Pan-STARRS 1	EOS	1.9 km	MPC · JPL
490993	2011 FS_{133}	—	January 28, 2011	Mount Lemmon	Mount Lemmon Survey	·	2.4 km	MPC · JPL
490994	2011 FJ_{143}	—	November 23, 2006	Mount Lemmon	Mount Lemmon Survey	·	860 m	MPC · JPL
490995	2011 FK_{147}	—	September 29, 2009	Mount Lemmon	Mount Lemmon Survey	·	2.4 km	MPC · JPL
490996	2011 FR_{152}	—	January 30, 2006	Kitt Peak	Spacewatch	AGN	950 m	MPC · JPL
490997	2011 FD_{154}	—	February 25, 2011	Kitt Peak	Spacewatch	·	1.6 km	MPC · JPL
490998	2011 FC_{156}	—	March 9, 2011	Mount Lemmon	Mount Lemmon Survey	·	2.5 km	MPC · JPL
490999	2011 GZ_{4}	—	April 1, 2011	Mount Lemmon	Mount Lemmon Survey	·	4.1 km	MPC · JPL
491000	2011 GL_{7}	—	September 10, 2007	Kitt Peak	Spacewatch	·	2.8 km	MPC · JPL

back to top

== Meaning of names ==
As minor planet discoveries are confirmed, they are given a permanent number by the IAU's Minor Planet Center (MPC), and the discoverers can then submit names for them, following the IAU's naming conventions. The list below concerns those minor planets in the specified number-range that have received names, and explains the meanings of those names.

Official naming citations of newly named small Solar System bodies are approved and published in a bulletin by IAU's Working Group for Small Bodies Nomenclature (WGSBN). Before May 2021, citations were published in MPC's Minor Planet Circulars for many decades. Recent citations can also be found on the JPL Small-Body Database (SBDB). Until his death in 2016, German astronomer Lutz D. Schmadel compiled these citations into the Dictionary of Minor Planet Names (DMP) and regularly updated the collection.

Based on Paul Herget's The Names of the Minor Planets, Schmadel also researched the unclear origin of numerous asteroids, most of which had been named prior to World War II. This article incorporates text from this source, which is in the public domain: SBDB New namings may only be added to this list below after official publication as the preannouncement of names is condemned. The WGSBN publishes a comprehensive guideline for the naming rules of non-cometary small Solar System bodies.

Named minor planet	Provisional	This minor planet was named for...	Ref · Catalog
490628 Chassigny	2010 BW_{4}	Chassigny is a commune in the Haute-Marne department of eastern France, about 50 km south of Chaumont. It is well known for the fall of the Chassigny meteorite on 1815 October 3, a rare type of meteorite now proved to be from Mars.	IAU · 490628
