= Chassigny =

Chassigny may refer to:

- Chassigny (meteorite), a Martian meteorite that fell in 1815
- Chassigny, Haute-Marne, a village and commune in north-eastern France
- Chassigny-sous-Dun, a commune in central France
