= Chassigny (meteorite) =

1815 meteorite impact in north-eastern France

Chassigny meteorite
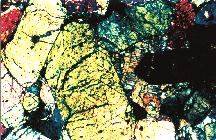
- Thin section of Chassigny under cross-polarized light (JPL)
- Type: Achondrite
- Class: Martian meteorite
- Group: Chassignite
- Parent body: Mars
- Country: France
- Region: Chassigny, Haute-Marne
- Coordinates: 47°43′N 5°23′E
- Fall date: 1815-10-03
- Related media on Wikimedia Commons

Chassigny is a Martian meteorite which fell on October 3, 1815, at approximately 8:00 am, in Chassigny, north-eastern France. Chassigny is the meteorite for which the chassignites are named and gives rise to the "C" in the name of the SNC group of meteorites. Chassigny is an olivine cumulate rock (dunite). It consists almost entirely of olivine with intercumulus pyroxene, feldspar, and oxides. It was the only known chassignite until NWA2737 was found in the Moroccan Sahara in northwest Africa.

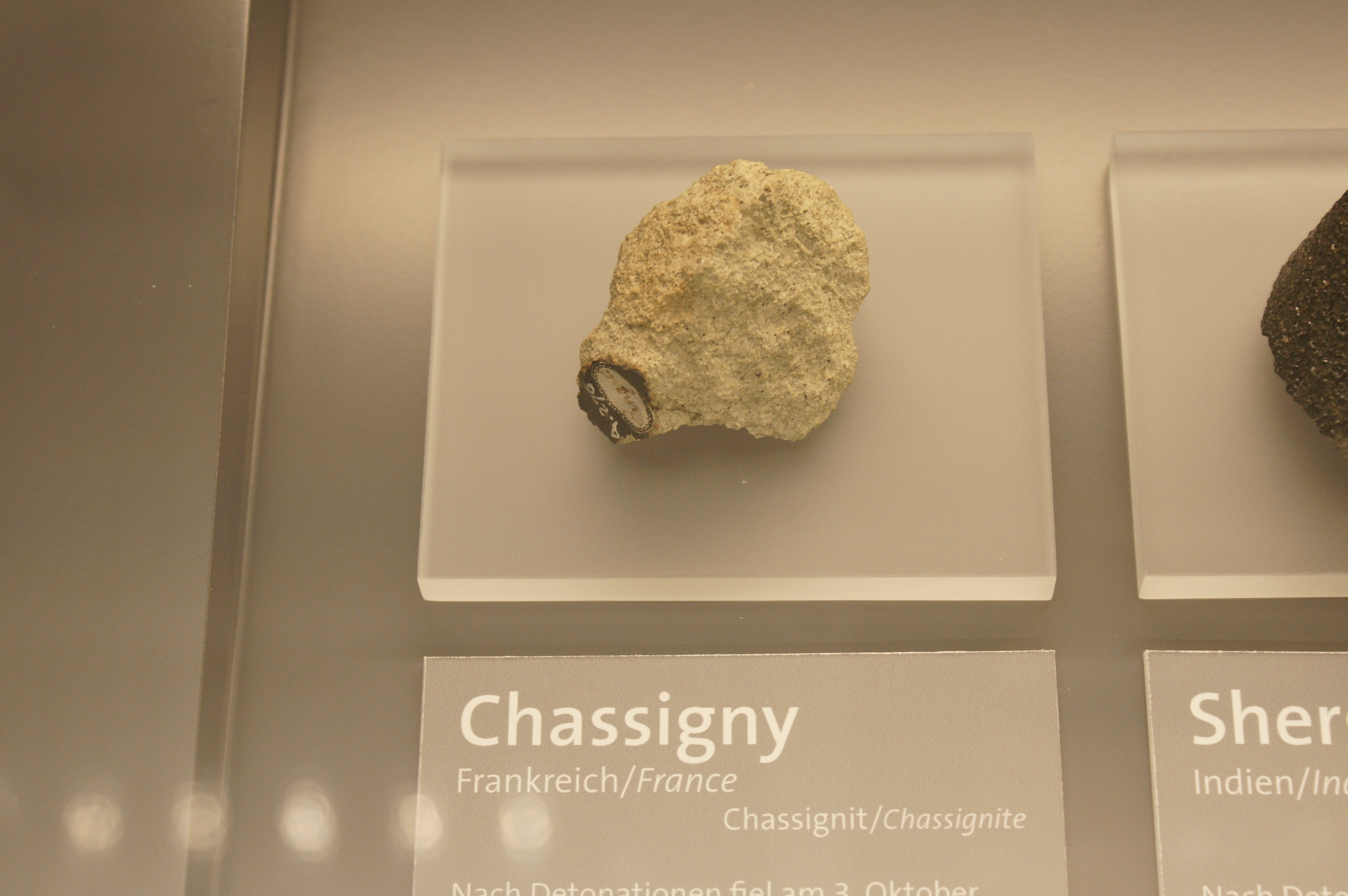
Second-largest fragment of Chassigny meteorite

Chassigny is particularly important because, unlike most SNCs, its noble gas composition differs from that in the current Martian atmosphere. These differences are presumably due to its cumulate (mantle-derived) nature.

== See also ==
- Glossary of meteoritics
- Meteorite falls
