= Chassigny, Haute-Marne =

Chassigny
- Commune
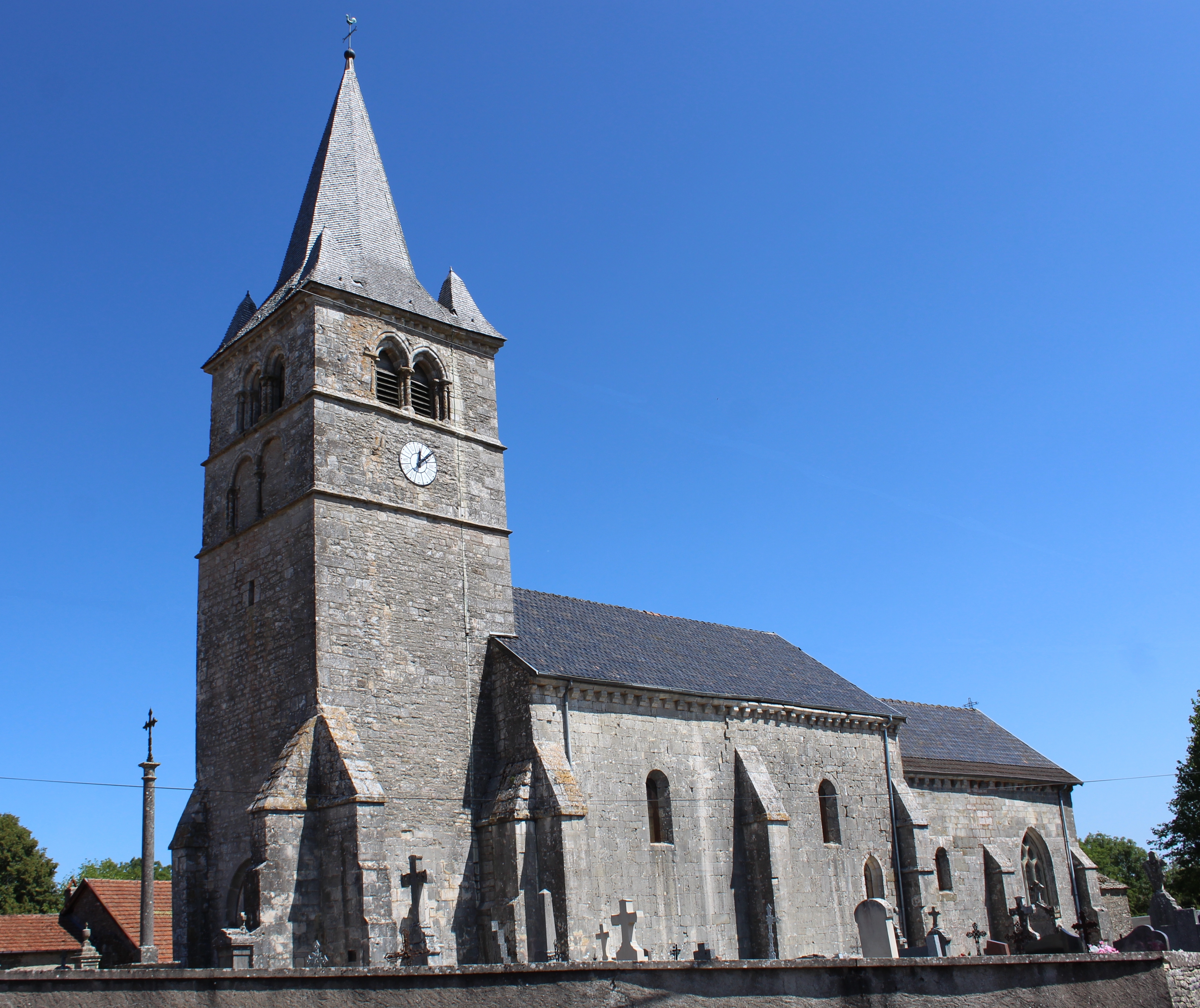
- The church in Chassigny
- Location of Chassigny
- Location within France Location within Grand Est
- Coordinates: 47°42′45″N 5°22′47″E
- Country: France
- Region: Grand Est
- Department: Haute-Marne
- Arrondissement: Langres
- Canton: Villegusien-le-Lac
- Intercommunality: Auberive Vingeanne et Montsaugeonnais

Government
  - Mayor (2020–2026): René Mechet
- Area^{1}: 15.89 km^{2} (6.14 sq mi)
- Elevation: 323 m (1,060 ft)
- Population (2023): 243
  - Density: 15.3/km^{2} (39.6/sq mi)
- Time zone: UTC+01:00 (CET)
  - Summer (DST): UTC+02:00 (CEST)
- INSEE/Postal code: 52113 /52190
- ^{1} French Land Register data, which excludes lakes, ponds, glaciers > 1 km^{2} (0.386 sq mi or 247 acres) and river estuaries.

Chassigny (French pronunciation: [ʃasiɲi]) is a commune in the Haute-Marne department in north-eastern France. It is known for the Chassigny meteorite.

== Demographics ==
Historical population
Year	Pop.	±% p.a.
1968	329	—
1975	313	−0.71%
1982	272	−1.99%
1990	254	−0.85%
1999	267	+0.56%
2007	257	−0.48%
2012	224	−2.71%
2017	253	+2.46%
2023	243	−0.67%
Source: INSEE

== See also ==
- Communes of the Haute-Marne department
