= List of Martian meteorites =

This is an incomplete list of Martian meteorites i.e. meteorites that have been identified as having originated from Mars.

As of September 2020, 277 meteorites had been classified as Martian, less than half a percent of the 72,000 meteorites that have been classified. On 17 October 2013, NASA reported, based on analysis of argon in the Martian atmosphere by the Mars Curiosity rover, that certain meteorites found on Earth previously only thought to be from Mars, could now be confirmed as from Mars. The list does not include meteorites found on Mars by the various rovers.

== List ==
Meteorite	Found	Mass (g)	Notes
Allan Hills 77005	1977-12-29	482.5	First Antarctic find.
Allan Hills 84001	1984	1939.9	Orthopyroxenite, 4.091 billion years old, is believed to be the oldest Martian meteorite.
Chassigny	1815-10-03	4000	Mainly olivine with intercumulous pyroxene, feldspar, and oxides.
Dar al Gani 476	1996-2000	2015	
Dar al Gani 489	1996-2000	2146	
Dar al Gani 670	1996-2000	1619	
Dar al Gani 735	1996-2000	588	
Dar al Gani 876	1996-2000	6.2	
Dar al Gani 975	1996-2000	27.6	
Dar al Gani 1037	1996-2000	4012	
Dar al Gani 1051	1996-2000	40.1	
Dhofar 019	2000-2010	1056	
Dhofar 378	2000-2001	15	
Dhofar 1668	2000-2010	6.1	
Dhofar 1674	2000-2010	49.2	
Dhofar unnamed	2000-2001	209.1	
Elephant Moraine 79001 A & B	1980	7942	Has two different lithologies in contact.
Governador Valadares	1958	158	
Grove Mountains 020090	2002	7.54	Smallest.
Grove Mountains 99027	2000	10	Second smallest.
Jiddat al Harasis 479	2008	553	
Ksar Ghilane 002	2010	538	
Lafayette	1931	800	
LAR 06319	2007	78.6	
LEW 88516	1988	13.2	
Los Angeles	1999-10-30	452.6 and 245.4	
MIL 03346	2003-2009	715	
MIL 090030	2003-2009	453	
MIL 090032	2003-2009	532	
MIL 090136	2003-2009	171	
Nakhla	1911-04-28		Shows signs of aqueous processes on Mars.
Northwest Africa 480	2000-2001	28	
Northwest Africa 817	2000	104	
Northwest Africa 856	2001	320	
Northwest Africa 998	2001	456	
Northwest Africa 1068	2001-2004	577	
Northwest Africa 1110	2001-2004	118	
Northwest Africa 1183	2001-2004	140	
Northwest Africa 1195	2002	315	
Northwest Africa 13187	2019	1600	
Northwest Africa 1460	2000-2001	70	
Northwest Africa 1669	2001	35.9	
Northwest Africa 16788	2023	24670	
Northwest Africa 1775	2001-2004	25	
Northwest Africa 1950	2001	797	
Northwest Africa 2046	2003	63	
Northwest Africa 2626	2004	31.1	
Northwest Africa 2646	2004	30.7	
Northwest Africa 2373	2001-2004	18	
Northwest Africa 2737	2000	611	
Northwest Africa 2800	2007	686	
Northwest Africa 2969	2001-2004	12	
Northwest Africa 2975	2005-2010	70.1	
Northwest Africa 2986	2005-2010	201	
Northwest Africa 2987	2005-2010	82	
Northwest Africa 2990	2007-2011	363	
Northwest Africa 3171	2004	506	
Northwest Africa 4222	2006	16.55	
Northwest Africa 4468	2006	675	
Northwest Africa 4480	2006	13	
Northwest Africa 4527	2006	10.06	
Northwest Africa 4766	2005-2010	225	
Northwest Africa 4783	2005-2010	120	
Northwest Africa 4797	2001	15	
Northwest Africa 4857	2005-2010	24	
Northwest Africa 4864	2005-2010	94	
Northwest Africa 4878	2005-2010	130	
Northwest Africa 4880	2005-2010	81.6	
Northwest Africa 4925	2006	282.3	
Northwest Africa 4930	2005-2010	117.5	
Northwest Africa 5029	2003	14.67	
Northwest Africa 5140	2005-2010	7.5	
Northwest Africa 5214	2005-2010	50.7	
Northwest Africa 5219	2005-2010	60	
Northwest Africa 5298	2008	445	
Northwest Africa 5313	2005-2010	5.3	
Northwest Africa 5366	2005-2010	39.6	
Northwest Africa 5718	2006	90.5	
Northwest Africa 5789	2009	49	
Northwest Africa 5790	2008-2009	145	
Northwest Africa 5960	2007-2011	147	
Northwest Africa 5990	2009	59	
Northwest Africa 6148	2008-2009	280	
Northwest Africa 6162	2010	89	
Northwest Africa 6234	2007-2011	55.7	
Northwest Africa 6342	2010	72.2	
Northwest Africa 6710	2007-2011	74.4	
Northwest Africa 6963	2011	8000	
Northwest Africa 7032	2011	85	
Northwest Africa 7034	2011	320	2.1 billion years old, second oldest Martian meteorite.
Northwest Africa 7042	2011	3033	
Northwest Africa 7182	2005-2010	17	
Northwest Africa 7257	2011	180	
Northwest Africa 7258	2011	310	
Northwest Africa 7272	2011	58.7	
Northwest Africa 7320	2011	52	
Northwest Africa 7397	2012	2130	
Northwest Africa 7500	2012	2040	
Northwest Africa 7533	2012	81	Probable pair with NWA 7034
RBT 04261	2004	78.8	
RBT 04262	2004	204.6	
QUE 94201	1994	12.0	
Sayh al Uhaymir 005	1999-2001	1344	
Sayh al Uhaymir 008	1999-2001	8579	
Sayh al Uhaymir 051	1999-2001	436	
Sayh al Uhaymir 060	1999-2001	42	
Sayh al Uhaymir 090	1999-2001	95	
Sayh al Uhaymir 094	1999-2001	223	
Sayh al Uhaymir 120	1999-2001	75	
Sayh al Uhaymir 125	1999-2001	32	
Sayh al Uhaymir 130	1999-2001	279	
Sayh al Uhaymir 150	1999-2001	108	
Shergotty	1865-08-25	5000	Mostly pyroxene; thought to have undergone preterrestrial aqueous alteration.
Tissint	2011-07-18	12000	Signs of elements being carried into cracks by water while on Mars.
YA 1075	1999	55	
Yamato 000027	1998-2000	9.7	
Yamato 000047	1998-2000	5.3	
Yamato 000097	1998-2000	24.5	
Yamato 000593	2000	13700	Second largest
Yamato 000749	2000	1283	
Yamato 000802	2000	22	
Yamato 793605	1979	16	
Yamato 980459	1998	82.5	
Yamato 980497	1998	8.7	
Yamato 984028	1998-2000	12.3	
Zagami	1962	18000	Largest.

== See also ==
- Glossary of meteoritics
- List of meteorites on Mars
- List of lunar meteorites

== Notes ==
Where multiple meteorites are listed, they are believed to be pieces of the same original body. The mass shown is the total recovered.

Abbreviations:

- Antarctica locations, numbered:
  - ALH - Allan Hills
  - LAR - Larkman Nunatak
  - LEW - Lewis Cliff
  - MIL - Miller Range
  - QUE - Queen Alexandra Range
  - RBT - Roberts Massif
  - YA - Yamato Mountains
- Chassigny - Chassigny, Haute-Marne, France
- Desert locations, numbered:
  - DaG - Dar al Gani, Al Jufrah, Libya
  - Dhofar - Zufar, Oman
  - NWA - Northwest Africa meteorite (mainly Mali, Algeria, Morocco, Mauritania and Western Sahara)
  - SaU - Sayh al Uhaymir, Oman
- Nakhla - El Nakhla El Bahariya, Abu Hummus, Beheira Governorate, Egypt
- Shergotty - Shergotty, Gaya district, Bihar, India
- Tissint - Tissint, Oued Drâa valley, East of Tata, Morocco
