= Corinto (crater) =

Impact crater on Mars

Crater characteristics
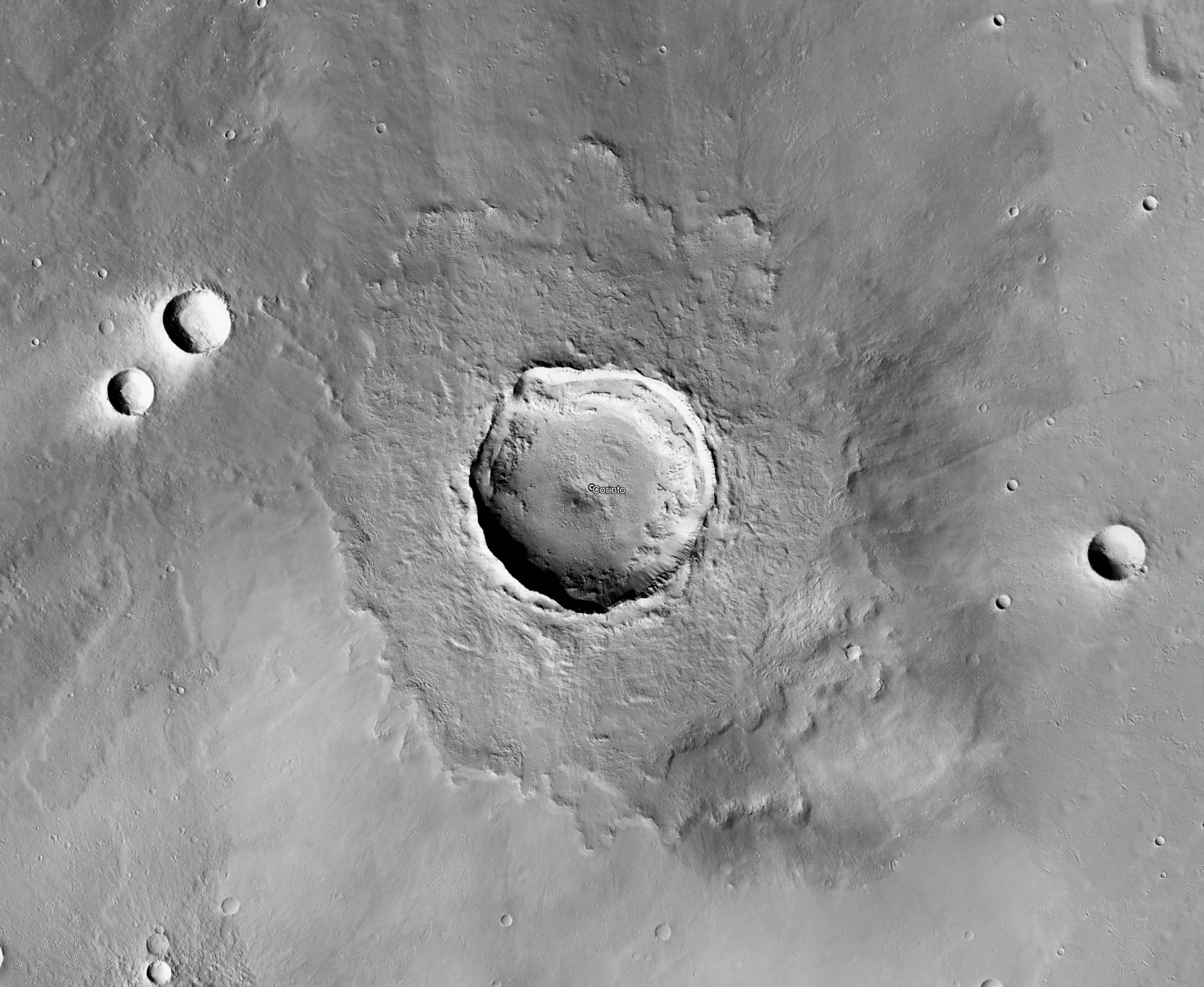
- Mosaic image from the Mars Reconnaissance Orbiter (MRO) of Corinto crater taken by the HiRISE Context Camera (CTX)
- Region: Elysium Planitia
- Coordinates: 141.72°E, 16.95°N
- Diameter: ~13.9 km
- Depth: ~1 km

Corinto crater is a well-preserved impact crater located on Elysium Planitia, Mars. It is a fresh, young crater has a diameter of 13.9 kilometers and a depth of 1 kilometers making it one of the largest craters of its age. The water or ice-rich rock it had formed in formed from basaltic flows during the Amazonian period of Martian history.

It has one most extensive ray systems of any known crater and has one of the most secondary craters produced. Some of the ejecta may have been blasted into space and land on Earth as meteorites of which there are a few candidates. There crater is covered by a doubled layered blanket of impact ejecta that appears as a butterfly-shape with a V-shape notch.

== Morphology ==
The crater has a general diameter of about 13.9 km however it is slightly elliptical with the crater being 13.46 km in diameter in the northeast–southwest direction and about 13.92 km in the northwest–southeast direction. It has a depth of around 1 km. There are a large number small, semi-circular and elongated pits located on the crater floor that range in size from less than 14–350 meters averaging to around 68 m. The largest of these pits tend towards the center of the crater. These pits do not have rims or any obvious impact ejecta. The pits seem to originate from a non-explosive event although it is possible that they may have formed due to the percolation of melt material into fragmented rock, or the escape of gases after the impact event.

The crater has a steep rim and has a height of around 75 meters. It has a 2.2 km long depression located at the center of the crater with a depth of 100 meters. The central depression does not have a rim.

=== Ejecta layer ===
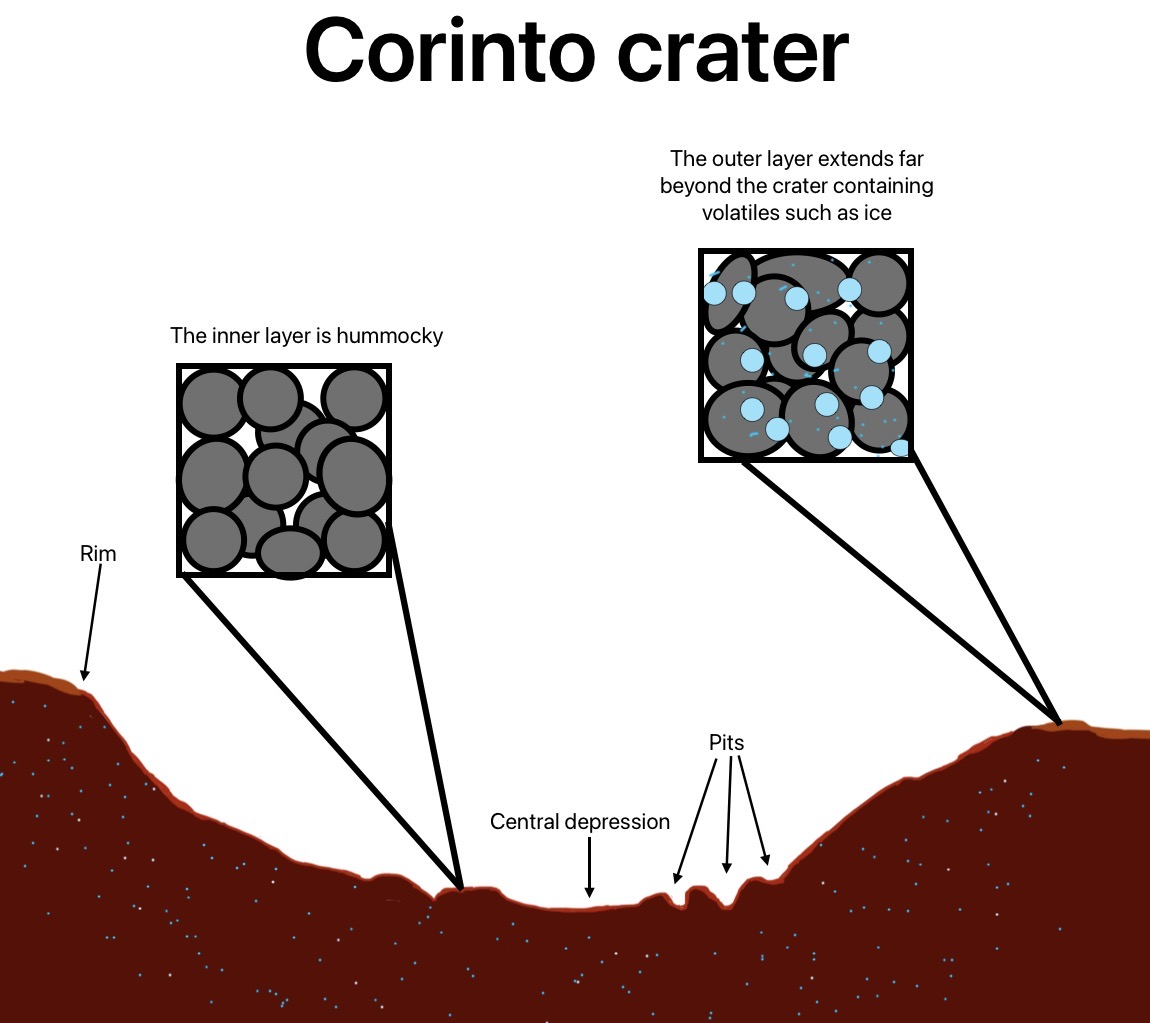
A diagram of Corinto crater, not to scale. Dark red is the Martian surface, blue and white dots in the dark red represents the water or ice-rich rock. There is the central depression and pits which tend to the depression. Boxes show the hummocky ejecta with blue representing volatile elements such as ice.

Covering the crater is a sinuous double layer of impact ejecta that cover the crater. It has an asymmetric lobate distribution with a slight butterfly-like shape extending about 34.3 km northeast–southwest and about 40.1 km northwest–southeast. The inner layer is hummocky with radial striations pointing towards the northwest, south and southeast directions. There are also concentric ridges toward the directions of east and southeast. The outer layer extends far beyond the crater and is associated with ice (including related geomorphic features) and volatiles. To the northeast about 6 km, there is a V-shaped notch lacking the ejecta blankets.

== Impact history ==
It is a young crater impacting Mars around 0.1 to 2.5 ±0.2 million years ago, likely around 2.3 million years ago. It impacted onto the western Elysium Planitia region, specifically on water or ice-rich rock that formed from basaltic flows that occurred roughly 1.7 billion years ago during the early Amazonian period. The impact formed an extensive system of fresh ray systems. There are four sets of rays to the south that extend for more than 2000 km. This means that these impact rays cover a quarter of the planets hemisphere.

=== Secondary impacts ===
This crater has the record for producing one of the most secondary impacts of any known impact. The number of secondary impacts with a diameter of more than 10 meters have been estimated to number around 2 billion. Impacts like these that produce these secondaries have material ejected into space which can land on other planets like Earth, however there are only four Martian meteorites (basaltic shergottites) that are of similar age however their crystallization ages are about 4 to 5 times younger than the Elysium basalts that Corinto impacted suggesting that meteorites from this impact event have not been discovered yet. Some of these canadite meteorites are Zagami and Los Angeles. The crater may also be the source for geochemically enriched enriched shergottite meteorites.

The craters that were made have bright ejecta with relatively high albedos which are around 10-20% brighter than the surrounding area. The ejecta is composed of a thin layer of sintered dust that has enough strength to partially, but not completely, withstand the blast produced from an impactor a few meters in diameter. Secondary craters located distantly from the main crater (~850 m) have low depth to diameter ratios possibly due to lower impact velocities.
