= Stephanie C. Werner =

German geologist and planetologist

Stephanie C. Werner (born 1974) is a German geologist and planetologist, known for her work on Mars and the Arctic. She is a professor in the Centre for Earth Evolution and Dynamics of the University of Oslo in Norway.

Her research has included the discovery that many meteorites of Martian origin come from the Mojave impact crater on Mars, and an estimate that an era of planetary migration in the Solar System occurred earlier than previously thought.

== Education and career ==
Werner earned a diploma in geophysics in 1999 from the University of Kiel, and completed a doctorate (Dr. rer. nat.) in 2005 at the Free University of Berlin; her dissertation was Major Aspects of the Chronostratigraphy and Geologic Evolutionary History of Mars.

After postdoctoral research at the Free University Berlin and the Geological Survey of Norway, she became a researcher at the University of Oslo in 2009. In 2014 she became an associate professor there, and in 2017 a full professor.

== Recognition ==
In 2019, Werner was elected to the Norwegian Academy of Science and Letters.

Asteroid 11449 Stephwerner is named for her.
