= Teghaza 001 =

Martian meteorite found in 2022

- Clan: Martian meteorite
- Country: Mali
- Region: Taoudénit Cercle
- Coordinates: 23.03177°S 4.64630°W
- Observed fall: No
- Found date: September 2022
- Related media on Wikimedia Commons

Teghaza 001 is a Martian meteorite found in 2022 in northern Mali, near Teghazza. At the estimated age of at least 4.1 billion years, Teghaza 001 is one of the three oldest known Martian meteorites alongside Allan Hills 84001 and Northwest Africa 7034. The meteorite preserves evidence of interaction with water on Mars.

== Description ==
The meteorite contains a mixture of igneous minerals, including feldspar and pyroxene, as well as zircon crystals used to determine its age. It is rose-colored and weighs approximately 800 grams. It was found in eight pieces. It appeared to be a shergottite, the most common class of Martian meteorite. First analyses of the meteorite, highlighting its Martian origin, age, and importance for the understanding of water on Mars, were published in 2026 in journals Science and Science Advances.

== Origin ==
Potential origins of Teghaza 001

The meteorite's Martian origin was found through oxygen isotope measurements. Analysis of its mineral composition and isotopes of oxygen and hydrogen revealed evidence of interactions between water and rock in the planet's ancient crust, providing insights into the role of water in shaping early Mars. Age-dating analyses indicate that Teghaza 001 interacted with water-bearing fluids in the Martian crust about 4.1 billion years ago, suggesting that the rock may have crystallized even earlier. Isotopic analyses of its minerals also provide evidence of an ancient Martian hydrosphere, including a water component with a higher deuterium-to-hydrogen ratio than that of Earth's oceans.
