= Shergotty =

Shergotty may refer to:

- Sherghati, also called Shergotty, subdivision-level town of the Gaya district in Bihar, India.
- Shergotty (meteorite)
