= Gamharia =

- Village and city
- Location in Bihar, India Gamharia (India)
- Coordinates: 24°35′28″N 84°44′26″E
- Country: India
- State: Bihar
- District: Gaya
- Elevation: 159 m (522 ft)

sex
  - Official: Maithali, Hindi
- Time zone: UTC+5:30 (IST)
- Postal code: 824211
- ISO 3166 code: IN-BR
- Coastline: 0 kilometres (0 mi)
- Nearest city: Gaya, Kolkata
- Lok Sabha constituency: Gaya
- Avg. summer temperature: 30–48 °C (86–118 °F)
- Avg. winter temperature: 20–3 °C (68–37 °F)

Gamharia is a village in the Gaya district of the Indian state of Bihar.

== Commerce ==
The main markets are Sherghati, Chandiastan, Darioura and Gola Bazar (among the largest cattle markets in Bihar).

== History ==
Gamharia experienced an Indian socialist revolution where the late Sri Tileswar Singh began his dramatically violent protests against the British in India.

His son, Late Sri Kedar Singh, works on development of the panchayat and became Mukhiya of Guneri Panchayat six consecutive times, earning him the nickname 'Mukhiyaji' after the Bihar Panchayat Election.

== Notables ==
- Dr. Rajendra Prasad
- Sri Tileshwar Singh
- Sri Kedar Singh ( Mukhiyaji)
- Shakil Ahmad of Sihuli, former MLA of Gurua.
- Aditya Prasad (of the Sherghati Darbar House) was among the first in town to get a degree in engineering, in London in 1924.
- Subodh Kumar Gupta I.A.S. Jharkhand Cadre
- Professor Sheo Kumar Singh ( Department of Sociology)
- Umesh Kumar Singh (Jharkhand Police)
- Storyteller Prabhat Manjudarshi
- Professor Deepak Kumar Singh

== Geography ==
It is about 45 km (28 mi) from Gaya, situated on Sher Shah Suri Marg (GT Road) between Kolkata and Delhi and is surrounded by the Kamaun range.

National Highway 2 passes through Gamharia, along with State highway 69. It is located on the Amritsar Delhi Kolkata industrial corridor.

== Transport ==
=== Roadways ===
The Grand Trunk Road (NH-2) has undergone a revival through The Golden Quadrilateral project) crosses from Gamharia.

=== Rail ===
The nearest Railway Station, Gaya, is connected to Patna, Ranchi, Jamshedpur, Bokaro, Rourkela, Hazaribag, Kolkata, Varanasi, Allahabad, Kanpur, Delhi, Amritsar,

=== Airports ===
The nearest airport is Gaya Airport, the only international airport in Bihar and Jharkhand. SriLankan Airlines, Drukair and Thai Airways connect Gaya to international destinations. Gaya Airport is 5 km from Bodh-Gaya.

== Cuisine ==
Gamharia prefers a traditional Bihari cuisine. The most popular dishes include sattu, litti, pittha, pua, marua-ka-roti, bari-dal, sattu-ka-roti, baigan-bharta and sukhaota.

Local Muslims are fond of handa (meat cooked in mud vessels by burying them partially into the ground and eliminating metal from the cooking experience), palau, kawab, etc.

== Education ==
The educational climate in Chandisthan has improved (at least at the school level) since DAV Public School opened its branch in town (around 1992). Locals tend to search elsewhere for higher studies.

=== Schools ===
- Anugrah Narayan Shahdev High School (Suggi, Chandisthan)
- Zenith Public School (Chandisthan)
- Lakshami Devi Sarswati Shishu Mandir (Karamdih, Chandisthan)
- Urdu Publick School (Gamharia)
- Dr Zaheer Tishna Memorial School (co-education)
- Ranglal High School (Sherghati)
- DAV Public School (co-education)
- Gurukul Residential School (Sherghati)
- Ramlal & Syam Lal Sanskrit Vidyalaya (Mahmadpur)
- Gyan Deep Public School (Sherghati)
- Heaven flower academy, jail road, Hamzapur, (Sherghati)

=== Universities and colleges ===
- Shri Mahant Shatanand Giri College (Hamzapur, Sherghati)
- Colour craft- A School of Designing & Printing

== See also ==
- Gaya
- Sherghati
- Bodhgaya
