= Los Angeles (meteorite) =

Martian meteorite

Los Angeles Meteorite
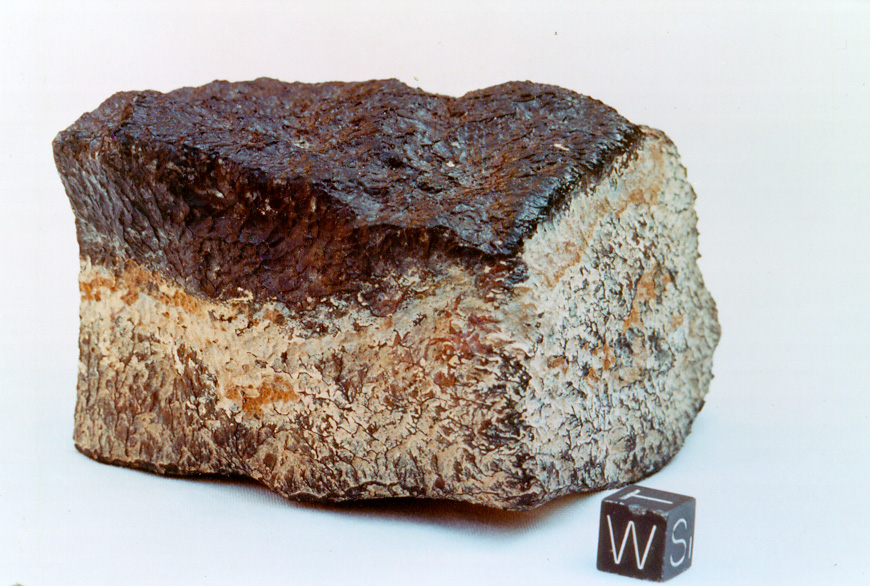
- Los Angeles: Mars meteorite stone#1 (shergottite) weighing 452.6 grams. 1 cm square cube for scale
- Type: Achondrite
- Class: Martian meteorite
- Group: Shergottite
- Parent body: Mars
- Country: United States
- Region: Mojave Desert
- Fall date: No
- Found date: October 30, 1999
- TKW: 698 grams (24.6 oz)
- Strewn field: No
- Los Angeles: Mars meteorite stone #2 (shergottite) weighing 245.4 grams. 1 cm square cube for scale

The Los Angeles Meteorite is a Martian meteorite fallen in California's Mojave Desert. It was found around 1980 by Bob Verish and consists of two stones of 452.6 grams (15.96 oz) and 245.4 grams (8.66 oz). Verish stored the meteorites in his rock collection before examining the find again on October 30, 1999 when he recognized it as a meteorite. He removed small samples for analysis by Alan Rubin at UCLA. By January 12, analysis confirmed the meteorite to be of Martian origin, similar to QUE 94201 found in the Antarctic in 1994.

Analysis at the time noted that the meteorite was "in many respects was the most geochemically evolved sample yet discovered from Mars." A 2000 paper in the journal Geology described the meteorite as being "more differentiated, with higher concentrations of incompatible elements (e.g., La) and a higher abundance of late-stage phases such as phosphates and K-rich feldspathic glass" than previous Martian meteorites such as Shergotty and Zagami meteorites.
