= Elgoresyite =

High-pressure iron-magnesium silicate mineral

General
- Category: silicate mineral
- Formula: (Mg,Fe)_{5}Si_{2}O_{9}
- IMA symbol: Ego
- Strunz classification: 09.
- Crystal system: Monoclinic
- Space group: C2/m
- Unit cell: a = 9.397 Å, b = 2.763 Å c = 11.088 Å; β=94.25°; Z = 2

Identification
- Color: undetermined
- Crystal habit: subhedral
- Cleavage: undetermined
- Fracture: undetermined
- Tenacity: undetermined
- Mohs scale hardness: undetermined
- Luster: undetermined
- Streak: undetermined
- Diaphaneity: Transparent
- Density: 4.315 g/cm^{3}
- Optical properties: undetermined
- Refractive index: (n=K_{c}*D+1) is 1.95
- Melting point: ~2000K at ~23 GPa

Elgoresyite, first discovered during the crystallographic study of the Suizhou meteorite, is a naturally occurring, high-pressure iron-magnesium silicate mineral. High-pressure polymorphs of magnesium silicates have been rarely discovered on Earth, due to retrograding as they ascend to the surface. It is named after Ahmed El Goresy.

== Occurrence ==
Currently, Elgoresyite has only been known to occur in the shock-induced melt veins of the Suizhou meteorite. These veins are ~300 μm in thickness. It is found in association with the minerals ringwoodite, olivine, tetragonal ringwoodite, taenite, and MgSiO_{3} rich glass.

== Appearance and properties ==
Physical properties such as color, luster, streak, hardness, tenacity, cleavage, fracture, and density could not be determined due to small grain size of the only known sample available. Optical properties as well were not able to be determined for this same reason. Density (calc) however is 4.315 g/cm^{3}. This was based on the empirical formula and single-crystal XRD data.

== Chemical properties ==
The empirical formula is (Mg_{3.38}Si_{1.95}Fe^{2+}_{1.60}Al_{0.05}Na_{0.03}Ca_{0.02})_{Σ = 7.03}O_{9}. The simplified and ideal chemical formula is (Mg,Fe)_{5}Si_{2}O_{9}.

== Crystallography ==
The crystal system is monoclinic, and the space group is C2/m (#12). The unit cell parameters are :a = 9.397(2) Å, b = 2.763(1) Å, c = 11.088(3) Å, β = 94.25(2)°, volume V =287.10(14) Å^{3}, and number of formulas per unit cell, Z = 2.
