= Deception Point =

2001 novel by Dan Brown

- First edition cover
- Author: Dan Brown
- Language: English
- Genre: Thriller
- Publisher: Pocket Books
- Publication date: 2001
- Publication place: United States
- Media type: Print (hardback & paperback)
- Pages: 372 (hardback) 580 (paperback)
- ISBN: 0671027379
- LC Class: PS3552.R685434 D4 2001

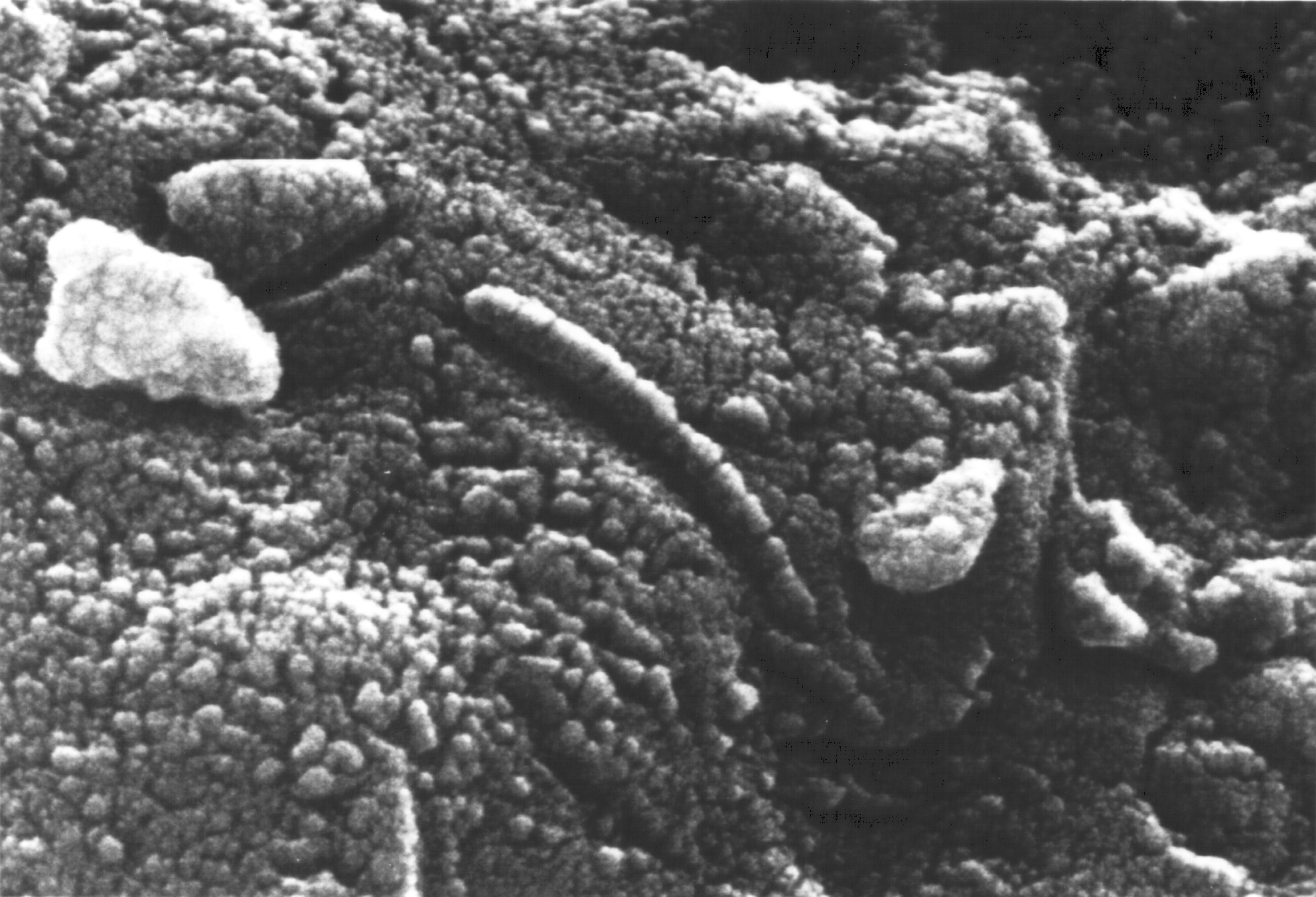
Microscopic structures on the meteorite Allan Hills 84001 which were seen as possible evidence of Martian life; this inspired the plot of Deception Point.

Deception Point is a 2001 mystery-thriller novel by American author Dan Brown. It is Brown's third novel. It was published by Simon & Schuster.

The novel follows White House intelligence analyst Rachel Sexton's involvement in corroborating NASA's discovery of a meteorite that supposedly contains proof of extraterrestrial life, resembling the ALH84001 case. The discovery comes at a time close to the United States presidential election in which her father is running. The discovery will aid the campaign of her employer, the incumbent president of the United States, Zachary Herney, but put her further at odds with her already estranged father, Senator Sedgewick Sexton, who is running for election. Ms. Sexton, accompanied by a team of experts, must prove the authenticity of the meteorite, which will either make or break the campaign of President Herney.

== Plot ==
On the eve of a United States presidential election, NASA discovers a meteorite in the Milne Ice Shelf containing fossils of insect-like creatures, seemingly proving the existence of extraterrestrial life. The discovery could potentially be a deciding factor in the presidential election, in which one of the key issues is whether to continue funding NASA. Incumbent US President Zachary Herney favors supporting space research, while his challenger Senator Sedgewick Sexton argues for dissolving NASA.

President Herney sends a team of experts to the Arctic to verify the authenticity of the extraterrestrial insect: oceanographer Michael Tolland, astrophysicist Corky Marlinson, glaciologist Norah Mangor, paleontologist Wailee Ming, and National Reconnaissance Office employee Rachel Sexton, Senator Sexton's daughter.

When the scientists find an anomaly that calls the authenticity of NASA's discovery into question, they are attacked by a Delta Force team that had secretly been spying on them. The Delta Force soldiers kill Ming and Mangor while leaving Rachel, Tolland and Marlinson to perish on an ice floe, but they are rescued by the Navy submarine USS Charlotte. Rachel alerts presidential advisor Marjorie Tench and NRO director William Pickering of the attack, and Pickering sends an air transport to bring them back to the United States.

Meanwhile, in Washington, D.C., Tench tries to sabotage Sexton's campaign by blackmailing his aide, Gabrielle Ashe, with photos of an extramarital affair that she had with Senator Sexton, and reveals that Sexton is secretly backed by a coalition of private aerospace corporations who would profit from NASA's dissolution. Ashe discovers that Tench's claims are true, but also finds out that NASA lied about the origin of the meteorite.

The surviving scientists retreat to Tolland's research ship off the New Jersey coast, where they fully re-analyze their data and discover that the meteorite is fake. A surprise attack by the Delta Force team prompts Rachel to fax the data to her father, asking for help. In the ensuing skirmish, all Delta Force soldiers are killed, their helicopter is sunk, and Pickering is revealed to be their commander; he masterminded the fake meteorite to aid Herney's campaign and prevent the dissolution of NASA. The ship and Pickering are sucked in by a vortex, while a Coast Guard Osprey picks up Rachel, Tolland and Marlinson.

Sexton attempts to reveal Rachel's fax in a press conference in hopes of implicating NASA and the president in the meteorite hoax, but Rachel and Gabrielle swap Rachel's fax with the photo evidence of Sexton's affair with Gabrielle, humiliating him and ruining his chances of winning the election. By the end of the story, Michael and Rachel have developed a romantic relationship.

== Reception ==
Deception Point received mostly positive reviews, with The Week naming it Brown's second-best novel (after The Da Vinci Code). Publishers Weekly said it was "an excellent thriller—a big yet believable story unfolding at breakneck pace, with convincing settings and just the right blend of likable and hateful characters."
