= David S. McKay =

American planetary geologist (1936–2013)

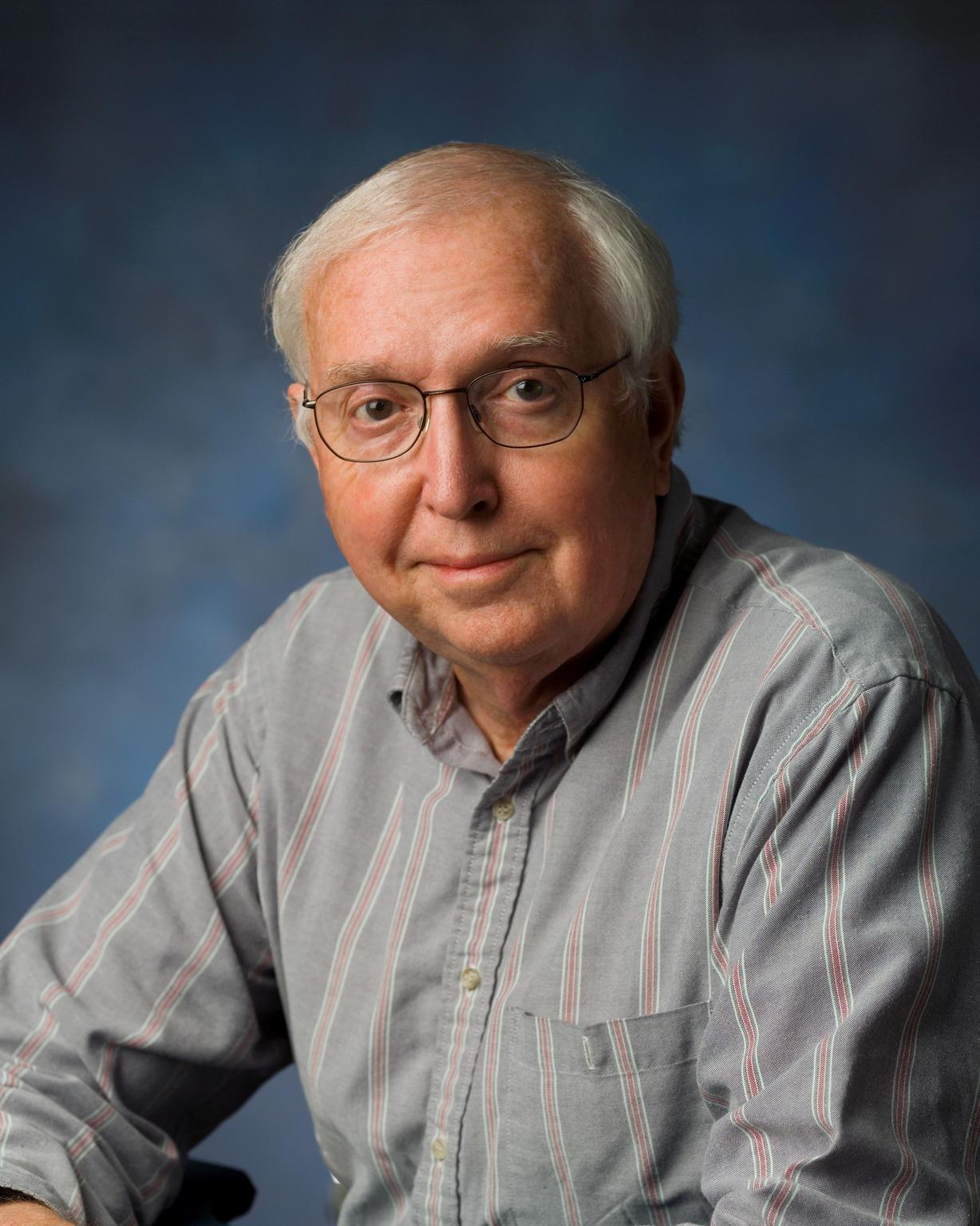
- Born: September 25, 1936
- Died: February 20, 2013 (aged 76)
- Education: Rice University (Geology)
- Occupations: Chief Scientist for astrobiology, Johnson Space Center
- Known for: leading the team that announced the discovery of possible microfossils in a Martian meteorite from Antarctica

David Stewart McKay (September 25, 1936 – February 20, 2013) was the chief scientist for Astrobiology at the Johnson Space Center. During the Apollo program, McKay provided geology training to the first men to walk on the Moon in the late 1960s. McKay was the first author of a scientific paper postulating past life on Mars based on evidence in Martian meteorite ALH 84001, which had been found in Antarctica. Despite there being no convincing evidence of Martian life, the initial paper caused enormous scientific and public attention. The NASA Astrobiology Institute was founded partially due to community interest in this paper and related topics. He was a native of Titusville, Pennsylvania.

== Apollo program ==
As a graduate student in geology at Rice University, McKay was present at John F. Kennedy's speech in 1962 announcing the goal of landing a man on the Moon within the decade. Inspired by Kennedy's speech, McKay as a NASA scientist trained the Apollo astronauts in geology. He was a chief trainer for Neil Armstrong and Buzz Aldrin during their last geology field trip in West Texas. On July 20, 1969, in Houston, McKay was the only geologist present in the Apollo Mission Control Room when Armstrong and Aldrin walked on the Moon, serving as a resource. He was named the principal investigator to study the samples that they brought back from the Moon.

== Lunar dust ==
McKay studied lunar dust since the return of the first Apollo 11 samples in 1969 and contributed over 200 publications on this topic. As a result of this effort, McKay contributed to major discoveries, including:

- Source of vapor deposition on lunar soil grains
- Formation of nano-phase iron globules on lunar soil grains
- Processes on the Moon that contribute to grain size distribution
- Space weathering and chemically activated nature of in-situ lunar dust.

== Space resources and planetary materials ==
McKay published numerous papers and abstracts relating to planetary materials and space resource utilization: lunar regolith, cosmic dust, meteorites, Martian soil analogs, and technologies for producing oxygen, water, and building materials from lunar soil.

== Lunar simulants ==
McKay, James Carter of the University of Texas at Dallas, and others developed the engineering simulant JSC-1.

== Martian microfossils ==
McKay's team published their findings in 1996 regarding possible microfossil structures in Martian meteorite ALH 84001. McKay presented more than 100 talks at scientific and public gatherings on the possibility of life on Mars and the implications of that possibility. These claims were controversial from the beginning, and much of the scientific community ultimately rejected the hypothesis once all the unusual features in the meteorite had been explained without requiring life to be present.

== Contributions to medical science ==
McKay's research group conducted studies of nanobacteria, tiny life forms such as might be found in extraterrestrial environments. McKay's group was also part of a pioneering study on the effects of lunar dust on health. Using one of the largest returned Apollo regolith samples released to scientists, the research team separated and studied the tiniest-sized lunar dust particles.

== Asteroid 6111 Davemckay ==
McKay was honored by the International Astronomical Union (IAU) by having asteroid 6111 Davemckay named for him in 2002. His IAU citation mentions his years of work on lunar samples as well as the positive effect his research on Martian meteorites has had on planetary research.

== Education ==
- Rice University, B.A., Geology, 1958
- University of California – Berkeley, M.A., Geology, 1960
- Rice University, Ph.D., Geology, 1964

== Professional positions ==
- 1996–2013: Chief scientist for Astrobiology and Planetary Science and Exploration

NASA Johnson Space Center, Houston, Texas 77058

- Assistant for Exploration and Technology – NASA Johnson Space Center, 1994–1996
- Chief, Planetary Programs Office – NASA Johnson Space Center, 1991–1994
- Chief, Mission Science and Technology Office – NASA Johnson Space Center, 1990–1991
- Chief, Space Resources Utilization Office – NASA Johnson Space Center, 1987–1990
- Staff Scientist – NASA Johnson Space Center, 1965–1987
- Exploration geophysicist, Exxon and Marine Geophysical, 1960–1961

== Honors ==
- Outstanding Graduate Student Award, Rice University Geology Department, 1963
- Certificate of Special Commendation for Astronaut Training in Geology, Geological Society of America, 1973
- NASA Superior Achievement Award for Lunar Science Contributions, JSC, 1973
- Visiting Scientist Fellowship, Government of Japan, 1974–75
- NASA Principal Investigator Recognition Award, 1979
- Multiple Outstanding Performance and Sustained Superior Performance Awards by NASA
- Eight Group Achievement Awards: Field Geology Training Team, Lunar Science Team, Lunar Landing Team, Lunar Surface Experiments Team, First Lunar Outpost Team, Orbital Debris Team, Planetary Materials Curation Team, and Mars Life Public Affairs Team
- Laurels Award, 1996, by Aviation Week and Space Technology
- Life on Mars Team awarded Rotary National Stellar Award for Space Achievement
- Life on Mars Team awarded Popular Science Magazine Award: The Best of What's New: Grand Award Winner
- NASA Exceptional Scientific Achievement Medal (NASA's highest award for science), July 1997
- Distinguished Texas Scientist Award, 2000, The Texas Academy of Science

== Personal ==
McKay's future wife, Mary Fae, was also in the audience at Rice Stadium during President Kennedy's pivotal speech, although McKay had not met her at that time. She went on to become a NASA technical editor.

McKay died in Houston, Texas, of heart disease.

== See also ==
- Christopher McKay – a NASA astrobiologist.
