= Orthopyroxenite =

Orthopyroxene rich endmember of the pyroxenite family.

- Igneous rock
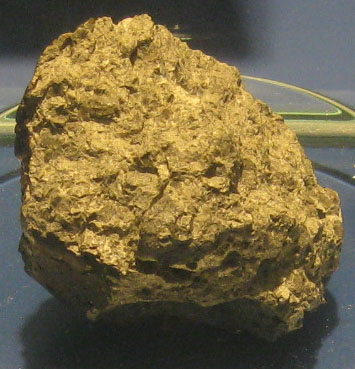
- ALH 84001 is an extraterrestrial example of an orthopyroxenite. It is an achondrite meteorite from Mars.

Composition
- Classification: Ultramafic
- Primary: orthopyroxene
- Secondary: olivine, clinopyroxene, hornblende, spinel, chromite, garnet, anorthite
- Texture: Phaneritic

Orthopyroxenite is an ultramafic rock that is almost exclusively made from the mineral orthopyroxene, the orthorhombic version of pyroxene and a type of pyroxenite. It can have up to a few percent of olivine and clinopyroxene. If it contains between 5 and 40% olivine, it is an olivine orthopyroxenite. If it contains over 40% olivine and orthopyroxene, it is a harzburgite.

This ternary diagram shows the orthopyroxenites as a function of olivine, clinopyroxene and orthopyroxene abundance.

Orthopyroxenites can also occur on other planets. ALH 84001 is a Martian meteorite that can be classified as an orthopyroxenite. It is the only meteorite found with that composition and the only member of the Martian orthopyroxenite group of meteorites.
