= Mojave (crater) =

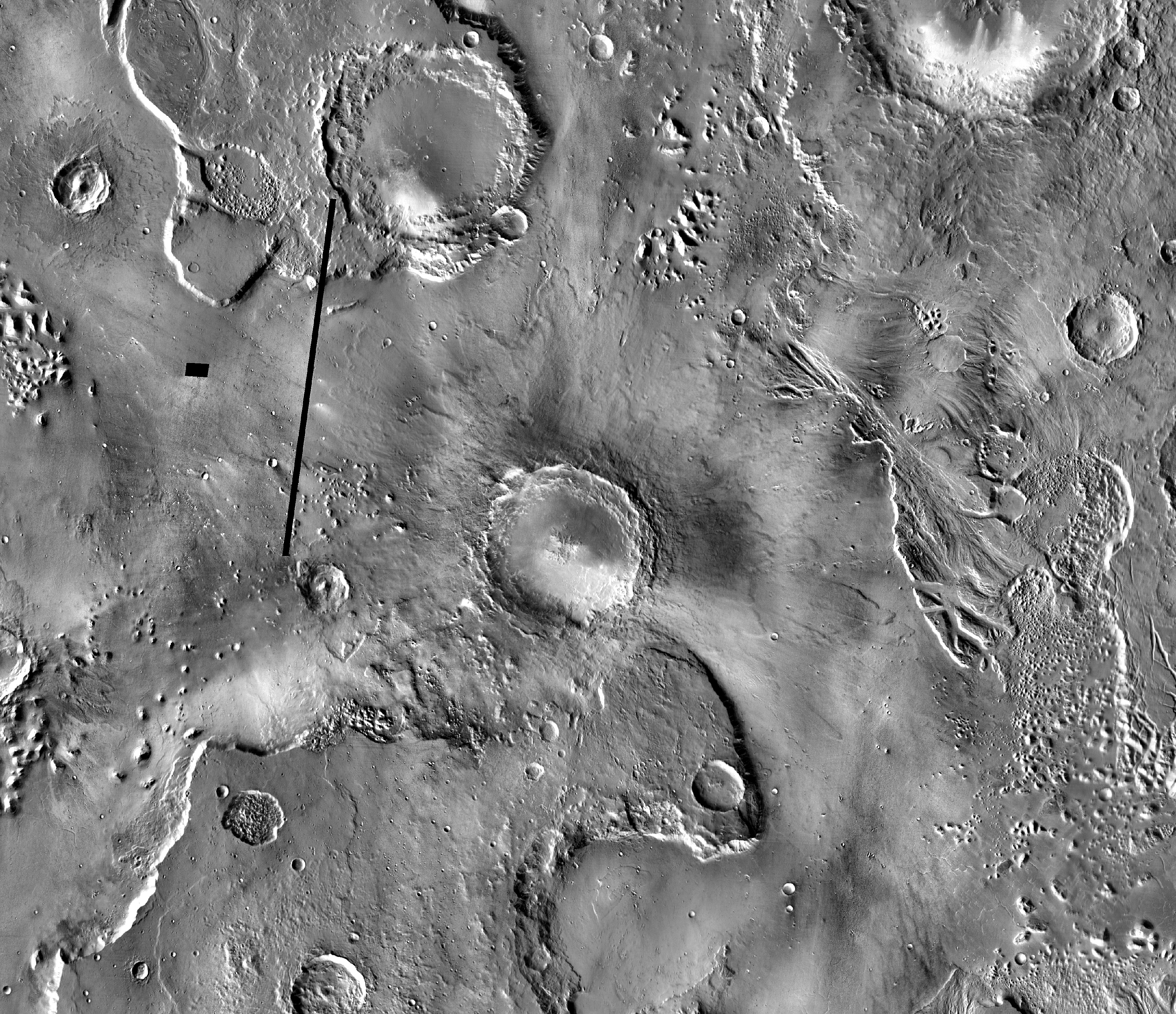
- THEMIS daytime infrared image mosaic showing Mojave (center) and its surroundings. The outflow channel Tiu Valles snakes through the image south-north to the right of Mojave.
- Planet: Mars
- Coordinates: 7.5°N 33.0°W
- Quadrangle: Oxia Palus
- Eponym: Mojave, California, USA

Mojave is a 58 km diameter impact crater in the Oxia Palus quadrangle of Mars, located at 7.5° N and 33.0° W. It was named after the town of Mojave in southern California, U.S.

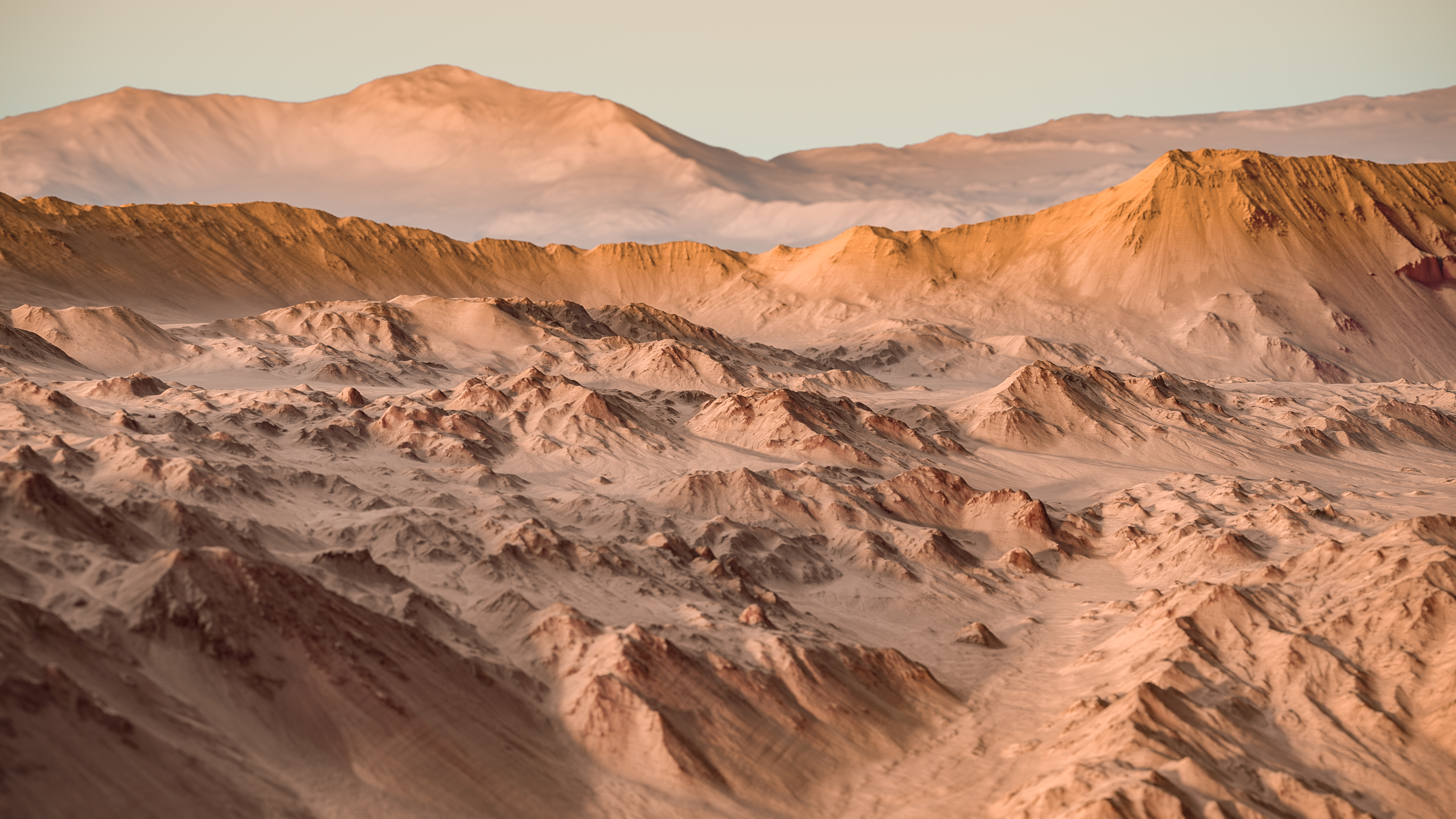
Dissected Wall of Mojave Crater, reprocessed from HiRISE data

The crater is located within the Martian Xanthe Terra region.

== Description ==
Mojave has alluvial fans that look remarkably similar to landforms in the Mojave Desert in the American southwest. Fans inside and around the outsides of the crater are closely similar to Earth's alluvial fans. As on Earth, the largest rocks are near the mouths of the fans. Because the channels start at ridge tops, it is believed they were formed by heavy downpours. Researchers have suggested that the rain may have been initiated by impacts.

Some parts of the crater display a high concentration of closely spaced pits. Pits show little or no evidence of rims or ejecta. The pits are so close to each other that adjacent pits often share the same wall. It is believed that the pits form from steam produced when the heat from the impact process interacts with ice in the ground.

The depth of Mojave is approximately 2,600 meters (1.63 miles). Based on its ratio of depth to diameter, researchers believe it is very young. It is not old enough to have accumulated much material and start to fill. Its relatively undegraded state helps scientists model impact processes on Mars. If one measures the diameter of a crater, the original depth can be estimated with various ratios. Because of this relationship, researchers have found that many Martian craters contain a great deal of material; much of it is believed to be ice deposited when the climate was different.

Mojave is a rayed crater, another indication of its youth, and is the largest such crater on Mars. Based on crater counts of its ejecta blanket, it is thought to be about 3 million years old. It is believed to be the most recent crater of its size on Mars, and has been identified as the probable source of the shergottite meteorites collected on Earth. However, the latter hypothesis is controversial.

== Gallery ==
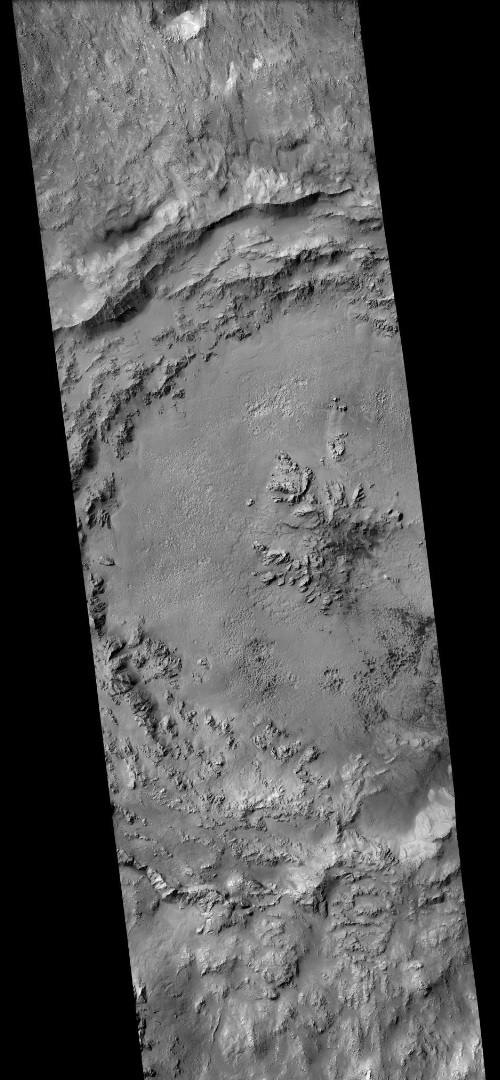
Mojave as seen by CTX camera (on Mars Reconnaissance Orbiter).

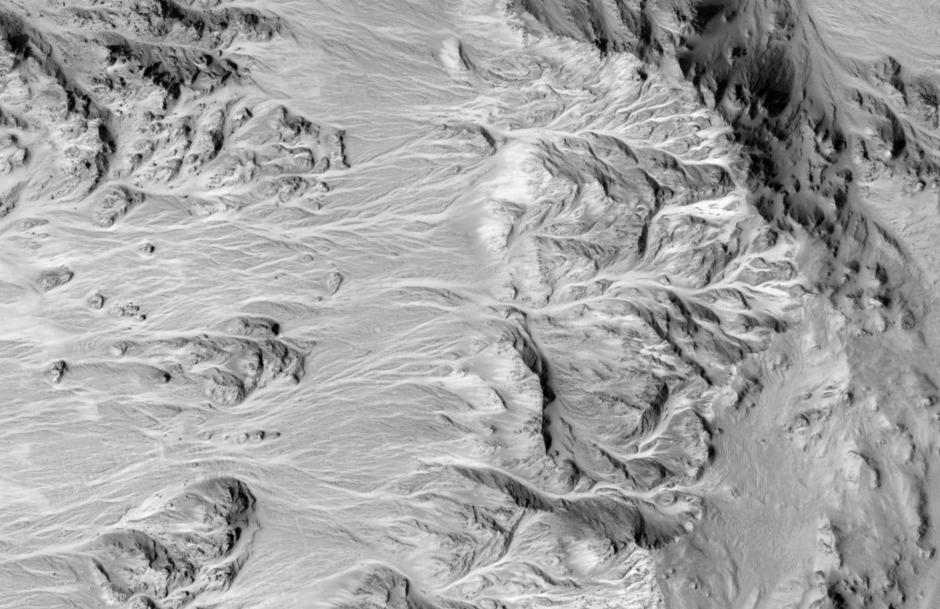
Alluvial fans in Mojave, as seen by HiRISE. The crater rim is on the right. A branched network of channels runs downward towards the left.

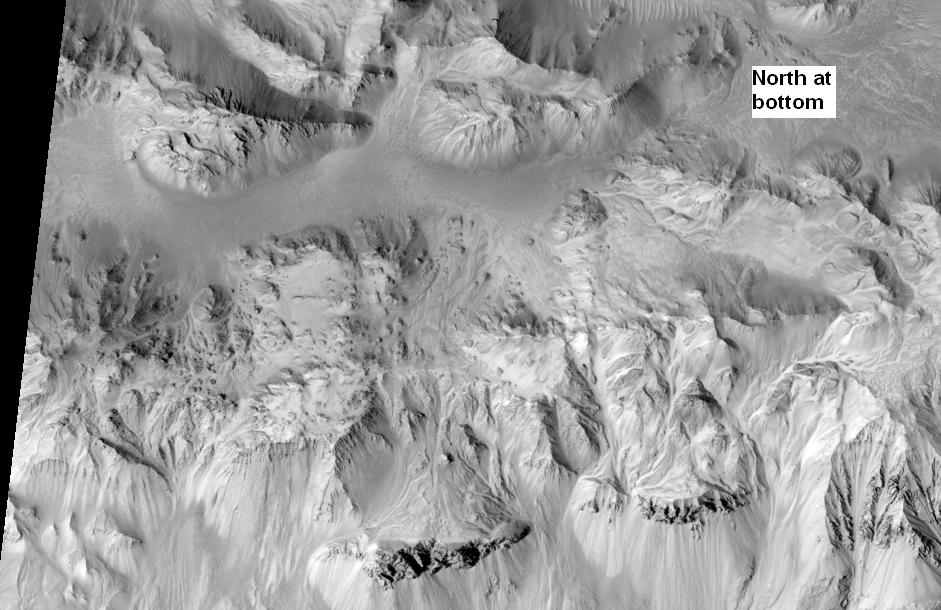
Another view of Mojave from HiRISE. North is at bottom.

== See also ==
- Geology of Mars
- Impact crater
- Impact event
- List of craters on Mars
- Ore resources on Mars
- Planetary nomenclature
- Water on Mars
