= Shergotty meteorite =

Martian shergotty meteorite discovered in India, Bihar

Coordinates: 24°34′26.32″N 84°47′35.4″E

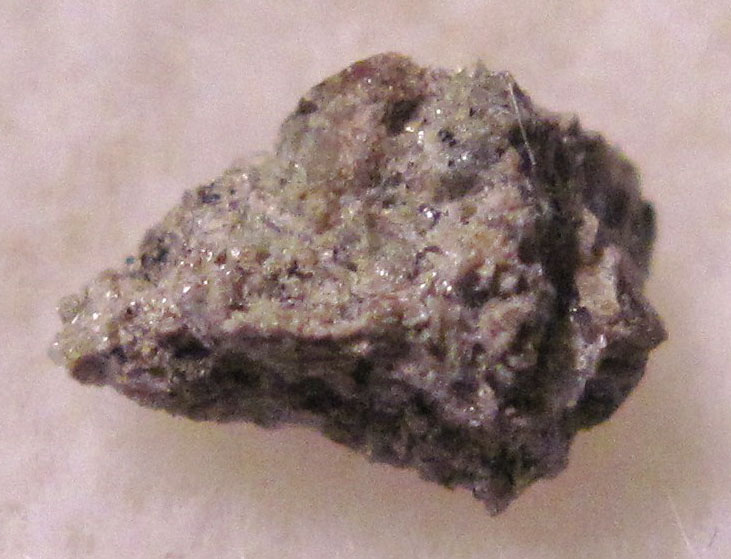
- 50-milligram fragment of the Shergotty meteorite
- Type: Achondrite
- Class: Martian meteorite
- Group: Shergottite
- Parent body: Mars
- Country: India
- Region: Sherghati, Gaya district, Bihar
- Fall date: 1865-08-25
- TKW: 5-kilogram (11 lb)
- Alternative names: Sherghati meteorite
- Related media on Wikimedia Commons

The Shergotty meteorite (named after Sherghati) is the first example of the shergottite Martian meteorite family. It was a 5-kilogram (11 lb) meteorite which fell to Earth at Sherghati, in the Gaya district, Bihar, India on 25 August 1865, and was retrieved by witnesses almost immediately. Radiometric dating indicates that it solidified from a volcanic magma about 4.1 billion years ago. It is composed mostly of pyroxene and is thought to have undergone preterrestrial aqueous alteration for several centuries. Certain features within its interior are suggestive of being remnants of biofilm and their associated microbial communities.

== See also ==
- ALH84001 meteorite
- Glossary of meteoritics
- Life on Mars
- List of meteorites on Mars
- Nakhla meteorite
- NWA 7034 meteorite
- Yamato 000593 meteorite
