= Zagami meteorite =

Meteorite found in Nigeria

Zagami
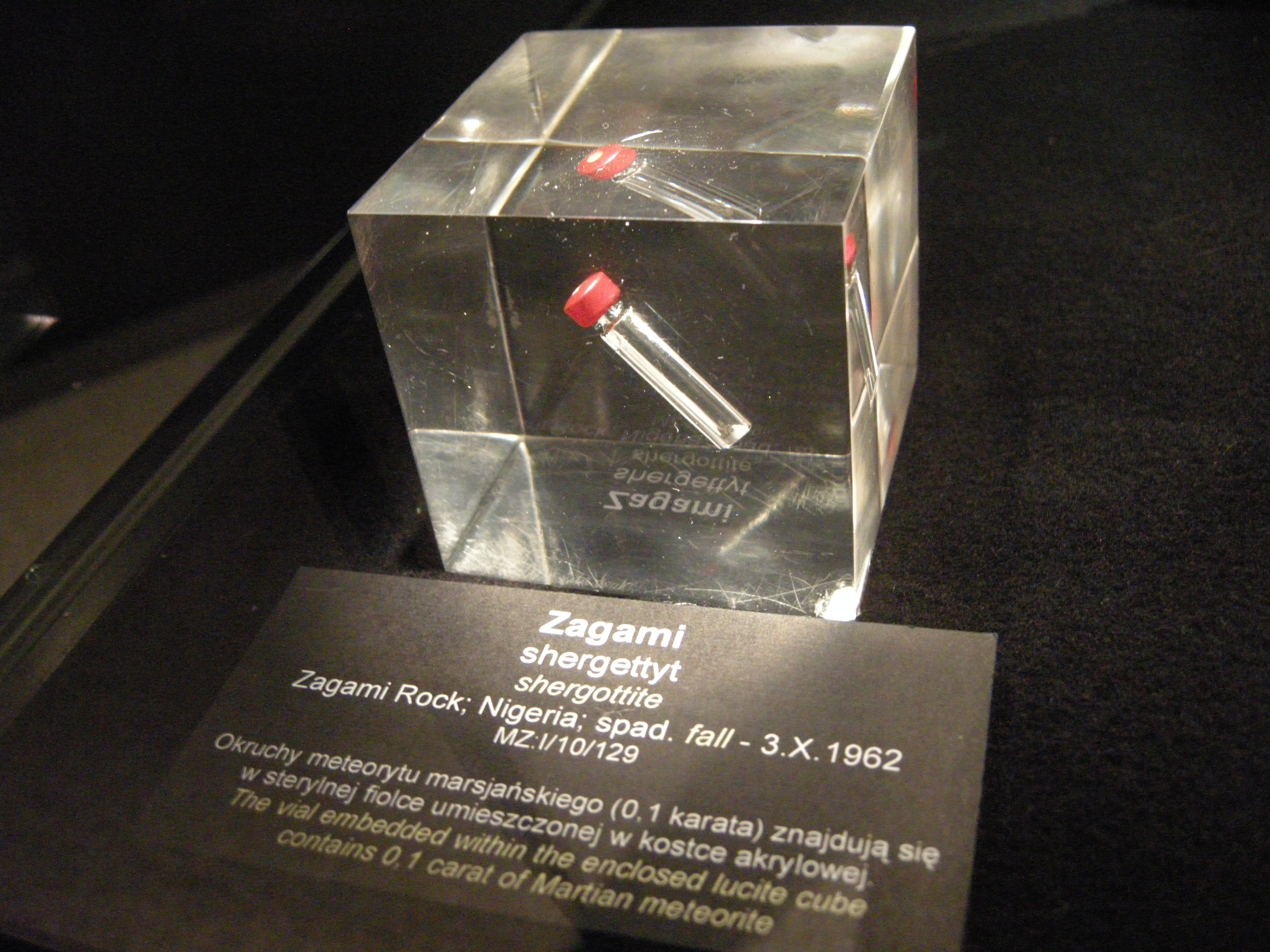
- Fragment of the Zagami meteorite
- Type: Achondrite
- Class: Martian meteorite
- Group: Shergottite
- Parent body: Mars
- Composition: Shergottite-basaltic
- Country: Nigeria
- Region: Katsina State
- Coordinates: 11°44′N 7°5′E
- Observed fall: Yes
- Fall date: October 3, 1962
- Found date: October 3, 1962
- TKW: 18 kilograms (40 lb)
- Strewn field: no

Zagami is a Martian meteorite weighing about 18 kilograms (40 lb). It landed 10 feet (3.0 m) from a farmer near Zagami, Nigeria, and became buried in a hole about 2 feet (0.61 m) deep. According to Ron Baalke of NASA/JPL, "The Zagami meteorite is the most easily obtainable SNC meteorite available to collectors," referring to the SNC classification of meteorites (Shergottites, Nakhlites, Chassignites), of which Martian meteorites belong.

== Zagamiite ==
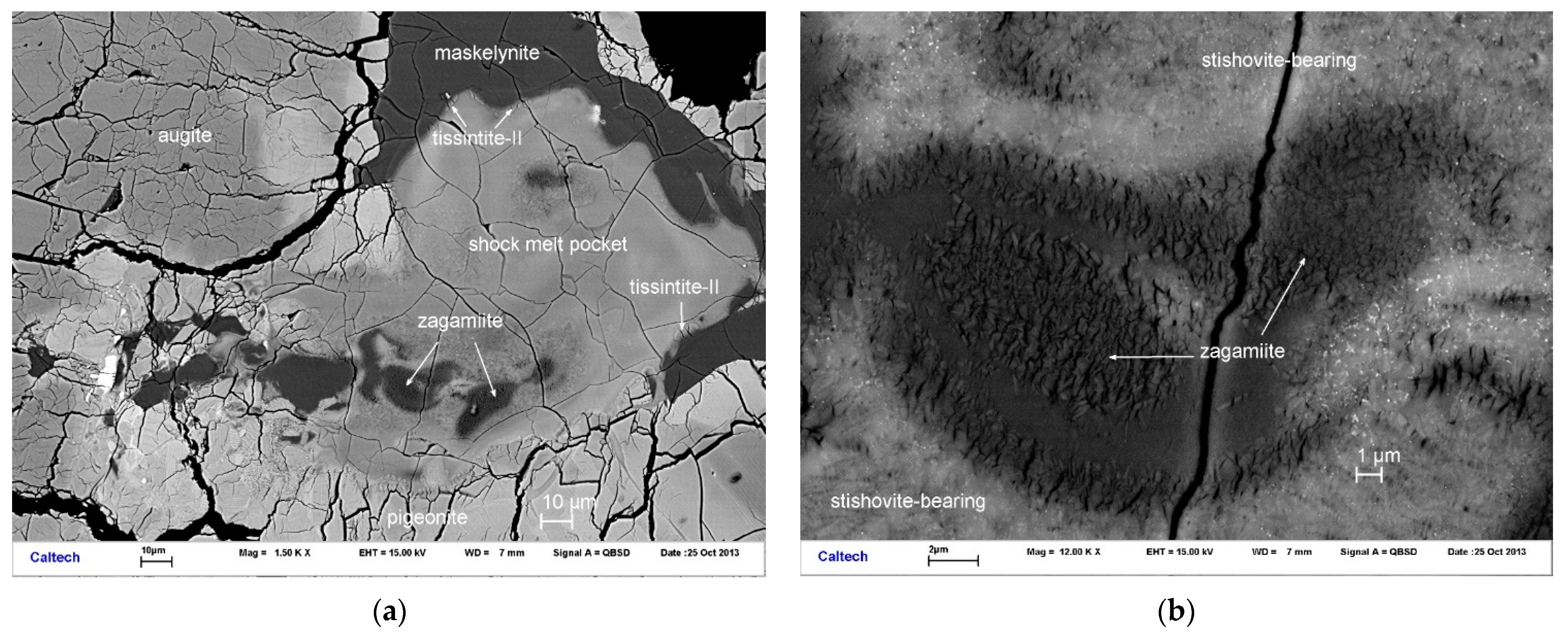
(a) Backscatter electron (BSE) image: zagamiite-bearing shock melt pocket in Zagami meteorite. (b) Enlarged BSE image of areas in (a) revealing fine-grained zagamiite. Stishovite-bearing regions also contain zagamiite & quenched melt.

Zagamiite is a mineral that was found in the meteorite and is therefore named after it.
