= Suizhou meteorite =

Meteorite found in China

- Type: Stone
- Class: Olivine-hypersthene chondrite (L6)
- Country: China
- Region: Hubei
- Coordinates: 31°43′N 113°23′E
- Observed fall: Yes
- Fall date: April 15, 1986
- TKW: 270 kg

The Suizhou meteorite is a stone meteorite which fell on April 15, 1986, in Dayanpo, 12.5 km to the southeast of Suizhou city, Hubei province, China.

Right after the fall of this meteorite, a group of scientists from the China University of Geosciences and the Institute of Geochemistry, Chinese Academy of Sciences, conducted a field survey and collection of Suizhou meteorite samples. A total weight of 270 kg of this meteorite was collected. The largest piece, a fragment of 56 kg in weight, is now preserved in the City Museum of Suizhou, and the smallest piece only weighs 20 g.
