= Northwest Africa 7034 =

Martian meteorite

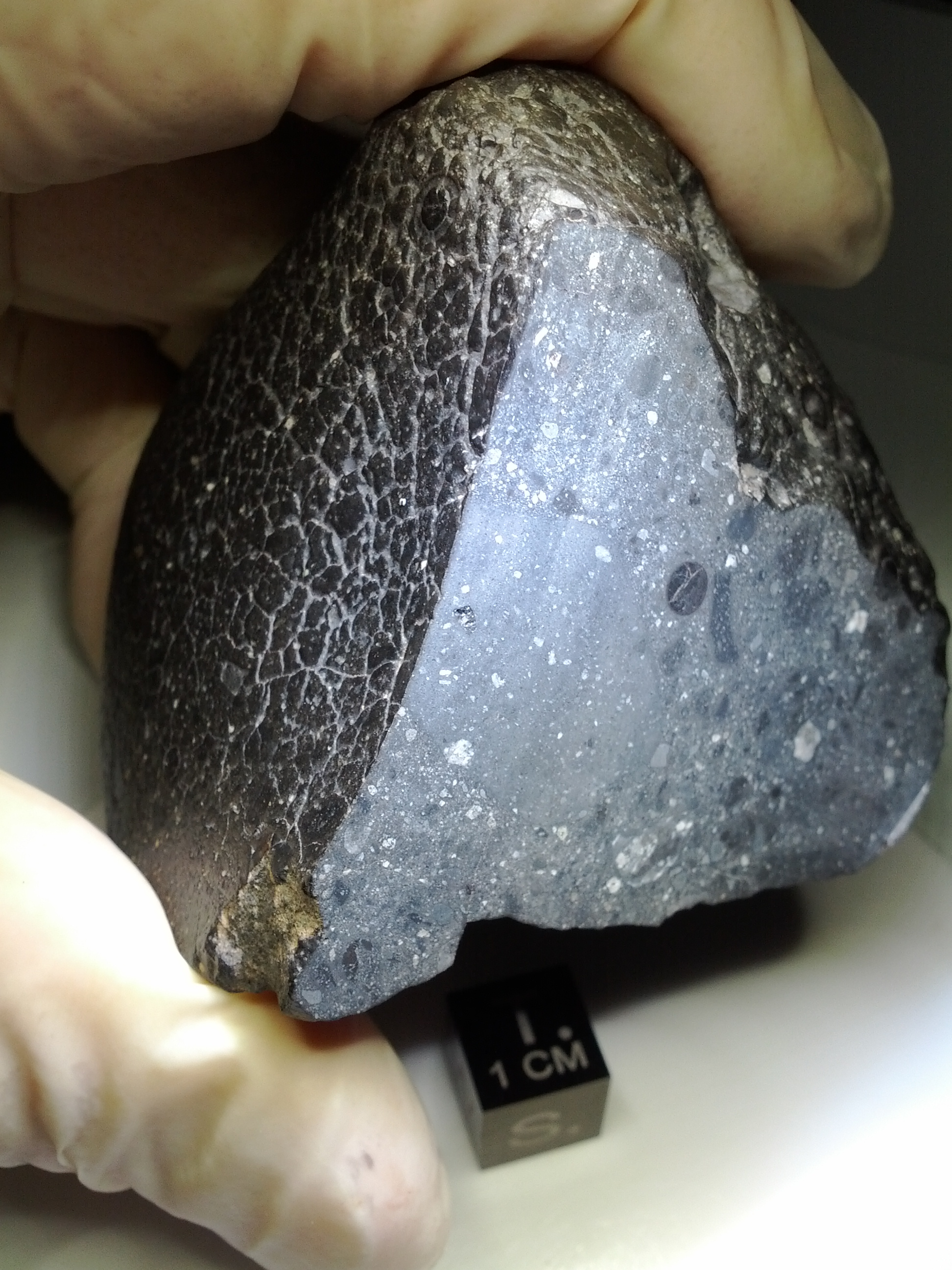
- Northwest Africa 7034, nicknamed "Black Beauty"
- Type: Achondrite
- Clan: Martian meteorite
- Grouplet: Martian (basaltic breccia)
- Composition: Plagioclase and pyroxene phenocrysts in a fine groundmass.
- Weathering grade: Minimal
- Country: Western Sahara, Morocco
- Coordinates: 24°5.311′N 14°46.671′W (purchased from dealer)
- Observed fall: No
- Found date: 2011
- TKW: 320 grams (11 oz)

Northwest Africa 7034 (NWA 7034, nicknamed Black Beauty) is a Martian meteorite. It contains portions estimated to be 4.43 billion years old and contains the most water of any Martian meteorite found on Earth. Although it is from Mars it does not fit into any of the three SNC meteorite categories, and forms a new Martian meteorite group named "Martian (basaltic breccia)". It was purchased in Morocco and a slice of it was donated to the University of New Mexico by its American owner.

== Discovery and naming ==
The meteorite was found by nomads in Rabt Sbayta, Ghredad Sabti region, Western Sahara, in the Sahara Desert in 2011, and was purchased in Morocco by a meteorite dealer who sold it to a collector in the United States, as Morocco does not have meteorite export control laws. Like all meteorites that are found in large numbers or sold at markets the name stands for the geographic region (Northwest Africa) and a number, which is given out consecutively.

== Description ==
NWA 7034 consists of hundreds of fragments stuck together, containing both very old and very young rocks. It was originally described as a volcanic breccia that has a porphyritic appearance, consisting of plagioclase (andesine) and pyroxene (pigeonite and augite) phenocrysts that are up to 5 mm in diameter set in a fine grained groundmass. Accessory minerals include chlorapatite, chromite, goethite, ilmenite, magnetite, maghemite, alkali feldspar and pyrite. There are even some clasts present that are made of quenched magma. The groundmass is made from fine grained plagioclase, pyroxene, different oxide minerals, and traces of iron sulfides. The whole rock chemistry revealed that NWA 7034 has the highest water content ever measured in a Martian meteorite. The water might be derived from oceans that used to exist on Mars, but were still present when the volcanic rock, that would eventually become the meteorite, was erupted.

The meteorite contains components as old as 4.42 ± 0.07 Ga (billion years), and was heated during the Amazonian period of Mars. It is the second oldest Martian meteorite known. However, a team of Japanese researchers who studied the meteorite concluded that water on Mars originated around 4.4 billion years ago.

== Classification ==
NWA 7034 is the first Martian meteorite that is a breccia and does not fall in any of the known Martian meteorite groups (shergottite, nakhlite, chassignite and ALH 84001). NWA 7034 was classified as an ungrouped planetary achondrite until the Meteoritical Society approved the new designation "Martian (basaltic breccia)" in January 2013. The iron/manganese ratio is consistent with that of other Martian meteorites, but the oxygen isotopes do not correlate with a Martian origin. The change in oxygen isotope ratios could be explained by removal or addition of heavier or lighter isotopes, or by mixing with a mass with a different isotopic ratio. This could happen during aqueous alteration of the Martian crust. Another explanation would be an isotopic contamination of the Martian crust during impact brecciation.

In 2018 the Nomenclature Committee of the Meteoritical Society accepted a petition to reclassify the NWA 7034 pairing group as "Martian (polymict breccia)". The older term, "basaltic breccia," was held to be unsuitable because the stones contain a variety of clast types, including impact melts, sedimentary rocks, and a wide variety of other lithologies.

== Origin ==
A 2022 study concluded that meteorite NWA 7034 was ejected from Mars by the impact that formed the crater Karratha about 5-10 million years ago in the Terra Cimmeria-Terra Sirenum region of the southern highlands. The authors proposed that before its ejection, this meteorite was part of the ejecta deposits from an earlier impact that formed the nearby Khujirt crater approximately 1.5 billion years ago.

== See also ==
- Glossary of meteoritics
- List of Martian meteorites
- List of meteorites on Mars

== Book sources ==
- Tills, Tony (2013), Science Year, World Book, Inc., ISBN 978-0-7166-0567-6
