= Martian meteorite =

Meteorite made of rock originating from Mars

Martian meteorite (SNC meteorites)
- — Clan —
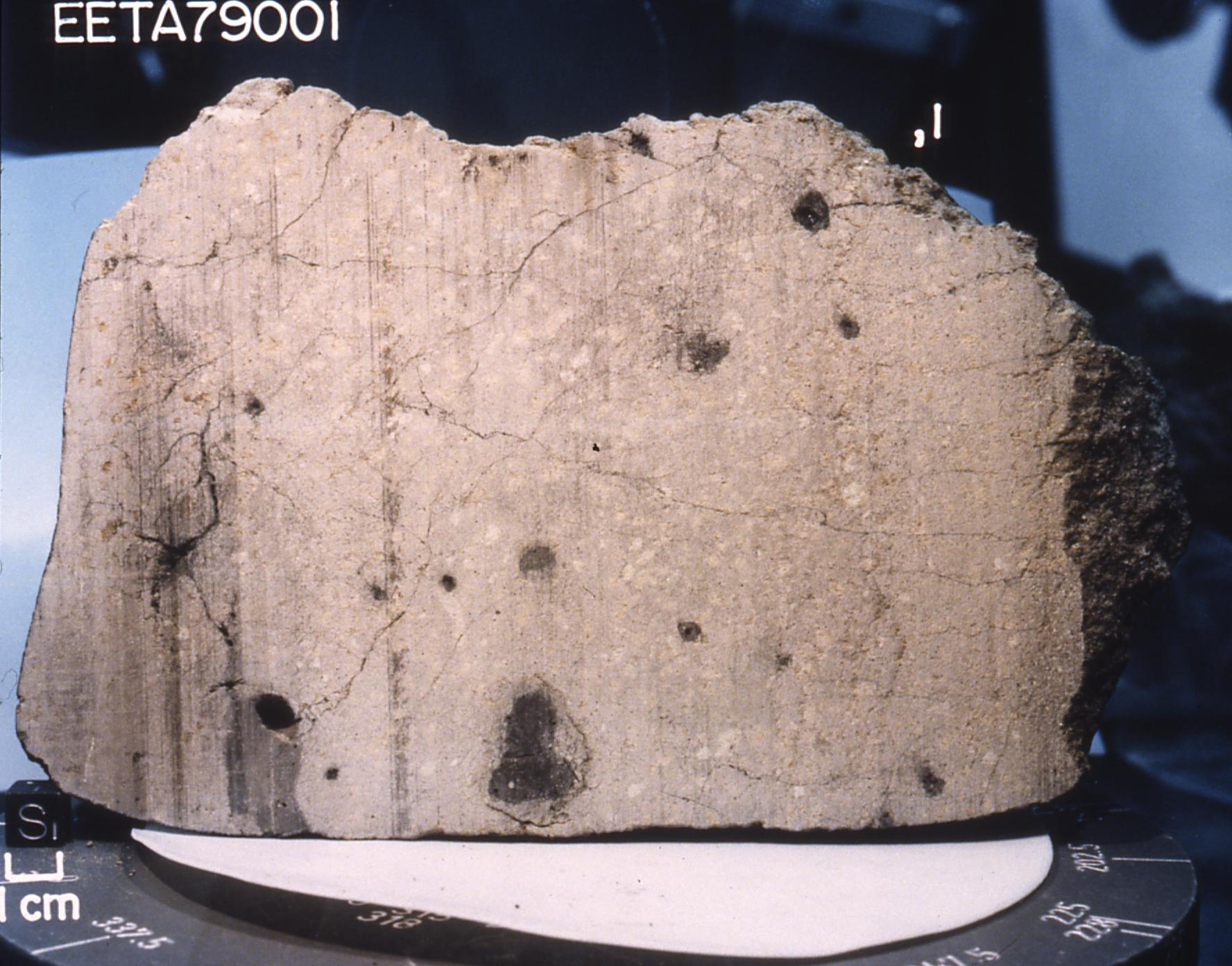
- Martian meteorite EETA79001, shergottite
- Type: Achondrite
- Subgroups: Shergottite; Basaltic; Lherzolite; Nakhlite; Chassignite; Orthopyroxenite; Basaltic Breccia
- Parent body: Mars
- Total known specimens: 277 as of 15 September 2020
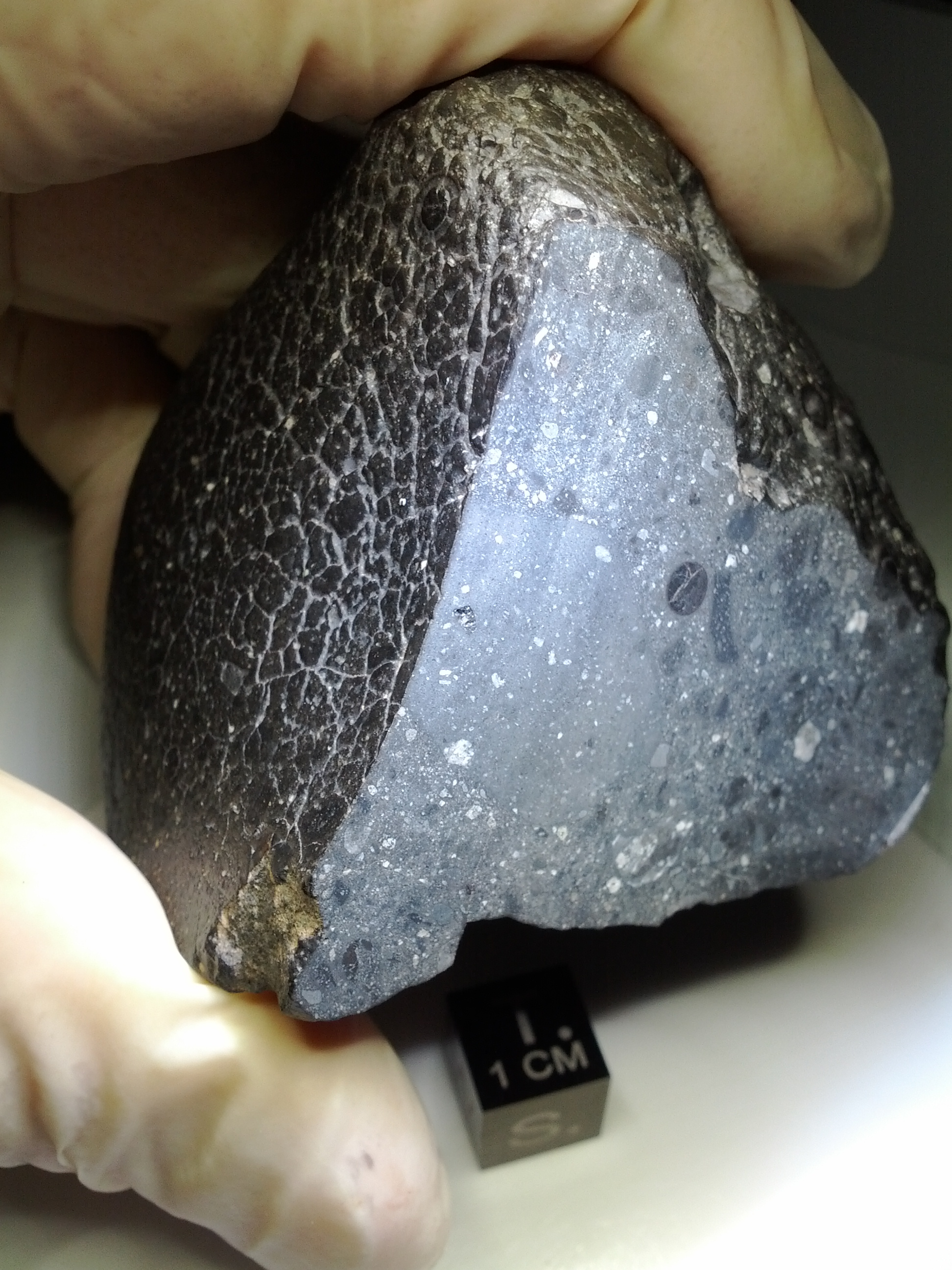
- Martian meteorite NWA 7034, nicknamed "Black Beauty," weighs approximately 320 g (11 oz).

A Martian meteorite is a rock that formed on Mars, was ejected from the planet by an impact event, and traversed interplanetary space before landing on Earth as a meteorite. As of September 2020, 277 meteorites had been classified as Martian, less than half a percent of the 72,000 meteorites that have been classified.

There are three groups of Martian meteorite: shergottites, nakhlites and chassignites, collectively known as SNC meteorites. Several other Martian meteorites are ungrouped. These meteorites are interpreted as Martian because they have elemental and isotopic compositions that are similar to rocks and atmospheric gases on Mars, which have been measured by orbiting spacecraft, surface landers and rovers. The term does not include meteorites found on Mars, such as Heat Shield Rock.

== History ==
By the early 1980s, it was obvious that the SNC group of meteorites (Shergottites, Nakhlites, and Chassignites) were significantly different from most other meteorite types. Among these differences were younger formation ages, a different oxygen isotopic composition, the presence of aqueous weathering products, and some similarity in chemical composition to analyses of the Martian surface rocks in 1976 by the Viking landers. Several scientists suggested these characteristics implied the origin of SNC meteorites from a relatively large parent body, possibly Mars.

Then in 1983, various trapped gases were reported in impact-formed glass of the EET79001 shergottite, gases which closely resembled those in the Martian atmosphere as analyzed by Viking. These trapped gases provided direct evidence for a Martian origin. In 2000, an article by Treiman, Gleason, and Bogard gave a survey of all the arguments used to conclude that the SNC meteorites (of which 14 had been found at the time) were from Mars. They wrote, "There seems little likelihood that the SNCs are not from Mars. If they were from another planetary body, it would have to be substantially identical to Mars as it now is understood."

== Subdivision ==
The Martian meteorites are divided into three groups (orange) and two grouplets (yellow). SHE = Shergottite, NAK = Nakhlite, CHA = Chassignite, OPX = Orthopyroxenite (ALH 84001), BBR = Basaltic Breccia (NWA 7034).

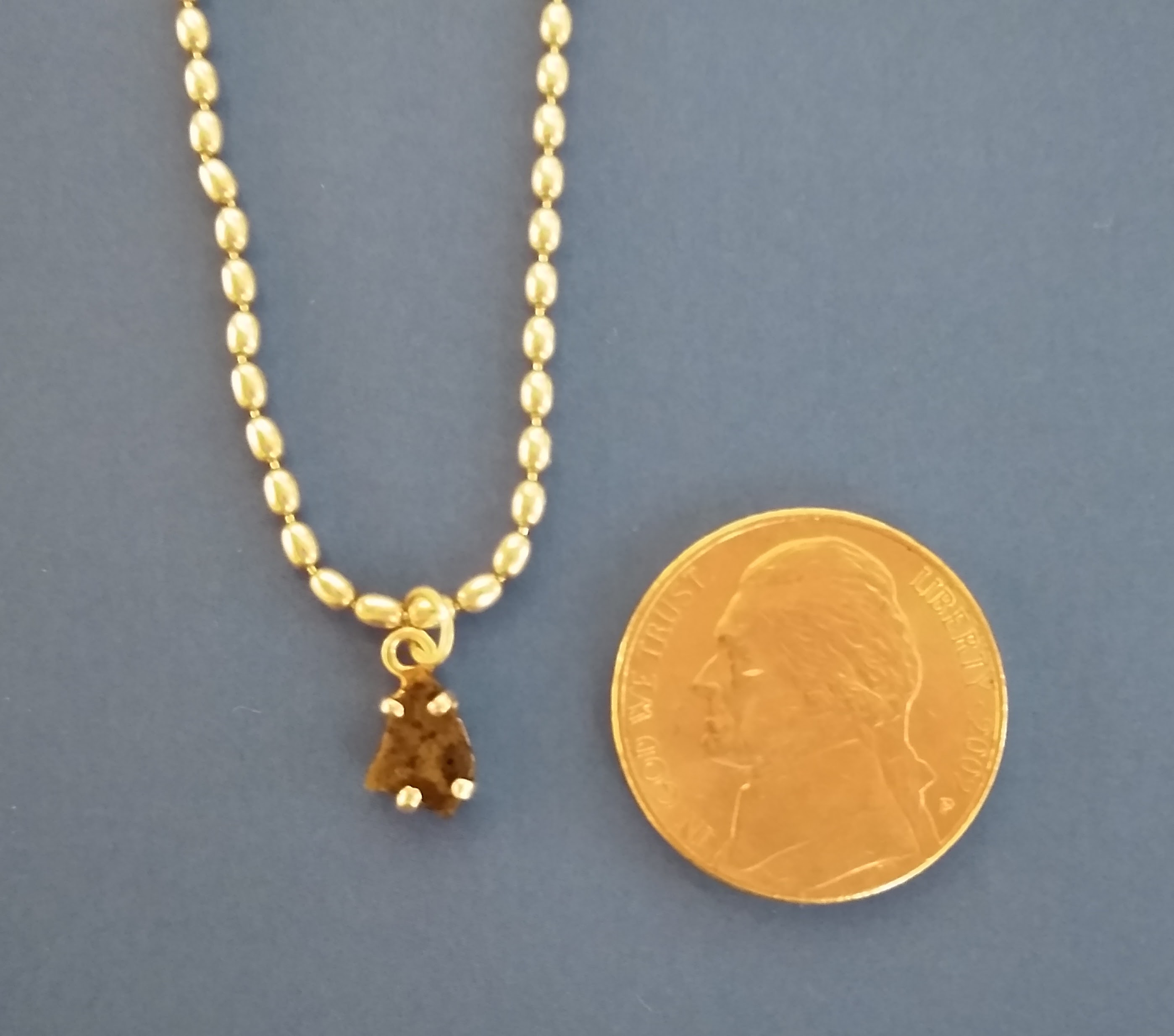
A Martian meteorite crafted into a small pendant and suspended from a silver necklace.

As of April 25, 2018, 192 of the 207 Martian meteorites are divided into three rare groups of achondritic (stony) meteorites: shergottites (169), nakhlites (20), chassignites (3), and ones otherwise (15) (containing the orthopyroxenite (OPX) Allan Hills 84001, as well as 10 basaltic breccia meteorites). Consequently, Martian meteorites as a whole are sometimes referred to as the SNC group (pronounced /snɪk/). They have isotope ratios that are consistent with each other and inconsistent with a terrestrial origin. The names derive from the location of where the first meteorite of their type was discovered.

=== Shergottites ===
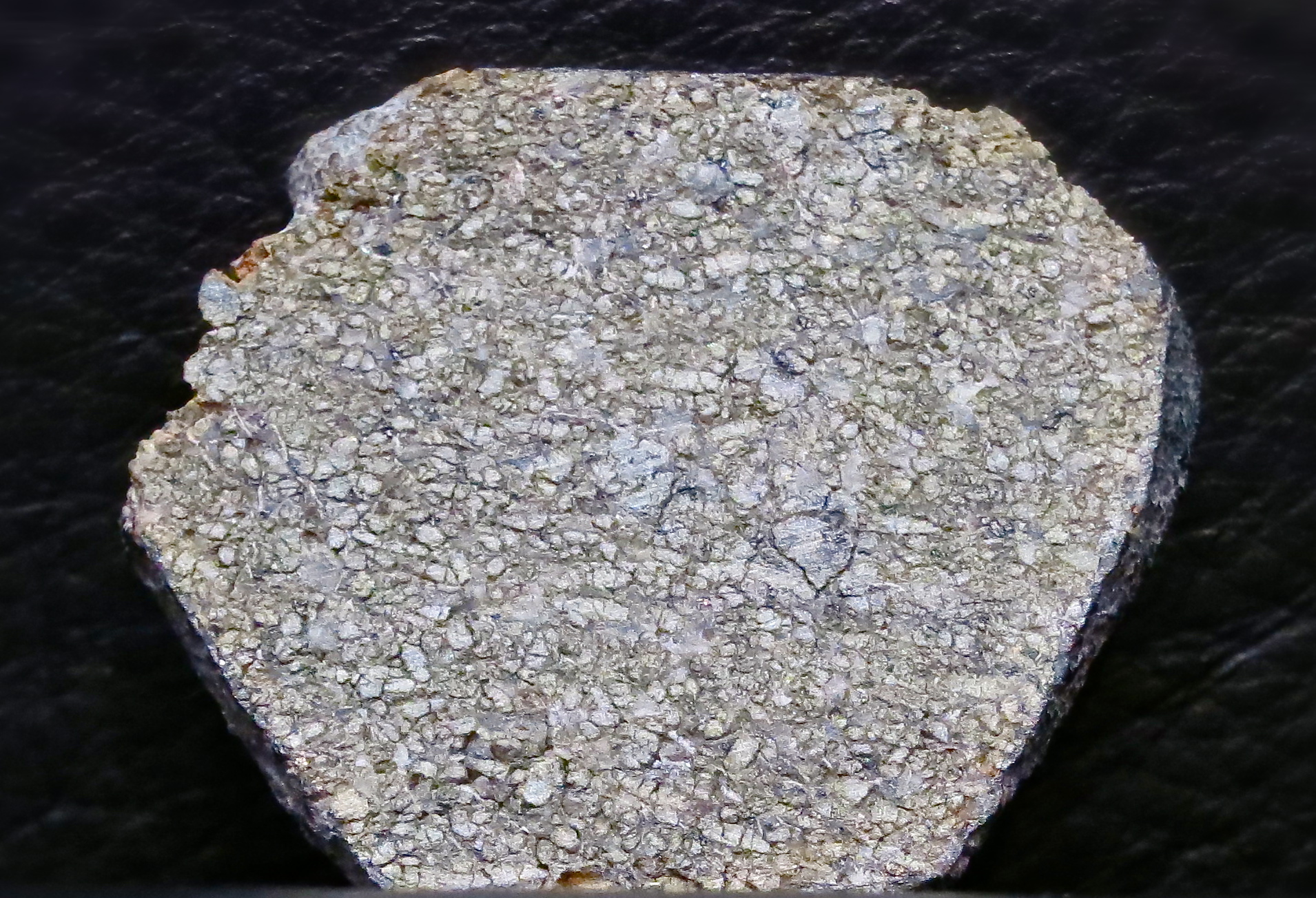
NWA 6963, a shergottite found in Morocco, September 2011.

Roughly three-quarters of all Martian meteorites can be classified as shergottites. They are named after the Shergotty meteorite, which fell at Sherghati, India in 1865. Shergottites are igneous rocks of mafic to ultramafic lithology. They fall into three main groups, the basaltic, olivine-phyric (such as the Tissint group found in Morocco in 2011) and lherzolitic shergottites, based on their crystal size and mineral content. They can be categorised alternatively into three or four groups based on their rare-earth element content. These two classification systems do not line up with each other, hinting at complex relationships between the various source rocks and magmas from which the shergottites formed.

The shergottites appear to have crystallised as recently as 180 million years ago, which is a surprisingly young age considering how ancient the majority of the surface of Mars appears to be, and the small size of Mars itself. Because of this, some have advocated the idea that the shergottites are much older than this. This "Shergottite Age Paradox" remains unsolved and is still an area of active research and debate.

It has been suggested the 3-million-year-old crater Mojave, 58.5 km in diameter, was a potential source of these meteorites. A paper published in 2021, however, disputes this, proposing instead the 28 km crater Tooting, or possibly the crater 09-000015 as the crater source of the depleted olivine-phyric shergottites ejected 1.1 Ma ago.

The second largest complete, uncut Martian meteorite, Taoudenni 002, was recovered in Mali in early 2021. It weighs 14.5 kilograms (32 pounds) and is on display at the Maine Mineral and Gem Museum.

=== Nakhlites ===
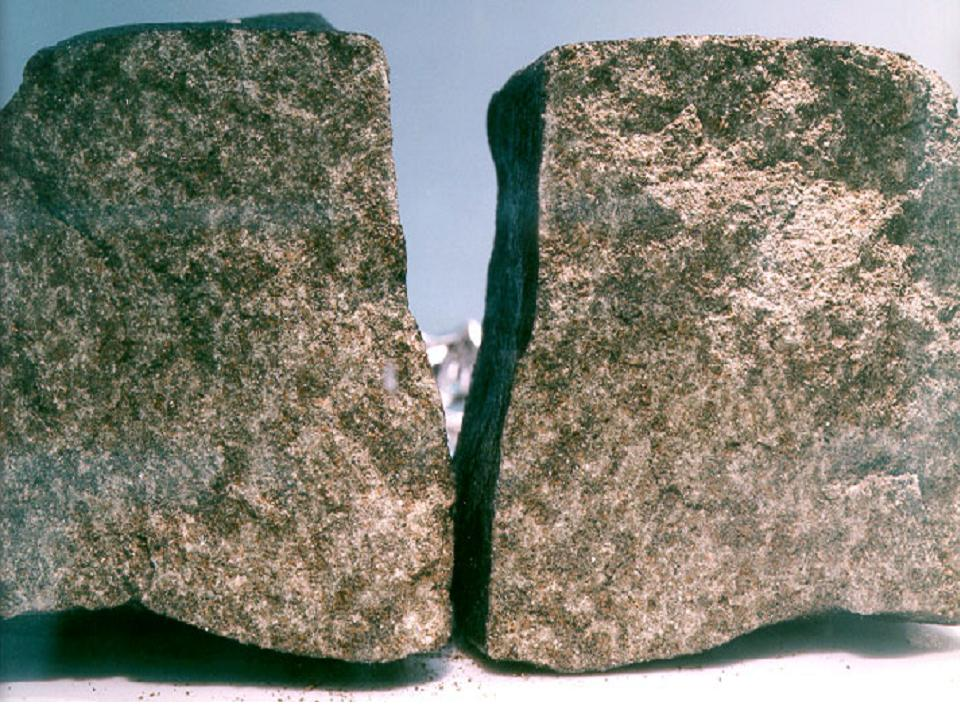
Nakhla meteorite's two sides and its inner surfaces after breaking it

Nakhlites are named after the first of them, the Nakhla meteorite, which fell in El-Nakhla, Alexandria, Egypt in 1911 and had an estimated weight of 10 kg.

Nakhlites are igneous rocks that are rich in augite and were formed from basaltic magma from at least four eruptions, spanning around 90 million years, from 1416 ± 7 to 1322 ± 10 million years ago. They contain augite and olivine crystals. Their crystallization ages, compared to a crater count chronology of different regions on Mars, suggest the nakhlites formed on the large volcanic construct of either Tharsis, Elysium, or Syrtis Major Planum.

It has been shown that the nakhlites were suffused with liquid water around 620 million years ago and that they were ejected from Mars around 10.75 million years ago by an asteroid impact. They fell to Earth within the last 10,000 years.

=== Chassignites ===
The first chassignite, the Chassigny meteorite, fell at Chassigny, Haute-Marne, France in 1815. There has been only one other chassignite recovered, named Northwest Africa (NWA) 2737. NWA 2737 was found in Morocco or Western Sahara in August 2000 by meteorite hunters Bruno Fectay and Carine Bidaut, who gave it the temporary name "Diderot." It was shown by Beck et al. that its "mineralogy, major and trace element chemistry as well as oxygen isotopes revealed an unambiguous Martian origin and strong affinities with Chassigny."

=== Ungrouped meteorites ===
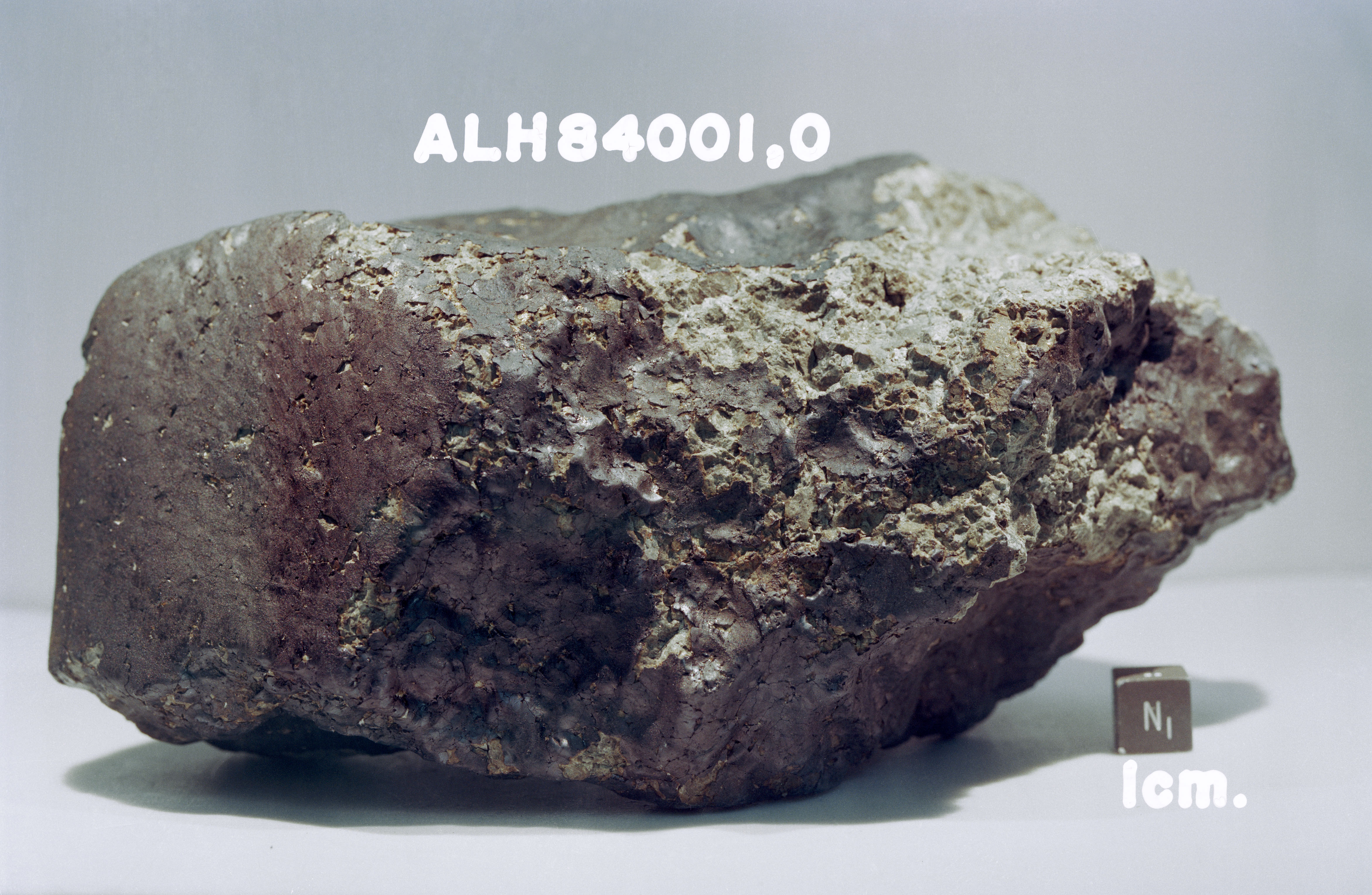
Allan Hills 84001 (ALH 84001)

Among these, the famous specimen Allan Hills 84001 has a different rock type from other Martian meteorites: it is an orthopyroxenite (an igneous rock dominantly composed of orthopyroxene). For this reason, it is classified within its group, the "OPX Martian meteorites". This meteorite received much attention after an electron microscope revealed structures that were considered to be the fossilized remains of bacteria-like lifeforms. As of 2005, scientific consensus was that the microfossils were not indicative of Martian life, but of contamination by earthly biofilms. ALH 84001 is as old as the basaltic and intermediate shergottite groups – i.e., 4.1 billion years old.

In March 2004 it was suggested that the unique Kaidun meteorite, which landed in Yemen on December 3, 1980, may have originated on the Martian moon of Phobos. Because Phobos has similarities to C-type asteroids and because the Kaidun meteorite is a carbonaceous chondrite, Kaidun is not a Martian meteorite in the strict sense. However, it may contain small fragments of material from the Martian surface.

The Martian meteorite NWA 7034 (nicknamed "Black Beauty"), found in the Sahara desert during 2011, has ten times the water content of other Mars meteorites found on Earth. The meteorite contains components as old as 4.42 ± 0.07 Ga (billion years), and was heated during the Amazonian geologic period on Mars.

The Suizhou meteorite, which fell in 1986 in Dayanpo, China, contained a magnesium silicate mineral called "Elgoresyte", a mineral not found on Earth.

== Origin ==
The majority of SNC meteorites are quite young compared to most other meteorites and seem to imply that volcanic activity was present on Mars only a few hundred million years ago. The young formation ages of Martian meteorites was one of the early recognized characteristics that suggested their origin from a planetary body such as Mars. Among Martian meteorites, ALH 84001, NWA 7034 and Teghaza 001 have radiometric ages older than about 1400 Ma (Ma = million years). All nakhlites, as well as Chassigny and NWA 2737, give similar if not identical formation ages around 1300 Ma, as determined by various radiometric dating techniques. Formation ages determined for many shergottites are variable and much younger, mostly ~150–575 Ma.

In 2022, the shergottite Teghaza 001 was found in the Sahara desert in Mali. Research published in 2026 found that the rock formed more than 4.1 billion years ago. The rose-colored rock contains zircon crystals and a mixture of igneous minerals, including feldspar and pyroxene. Analysis of its mineral composition and isotopes of oxygen and hydrogen revealed evidence of interactions between water and rock in ancient Martian crust.

The chronological history of shergottites is not totally understood, and a few scientists have suggested that some may have formed prior to the times given by their radiometric ages, a suggestion not accepted by most scientists. Formation ages of SNC meteorites are often linked to their cosmic-ray exposure (CRE) ages, as measured from the nuclear products of interactions of the meteorite in space with energetic cosmic ray particles. Thus, all measured nakhlites give essentially identical CRE ages of approximately 11 Ma, which, when combined with their possible identical formation ages, indicates ejection of nakhlites into space from a single location on Mars by a single impact event. Some of the shergottites also seem to form distinct groups according to their CRE ages and formation ages, again indicating ejection of several different shergottites from Mars by a single impact. However, CRE ages of shergottites vary considerably (~0.5–19 Ma), and several impact events are required to eject all the known shergottites. It had been asserted that there are no large young craters on Mars that are candidates as sources for the Martian meteorites, but subsequent studies claimed to have a likely source for ALH 84001, and a possible source for other shergottites.

In a 2014 paper, several researchers claimed that all Shergottite meteorites come from the Mojave Crater on Mars.

=== Age estimates based on cosmic ray exposure ===
The amount of time spent in transit from Mars to Earth can be estimated by measurements of the effect of cosmic radiation on the meteorites, particularly on isotope ratios of noble gases. The meteorites cluster in families that seem to correspond to distinct impact events on Mars. It is thought that the meteorites all originate in relatively few impacts every few million years on Mars. The impactors would be kilometers in diameter, and the craters they form on Mars would be tens of kilometers in diameter. Models of impacts on Mars are consistent with these findings.

Ages since impact determined so far include

Type	Age (mya)
Dhofar 019, olivine-phyric shergottite	19.8 ± 2.3
ALH 84001, orthopyroxenite	15.0 ± 0.8
Dunite (Chassigny)	11.1 ± 1.6
Six nakhlites	10.8 ± 0.8
Lherzolites	3.8–4.7
Six basaltic shergottites	2.4–3.0
Five olivine-phyric shergottites	1.2 ± 0.1
EET 79001	0.73 ± 0.15

== Possible evidence of life ==
Several Martian meteorites have been found to contain what some think is evidence for fossilized Martian life forms. The most significant of these is a meteorite found in the Allan Hills of Antarctica (ALH 84001). Ejection from Mars seems to have taken place about 16 million years ago. Arrival on Earth was about 13,000 years ago. Cracks in the rock appear to have filled with carbonate materials (implying groundwater was present) between 4 and 3.6 billion years ago. Evidence of polycyclic aromatic hydrocarbons (PAHs) have been identified with the levels increasing away from the surface. Other Antarctic meteorites do not contain PAHs. Earthly contamination should presumably be highest at the surface. Several minerals in the crack fill are deposited in phases, specifically, iron deposited as magnetite, which are claimed to be typical of biodepositation on Earth. There are also small ovoid and tubular structures that might be nanobacteria fossils in carbonate material in crack fills (investigators McKay, Gibson, Thomas-Keprta, Zare). Micropaleontologist Schopf, who described several important terrestrial bacterial assemblages, examined ALH 84001 and opined that the structures are too small to be Earthly bacteria and do not look especially like lifeforms to him. The size of the objects is consistent with Earthly "nanobacteria", but the existence of nanobacteria itself has been largely discredited.

Many studies disputed the validity of the fossils. For example, it was found that most of the organic matter in the meteorite was of terrestrial origin. But, a 2009 study suggests that magnetite in the meteorite could have been produced by Martian microbes. The study, published in the Journal of the Geochemical and Meteoritic Society, used more advanced high-resolution electron microscopy than was possible in 1996. A serious difficulty with the claims for a biogenic origin of the magnetites is that the majority of them exhibit topotactic crystallographic relationships with the host carbonates (i.e., there are 3D orientation relationships between the magnetite and carbonate lattices), which is strongly indicative that the magnetites have grown in-situ by a physico-chemical mechanism.

While water is no indication of life, many of the meteorites found on Earth have shown water, including NWA 7034 which formed during the Amazonian period of Martian geological history. Other signs of surface liquid water on Mars (such as recurring slope lineae) are a topic of debate among planetary scientists, but generally consistent with the earlier evidence provided by Martian meteorites. Any liquid water present is likely too minimal to support life.

== See also ==
- Colin Pillinger
- Glossary of meteoritics
- List of Martian meteorites (on Earth)
- List of meteorites on Mars
- Lithopanspermia, speculation that life on Earth may have arrived as microbes on Martian meteorites
- Mars sample-return mission
