= Sherghati =

- Town
- Sherghati
- Location in Bihar, India
- Coordinates: 24°33′42″N 84°47′43″E
- Country: India
- State: Bihar
- District: Gaya
- Named for: Tiger Valley
- Elevation: 121 m (397 ft)

Population (2011)
  - Total: 40,666 (As of 2,011 Census Date) (4 Lakhs+ Approximately as of 2,024 out which 30% are Muslim)
- Time zone: UTC+5:30 (IST)
- Postal code: 824211

Sherghati is a town in the Gaya district in Bihar (formally Magadha), India. The Morhar River surrounds it. A meteorite that came from Mars fell here on 25 August 1865; it is now kept in a London museum, and is known as the Shergotty meteorite.

Sherghati was under Chero rule but in 1662 it under control of Nawab Daud Ali Khan. After 1700, During 1727 it came under the rule of Rohilla chief Nawwab Azam Khan Rohilla. 1n 1762 Raja Ghulam Hussain Khan become King of Pargana SHERGHATI. He had absolute control over his subject. He considered it infringement to give any levy to the EIC East India Company. He participated in the revolts of 1765, 1781 and 1783 importantly., alongwith Raja Deo and Raja Ramgarh.

The Britishers imposed extremely heavy taxes to punish and weaken their economy and reduce their power to resist and fight against the Britishers. They introduced 10/11th lagaan, permanent settlement 1793 and Sunset rules to cripple the powers of the revolting Kings and Zamindars of Bihar.

In 1857, Raja Jehangir Bux Khan, of this family, revolted against the British. He cooperated, coordinated with Raja Kunwar Singh, Haidar Ali Khan and JEODHAR Singh. He led attacks also against the Britishers and their headquarters.

== Demographics ==
Religions in Sherghati town
Religion	Percent
Hindus	62.54%
Muslims	37.18%
Others	0.27%

As of 2011, Sherghati had a population of 40,666. Males constitute 52% of the population and females 42%. Sherghati has an average literacy rate of 74.3%, more than the national average of 74.04%. In Sherghati, 16% of the population is under 6 years of age.

== Geography ==
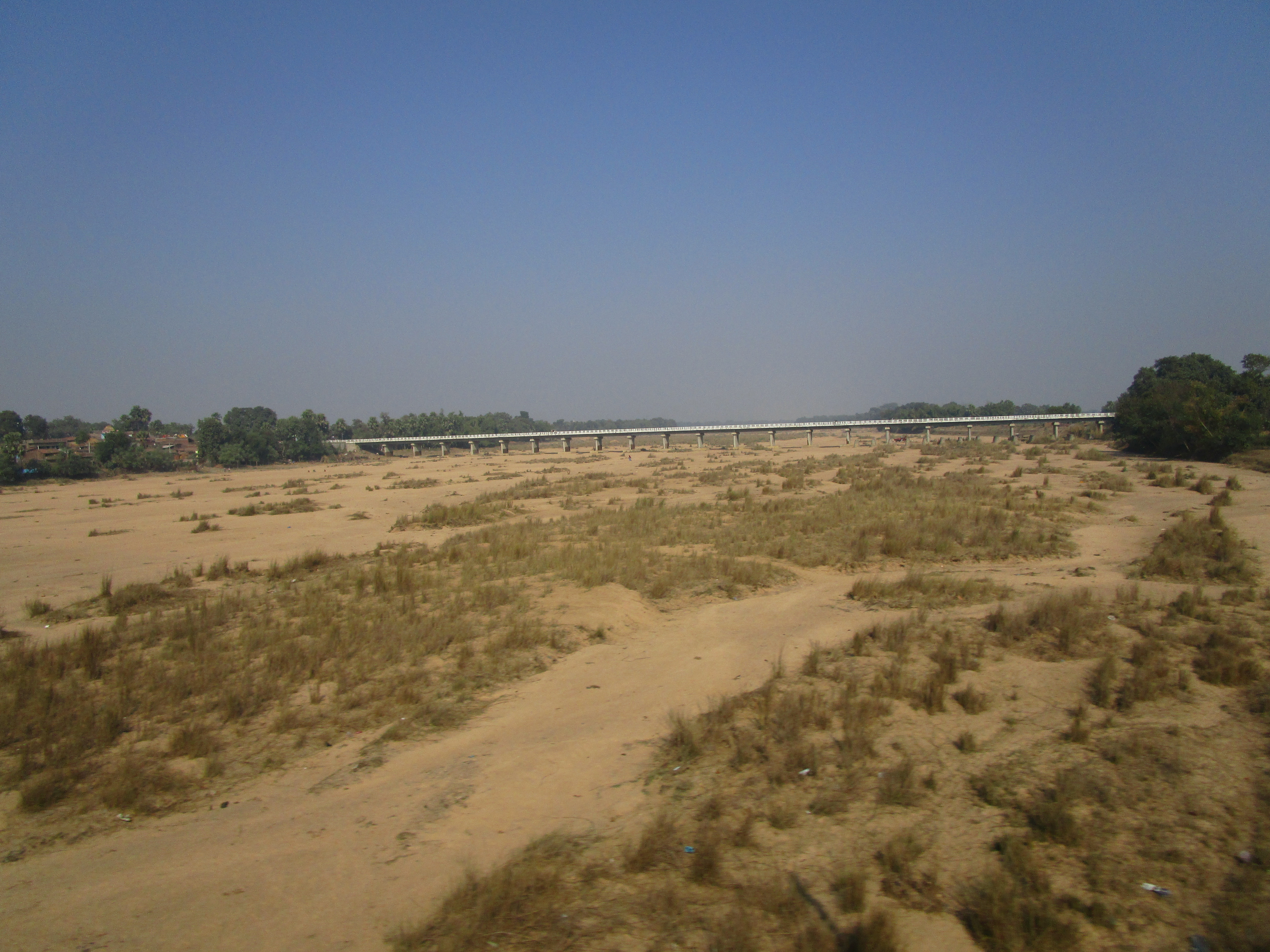
Morhar River at Paraiya, Bihar

Sherghati has an average elevation of 121 metres (396 feet).
