= List of mountains of East Antarctica =

The list of mountains of East Antarctica includes the highest mountains in East Antarctica.

Name	Elevation (meters)	Prominence (meters)	Range	Parent Range
Dome A	4093	1639	Dome A	East Antarctic Ice Sheet
Mount Marston	1245			
Nilsen Plateau	3938	1500	Antarctic Plateau	East Antarctic Ice Sheet
Dome F	3810		Dome F	East Antarctic Ice Sheet
Mount Menzies	3355		Prince Charles Mountains	East Antarctic Ice Sheet
Dome C	3233		Dome C	East Antarctic Ice Sheet
Jøkulkyrkja Mountain	3148		Mühlig-Hofmann Mountains	Fimbulheimen
Titan Dome	3106		Antarctic Plateau	East Antarctic Ice Sheet
Kyrkjeskipet Peak	3085		Mühlig-Hofmann Mountains	Fimbulheimen
Sandeggtind Peak	3055		Orvin Mountains	Fimbulheimen
Gessner Peak	3020		Mühlig-Hofmann Mountains	Fimbulheimen
Mount Widerøe	2994		Sør Rondane Mountains	
Zwiesel Mountain	2970		Wohlthat Mountains	Fimbulheimen
Gneiskopf Peak	2930		Wohlthat Mountains	Fimbulheimen
Sloknuten Peak	2765		Mühlig-Hofmann Mountains	Fimbulheimen
Isachsen Mountain	2750		Sør Rondane Mountains	
Breplogen Mountain	2725		Mühlig-Hofmann Mountains	Fimbulheimen
Paalnibba	2711		Sivorgfjella	Heimefront Range
Jahntinden	2709		Sivorgfjella	Heimefront Range
Risemedet Mountain	2705		Mühlig-Hofmann Mountains	Fimbulheimen
Shatskiy Hill	2705		Weyprecht Mountains	Fimbulheimen
Borg Massif	2700		Ritscher Upland	
Terningen Peak	2680		Mühlig-Hofmann Mountains	Fimbulheimen
Mount Krüger	2655		Sverdrup Mountains	Fimbulheimen
Poulssonhamaren	2650		Sivorgfjella	Heimefront Range
Rivenæsnuten	2633		Sivorgfjella	Heimefront Range
Lierjuven	2620		Sivorgfjella	Heimefront Range
Mount Victor	2590		Belgica Mountains	
Ryghnuten	2589		Sivorgfjella	Heimefront Range
Mount Van Mieghem	2572		Belgica Mountains	
Mount Solvay	2564		Belgica Mountains	
Malmrusta	2561		Sivorgfjella	Heimefront Range
Bjørnnutane	2555		XU-fjella	Heimefront Range
Mount Boë	2534		Belgica Mountains	
Mount van der Essen	2531		Belgica Mountains	
Deromfjellet	2525		Sør Rondane Mountains	
Mount Rossel	2512		Belgica Mountains	
Mount Fukushima	2494		Queen Fabiola Mountains	
Mount Collard	2492		Belgica Mountains	
Mount Hoge	2491		Belgica Mountains	
Mount Dallmann	2485		Orvin Mountains	Fimbulheimen
Mount Lahaye	2484		Belgica Mountains	
Mount Launoit	2478		Belgica Mountains	
Mount Gillet	2475		Belgica Mountains	
Mount Fukushima	2470		Queen Fabiola Mountains	
Mount Brouwer	2466		Belgica Mountains	
Mount Gaston de Gerlache	2450		Queen Fabiola Mountains	
Mount Imbert	2449		Belgica Mountains	
Mount Kirkby	2438		Prince Charles Mountains	East Antarctic Ice Sheet
Mount Bastin	2429		Belgica Mountains	
Mount Loodts	2429		Belgica Mountains	
Mount Paulus	2428		Belgica Mountains	
Mount Kerckhove de Denterghem	2427		Belgica Mountains	
Mount Perov	2402		Belgica Mountains	
Caussinknappen	2401		Sør Rondane Mountains	
Goolsnuten	2401		Sør Rondane Mountains	
Mount Derom	2390		Queen Fabiola Mountains	
Mount Verhaegen	2383		Belgica Mountains	
Mount Lorette	2355		Belgica Mountains	
Mount Limburg Stirum	2351		Belgica Mountains	
Mount Maere	2325		Belgica Mountains	
Mount Elkins	2300		Enderby Land	Wilkes Land
Mount Sfinx	2294		Belgica Mountains	
Tonynuten	2287		Sør Rondane Mountains	
Mount Eyskens	2273		Queen Fabiola Mountains	
Mount Goossens	2263		Queen Fabiola Mountains	
Sumnerkammen	2255		Tottanfjella	Heimefront Range
Mathisenskaget	2226		Sivorgfjella	Heimefront Range
Norumnuten	2224		Sivorgfjella	Heimefront Range
Mount Van Pelt	2213		Queen Fabiola Mountains	
Mount Pierre	2213		Queen Fabiola Mountains	
Schivestolen	2159		Milorgfjella	Heimefront Range
Wrighthamaren	2154		Sivorgfjella	Heimefront Range
Maquetknausane	2144		Sør Rondane Mountains	
Van Autenboerfjellet	2142		Sør Rondane Mountains	
Mount Vanderheyden	2129		Belgica Mountains	
Nevlingen Peak	2100		Dome F	East Antarctic Ice Sheet
Mount Hulshagen	2094		Belgica Mountains	
Gramkroken	2092		Sivorgfjella	Heimefront Range
Mount De Breuck	2089		Queen Fabiola Mountains	
Cumpston Massif	2070		Christensen Coast	Wilkes Land
Berckmanskampen	2063		Sør Rondane Mountains	
Blaiklockfjellet	2061		Sør Rondane Mountains	
Strømnæsberget	2034		XU-fjella	Heimefront Range
Lauringrabben	2033		Milorgfjella	Heimefront Range
Verheyefjellet	2000		Sør Rondane Mountains	

== See also ==
- List of mountains of Queen Maud Land
- List of mountains of Enderby Land
- List of mountains of Mac. Robertson Land
- List of mountains of Princess Elizabeth Land
- List of mountains of Wilkes Land
