= Gerlache (disambiguation) =

Gerlache or Gerlach may refer to:

People

- Adrien de Gerlache (1866 — 1934), Belgian polar explorer
- Étienne Constantin de Gerlache (1785 — 1871), first Belgian prime minister
- Gaston de Gerlache (1919 — 2006), Belgian polar explorer
- Saint Gerlach (died c. 1170), Dutch hermit

Places

- 69434 de Gerlache, asteroid
- Cape Gerlache, Antarctica
- De Gerlache (crater), lunar crater
- De Gerlache Seamounts, Antarctica
- Gerlache Inlet, Antarctica
- Gerlache Island, Antarctica
- Gerlache Strait, Antarctica
- Mount Gaston de Gerlache, Antarctica
- Mount Gerlache, Antarctica
- Pic de Gerlache, NE Greenland
