= Giaever Glacier =

Glacier in Antarctica

- Location of Queen Maud Land in Antarctica

- Location within Antarctica
- Location: Queen Maud Land
- Coordinates: 72°37′S 31°8′E
- Thickness: unknown
- Terminus: Belgica Mountains
- Status: unknown

Giaever Glacier (72°37′S 31°8′E) is a glacier flowing northwest between Mount Kerckhove de Denterghem and Mount Lahaye in the Belgica Mountains of Antarctica. It was discovered by the Belgian Antarctic Expedition, 1957–58, under Gaston de Gerlache, who named it for Norwegian explorer John Schjelderup Giæver, counselor for the expedition, and leader of the Norwegian–British–Swedish Antarctic Expedition, 1949–52.

== See also ==
- List of glaciers in the Antarctic
- Glaciology
