= Torii Glacier =

Glacier in Antarctica

- Location of Queen Maud Land in Antarctica

- Location within Antarctica
- Location: Queen Maud Land
- Coordinates: 71°19′S 35°38′E
- Thickness: unknown
- Terminus: Queen Fabiola Mountains
- Status: unknown

Torii Glacier (71°19′S 35°38′E) is a glacier flowing northwest between Mount Goossens and Mount Fukushima in the Queen Fabiola Mountains. Discovered on October 7, 1960, by the Belgian Antarctic Expedition, under Guido Derom, who named it after Tetsuya Torii, geochemist; leader of the Japanese party that visited this area in November 1960.

== See also ==
- List of glaciers in the Antarctic
- Glaciology
