= Mount Maere =

Mountain in Queen Maud Land, Antarctica

Mount Maere (72°32′S 31°17′E) is a mountain, 2,300 metres (7,500 ft) high, on the west side of Norsk Polarinstitutt Glacier immediately southwest of Mount Bastin, in the Belgica Mountains of Antarctica. It was discovered by the Belgian Antarctic Expedition, 1957–58, under G. de Gerlache, who named it for Xavier de Maere d'Aertrijcke, second-in-command and chief meteorologist of the expedition.
