= Christiaensen Glacier =

Glacier in Antarctica

- Location of Queen Maud Land in Antarctica

- Location within Antarctica
- Location: Queen Maud Land
- Coordinates: 71°32′S 35°37′E
- Thickness: unknown
- Terminus: Queen Fabiola Mountains
- Status: unknown

Christiaensen Glacier (71°32′S 35°37′E) is a glacier that drains westward between Mount Eyskens and Mount Derom, in the Queen Fabiola Mountains. It was discovered on October 7, 1960 by the Belgian Antarctic Expedition under Guido Derom, who named it for Leo Christiaensen, captain of the polar vessel Erika Dan which brought the Belgian expedition to Antarctica.

== See also ==
- List of glaciers in the Antarctic
- Glaciology
