= Polly Penhale =

American biologist

Polly A. Penhale is an American biologist and Environmental Officer at the National Science Foundation. She is a leading figure in Antarctic research, and has been recognized for contributions to research, policy, and environmental conservation. Penhale Peak in Antarctica is named for her.

== Early life and education ==
Penhale was born in St. Louis. She earned a BA from Earlham College in 1970, followed by an MS and PhD at North Carolina State University, where she specialized in marine biology.

== Career and impact ==
Penhale’s career has spanned research, education, conservation, and advocacy. She has worked in the US and internationally to preserve polar ecosystems, and has played a key role in facilitating scientific research in the polar regions through the US National Science Foundation (NSF). As Environmental Officer for the NSF, Penhale manages environmental oversight and stewardship for US activities in Antarctica, including environmental assessment. She also is responsible for reviewing research proposals and making funding decisions related to Antarctic research. She played a key role in establishment of the conservation-focused Long Term Ecological Research (LTER) program at Palmer Station, Antarctica.

Penhale’s early career was focused on marine biology. She worked in a number of ocean and coastal areas, including Alaska, Florida, the Caribbean, and Chesapeake Bay, holding post-docs at Miami’s Rosenstiel School of Marine Science (1976-1977) and the Kellogg Biological Station (1977-1979). She joined the faculty of the College of William and Mary’s Virginia Institute of Marine Science in 1979, and was a visiting scientist and Assistant Program Director at the NSF from 1982-1985; she later began working for the National Science Foundation in 1986, as program manager for Polar Biology and Medicine.

Penhale also served as Secretary of the American Society of Limnology and Oceanography (now the Association for the Sciences of Limnology and Oceanography), 1985-1997, and the President of the Antarctican Society, 1992-1994. She has been a member of the US Delegation to the Convention for the Conservation of Antarctic Marine Living Resources (CCAMLR), through which she played a central role in writing and reviewing Antarctic protected area management plans, and is Vice-Chair and US Representative to the Committee for Environmental Protection, Antarctic Treaty.

== Awards ==
- Ocean Sciences Award, American Geophysical Union, 1998
- Earlham College Alumni Award, 2000
- The Finn Ronne Memorial Award, 2010
- ASLO Outstanding Achievement Award
- Edith (Jackie) Ronne Award for Antarctic Research (Society of Woman Geographers)

== Publications ==
- Penhale, P.A. 1972. Food requirements of the nine spine stickleback, Pungitius pungitius, in an arctic tundra lake of northern Alaska. M.S. thesis, North Carolina State University, Raleigh, North Carolina.
- Cameron, J.N., J. Kostoris, and P.A. Penhale. 1973. Preliminary energy budget of the ninespine stickleback (Pungitius pungitius) in an arctic lake. J. Fish. Res. Board Can. 30:1178-1189.
- Penhale, P.A. 1976. Primary productivity, dissolved organic carbon excretion and nutrient transport in an epiphyte-eelgrass (Zostera marina) system. Ph.D. dissertation, North Carolina State University, Raleigh, North Carolina.
- Penhale, P.A. and J.M. Sprogis. 1976. The role of epiphytes in seagrass systems. Univ. Miami Sea Grant Special Report 5:65-69.
- Penhale, P.A. 1977. Macrophyte-epiphyte biomass and productivity in an eelgrass (Zostera marina L.) community. J. Exp. Mar. Biol. Ecol. 26:211-224.
- Penhale, P.A. and W. O. Smith, Jr. 1977. Excretion of dissolved organic carbon by eelgrass (Zostera marina) and its epiphytes. Limnol. Oceanogr. 22:400-407.
- Capone, D.G., P.A. Penhale, R.S. Oremland, and B.F. Taylor. 1979. Relationship between productivity and N2 (C2H2) fixation in a Thalassia testudinum community. Limnol. Oceanogr. 24:117-125.
- Wetzel, R.G. and P.A. Penhale. 1979. Transport of carbon and excretion of dissolved organic carbon by leaves and roots/rhizomes in seagrasses and their epiphytes. Aquatic Bot. 6:149-158.
- Penhale, P.A. and G.T. Thayer. 1980. Uptake and transfer of carbon and phosphorus by eelgrass (Zostera marina L.) and its epiphytes. J. Exp. Mar. Biol. Ecol. 42:113-123.
- Smith, W.O., Jr. and P.A. Penhale. 1980. The heterotrophic uptake of dissolved organic carbon by eelgrass (Zostera marina L.) and its epiphytes. J. Exp. Mar. Biol. Ecol. 48:233-242.
- Penhale, P.A. and D.G. Capone. 1981. Primary productivity and nitrogen fixation in two macroalgae-cyanobacteria associations. Bull. Mar. Sci. 31:163-169.
- Wetzel, R.L. and P.A. Penhale. 1983. Production ecology of seagrass communities in the lower Chesapeake Bay. Mar. Tech. Soc. J. 17:22-31.
- Penhale, P.A. and R.G. Wetzel. 1983. Structural and functional adaptations of eelgrass (Zostera marina L.) to the anaerobic sediment environment. Can J. Bot. 61:1421-1428.
- Evans, A.S., K.L. Webb, and P.A. Penhale. 1986. Photosynthetic temperature acclimation in two co-existing seagrasses, Zostera marina L. and Ruppia maritima L. Aquat. Bot. 24:185-197.
- Penhale, P.A. 1986. Habitat value of seagrass beds for benthic invertebrates, pp. 161–166 in Biology of Benthic Marine Organisms (M.-F. Thompson, R. Sarojini, and R. Nagabhushanan, eds.), Oxford and IBH Publishing Co., New Delhi.
- Penhale, P.A. 1988. An ecological perspective of the seagrasses, pp. 439–448 in Marine Science of the Arabian Sea (M.-F. Thompson and N.M. Tirmizi, eds.), Alnoor Enterprises, Karachi.
- Kennicutt, M.C. et al. 1990. Oil Spillage in Antarctica. Environ. Sci. Technol. 24:620-624.
- Weiler, C.S. and P.A. Penhale (eds.). 1994. Ultraviolet radiation in Antarctica: Measurements and Biological Effects. American Geophysical Union, Vol. 62, Antarctic Research Series. 257 p.
- Booth, C.R., T.B. Lucas, J.H.. Morrow, C.S. Weiler, and P.A.Penhale. 1994. The United States National Science Foundation's polar network for monitoring ultraviolet radiation, pp. 17–37, in C.S. Weiler and P.A. Penhale (eds.). 1994. Ultraviolet radiation in Antarctica: Measurements and Biological Effects. American Geophysical Union, Vol. 62, Antarctic Research Series.
- Grant, S.M., P Koubbi, and P. Penhale. 2014. Conservation and Management, Chapter 9.4 in C. De Broyer, P. Koubbi, H.J. Griffiths, B. Raymond, C. d’Udekem d’Acoz, et al. (eds.) Biogeographic Atlas of the Southern Ocean.
