= Mount Solvay =

Mountain in Queen Maud Land, Antarctica

Mount Solvay (72°34′S 31°23′E) is a mountain, 2,560 m, close north of Mount Gillet in the Belgica Mountains. Discovered by the Belgian Antarctic Expedition, 1957–58, under Gaston de Gerlache, who named it for Ernest John Solvay, a patron of the expedition.
