= Mount Loodts =

Mountain in Queen Maud Land, Antarctica

Mount Loodts (72°32′S 31°11′E) is a mountain, 2,420 metres (7,940 ft) high, immediately east of Mount Lorette in the Belgica Mountains of Antarctica. It was discovered by the Belgian Antarctic Expedition, 1957–58, under G. de Gerlache, who named it for Jacques Loodts, geodesist with the expedition.
