= Penhale Peak =

Mountain in Antarctica

Penhale Peak (77°37′S 162°47′E) is a peak 0.8 nautical miles (1.5 km) east of Mount Torii on the north wall of Taylor Valley, Victoria Land. The peak rises to 1,600 m directly north of the west end of Lake Hoare. Named by Advisory Committee on Antarctic Names (US-ACAN) (1997) after Polly A. Penhale, biologist, Program Manager for Polar Biology and Medicine, Office of Polar Programs, National Science Foundation (NSF), from 1986; co-editor (with C. Susan Weiler) of Ultraviolet Radiation in Antarctica: Measurements and Biological Effects, American Geophysical Union, Washington, D.C., 1994.
