= Mount Kerckhove de Denterghem =

Mountain in Queen Maud Land, Antarctica

Mount Kerckhove de Denterghem (72°37′S 31°8′E) is a mountain, 2,400 metres (8,000 ft) high, just north of Mount Collard in the Belgica Mountains of Antarctica. It was discovered by the Belgian Antarctic Expedition, 1957–58, under G. de Gerlache, who named it for Count Charles de Kerchove de Denterghem, a patron of the expedition.
