= Mount Lorette =

Mountain in Queen Maud Land, Antarctica

Mount Lorette (72°32′S 31°9′E) is an ice-free mountain resembling a cathedral in form, rising to 2,200 metres (7,200 ft) close west of Mount Loodts in the Belgica Mountains of Antarctica. It was discovered by the Belgian Antarctic Expedition, 1957–58, under G. de Gerlache, who named it for Notre Dame de Lorette (Our Lady of Loreto), a patron saint of aviators.
