= Yamato 000593 =

Meteorite found in Antarctica

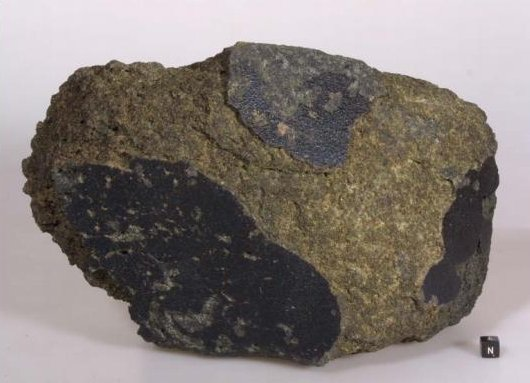
- Yamato 000593 meteorite—13.7 kg (30 lb). The cube is 1 cm (0.39 in) (NASA; 2012).
- Type: Achondrite
- Structural classification: Igneous
- Class: Martian meteorite
- Group: Nakhlite
- Composition: pyroxene 85% olivine 10%
- Shock stage: S3
- Weathering grade: B
- Country: Antarctica
- Region: Yamato Glacier
- Coordinates: 71°30′S 35°40′E
- Observed fall: No
- Fall date: 50,000 years ago
- Found date: 2000
- TKW: 13.7 kg (30 lb)
- Related media on Wikimedia Commons

Yamato 000593 (or Y000593) is the second largest meteorite from Mars found on Earth. Studies suggest the Martian meteorite was formed about 1.3 billion years ago from a lava flow on Mars. An impact occurred on Mars about 11 million years ago and ejected the meteorite from the Martian surface into space. The meteorite landed on Earth in Antarctica about 50,000 years ago. The mass of the meteorite is 13.7 kg (30 lb) and has been found to contain evidence of past water alteration.

At a microscopic level, areas of the meteorite with spheres are rich in carbon compared to surrounding areas lacking such spheres. The carbon-rich spheres and the observed micro-tunnels may have been formed by biotic activity, according to NASA scientists.

== Discovery and naming ==
The 41st Japanese Antarctic Research Expedition (JARE) found the meteorite in late December 2000 on the Yamato Glacier in the Queen Fabiola Mountains, Antarctica.

== Description ==
The mass of the meteorite is 13.7 kg (30 lb). It is an unbrecciated cumulus igneous rock consisting predominantly of elongated augite crystals—a solid solution in the pyroxene group. Japanese scientists from the National Institute of Polar Research reported in 2003 that the meteorite contains iddingsite, which forms from the weathering of basalt in the presence of liquid water. In addition, NASA researchers reported in February 2014 that they also found carbon-rich spheres encased in multiple layers of iddingsite, as well as microtubular features emanating from iddingsite veins displaying curved, undulating shapes consistent with bio-alteration textures that have been observed in terrestrial basaltic glass. However, the scientific consensus is that "morphology alone cannot be used unambiguously as a tool for primitive life detection." Interpretation of morphology is notoriously subjective, and its use alone has led to numerous errors of interpretation. According to the NASA team, the presence of carbon and lack of corresponding cations is consistent with the occurrence of organic matter embedded in iddingsite. The NASA researchers indicated that mass spectrometry may provide deeper insight into the nature of the carbon, and could distinguish between abiotic and biologic carbon incorporation and alteration.

== Classification ==
The Martian meteorite is an igneous rock classified as an achondrite type of the nakhlite group.

== Images ==
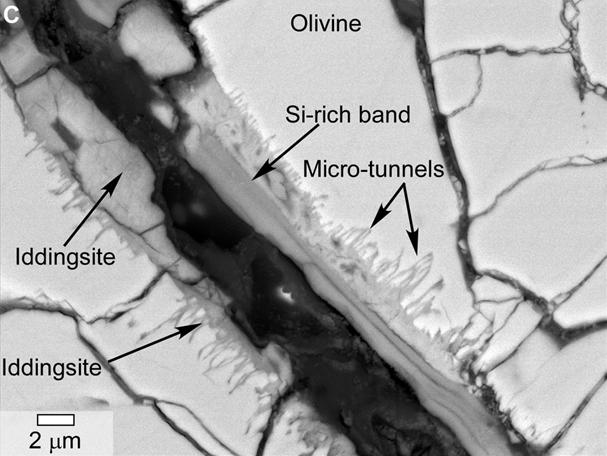
Microscopic image of Y000593 meteorite shows iddingsite as evidence of water alteration. It displays microtunnels that may have been formed by biotic activity (February 27, 2014).

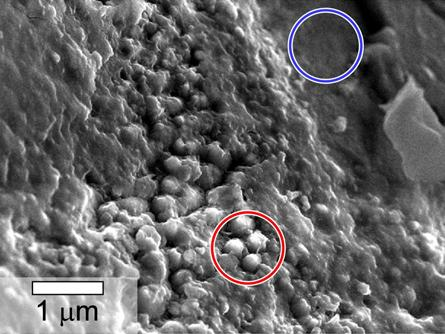
Y000593 has areas with spheres (red) that have twice the carbon as areas without spheres (blue) (February 27, 2014).

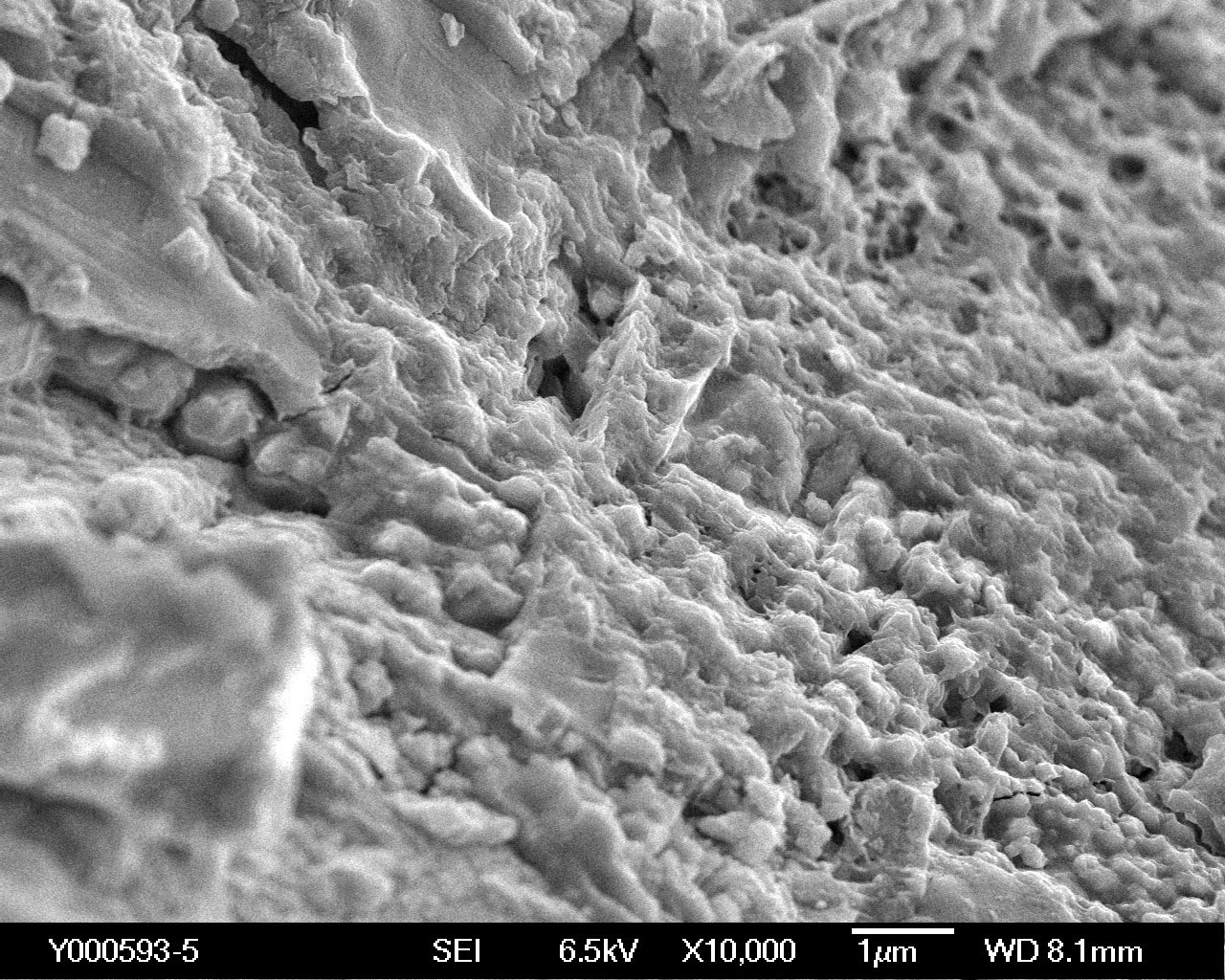
Microscopic image of the Nakhla-like surface of meteorite Yamato 000593 (November 2009).

== See also ==
- Allan Hills 84001
- Astrobiology
- Glossary of meteoritics
- Life on Mars
- List of Martian meteorites
- List of meteorites on Mars
- Nakhla meteorite
- Panspermia
