= Mount Paulus =

Mountain in Queen Maud Land, Antarctica

Mount Paulus (72°37′S 31°0′E) is a mountain, 2,420 m, close south of Mount Rossel in the southwest part of the Belgica Mountains. Discovered by a Belgian Antarctic expedition, 1957–58, under G. de Gerlache, who named it for Jean-Pierre Paulus, a patron of the expedition.
