= Mount Vanderheyden =

Mountain in Queen Maud Land, Antarctica

Mount Vanderheyden (72°30′S 31°20′E) is a 2,120 m tall mountain standing 1.5 nautical miles (2.8 km) northeast of Mount Bastin on the north side of the Belgica Mountains. It was discovered by the Belgian Antarctic Expedition, 1957–58, under G. de Gerlache. He named it for Henri Vanderheyden, an aircraft mechanic with the expedition.
