= Peter Ungar =

American paleoanthropologist (born 1963)

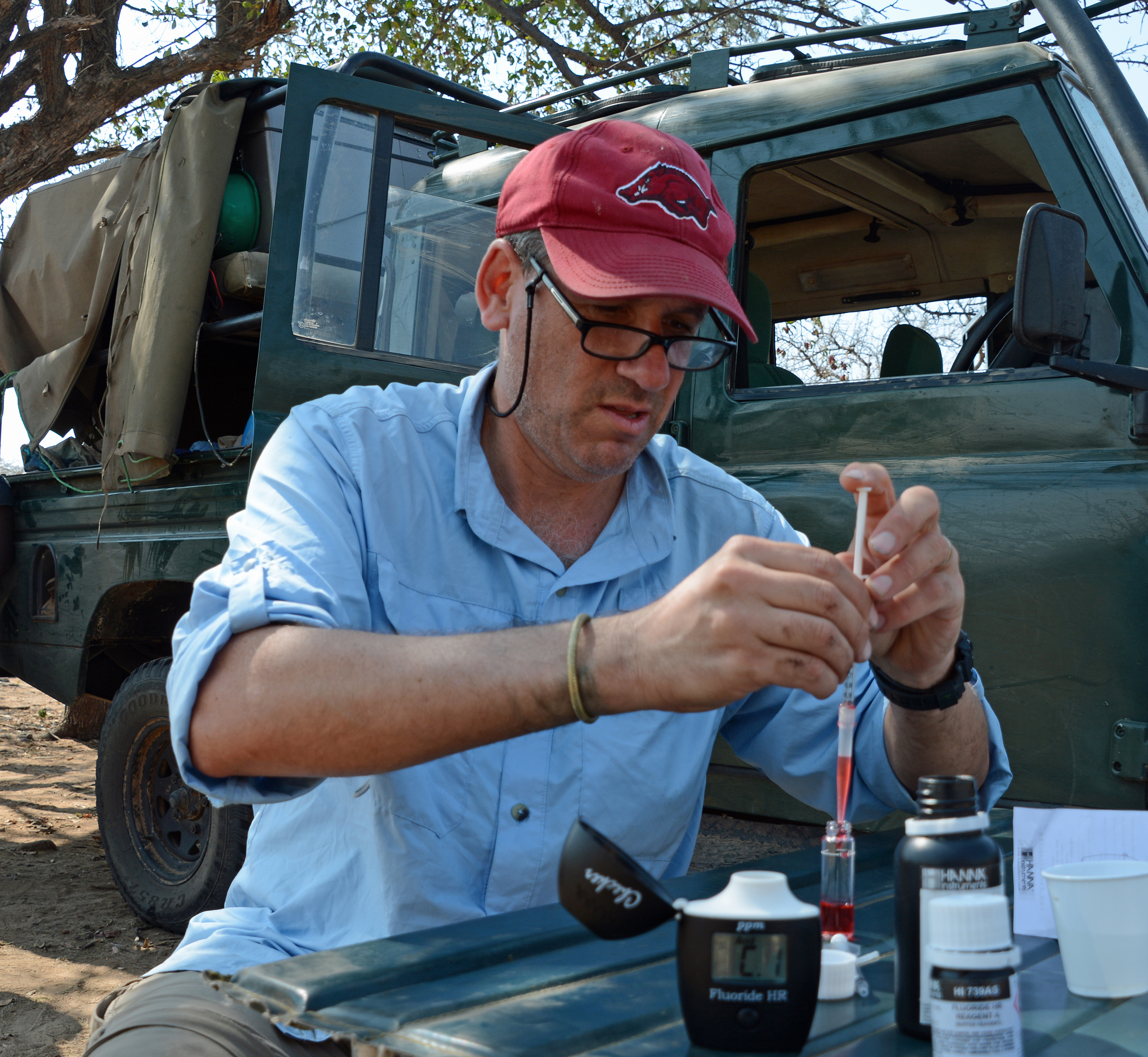
- Hadza water testing
- Born: May 4, 1963 (age 63); New York, New York
- Education: Binghamton University; Stony Brook University Ph.D.
- Known for: Reconstructing the diets of human ancestors
- Awards: US National Academy of Sciences and American Academy of Arts and Sciences Memberships, Southeastern Conference Faculty Achievement Award, Fulbright Foundation Specialist Awards to South Africa and to Finland, American Association for the Advancement of Science Fellowship, Johns Hopkins Society of Scholars Membership, Doctor et Professor Honoris Causa, Eötvös Loránd University.
- Scientific career
- Fields: Paleoanthropology, evolutionary biology
- Workplaces: University of Arkansas; Duke University; Johns Hopkins University
- Thesis: Incisor Microwear and Feeding Behavior of Four Sumatran Anthropoids (1992)
- Doctoral advisor: Frederick Grine; Richard Kay (postdoc); Alan Walker (postdoc)
- Website: ungarlab.uark.edu

Peter S. Ungar (born May 4, 1963) is an American paleoanthropologist and evolutionary biologist.

== Life ==
Peter S. Ungar is Distinguished Professor and Director of the Environmental Dynamics Program at the University of Arkansas. Before arriving at Arkansas, he taught at the Johns Hopkins School of Medicine and Duke University Medical Center.

Ungar is known primarily for his work on the role of diet in human evolution. He has spent thousands of hours observing wild apes and other primates in the rainforests of Latin America and Southeast Asia, studied fossils from tyrannosaurids to Neandertals, documented the oral health of the Hadza hunter-gatherers of Tanzania, and developed new techniques for using advanced surface analysis technologies to extract dietary information from tooth shape and wear patterns.

Ungar has written or coauthored more than 250 scientific works on ecology and evolution for books and journals including Nature, Science, Proceedings of the National Academy of Sciences, and Philosophical Transactions of the Royal Society. These have focused on food choices and feeding in living primates, and the role of diet in the evolution of human ancestors and other fossil species. His book Mammal Teeth: Origin, Evolution and Diversity won the PROSE Award for best book in the Biological Sciences, and he edited Evolution of the Human Diet: The Known, the Unknown and the Unknowable and coedited Human Diet: Its Origins and Evolution. His forays into popular science writing include Teeth: A Very Short Introduction, and his most recent trade book, Evolution's Bite: A Story about Teeth, Diet, and Human Origins.

Ungar's work has been featured in hundreds of electronic, print, and broadcast media outlets, and he appeared recently in documentaries on the Discovery Channel, BBC Television, and the Science Channel.

== Selected publications ==
- Han, Yuanyuan; Fehringer, Leah K.; Wang, Jian; Yao, Juanting; Garrett Kirkpatrick, A.; Scott, Jessica R.; Chen, Xiaocheng; Wang, Qianqian; Ungar, Peter S.; Zhang, Dongju (December 2024). "Paleodiet reconstruction of Procapra przewalskii from the Qinghai Lake Basin during the Early and Middle Holocene". Journal of Archaeological Science: Reports. 60 104808. doi:10.1016/j.jasrep.2024.104808 – via Elsevier Science Direct.
- Fan, Yaobin; Fehringer, Leah K.; Liao, Wei; Liang, Hua; Wang, Wei; Ungar, Peter S. (August 2024). "Dental microwear and diets of mainland fossil Pongo from the Mid-Pleistocene of southern China". Journal of Human Evolution. 193 103565. doi:10.1016/j.jhevol.2024.103565 – via Elsevier Science Direct.
- Ungar, Peter S.; Van Valkenburgh, Blaire; Peterson, Alexandria S.; Sokolov, Aleksandr A.; Sokolova, Natalia A.; Ehrich, Dorothee; Fufachev, Ivan A.; Gilg, Olivier; Terekhina, Alexandra; Volkovitskiy, Alexander; Shtro, Viktor (16 February 2021). "Dental evidence for variation in diet over time and space in the Arctic fox, Vulpes lagopus". Polar Biology. 44 (3): 509–523. doi:10.1007/s00300-021-02821-8. hdl:10037/24465. ISSN 0722-4060 – via Springer Nature Link.
- Peter S. Ungar, "The Trouble with Teeth: Our teeth are crowded, crooked and riddled with cavities. It hasn't always been this way", Scientific American, vol. 322, no. 4 (April 2020), pp. 44–49. "Our teeth [...] evolved over hundreds of millions of years to be incredibly strong and to align precisely for efficient chewing. [...] Our dental disorders largely stem from a shift in the oral environment caused by the introduction of softer, more sugary foods than the ones our ancestors typically ate."
- Ungar, P.S. (2018). "The real paleodiet". Scientific American. July (1): 42–49. Bibcode:2018SciAm.319a..42U. doi:10.1038/scientificamerican0718-42. PMID 29924104. S2CID 49312895.
- Ungar, Peter S.; Hlusko, L.J. (2016). "The evolutionary path of least resistance". Science. 353 (6294): 29–30. Bibcode:2016Sci...353...29U. doi:10.1126/science.aaf8398. PMID 27365438. S2CID 206649993.
- Xia, J.; Zheng, J.; Huang, D.; Tian, Z.R.; Chen, L.; Zhou, Z.; Ungar, P.S.; Qian, L. (2015). "A new model to explain tooth wear with implications for microwear formation and diet reconstruction". Proceedings of the National Academy of Sciences of the United States of America. 112 (34): 10669–10672. Bibcode:2015PNAS..11210669X. doi:10.1073/pnas.1509491112. PMC 4553824. PMID 26240350.
- Ungar, Peter S.; Krueger, Kristin L.; Blumenschine, Robert J.; Njau, Jackson; Scott, Robert S. (August 2012). "Dental microwear texture analysis of hominins recovered by the Olduvai Landscape Paleoanthropology Project, 1995–2007". Journal of Human Evolution. 63 (2): 429–437. doi:10.1016/j.jhevol.2011.04.006 – via Elsevier Science Direct.
- Henry, A.G.; Ungar, P.S.; Passey, B.H.; Sponheimer, M.; Rossouw, L.; Bamford, M.; Sandberg, P.; de Ruiter, D.J.; Berger, L.R. (2012). "The diet of Australopithecus sediba". Nature. 487 (7405): 90–93. Bibcode:2012Natur.487...90H. doi:10.1038/nature11185. PMID 22763449. S2CID 205229276.
- Ungar, P.S.; Sponheimer, M.J. (2011). "Early hominin diets". Science. 334 (6053): 190–193. Bibcode:2011Sci...334..190U. doi:10.1126/science.1207701. PMID 21998380. S2CID 206534879.
- Ungar, P.S.; Grine, F.E.; Teaford, M.F. (2008). "Dental microwear indicates that Paranthropus boisei was not a hard-object feeder". PLOS ONE. 3 (4) e2044. Bibcode:2008PLoSO...3.2044U. doi:10.1371/journal.pone.0002044. PMC 2315797. PMID 18446200.
- Ungar, Peter S. (2008). "Strong teeth, strong seeds". Nature. 452 (7188): 703–705. doi:10.1038/452703a. PMID 18401397. S2CID 7930952.
- Ungar, Peter S.; Grine, Frederick E.; Teaford, Mark F. (1 October 2006). "Diet in Early Homo: A Review of the Evidence and a New Model of Adaptive Versatility". Annual Review of Anthropology. 35 (1): 209–228. doi:10.1146/annurev.anthro.35.081705.123153. ISSN 0084-6570 – via Annual Reviews.
- Scott, R.S.; Ungar, P.S.; Bergstrom, T.S.; Brown, C.A.; Grine, F.E.; Teaford, M.F.; Walker, A. (2005). "Dental microwear texture analysis reflects diets of living primates and fossil hominins" (PDF). Nature. 436 (7051): 693–695. Bibcode:2005Natur.436..693S. doi:10.1038/nature03822. PMID 16079844. S2CID 4431062.
- Ungar, P.S. (2005). "Milking as much as possible out of dental topographic analysis". Proceedings of the National Academy of Sciences of the United States of America. 102 (46): 16533–16534. doi:10.1073/pnas.0508642102. PMC 1283857. PMID 16275898.
- Ungar, Peter S.; Kirera, F. (2003). "A solution to the worn tooth conundrum in primate functional anatomy". Proceedings of the National Academy of Sciences of the United States of America. 100 (7): 3874–3877. doi:10.1073/pnas.0637016100. PMC 153015. PMID 12634426.
- Teaford, M.F.; Ungar, P.S. (2000). "Diet and the evolution of the earliest human ancestors". Proceedings of the National Academy of Sciences of the United States of America. 97 (25): 13506–13511. Bibcode:2000PNAS...9713506T. doi:10.1073/pnas.260368897. PMC 17605. PMID 11095758.
- Ungar, P.S.; Kay, R.F. (1995). "The dietary adaptations of European Miocene catarrhines". Proceedings of the National Academy of Sciences of the United States of America. 92 (12): 5479–5481. Bibcode:1995PNAS...92.5479U. doi:10.1073/pnas.92.12.5479. PMC 41718. PMID 7777533.

=== Books ===
- Ungar, P.S. Evolution's Bite: A Story of Teeth, Diet, and Human Origins. 2017. ISBN 978-1-4008-8475-9
- Ungar, P.S. Teeth: A Very Short Introduction. 2014. ISBN 978-0-19-967059-8
- Ungar, P.S. Mammal Teeth: Origin, Evolution, and Diversity. 2010. ISBN 978-0-8018-9668-2
