= Mount Collard =

Mountain in Antarctica

Mount Collard (72°38′S 31°7′E) is a mountain rising to 2,350 metres (7,710 ft), standing 3.5 nautical miles (6 km) south of Mount Perov at the southern extremity of the Belgica Mountains. It was discovered by the Belgian Antarctic Expedition, 1957–58, under G. de Gerlache and named by him for Leo Collard, Belgian Minister of Public Instruction.
