= Mount Gaston de Gerlache =

Massif in Queen Fabiola Mountains, Antarctica

- Location within Antarctica

Highest point
- Elevation: 2,400 m (7,900 ft)
- Coordinates: 71°44′S 35°49′E

Geography
- Location: Queen Fabiola Mountains, Antarctica

Mount Gaston de Gerlache is the southernmost massif, 2,400 metres (7,900 ft) high, in the Queen Fabiola Mountains of Antarctica. It was discovered on 7 October 1960 by the Belgian Antarctic Expedition, 1960, under Guido Derom, and was named by Derom for Gaston de Gerlache, son of Adrien de Gerlache (leader of the first Belgian Antarctic Expedition, 1897–99). Gaston led the Belgian Antarctic Expedition, 1957–58, which landed on Princess Ragnhild Coast and built the Roi Baudouin Station to carry out the scientific program of the International Geophysical Year.
