= Mount Hulshagen =

Mountain in Queen Maud Land, Antarctica

Mount Hulshagen (72°31′S 31°16′E) is a mountain, 2,100 metres (6,900 ft) high, standing 1 nautical mile (2 km) northwest of Mount Bastin on the north side of the Belgica Mountains, Antarctica. It was discovered by the Belgian Antarctic Expedition, 1957–58, under G. de Gerlache, who named it for Charles Hulshagen, a vehicle mechanic with the expedition.
