= Mount Verhaegen =

Mountain in Queen Maud Land, Antarctica

Mount Verhaegen (72°34′S 31°8′E) is an ice-free mountain (2,300 m) standing immediately west of Mount Perov in the Belgica Mountains. It was discovered by the Belgian Antarctic Expedition, 1957–1958, under G. de Gerlache and named by him for Baron Pierre Verhaegen, collaborator of the expedition.
