= Mount Lahaye =

Mountain in Antarctica

Mount Lahaye (72°36′S 31°10′E) is a mountain, 2,475 metres (8,120 ft) high, on the north side of Giaever Glacier in the Belgica Mountains of Queen Maud Land, Antarctica. It was discovered by the Belgian Antarctic Expedition, 1957–58, under Gaston de Gerlache, and named after Professor Edmond Lahaye, President of the Belgian National Committee for the International Geophysical Year, 1957–58.
