= Christensen Glacier =

Christensen Glacier may refer to:

- Christensen Glacier (Bouvet Island)
- Christensen Glacier (South Georgia)

== See also ==
- Christiaensen Glacier
