= Mount Pierre =

Mountain in Queen Maud Land, Antarctica

Mount Pierre (71°18′S 35°45′E) is a massif (2,200 m) located north of Mount Goossens in the Queen Fabiola mountain range. It was discovered on October 7, 1960, by the Belgian Antarctic Expedition by Guido Derom, who named it after Michel Pierre. Pierre was an aircraft mechanic and a member of the Belgian flight search party in this area.
