= Sivorgfjella =

Mountain in Antarctica

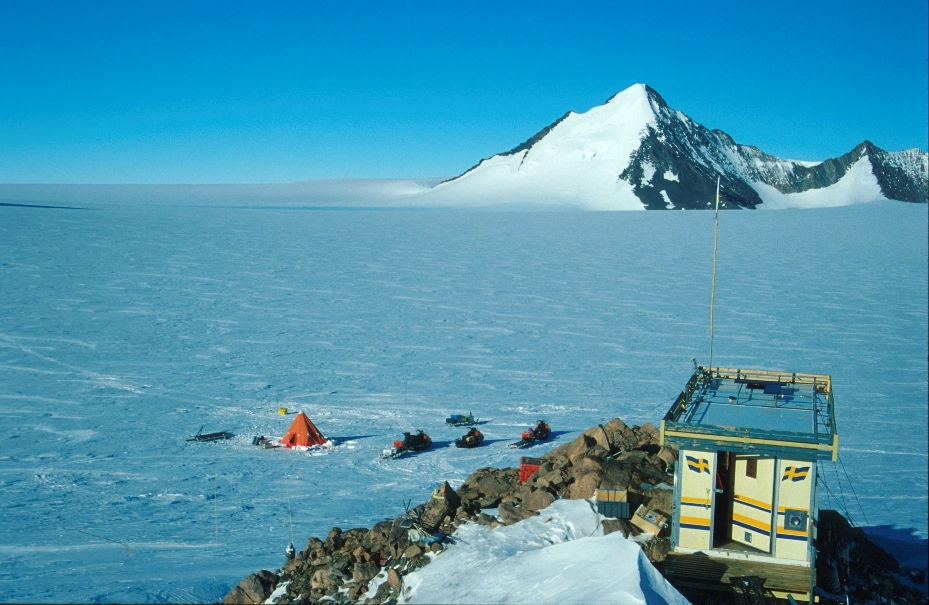
- The Swedish field station Svea in 2001

Dimensions
- Area: 1,800 km^{2} (690 sq mi)

Naming
- Etymology: Sivorg

Geography
- Location within Antarctica
- Continent: Antarctica
- Area: Queen Maud Land
- Range coordinates: 74°41′S 11°20′W
- Parent range: Heimefront Range

Sivorgfjella is the central and largest mountain in the Heimefront Range in Queen Maud Land. It is separated from the other parts of Heimefrontfjella by Kiberdalen to the south and KK-Dalen to the north. The mountain massif and nunataks cover an area of 1,800 km^{2} (690 sq mi) and the highest point is Paalnibba (2711 metres above sea level).

Sweden operate the only research station in Sivorgfjella. The research station Svea is staffed during the summer, and was established in the 1987/88 season at Scharffenbergbotnen.

The mountain is named after Sivorg, the home front's civil organisation during World War II.
