= Abu Hummus =

Abu Hummus hap-m-s
- Town
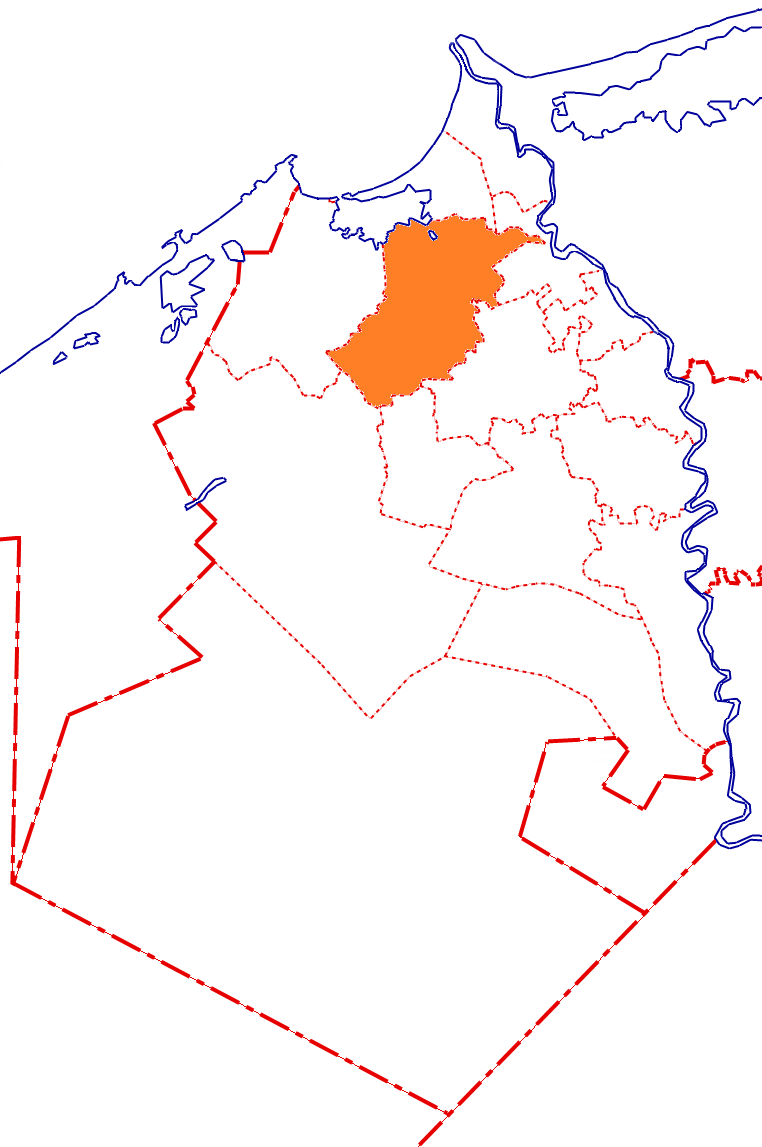
- Location in Beheira Governorate

- Location in Egypt Abu Hummus (Egypt)
- Coordinates: 31°06′02″N 30°18′46″E
- Country: Egypt
- Governorate: Beheira Governorate

Area
  - Total: 5.51 km^{2} (2.13 sq mi)

Population (2023)
  - Total: 63,580
  - Density: 11,500/km^{2} (29,900/sq mi)
- Time zone: UTC+2 (EET)
  - Summer (DST): UTC+3 (EEST)

Abu Hummus, also Abu Humus, Abu Hommos, Abu Homos, Abou Homs (Arabic: أبو حمص) is a town in Beheira Governorate, Egypt, an administrative center of markaz Abu Hummus.

The old name of the town is Shubra Bar (Arabic: شبرا بار) or Shunbar (Arabic: شُنْبَار) which Ramzi derives from Chabriou Kome (Ancient Greek: Χαβρίου Κώμη) named after Chabrias. Gauthier derives the modern name from Egyptian hap-m-s "which hides what is in it".

== Geography ==
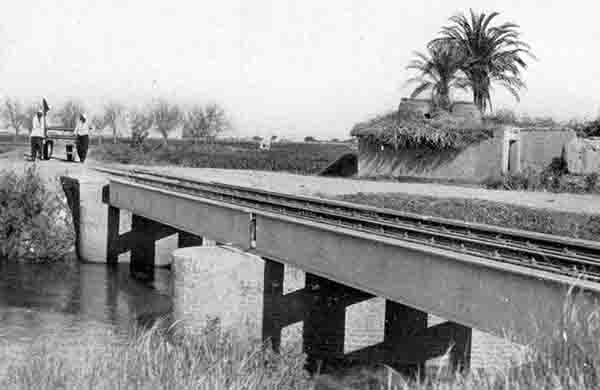
Railway line running through the Markas (district) in 1915.

Located midway between the city of Alexandria and the western branch of the Nile Delta, south of Lake Idku, Abu Hummus spans between the Cairo-Alexandria Agricultural Road and the El-Mahmoudeya Canal.

The town has a Local court, City Town Hall, and a railway station. In 1911 Nakhla meteorite landed in the town. Many people witnessed the meteorite approaching from the northwest, inclination about 30°, along with the track marked with a column of white smoke. Several explosions were heard before it fell to Earth in an area of 4.5 kilometres (2.8 mi) in diameter, and about forty pieces were recovered; the fragments were buried in the ground up to a metre deep.

== Markaz ==
As of 2007, the population of the markaz Abu Hummus was estimated at 348,000. The markaz is known as the site of the Nakhla meteorite.

== Notable people ==
- Yunis Makhyun
