= Mount Goossens =

Mountain in Antarctica

Mount Goossens (71°19′S 35°44′E) is a largely bare rock massif, 2,200 metres (7,200 ft) high, standing next south of Mount Pierre in the Queen Fabiola Mountains of Antarctica. It was discovered on October 7, 1960, by the Belgian Antarctic Expedition, under Guido Derom, who named it for Leon Goossens, photographer of the Belgian party which made reconnoitering aircraft flights in this area.
