= Mount Torii =

Mountain in Ross Dependency, Antarctica

Coordinates: 77°37′S 162°44′E

Mount Torii is a prominent bluff-type mountain above Lake Chad and Lake Hoare, surmounting the north wall of Taylor Valley between Suess Glacier and Canada Glacier, in Victoria Land. Named by Advisory Committee on Antarctic Names (US-ACAN) (1997) after Tetsuya Torii (Torii Glacier), geochemist, Japan Polar Research Association, who led Japanese research parties in geochemical studies of the lakes and ponds of McMurdo Dry Valleys in 20 summer field seasons, 1963 though 1986–87.
