= Nakhla meteorite =

Martian meteorite which landed in Egypt in 1911

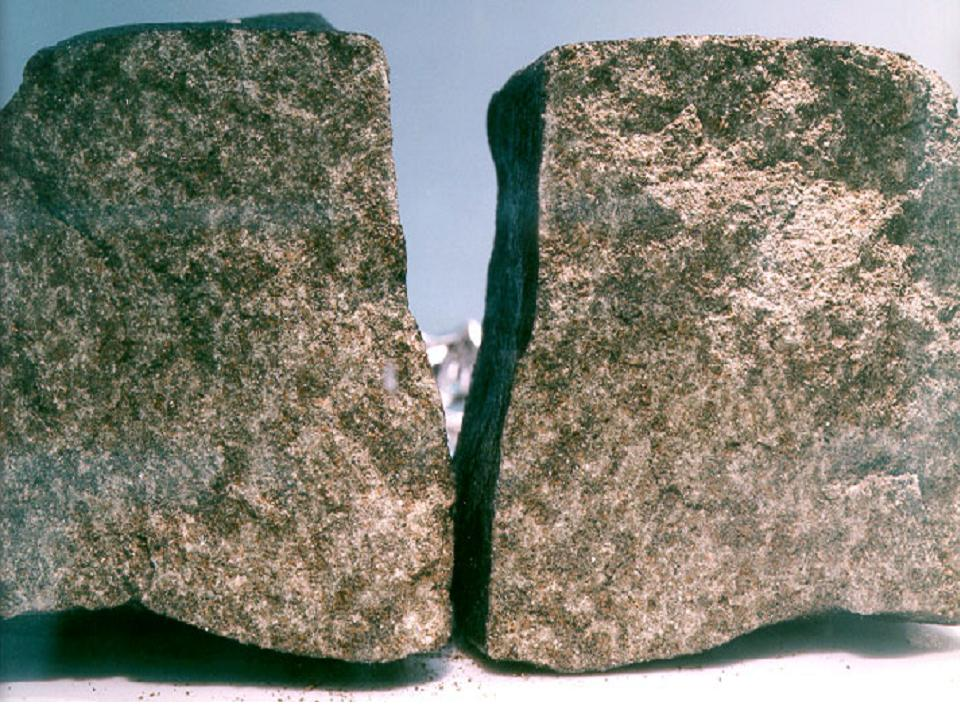
- Nakhla meteorite fragment (BM1913,25): two sides and its inner surfaces after being broken open
- Type: Achondrite
- Class: Martian meteorite
- Group: Nakhlite
- Country: Khedivate of Egypt
- Region: Abu Hummus, Beheira Governorate
- Coordinates: 31°9′N 30°21′E
- Observed fall: Yes
- Fall date: 1911-06-28
- TKW: 10 kilograms (22 lb)
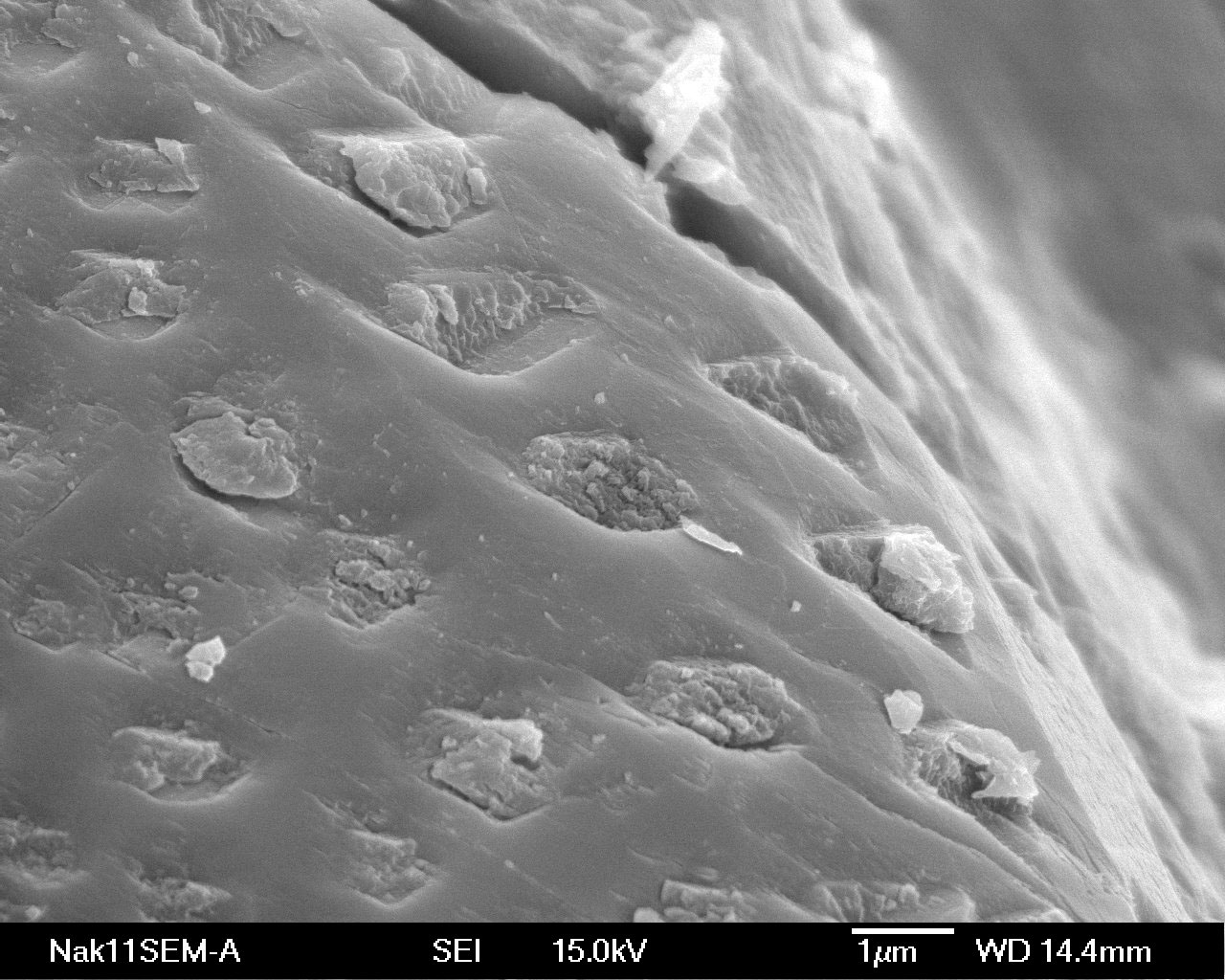
- Scanning electron microscope (SEM) image of the surface of a grain of the meteorite showing small pits filled with material. On Earth, similar pits are carved by bacteria
- Related media on Wikimedia Commons

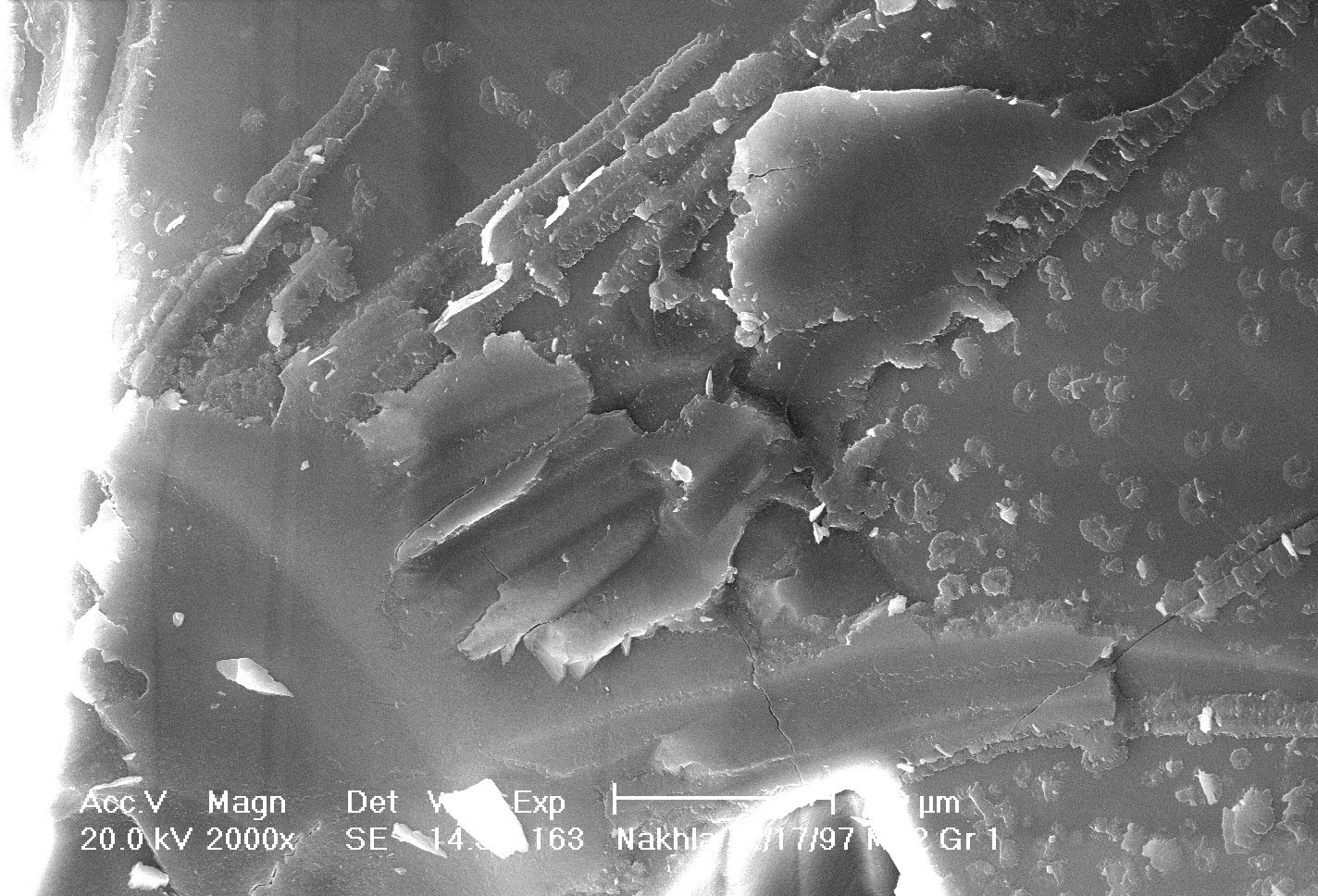
SEM image of a chip of the Naklha meteorite, depicting possible biomorph material: the larger, broad knife-like features and the small, donut-shaped features

Nakhla is a Martian meteorite which fell in Egypt in 1911. It was the first meteorite reported from Egypt, the first one to suggest signs of aqueous processes on Mars, and the prototype for Nakhlite type of meteorites.

== History ==
The Nakhla meteorite fell to Earth on June 28, 1911, at approximately 09:00, in the Abu Hommos district, Alexandria Governorate, Khedivate of Egypt (now Abu Hummus, Beheira Governorate), in the area of the village of El Nakhla El Bahariya. The stones were collected near hamlets of Ezbet Abdalla Zeid, Ezbet Abdel Malek, Ezbet el Askar, and Ezbet Saber Mahdi. Many people witnessed the meteorite approaching from the northwest, inclination about 30°, along with the track marked with a column of white smoke. Several explosions were heard before it fell to Earth in an area of 4.5 kilometres (2.8 mi) in diameter, and about forty pieces were recovered; the fragments were buried in the ground up to a metre deep. From an estimated original weight of 10 kilograms (22 lb), recovered fragments ranged in weight from 20 grams (0.71 oz) to 1813 grams (64.0 oz).

Two fragments, found near Ezbet Abdel Malek, were presented by the Egyptian Government to the British Museum.

=== Nakhla dog ===
One fragment of the meteorite was said to have landed on a dog, as observed by a farmer named Mohammed Ali Effendi Hakim in the village of Denshal supposedly vaporizing the animal instantly. Since no remains of the dog were recovered and there was no other eyewitness to the dog's demise, this story remains apocryphal. However, the story of the Nakhla dog has become something of a legend among astronomers.

== Classification ==
It is the prototypical example of the Nakhlite type meteorite of the SNC Group of Mars meteorites. The meteorite was formed about 1.3 billion years ago at a volcano on Mars.

A number of meteorites thought to have originated from Mars have been catalogued from around the world, including the Nakhlites. These are considered to have been ejected by the impact of another large body colliding with the Martian surface. They then travelled through the Solar System for an unknown period before penetrating the Earth's atmosphere.

=== Signs of water ===
Nakhla is the first Martian meteorite to show signs of aqueous processes on Mars. The rock contains carbonates and hydrous minerals, formed by chemical reactions in water. Also, the rock was exposed to water after it formed, which caused secondary accumulations of minerals. The carbonates contain more carbon-13 than rocks formed on Earth, indicating Martian origin.

=== Signs of life ===
In March 1999, after receiving part of the meteorite from the British Museum in 1998, a team from NASA's Johnson Space Center examined the Nakhla meteorite using an optical microscope and a powerful scanning electron microscope (SEM), revealing possibly biomorphic forms of a limited size range, among other features. London's Natural History Museum, which holds several intact fragments of the meteorite, allowed NASA researchers to break one open in 2006, providing fresh samples, relatively free from Earth-sourced contamination. These scientists found an abundance of complex carbonaceous material occupying dendritic pores and channels in the rock, resembling the effects of bacteria observed in rocks on Earth.

A debate took place at the 37th Lunar and Planetary Science Conference in March 2006 in Houston, Texas over the postulate that carbon-rich content within the pores of the rocks consisted of the remains of living matter. Because carbon is the fourth most abundant element in the universe (after hydrogen, helium, and oxygen), the presence of shapes resembling living organisms was considered insufficient by most attendees to prove that bacteria once lived on Mars. A team concluded in 2014 that although the non-biological scenario is considered to be the most reasonable explanation for the shapes in this meteorite, it is evident that the Martian subsurface contains niche environments where life could develop.

==== Amino acids within the meteorite ====
In 1999, various amino acids were isolated from the meteorite fragment at Johnson Space Center. Among them were aspartic acid, glutamic acid, glycine, alanine, and γ-aminobutyric acid. However, it is not clear whether they were initially from the meteorite or the product of terrestrial contamination.

== See also ==
- Allan Hills 84001, Martian meteorite
- Astrobiology
- Biosignature
- Glossary of meteoritics
- Life on Mars
- List of meteorites on Mars
- Northwest Africa 7034
- Panspermia
- Shergotty meteorite
- Yamato 000593, Martian meteorite
