= Mount Rossel =

Mountain in Antarctica

Mount Rossel (72°36′S 31°2′E) is a mountain, 2,250 m, standing 3 nautical miles (6 km) southwest of Mount Perov in the Belgica Mountains. Discovered by the Belgian Antarctic Expedition, 1957-58, under G. de Gerlache, who named it for Mlle. Marie-Thérèse Rossel, a patron of the expedition.
