= Yamato Glacier =

Glacier in Antarctica

- Location of Queen Maud Land in Antarctica

- Location within Antarctica
- Location: Queen Maud Land
- Coordinates: 71°25′S 35°35′E
- Length: 6 nmi (11 km; 7 mi)
- Thickness: unknown
- Terminus: Queen Fabiola Mountains
- Status: unknown

The Yamato Glacier (71°25′S 35°35′E) is a glacier about 6 miles (10 km) wide, flowing west between Mount Fukushima and Mount Eyskens in the Queen Fabiola Mountains of Antarctica.

== History ==
Discovered by the Belgian Antarctic Expedition under Guido Derom, October 7, 1960, and named after an old name of the cove of Honshū. Yamato is the symbol of the political unity and the national consciousness of the Japanese people. In November–December 1960, a Japanese field party reached this area and carried out geodetic and other scientific work.

== See also ==
- List of glaciers in the Antarctic
- Glaciology
