= Svea Research Station =

Svea Station
- Antarctic base
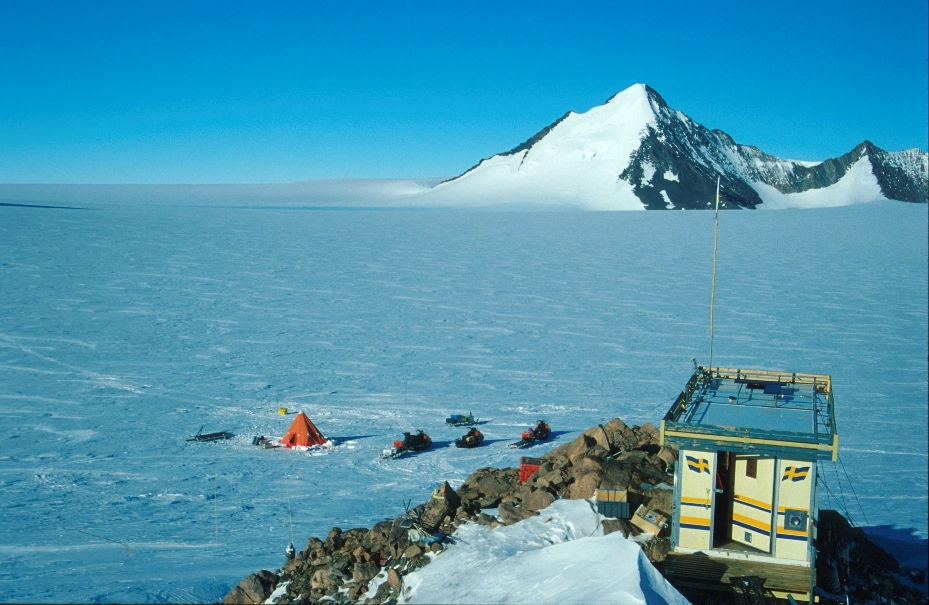
- Svea field station in 2001

- Location of Svea Station in Antarctica
- Coordinates: 74°35′00″S 11°13′00″W
- Country: Sweden
- Location in Antarctica: Heimefront Range; Queen Maud Land
- Administered by: Swedish Polar Research Secretariat
- Established: 1987

Population
  - Summer: 5
  - Winter: 0
- Type: Seasonal
- Period: Summer
- Status: Operational
- Activities: List: Geodesy; Seismology
- Facilities: Two fiberglass modules
- Website: Swedish Polar Research Secretariat

The Svea Research Station is a Swedish research facility in Antarctica, established in 1987/1988.

Svea is located in the Scharffenbergbotnen valley in the Heimefrontfjella mountain range, about 400 km from the coast. It is a satellite station to the Wasa Research Station, and is used by small, transient research teams performing fieldwork in the area.

The station is currently the home base for two permanent monitoring projects: continual geodetic measurement using GPS technology, run by the Royal Institute of Technology in Stockholm, and a seismograph that records movements in the Earth's crust, run by the German Alfred Wegener Institute.

== See also ==
- List of Antarctic research stations
- List of Antarctic field camps
- Swedish Polar Research Secretariat
- Wasa Research Station
- Crime in Antarctica
