= Nakhlite =

Group of Martian meteorites

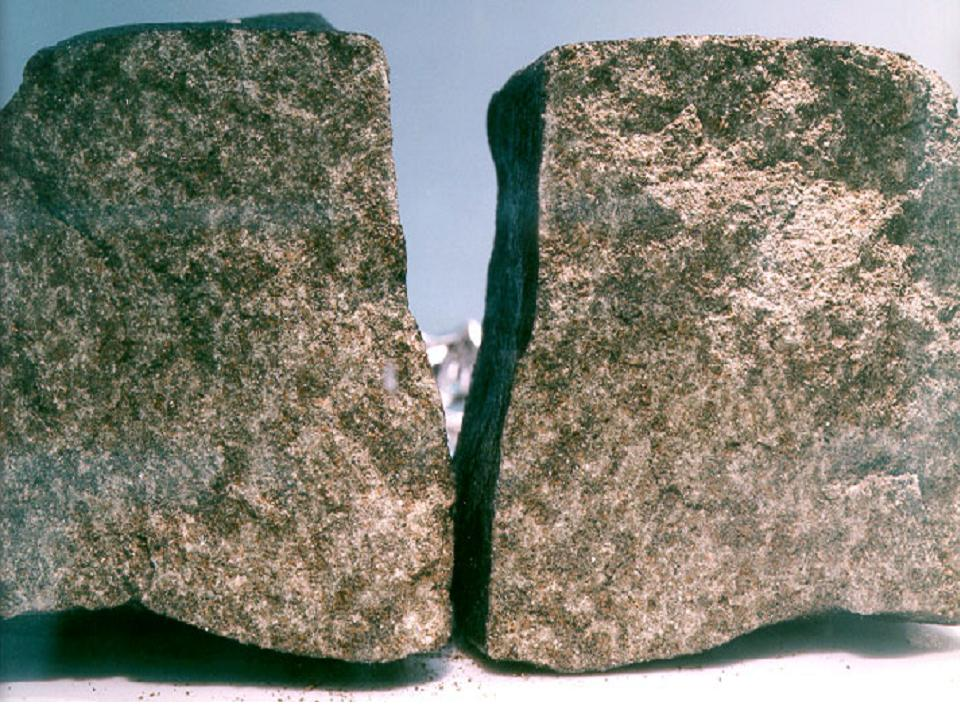
Nakhla meteorite's two halves, showing its inner surfaces after being broken in 1998

Nakhlites are a group of Martian meteorites, named after the first one, Nakhla meteorite.

Nakhlites are igneous rocks that are rich in augite and were formed from basaltic magma about 1.3 billion years ago. They contain augite and olivine crystals. Their crystallization ages, compared to a crater count chronology of different regions on Mars, suggest the nakhlites formed on the large volcanic construct of either Tharsis, Elysium, or Syrtis Major Planum.

== History ==
A 2017 study dated them to at least four different eruptions from 1416 ± 7 Ma to 1322 ± 10 Ma. It has been shown that the nakhlites were suffused with liquid water around 620 million years ago and that they were ejected from Mars around 10.75 million years ago by an asteroid impact. They fell to Earth within the last 10,000 years.

== Possible source crater in Elysium ==
A 6.5 km diameter crater at 29.674°N 130.799°E in the volcanic plains to the northwest of Elysium Mons has been identified as a possible source. Based on the crater dimensions, the inferred growth rate of the source volcano during that interval is 0.4–0.7 m per Ma, far slower than would be expected for a terrestrial volcano, and implying that Martian volcanism had slowed greatly by that point in history.

== Samples ==
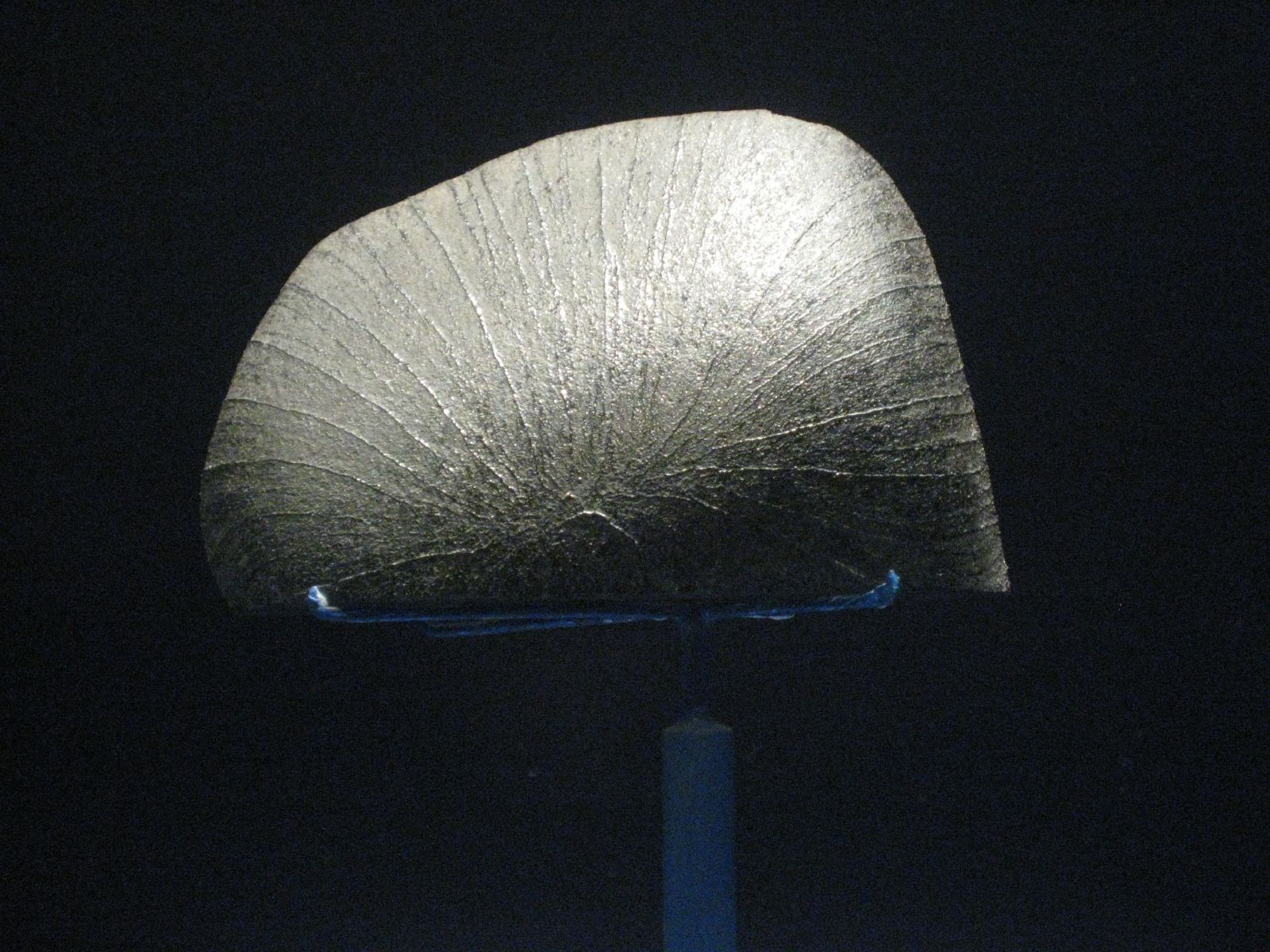
Lafayette

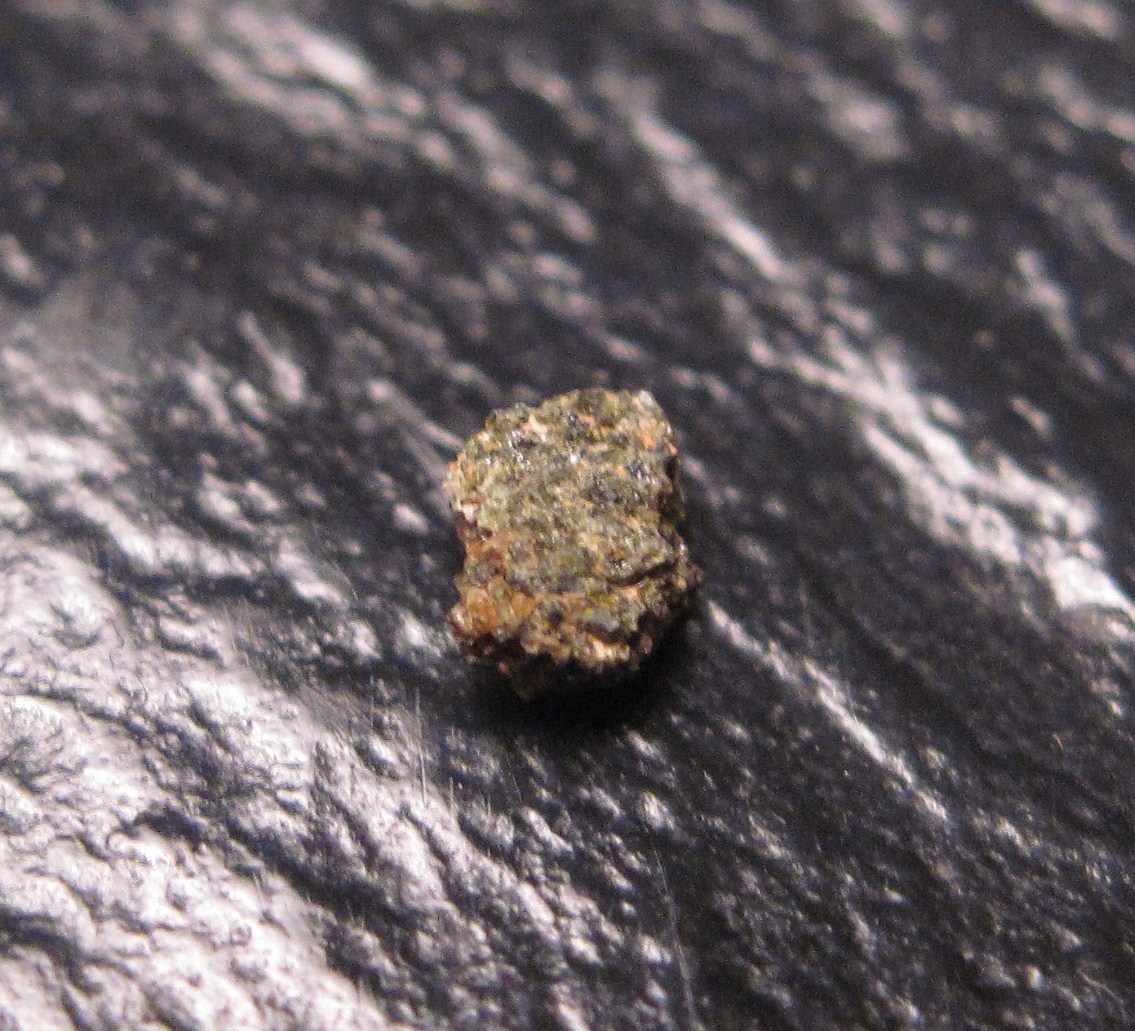
NWA 998

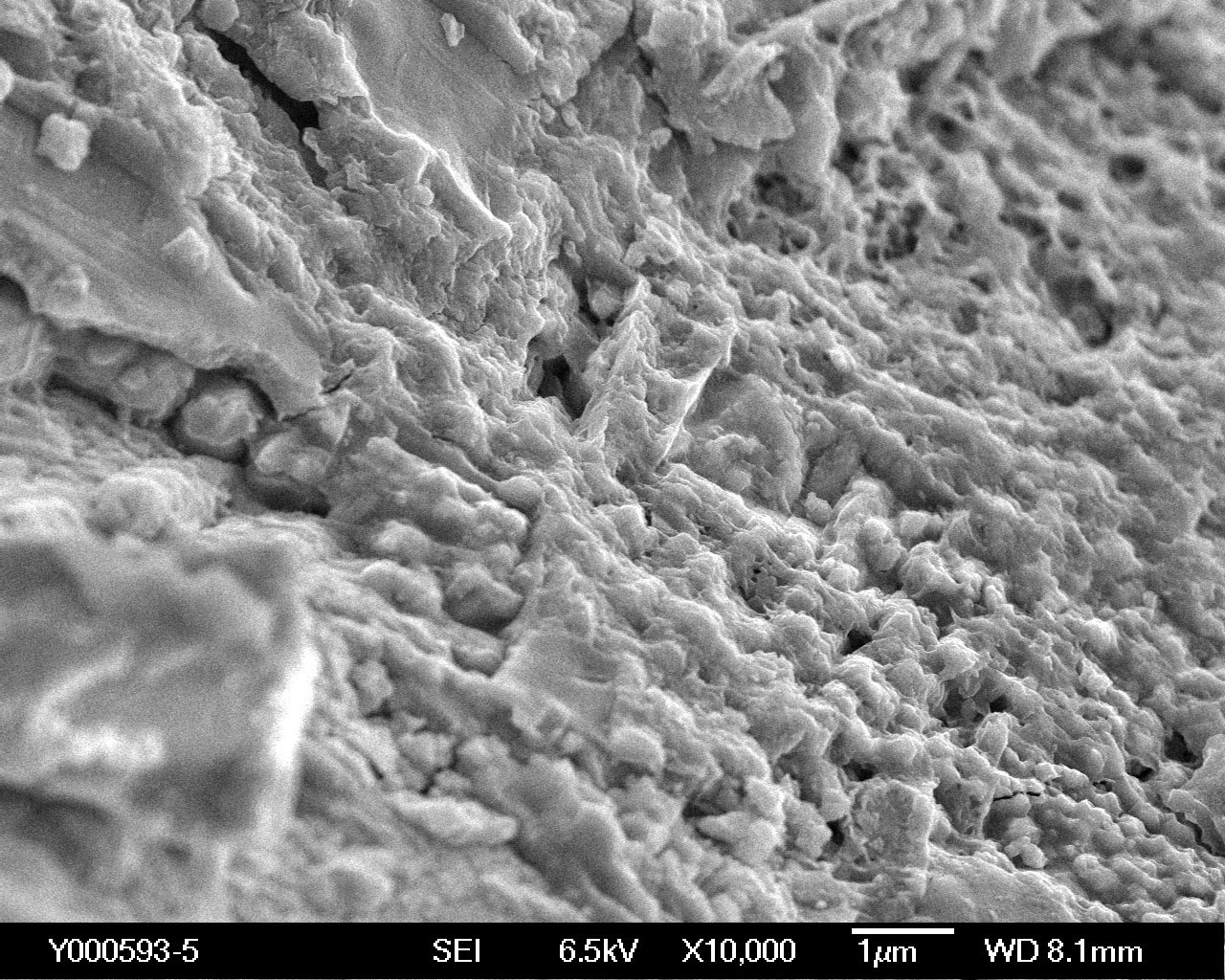
Y000593

The following samples of nakhlites are known.

- Nakhla meteorite (about 40 samples, total estimated weight 10 kilograms (22 lb)), vicinity of Nakhla, Abu Hommos district, Alexandria Governorate, Egypt, 1911
- Governador Valadares meteorite
- Lafayette meteorite, 800g, before 1931
- NWA817, 104g, Morocco, 2000
- NWA998, 456g, Morocco, 2001
- Y000593 (Yamato 593), 13.7 kilograms (30 lb)
- Y000749, 1.28 kilograms (2.8 lb)
- Y000802, 22g
- MIL 03346 Miller Range, Antarctica
- MIL 090030, MIL 090032, and MIL 090136, Miller Range, Antarctica

== See also ==
- Glossary of meteoritics
- Clinopyroxenite - the geological rock classification of Nakhlites
