= Swedish Polar Research Secretariat =

Swedish government agency for polar research, north and south

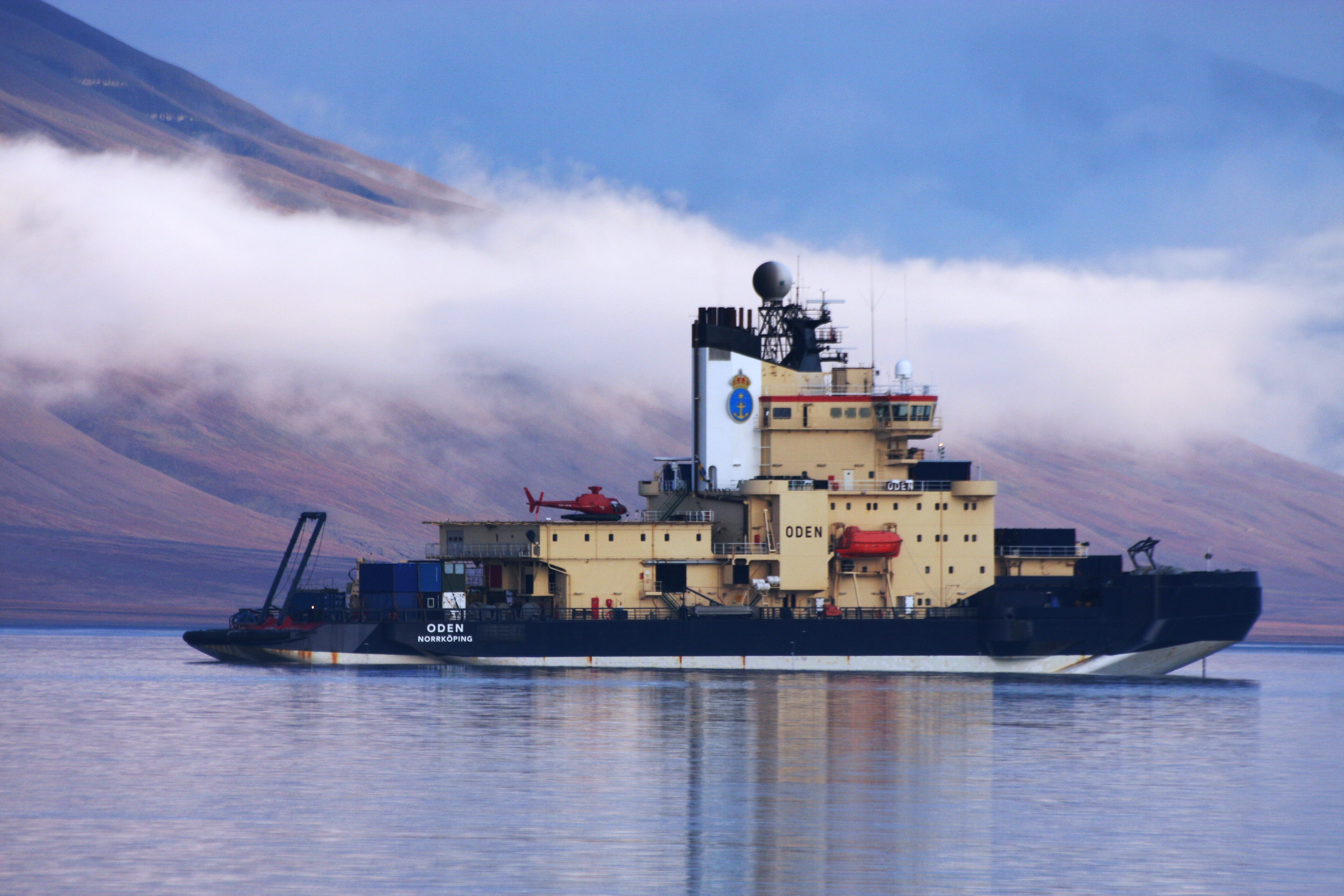
- Oden on an expedition to Svalbard in 2011
- Formation: 1984
- Legal status: Government Organisation
- Purpose: Support and coordinate Swedish polar research
- Location: Stockholm, Sweden
- Region served: Sweden
- Director-General: Katarina Gårdfeldt
- Budget: 38 765 000 SEK (2015)
- Staff: 30+ staff
- Website: Swedish Polar Research Secretariat

The Swedish Polar Research Secretariat (Swedish: Polarforskningssekretariatet) is a government agency in charge of coordinating and promoting Swedish polar research activities. It is located in Stockholm, has more than 30 employees, and serves under the Ministry of Education and Research.

== Research platforms and activities ==
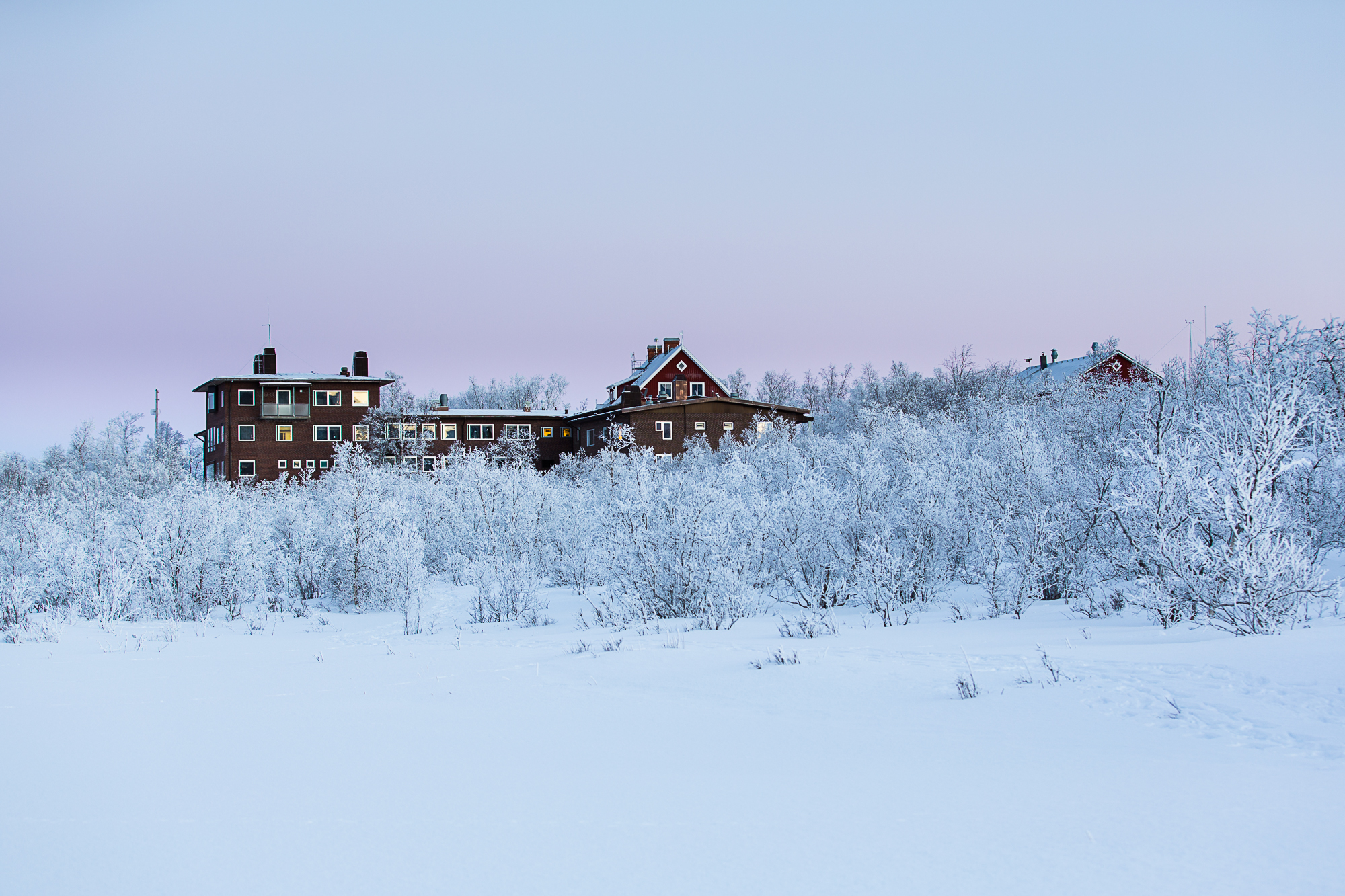
Abisko Scientific Research Station.

The Swedish Polar Research Secretariat does not conduct research itself, but provides support to researchers - typically at universities - by organizing expeditions to polar regions, operating research stations, and providing an overall research infrastructure (logistics etc.). It also promotes polar research that does not require field work, and takes an active role in the dissemination of research results. As part of this effort, teachers and artists are routinely part of Swedish research expeditions.

In 1987-1988, the Secretariat set up its first research station in Antarctica, Svea. The next year, the Wasa Research Station was opened. As of 2010, the Secretariat is also in charge of the Abisko Scientific Research Station in sub-arctic Sweden. In (northern) summer, it charters the icebreaker Oden from the Swedish Maritime Administration for research expeditions to the Arctic Ocean.

The Swedish Polar Research Secretariat represents Sweden (or supports the government) in international negotiations and cooperations pertaining to polar issues. It actively pursues environmental protection of the polar regions. It also issues permits to Swedish citizens to conduct research in Antarctica, under the Swedish Antarctic Act (2006:924).

== History ==
As Swedish polar research advanced in the early 1980s, there was a growing need for more funding, coordination and logistic support. The Swedish Polar Research Secretariat started in 1984 with a budget of 4 million SEK. That same year, Sweden became an associated member of the Antarctic Treaty System, followed by full membership in 1988. In order to achieve full membership, Sweden had to operate a research station in Antarctica, and the 12 m^{2} Svea station was rapidly set up in 1987-1988. The next year, the bigger Swea station opened. A few years later, the Oden became yet another research platform, and in 1991, Oden and the German Polarstern became the first conventional vessels to reach the North Pole.

== Directors-General ==
- Anders Karlqvist (1984–1993, 1995–2009)
- Olle Melander (1993–1995)
- Björn Dahlbäck (2010-2017)
- Katarina Gårdfeldt (2018-)
