= Mount Derom =

Mountain in Antarctica

Mount Derom (71°34′S 35°38′E) is a massif 2,400 metres (7,900 ft) high standing 2 miles (3 km) south of Mount Eyskens in the Queen Fabiola Mountains. It was discovered on October 7, 1960, by the Belgian Antarctic Expedition under the leadership of Guido Derom, and was named for Derom by the Centre National de Recherches Polaires de Belgique.
