= Cape Gerlache =

Cape on Davis Peninsula, Antarctica

Cape Gerlache (66°30′S 99°2′E) is a cape which forms the northeast tip of Davis Peninsula, Antarctica, 4 nautical miles (7 km) southeast of David Island. It was discovered in November 1912 by the Australasian Antarctic Expedition, 1911–1914, under Mawson, who named it for Lieutenant Adrien de Gerlache, leader of the Belgian Antarctic Expedition, 1897–1899.
