= De Gerlache Seamounts =

Seamounts in Antarctica, named for Lieutenant Adrien Victor Joseph de Gerlache

De Gerlache Seamounts (65°0′S 90°30′W) are seamounts in Antarctica, named for Lieutenant Adrien Victor Joseph de Gerlache (Royal Belgian Navy), Commander of the Belgica during the first Belgian Antarctic Expedition, 1896–1899.
