= Mount Fukushima =

Peak in Antarctica

Coordinates: 71°21′S 35°37′E

Mount Fukushima is, at 2,470 metres (8,100 ft), the highest massif in the Queen Fabiola Mountains of Antarctica, standing just north of Yamato Glacier. The rock massif rises 1,600 metres (5,200 ft) above the local ice surface and has many ragged peaks. It was discovered in 1960 by the Belgian Antarctic Expedition, under Guido Derom, and was named by Derom after Shin Fukushima, a geophysicist of the Japanese expedition, lost in a violent blizzard near the Japanese station on East Ongul Island in October 1960.

== See also ==
- List of mountains of Queen Maud Land
