= Nevlingen Peak =

Mountain in Antarctica

- Location within Antarctica

Highest point
- Elevation: 2,100 metres (6,900 ft)
- Coordinates: 67°59′S 55°05′E

Geography
- Location: Enderby Land

Nevlingen Peak is a 2,100 m tall isolated peak located 13 mi SE of Doggers Nunataks in Enderby Land. It was mapped by Norwegian cartographers from air photos taken by the Lars Christensen Expedition of 1936–37 and was named Nevlingen.

== See also ==
- List of mountains of Queen Maud Land
