= Ronald Oremland =

American microbiologist (1946–2021)

Ronald S. Oremland
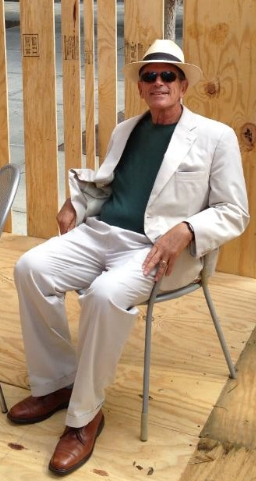
- Born: October 23, 1946
- Died: September 16, 2021 (aged 74)
- Citizenship: US
- Education: Rensselaer Polytechnic Institute, University of Miami
- Scientific career
- Workplaces: United States Geological Survey

Ronald Oremland was an American microbiologist, astrobiologist, and emeritus senior scientist at the United States Geological Survey. He authored over 200 papers on the microbiology of extreme habitats.

== Biography ==
Oremland was raised in Brooklyn, New York. He received his B.S. in biology from Rensselaer Polytechnic Institute in 1968, where he was inspired by Hermann Ehrlich's geomicrobiology course to pursue a career in marine microbiology. He served as an active duty officer on the USS Utina (ATF-163) in the U.S. Navy. In 1976, he received a PhD from the University of Miami under the mentorship of Barrie F. Taylor, where he worked on methane cycling in tropical marine sediments. He went on to a postdoc at the NASA Ames Research Center, where he worked with Melvin P. Silverman on sulfate-reducing bacteria. He died of acute leukemia on September 16, 2021, at the age of 74.

== Research ==
From 1977 to 2019, Oremland conducted research at the United States Geological Survey in Menlo Park on the microbial metabolism in extreme environments including Mono Lake. His research focused on the geomicrobiology of acetylene, selenium, and arsenic.

== Honors ==
Oremland was an elected fellow of the American Society for Microbiology, American Geophysical Union, International Society for Environmental Biogeochemistry, and the American Association for the Advancement of Science. He was the 2020 recipient of the American Society of Microbiology Award for Environmental Research.
