= Mount Eyskens =

Large rock and ice massif in Antarctica

Mount Eyskens (71°32′S 35°36′E) is a large rock and ice massif rising to 2,300 metres (7,500 ft) next northward of Mount Derom in the Queen Fabiola Mountains of Antarctica. It was discovered by the Belgian Antarctic Expedition under Guido Derom, October 7, 1960, and named for Albert Eyskens, the pilot of one of the two aircraft used by the Belgian reconnoitering party in this area.
