= Norsk Polarinstitutt Glacier =

Glacier in Antarctica

- Location of Queen Maud Land in Antarctica

- Location within Antarctica
- Location: Queen Maud Land
- Coordinates: 72°34′S 31°16′E
- Thickness: unknown
- Terminus: Belgica Mountains
- Status: unknown

Norsk Polarinstitutt Glacier (72°34′S 31°16′E) is a glacier flowing southwest between Mount Perov and Mount Limburg Stirum in the Belgica Mountains. Discovered by the Belgian Antarctic Expedition, 1957–58, under G. de Gerlache, who named it after the Norsk Polarinstitutt, which at the time was situated in Oslo but today has its headquarters in Tromsø (since 1998).

== See also ==
- List of glaciers in the Antarctic
- Glaciology
