= Heimefront Range =

Mountain range in Antarctica

Coordinates: 74°35′S 11°0′W

The Heimefront Range is a range of mountains in three groups trending northeast–southwest for 65 nautical miles (120 km), situated 50 nautical miles (93 km) west-southwest of the Kirwan Escarpment in Queen Maud Land, Antarctica. The range was observed and photographed by the Norwegian–British–Swedish Antarctic Expedition in the course of air reconnaissance from Maudheim Station in January 1952. The name "Heimefrontfjella" (homefront range) was applied by the placename authority in the Norwegian government. This range may include the crudely mapped mountains identified as "Kottas Berge" on the map of the Third German Antarctic Expedition of 1938–39.

Wide glaciers divide the Heimefront Range in four ice free areas. These are, from north east to south west: Milorgfjella (Kottas Berge, Milorg Mountains), XU-fjella (XU Mountains), Sivorgfjella and Tottan Hills.
