= Polar Biology =

- Discipline: Biology of the polar regions
- Language: English
- Edited by: Dieter Piepenburg

Publication details
- History: 1983–present
- Publisher: Springer Science+Business Media
- Frequency: Monthly
- Impact factor: 1.711 (2015)

Standard abbreviations
- ISO 4: Polar Biol.

Indexing
- ISSN: 0722-4060 (print); 1432-2056 (web)

Links
- Journal homepage; Online archive

Polar Biology is a monthly peer-reviewed scientific journal covering the biology of the polar regions. It is published by Springer Science+Business Media. According to the Journal Citation Reports, the journal has a 2015 impact factor of 1.711.
