= Adrien de Gerlache =

Belgian naval officer and explorer (1866-1934)

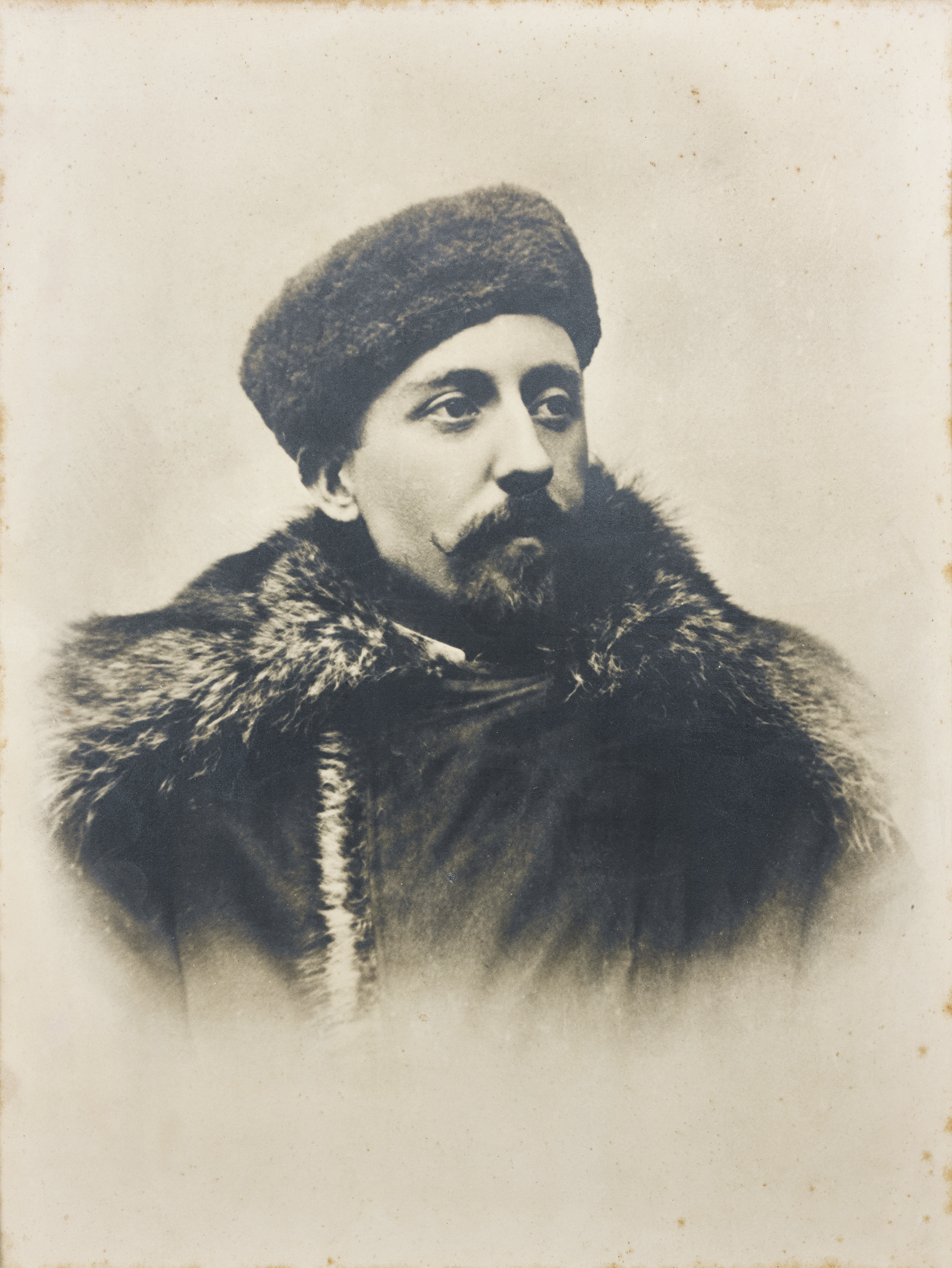
- Born: Adrien Victor Joseph de Gerlache de Gomery; 2 August 1866; Hasselt, Belgium
- Died: 4 December 1934 (aged 68); Brussels, Belgium
- Education: Free University of Brussels
- Occupation: Naval officer
- Known for: Commander of the Belgian Antarctic Expedition
- Spouse(s): Suzanne Poulet (1904-1913); Elisabeth Höjer (1918-1934)
- Children: Philippe; Marie-Louise; Gaston

Baron Adrien Victor Joseph de Gerlache de Gomery FRSGS (French pronunciation: [adʁijɛ̃ viktɔʁ ʒozɛf də ʒɛʁlaʃ də ɡɔmʁi]; 2 August 1866 – 4 December 1934) was a Belgian officer in the Belgian Royal Navy who led the Belgian Antarctic Expedition of 1897–99.

== Early years ==
Born in Hasselt in eastern Belgium as the son of an army officer, de Gerlache was educated in Brussels. From a young age, he was deeply attracted by the sea, and made three voyages in 1883 and 1884 to the United States as a cabin boy on an ocean liner. He studied engineering at the Free University of Brussels. After finishing his third year in 1885, he quit the university and joined the Belgian Navy on 19 January 1886.

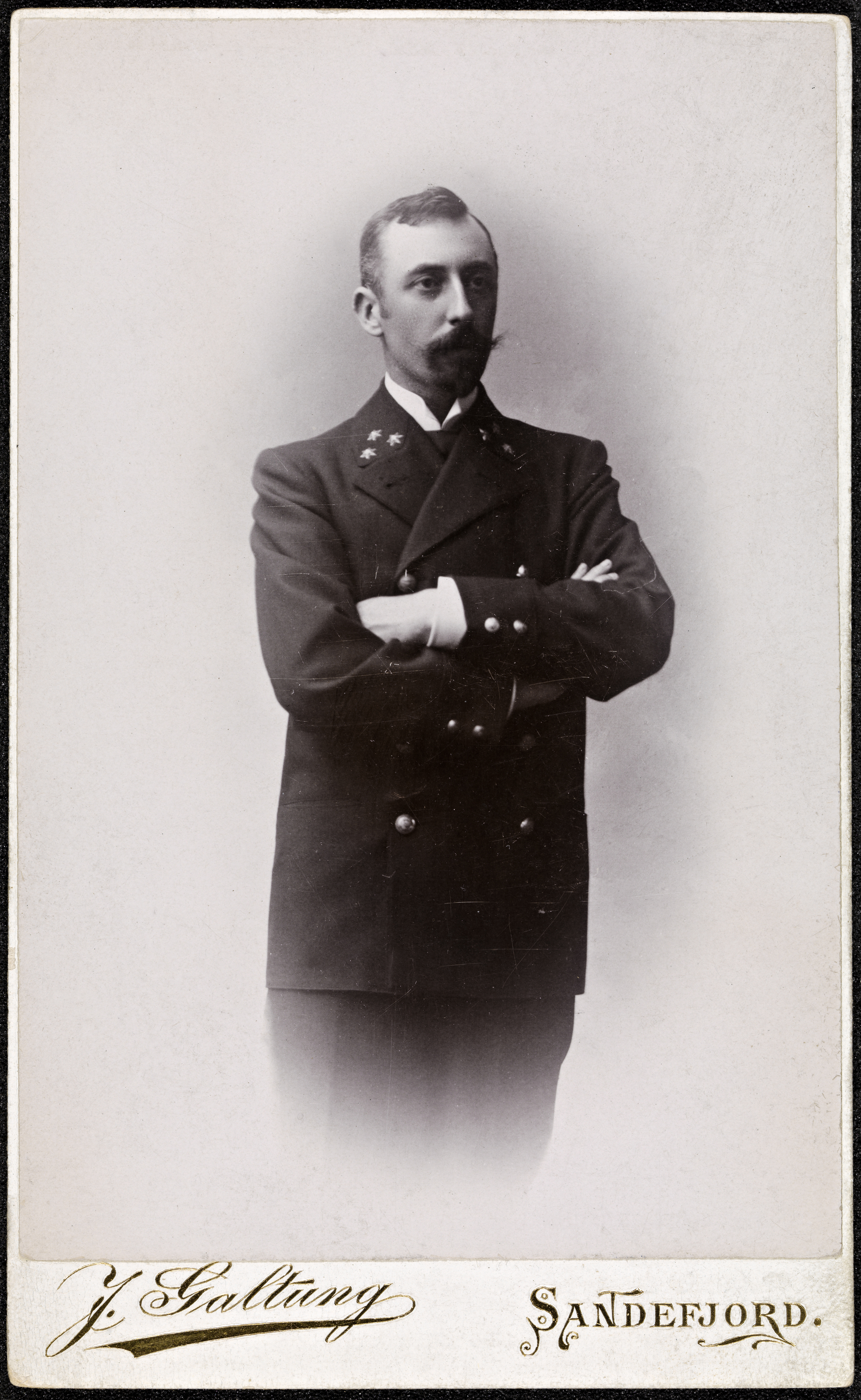
Adrien de Gerlache in 1897

After graduating from the nautical college of Ostend he worked on fishery protection vessels as second and third lieutenant. In October 1887 he signed on as a seaman on the Craigie Burn, an English ship, for a voyage to San Francisco, but the ship failed to round Cape Horn and was sold for scrap in Montevideo. He returned to Europe after spending time in Uruguay and Argentina. After a trip to Constantinople and the Black Sea, he worked for the Holland-America Line as fourth officer, before obtaining an appointment as lieutenant in the Belgian Navy. Until July 1894 he was an officer on Ostend-Dover ferries, meanwhile taking courses and becoming a captain on 22 August 1894.

Frustrated by the monotonous work aboard the Ostend-Dover ferries, de Gerlache offered his services to Belgian King Leopold II and Welsh-American adventurer Henry Morton Stanley, for an expedition to the Congo, but the offer was turned down. A letter to polar explorer Otto Nordenskiöld went unanswered. Finally he started planning and promoting his own Antarctic expedition, proposing his plan in 1894 to the Belgian Royal Geographical Society.

== First expedition ==
In 1896, de Gerlache purchased the Norwegian-built whaling ship Patria, which he extensively refitted and renamed Belgica. With a multinational crew including Roald Amundsen, Frederick Cook, Antoni Bolesław Dobrowolski, Henryk Arctowski and Emil Racoviță, he set sail from Antwerp on 16 August 1897.

The Belgica reached the coast of Graham Land on the Antarctic Peninsula in January 1898. Sailing between the Graham Land coast and a string of islands to the west, de Gerlache named the passage Belgica Strait. This strait was later renamed Gerlache Strait in his honour. After charting and naming several islands during some 20 separate landings, they crossed the Antarctic Circle on 15 February 1898.

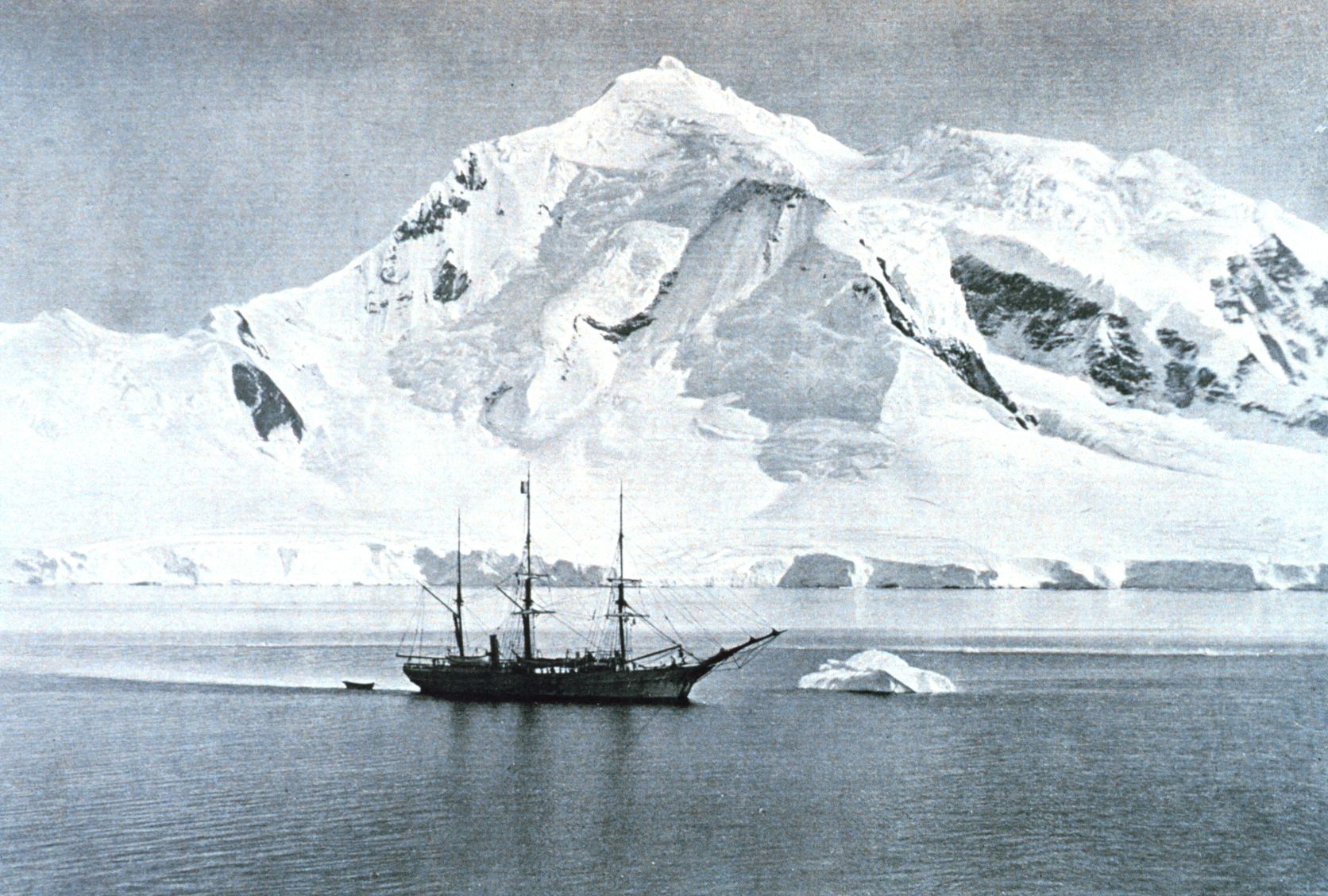
The Belgica anchored near Mount William, on Anvers Island

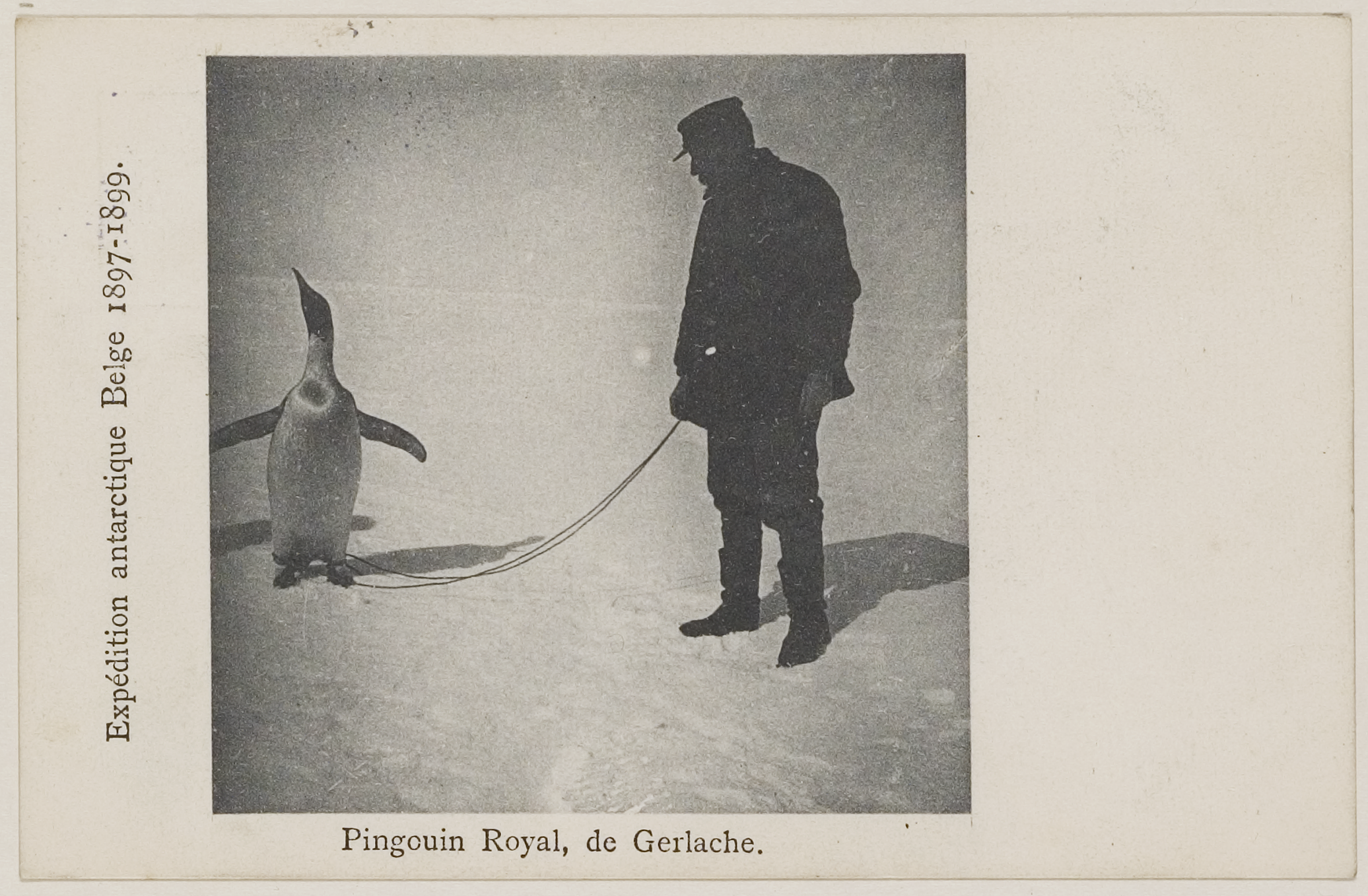
de Gerlache with a penguin

On 28 February 1898, de Gerlache's expedition became trapped in the ice of the Bellinghausen Sea, near Peter I Island. Despite their efforts, they quickly realised that they would be forced to spend the winter in Antarctica. Total darkness set in on 17 May, lasting until 23 July. Another seven months of hardship followed as the crew laboured to free the vessel from the ice. Several men lost their sanity, including one Belgian sailor who left the ship "announcing he was going back to Belgium". The party also suffered from scurvy.

On 15 February 1899, the vessel was able to begin moving through the channel that the crew had cleared. It took them nearly a month to cover 7 miles, and on 14 March they cleared the ice. The expedition returned to Antwerp on 5 November 1899. In 1902, de Gerlache's book Quinze Mois dans l'Antarctique ('Fifteen Months in Antarctica'), published in 1901, was awarded a prize by the Académie française.

The fungi collected during the expedition were described in a paper published in 1905 by Marietta Hanson Rousseau and Elisa Caroline Bommer.

== Later years ==
De Gerlache participated in several other expeditions, including:

- a commercial and scientific expedition to the Persian Gulf in 1901
- the first Antarctic expedition (1903–1905) of Jean-Baptiste Charcot. De Gerlache began on this voyage but returned to Belgium when the ship reached Madeira
- expedition to the Greenland Sea on board the Belgica (1905)
- expedition to the Barents Sea and Kara Sea (1907)
- expedition to Greenland, Spitsbergen and the Franz Jozef archipelago on board the Belgica (1909)

He had two children with his first wife, Suzanne Poulet, whom he married in 1904: Philippe (born 1906) and Marie-Louise (born 1908). After this marriage ended in 1913, de Gerlache married Elisabeth Höjer from Sweden. With her, he had another son, the explorer Gaston de Gerlache in 1919. In the 1950s, Gaston followed in his father's footsteps, participating in a Belgian research station in Antarctica.

Adrien de Gerlache died in Brussels in 1934, aged 68, from paratyphoid fever.

== Tributes ==
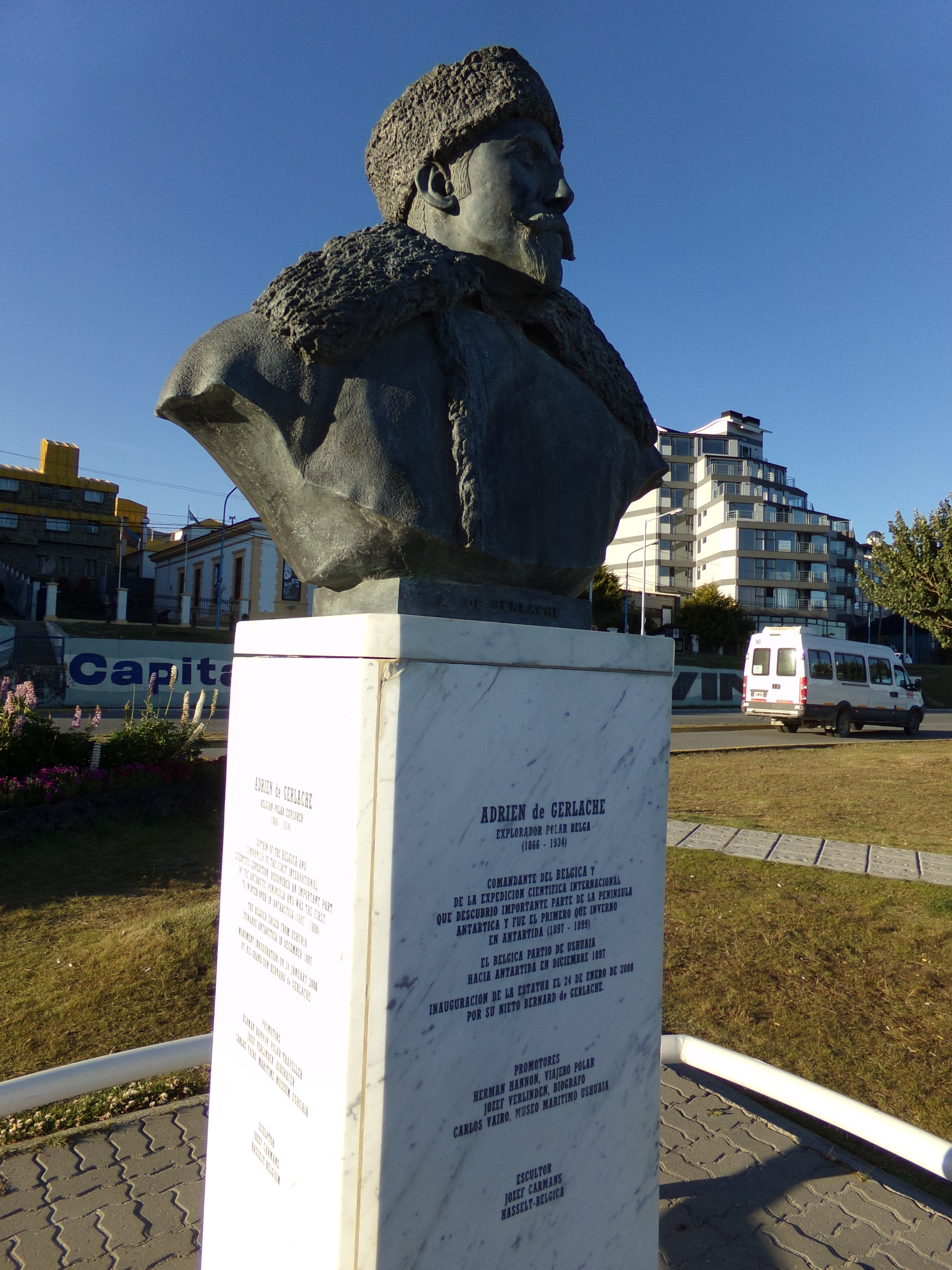
Monument to Adrien de Gerlache in Ushuaia, Tierra del Fuego Province, Argentina.

Several geographical features were named in his honour, mostly in Antarctica: Cape Gerlache, Mount Gerlache, Gerlache Inlet, Gerlache Island, Gerlache Strait and the de Gerlache seamounts, as well as Pic de Gerlache in Greenland and de Gerlache crater, near the lunar south pole. One of Antwerp's quays is named De Gerlachekaai.
