= Queen Fabiola Mountains =

Mountain range in Antarctica

Coordinates: 71°30′S 35°40′E

Location of Queen Fabiola Mountains in Queen Maud Land
Antarctica

Queen Fabiola Mountains is a group of mountains in Antarctica, 50 kilometres (30 miles) long, consisting mainly of seven small massifs which trend north–south, forming a partial barrier to the flow of inland ice. The mountains stand in isolation about 140 km (90 mi) southwest of the head of Lutzow-Holm Bay. The mountains were discovered and photographed from aircraft by the Belgian Antarctic Expedition under Guido Derom on 8 October 1960. With permission from King Baudouin of Belgium, the mountains were named after his newly wedded wife Fabiola. In November–December 1960, the mountains were visited by a party of the Japanese Antarctic Research Expedition (JARE), 1957–1962, which made geomorphological and geological surveys. They applied the name Yamato Mountains. The highest massif is Mount Fukushima (2,470 m).

The Japanese Antarctic Research Expedition (JARE) found the Yamato 000593 Martian meteorite in 2000 on the Yamato Glacier, at the Queen Fabiola Mountains. With a mass of 13.7 kg (30.2 lb), Yamato 000593 is the second largest meteorite from Mars found on Earth.

== See also ==
- List of mountains of Queen Maud Land
