= Belgica Mountains =

Chain of mountains in Queen Maud Land, Antarctica

- Location within Antarctica

Highest point
- Coordinates: 72°35′S 31°15′E

Geography
- Continent: Antarctica
- Region(s): Queen Maud Land, Eastern Antarctica

Belgica Mountains is an isolated chain of mountains about 10 miles (16 km) long, standing 60 miles (97 km) east-southeast of the Sor Rondane Mountains in Queen Maud Land, in the Antarctic. The chain was discovered by the Belgian Antarctic Expedition (1957-1958) under Gaston de Gerlache, and named after the ship Belgica, commanded by his father, Lt. Adrien de Gerlache, leader of the Belgian Antarctic Expedition of 1897–99.

== List of mountains ==
- Mount Bastin – 2,000 metres (6,562 ft) (72°32′S 31°15′E)
  A mountain standing 1 nautical mile (1.9 km) north of Mount Perov. Discovered by the Belgian Antarctic Expedition who named it for Captain Frank Bastin, who assisted in the scientific preparation of the expedition.
- Mount Boë – 2,520 metres (8,268 ft) (72°35′S 31°19′E)
  A mountain standing 1 nautical mile (1.9 km) northeast of Mount Victor. Discovered by the Belgian Antarctic Expedition, 1957–58, under G. de Gerlache, who named it for Captain Sigmund Boë, commander of the ship Polarhav, which transported the expedition.
- Mount Brouwer – 2,460 metres (8,071 ft) 72°35′S 31°26′E
  A mountain between Mount Hoge and Mount Launoit. Discovered by the Belgian Antarctic Expedition, 1957–58, who named it for Carl de Brouwer, a patron of the expedition.
- Mount Gillet – 2,460 metres (8,071 ft) 72°34′S 31°23′E
  A mountain standing just north of Mount Van der Essen. Discovered by the Belgian Antarctic Expedition, 1957–58, who named it for Charles Gillet, a patron of the expedition.
- Mount Hoge – 2,480 metres (8,136 ft) 72°34′S 31°23′E
  A mountain between Mount Van der Essen and Mount Brouwer. Discovered by the Belgian Antarctic Expedition, 1957–58, who named it for Edmond Hoge, member of the scientific committee of the expedition.
- Mount Imbert – 2,495 metres (8,186 ft) 72°35′S 31°28′E
  A mountain standing close northeast of Mount Launoit in the east part of the mountain range. Discovered by the Belgian Antarctic Expedition, 1957–58, who named it for Bertrand Imbert, leader of the French Antarctic Expedition, 1956–57.
- Mount Launoit – 2,470 metres (8,104 ft) 72°34′S 31°27′E
  A mountain between Mount Brouwer and Mount Imbert. Discovered by the Belgian Antarctic Expedition, 1958–59, who named it for Count de Launoit, President of the BRUFINA Society which gave financial assistance to the expedition.
- Mount Limburg Stirum – 2,350 metres (7,700 ft) (72°34′S 31°19′E)
  A mountain standing on the east side of Norsk Polarinstitutt Glacier and 1 nautical mile (2 km) north of Mount Boë. It was discovered by the Belgian Antarctic Expedition, 1957–58, under G. de Gerlache, who named it for Count Charles of Limburg Stirum, a patron of the expedition.
- Mount Perov – 2,380 metres (7,808 ft) 72°34′S 31°12′E
  A mountain just west of the terminus of Norsk Polarinstitutt Glacier. Discovered by the Belgian Antarctic Expedition, 1957–58, who named it for Commander V. Perov, Soviet pilot who came to the aid of four members of the Belgian Antarctic Expedition in December 1958.
- Mount Van Mieghem – 2,450 metres (8,038 ft) 72°36′S 31°14′E
  A mountain standing 1 mi south of Mount Perov. Discovered by the Belgian Antarctic Expedition, 1957–58, who named it for Prof. Jacques Van Mieghem, president of the scientific committee of the expedition.
- Mount Van der Essen – 2,525 metres (8,284 ft) 72°34′S 31°23′E
  A mountain just south of Mount Gillet. Discovered by the Belgian Antarctic Expedition, 1957–58, who named it for Alfred Van der Essen, director at the Ministry of Foreign Affairs and a patron of the expedition.
- Mount Victor – 2,590 metres (8,497 ft) 72°36′S 31°16′E
  A mountain between Mount Van Mieghem and Mount Boe. It was discovered by the Belgian Antarctic Expedition, 1957–58, who named it for the French polar explorer Paul-Émile Victor, a counselor of the expedition.
