= Gaston de Gerlache =

Belgian polar explorer (1919-2006)

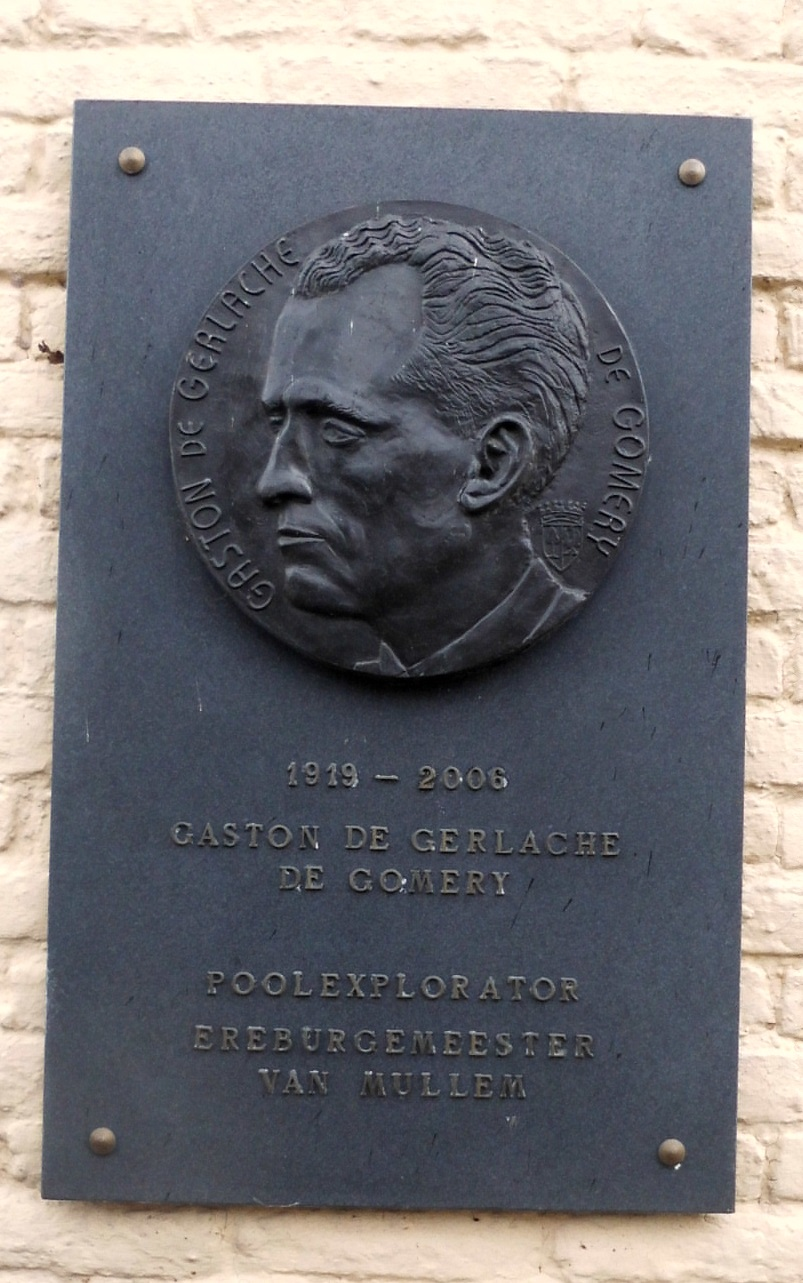

Baron Gaston de Gerlache de Gomery (Brussels, 17 November 1919 – Oudenaarde, 13 July 2006) was a Belgian polar explorer.

Gaston de Gerlache was the son of Adrien de Gerlache, and followed in the tracks of his father by leading the second Belgian expedition to Antarctica in 1957–1958, 60 years after his father led the 1897–1899 Belgian Antarctic Expedition aboard the ship Belgica.

Gaston de Gerlache and his crew established the King Baudouin Base in 1958 in the context of the International Geophysical Year. On 11 December 1958 an aircraft with four Belgians, led by Gaston de Gerlache crashed in the Crystal Mountains, 250 km from King Baudouin Base, Antarctica. The crew was searched for and rescued on 16 December by the Soviet polar pilot V. M. Perov on an Li-2 aircraft, that had taken off from Mirny Station.

In 1960 Gaston de Gerlache published his travel journal Retour dans l'antarctique. A year later he made a documentary about his expedition named Plein sud.

An article, "Belgium in the Antarctic", written by Gaston de Gerlache de Gomery appeared in the Geographical magazine (May 1962 issue).

Mount Gaston de Gerlache in the Queen Fabiola Mountains on Antarctica was named after him.
