= Belgian Antarctic Program =

Belgium was one of the 12 countries that initially negotiated and signed the Antarctic Treaty (Washington, 1959).

== History ==
The first Belgian expedition of scientific nature was led by Adrien de Gerlache aboard the Belgica. The expedition involved over wintering and spanned from 1897 to 1899. The findings of the expedition were put down as series of Résultats de voyage de la Belgica (in sixty-five volumes) which was commissioned and published by the Commission de la Belgica under the aegis of the Royal Academy.

The International Geophysical Year of 1957-58, required the establishment of a geophysical network throughout Antarctica. Belgium, along with ten other countries agreed to take part in this scientific exercise and established a research station named Base Roi Baudouin, on a floating ice shelf off the coast of Dronning Maud Land, a virtually unexplored part of Antarctica at that time. The station was set up on the first Belgian expedition (1957–59) to Antarctica led by Gaston de Gerlache, Adrien de Gerlache's son.

In the following two years the 2nd and 3rd expeditions were sent. The Belgian polar base was permanently staffed for the three expeditions, until late 1961 when the National Centre for Polar Research could not raise the funds needed to continue the Belgian Antarctic program.

In partnership with the Netherlands, the first Belgo-Dutch expedition (1963–65) not only reached the South Pole but also established a new Roi Baudoin Base less than 100 meters from the old one which had been buried in snow.

Twice for 3-year periods (1958–1961 and 1964–1966), the Roi Baudoin Base fulfilled its role as a geophysical observatory and as an operating base for geographical, glaciological, and geological mapping of the neighboring coastal and mountain areas. After the closure of the base in 1967, three further summer expeditions were sent in cooperation with South Africa, but in 1971 all governmental support for Antarctic research was temporarily halted.

1985 marked the start-up of the first multi-annual Belgian Antarctic science program, managed and financed by the Belgian Science Policy Office. It has continued till today.

== Mission, Research and Logistics ==
The broad objectives of the Belgian Antarctic Program financed by the Federal Science Policy since 1985 are:

- Maintain and strengthen the Belgian expertise, particularly in those areas of science where Belgian teams were known to be strong
- Increase the visibility of Belgium in the Antarctic Treaty System
- Contribute to the rational management of Antarctica's environment and natural resources
- Assess the consequences at the world scale of major natural processes occurring in the Antarctic and surrounding ocean

The themes covered by Belgian scientists can be brought under in four major disciplines:

- Marine biology and biogeochemistry
- Glaciology and climatology
- Hydrodynamics and sea-ice
- Marine geophysics

Before the construction of Princess Elisabeth Base which was fully completed in 2009, Belgium had no logistics support of its own for Antarctica since the former base was closed. All necessary fieldwork was carried out by participation of the Belgian researchers in campaigns organised by other countries based on the availability of vacant space on research vessels and in bases.

The new Belgian base will be open to scientists from all other Antarctic Treaty partner countries willing to perform research activities in the area.

== Research Stations ==
Inaugurated in 2009, Belgium built a new summer research station named Princess Elisabeth Base in Utsteinen in East Antarctic Dronning Maud Land. Coordinates: 71°57' South and 23°20' East.

== See also ==
- Belgian Antarctic Expedition
