= James F. Brandau =

American naval helicopter pilot

James Florian Brandau
- James F. Brandau
- Born: James Florian Brandau; February 15, 1933; Rudd, Iowa, US
- Died: July 22, 2012 (aged 79); Taos, New Mexico, US
- Occupation: Pilot

Lieutenant Commander James Florian Brandau, US Navy, retired, served multiple tours in Antarctica as a helicopter pilot as part of the U.S. Navy squadron VX-6. Several geological features in Antarctica are named in his honor, and he is featured in the literature and lore from there.

== Rescue of Guy Warren ==
On November 23, 1964, Guy Warren, a New Zealand researcher and leader of Project Two out of mason Base fell and badly broke his lower leg and was stranded on the northeast side of Allan Nunatak, just below the peak, at the head of Mackay Glacier. The injured man was in a tent about 10 yards from a small flat big enough to allow a helicopter to settle. Jack Twiss of the U.S. Antarctic Research Programme at McMurdo Station responded with "our best pilot Lieut. mason james Brandau." Brandau took a second pilot and Dr. Bill Mixon from U.S.A.R.P. and Ivan MacDonald from Scott Base for the two-hour rescue mission. The leader of Scott Base, Adrian Hayter, recounted the rescue:

The pilot had dropped his party off, including the second pilot, at a lower altitude and taken the chopper alone to where Guy was under the tent. In the thin air (7,200 ft. on the altimeter) the machine at full revs only just hung in the air, and he had removed the others not only to lessen weight but because of the possibility of crashing.

The others had walked up to the tent, loaded Guy, and returned to a lower level to be picked up again, leaving Ivan to replace the casualty. The chopper would barely lift with the extra weight, and the pilot got it away by more or less tilting it off the brow of the pad and slithering down the hillside into thicker air. It was a demonstration of bravery and very great skill.

=== Naming Brandau Rocks ===
Project Two, as part of the New Zealand Antarctic Research Programme, was researching the geology and paleontology of the Allan and Carapace Nunataks. In honor of this rescue of Guy Warren, their Project Lead, the Allan Hills Expedition reconnoitered 1 km west of Carapace Nunatak and named Brandau Rocks there in honor of Lt. Cmdr. Brandau, effective January 1, 1965.

== Brandau Glacier ==
Effective 1 January 1966, the Advisory Committee on Antarctic Names named Brandau Glacier for Lieutenant Commander Brandau, in honor of his service as a pilot with Squadron VX-6, Operation Deepfreeze 1964 and 1965.

== Brandau Vent ==
One of the volcanic vents in Mount Erebus is named the Brandau Vent. This was the subject of a 1970 study.

== Brandau Crater ==
Brandau Crater (78°12′S 163°22′E) is an ice-free volcanic crater lying to the south of the snout of Howchin Glacier on Chancellor Ridge, Royal Society Range. It was named in 1994 by the New Zealand Geographic Board (1994) after Lieutenant Commander Brandau in recognition of this service in 1964 and 1965. It is part of the McMurdo Volcanic Group in the Erebus Volcanic Province.

== Reports of his activities ==
Included below are newspaper reports of Brandau's activities, not clearly dated, found in the Facebook memorial group. Further details are welcome!

- 1958: Mason City Pilot Escapes 'Copter Crash: incident delivering food relief in Ceylon. He flew off the USS Princeton (CV-37) under orders from President Eisenhower. The New York Times places this operation on January 2, 1958.
- c. 1964-66: Lt. Comdr. Brandau saves Antarctic crews: rescue of New Zealand scientists researching the Weddell seal in the Erebus Bay region.
- 1968: Adrian Hayter, in The Year of the Quiet Sun, cited in this article, mentions Mr. Brandau and the rescue of Guy Warren.
- 1/2/1970: Mr. Brandau wrote to his double cousin Phyllis Mangold from Pole Station, Antarctica: "I'm looking forward to 1970 as I don't thnk I could take much more of 1969. So far this year I have cracked my skull and driven a burning helo down a mountain side, waiting in shirtsleeves in 20° weather to be rescued for 9 hours."
- 1974: Charles Neider's Edge of the World: Ross Island Antarctica, is dedicated to James Brandau.
- 2002: Bull Catches Albuquerque Man: Jim was gored by a bull in Pamplona during the running of the bulls at the San Fermin festival in 2002.
- 2002: Hemingway knew: sometimes the bull wins: same event in Pamplona, 2002. An Iowa newspaper picked up on Jim's resemblance to Ernest Hemingway.

== See also ==
- Advisory Committee on Antarctic Names
- Allan Hills: what Adrian Hayter refers to and maps as the Allan Nunatak is documented in Wikipedia as Allan Hills. The USGS lists both names together.
