= Elephant Moraine =

Elephant Moraine (76°17′S 157°20′E) is an isolated moraine, 3 nautical miles (6 km) long, located 27 nautical miles (50 km) west of Reckling Peak, to the west of the head of Mawson Glacier in Victoria Land, Antarctica. The moraine, described in some reports as an ice core moraine, is situated along a long, narrow patch of bare ice that extends west from Reckling Peak for 60 nautical miles (110 km). The feature was noted in U.S. satellite imagery of 1973, and in aerial photographs obtained subsequently, by William R. MacDonald of the United States Geological Survey, who originally described it to William A. Cassidy as "a possible nunatak having an outline similar to an elephant." Several United States Antarctic Research Program field parties led by Cassidy collected meteorites at this moraine during the 1979–80 ANSMET season, including the Martian meteorite EETA 79001. The descriptive name was approved by the Advisory Committee on Antarctic Names in 1989.
