= Allan Hills =

Antarctica land forms

- Location within Antarctica

Highest point
- Coordinates: 76°42′S 159°42′E

Dimensions
- Length: 22 km (14 mi)

Geography
- Continent: Antarctica
- Region(s): Oates Land and Victoria Land
- Parent range: Transantarctic Mountains System
- Borders on: Coombs Hills

Geology
- Rock type(s): Jurassic Mawson Formation, Permian Weller Formation, Triassic Feather Formation, Triassic Lashley Formation, Ferrar Dolerite, Meteorites

The Allan Hills (76°42′S 159°42′E) are a group of hills, mainly ice free and about 12 nautical miles (22 km; 14 mi) long, lying just north-west of the Coombs Hills near the heads of Mawson Glacier and Mackay Glacier in the Oates Land and Victoria Land regions of Antarctica.

== Exploration and naming ==
The Allan Hills were mapped by the New Zealand party (1957–58) of the Commonwealth Trans-Antarctic Expedition and named for Professor R. S. Allan of the University of Canterbury, New Zealand. Allan Hills is referred to as the Allan Nunatak, and mapped north of Carapace Nunatak, in the memoirs of the Scott Base Leader Adrian Hayter. Both names are in the USGS listing.

== Location ==
Allan Hills lie to the north of Odell Glacier, facing Coombs Hills to the south of the glacier. They are west of the Convoy Range, south of Battlements Nunatak and east of the Antarctic Plateau. Allan Hills are in the shape of the letter "Y", with the open end pointing roughly northwards, and encompassing the Shimmering Icefield. The southern end of the Y starts at Ballance Peak and proceeds northward, encompassing the Feistmantel Valley and Mount Watters, before it splits into the northwest Tilman Ridge and the northeast Shipton Ridge.

== Meteorites ==
According to William A. Cassidy, describing the 1976–1977 ANSMET meteorite collecting season, "Looking across the Mackay Glacier at the great sky-blue patches of ice beyond Mount Brooke, we were looking for the first time at ice that had a tremendous upstream collecting area. We were looking at Meteorite Heaven... The closest mapped feature to the ice patch north of the Mackay Glacier was a low-lying, roughly Y-shaped ridge called Allan Hills." During his second collecting season, Cassidy camped at what he called the Allan Hills Main Icefield, "a major concentration of meteorites," and made reconnaissance visits to nearby ice patches, Allan Hills Near Western, Allan Hills Middle Western and Allan Hills Far Western Icefields. They collected their first lunar meteorite, ALHA 81005, during the 1981–82 field season in the Middle Western Icefield. The Martian meteorite ALHA 77005 was collected in 1977 at Allan Hills, while ALH 84001 was collected on the Allan Hills Far Western Icefield during the 1984–85 season.

ALH 84001, arguably the most famous meteorite from Allan Hills, was found in 1996 to have features in the likeness of microscopic fossils of bacteria which suggested the highly controversial claim that there was once life on Mars, leading to Bill Clinton making a speech about the meteorite and its implications if the hypothesis were confirmed. Later, the microscopic features had been able to be explained via means not requiring life to be present, leading to a majority of the scientific community rejecting this hypothesis.

== Geology ==
The Jurassic Mawson Formation outcrops from Ballance Point until where these two ridges come together, and the Permian Weller Formation outcrops. Along the Shipton Ridge, the Triassic Feather Formation lies next to the Weller, followed by the Triassic Lashley Formation, which continues from Halle Flat and Roscolyn Tor, through Toltec Butte, until the northerly end of the ridge at Lavallee Point. Ferrar Dolerite is exposed at Coxcomb Peak. Along the Tilman Ridge, the Feather and Lashley formations outcrop along the ridge at Ship Cone and Townrow Peak respectively, but the Jurassic Ferrar Dolerite outcrops at Stopes Point, the end of the ridge.

== Tilman Ridge features ==
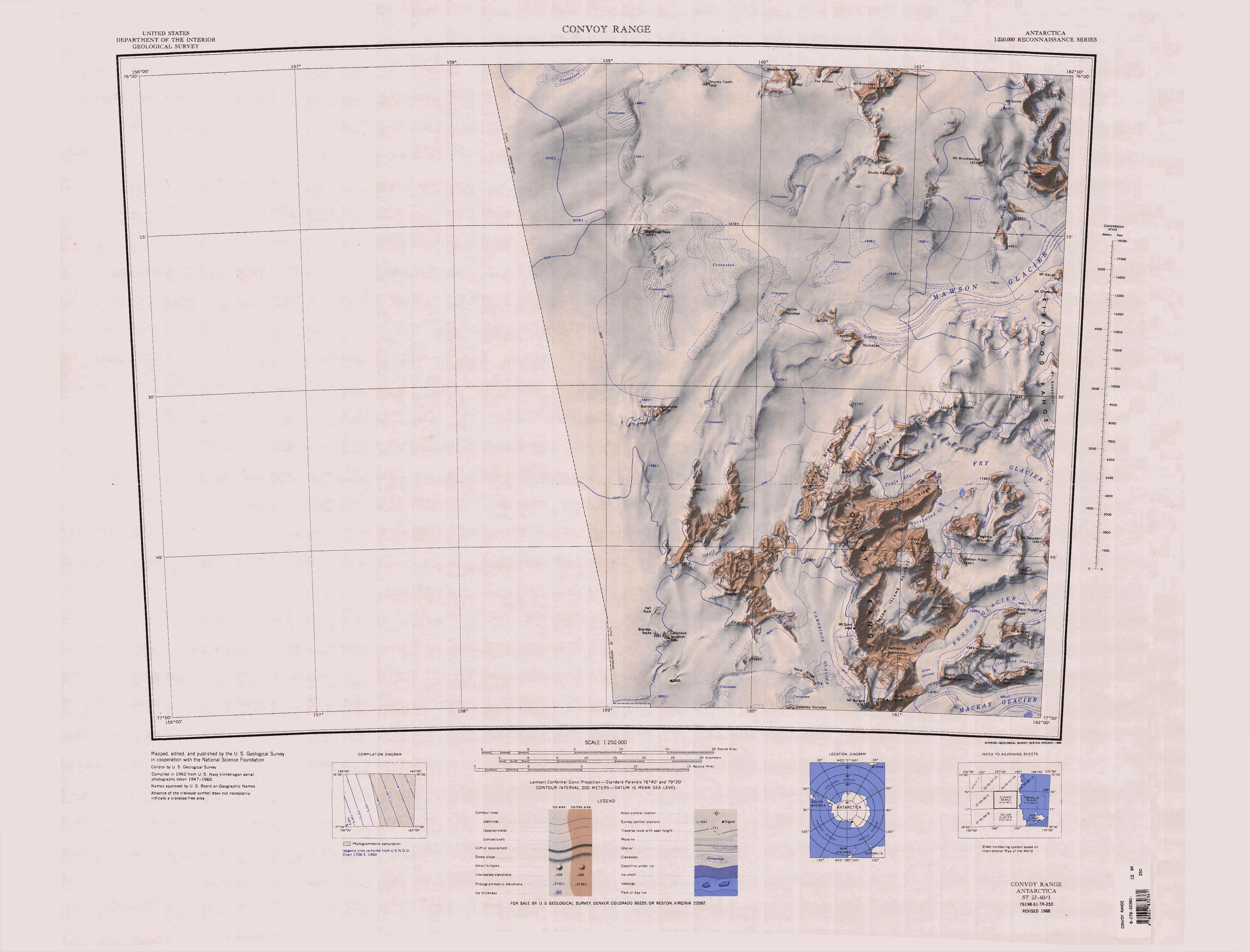
Hills are to southwest of map

Features of the Tilman Ridge include:

=== Tilman Ridge ===
76°40′S 159°35′E. A ridge forming the northwestern arm of the Allan Hills. Reconnoitered by the NZARP Allan Hills Expedition (1964) who gave the name after W.H. Tilman, a mountaineering associate of Shipton and Odell, after whom the nearby Shipton Ridge and Odell Glacier are named.

=== Stopes Point ===
76°36′S 159°35′E. The northernmost point on Tilman Ridge, the northwestern arm of the Allan Hills. Reconnoitered by the NZARP Allan Hills Expedition, 1964, and named after Marie Slopes, authority on Carboniferous palaeobotany, and hence associated with the geology of the area.

=== Townrow Peak ===
76°38′S 159°35′E. A prominent outlier of the Tilman Ridge. Reconnoitered by the NZARP Allan Hills Expedition (1964) and named after J.A. Townrow of the University of Tasmania, palaeobotanist with the expedition.

=== Shimmering Icefield ===
76°39′S 159°44′E. An icefield between the Shipton and Tilman Ridges. Reconnoitered by the NZARP Allan Hills Expedition (1964) who gave the name because of its frequently nacreous luster when viewed against the sun.

=== Ship Cone ===
76°40′S 159°35′E. A conical peak 1 nautical mile (1.9 km; 1.2 mi) south of Townrow Peak on the Tilman Ridge. Reconnoitered by the NZARP Allan Hills Expedition, 1964, who gave the name after a similarly shaped peak in the Hokonui Hills, New Zealand.

=== Gadarene Ridge ===
76°42′S 159°33′E. A ridge extending southward from Ship Cone. Reconnoitered by the NZARP Allan Hills Expedition (1964) who gave the name because of the swine-backed appearance of the feature in profile.

== Northern features ==
Features along the north of Shipton Ridge, from north to south, were reconnoitered and given names by the New Zealand Antarctic Research Programme (NZARP) Allan Hills Expedition, 1964. They include:

=== Shipton Ridge ===
76°40′S 159°51′E. The main ridge forming the northeastern arm of the Allan Hills. The Allan Hills Expedition named it after Eric Shipton, Himalayan mountaineer, because of his association with Professor N.E. Odell, for whom the adjacent Odell Glacier is named.

=== Lavallee Point ===
76°37′S 159°50′E. The northernmost point of Shipton Ridge in the Allan Hills. The Allan Hills Expedition named the point after Lieutenant Lavallee, United States Navy, who assisted in establishing the expedition in the Allan Hills.

=== Plumstead Valley ===
76°37′S 159°49′E. A valley at the northern end of Shipton Ridge, east of Kirkcaldy Spur. The Allan Hills Expedition named it after Doctor Edna P. Plumstead for her work on Glossopteris fossils, especially those from Antarctica.

=== Kirkaldy Spur ===
76°38′S 159°48′E. A rock spur to the north of Coxcomb Peak in northern Shipton Ridge, Allan Hills, Victoria Land. The spur was named by the Allan Hills Expedition after John Francis Kirkaldy (1908–90) Professor of Geology, Queen Mary College, London. (Note: From 1965 the name was spelled "Kirkcaldy Spur". This was changed in 2009 to "Kirkaldy Spur" to match "John Francis Kirkaldy", after whom it was named.)

=== Coxcomb Peak ===
76°38′S 159°49′E. A dolerite elevation which overlooks the south end of Plumstead Valley in the Allan Hills. The Allan Hills Expedition gave the name because of the jaunty appearance of the feature in profile.

=== Harris Valley ===
76°38′S 159°52′E. A valley just east of Coxcomb Peak. The Allan Hills Expedition gave the name after Professor Thomas Maxwell Harris who has made outstanding contributions to Mesozoic paleobotany.

=== Toltec Butte ===
76°38′S 159°53′E. A truncated peak east of Harris Valley in the Shipton Ridge. The Allan Hills Expedition named the feature for its resemblance to buildings of the civilization of the same name.

=== Maiden Castle ===
76°39′S 159°50′E. A prominent rock feature east of Halle Flat. The Allan Hills Expedition named it because of the resemblance to a pre-Roman earthwork named Maiden Castle in Dorsetshire, England.

=== Halle Flat ===
76°40′S 159°50′E. A relatively flat area just southward of Coxcomb Peak. The Allan Hills Expedition gave the name after Thore Gustaf Halle, whose pioneering work (1913) on Antarctic fossil plants forms part of the scientific reports on Otto Nordenskjöld's Swedish Antarctic Expedition of 1901-04.

=== Warren Peak ===
76°41′S 159°52′E. A high rock peak southeast of Halle Flat. The Allan Hills Expedition named it after Guyon Warren, from whose initiative the expedition was conceived and organized, but who only participated in the expedition for part of the time because of an accident.

=== Dennes Point ===
76°41′S 159°45′E. A dolerite point projecting into Shimmering Icefield from the western side of Shipton Ridge. The Allan Hills Expedition named it after a similar dolerite feature, Dennes Point on Bruny Island, Tasmania.

== Southern features ==
Named features along the south of Shipton Ridge, from north to south, include:

=== Punchbowl Cirque ===
76°42′S 159°47′E. A cirque in the southern part of Shipton Ridge, about 0.5 nautical miles (0.93 km; 0.58 mi) southwest of Roscolyn Tor. The Allan Hills Expedition gave the descriptive name.

=== Roscolyn Tor ===
76°42′S 159°50′E. A high sandstone feature about 1 nautical mile (1.9 km; 1.2 mi) southwest of Warren Peak. The Allan Hills Expedition gave the name after a similar feature in Anglesey, Wales.

=== Windwhistle Peak ===
76°42′S 159°46′E. A square sandstone peak south of Punchbowl Cirque. The Allan Hills Expedition so named the peak because of the peculiar behavior of the wind in its vicinity.

=== Brock Gully ===
77°43′S 159°44′E. A valley 1 nautical mile (1.9 km; 1.2 mi) south of Windwhistle Peak in the Allan Hills. The Allan Hills Expedition named it after the dialect name for a badger because of the resemblance to badger country in parts of England.

=== Todd Gully ===
76°43′S 159°42′E. A valley about 0.7 nautical miles (1.3 km; 0.81 mi) west of Brock Gully. The Allan Hills Expedition named it after the dialect name for a fox because of the resemblance to fox country in parts of England.

=== Feistmantel Valley ===
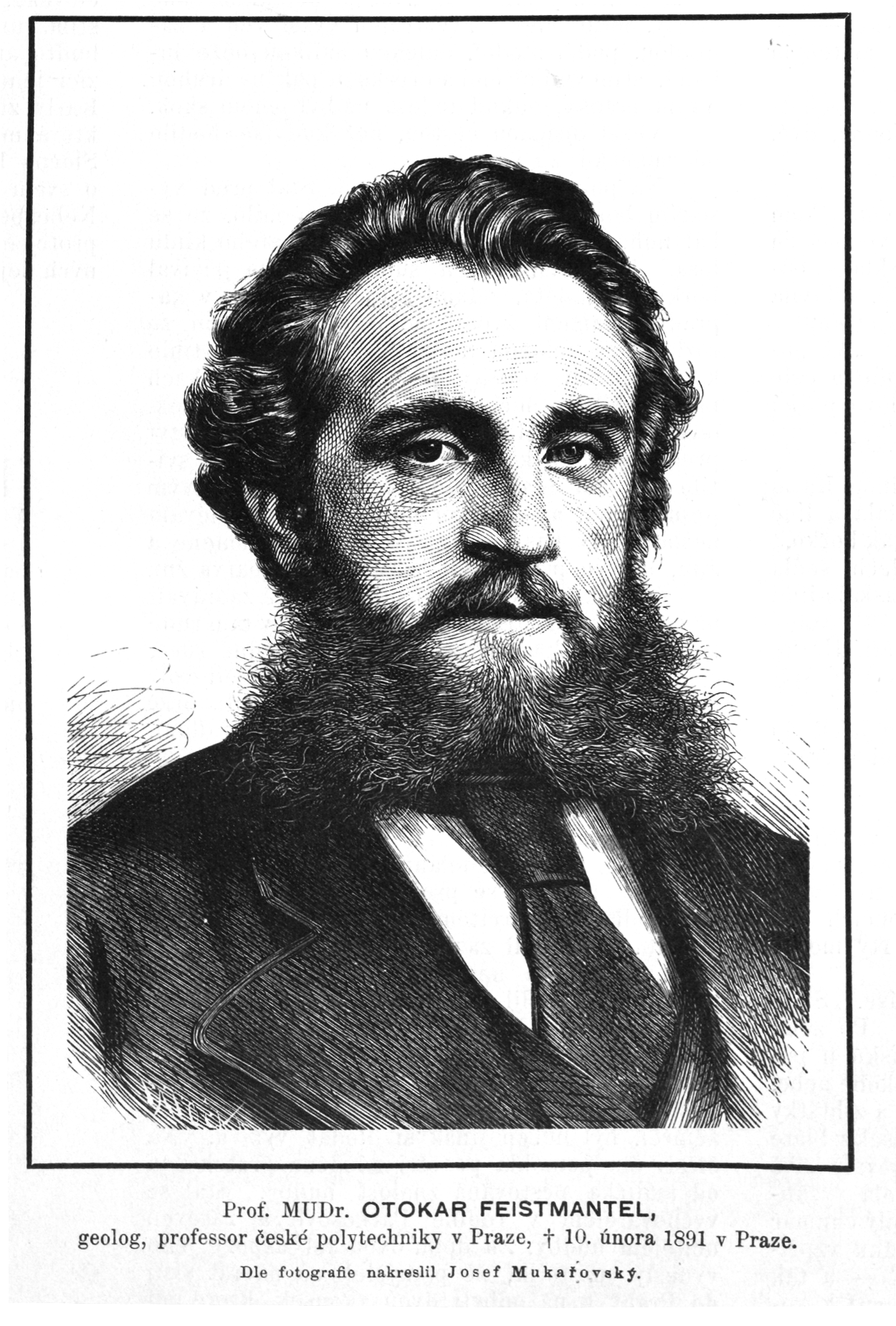
Otakar Feistmantel

76°43′S 159°35′E. A fossiliferous valley lying south of Shimmering Icefield and west of Mount Walters. The Allan Hills Expedition named it after Professor Otokar Feistmantel, who made pioneering studies of Gondwana flora.

=== Mixon Rocks ===
76°43′S 159°23′E. Rock outcrops about 2.5 nautical miles (4.6 km; 2.9 mi) west of Gadarene Ridge. The Allan Hills Expedition named this feature for Lieutenant William A. Mixon, a United States Navy medical officer at McMurdo Station who treated an injured member of the expedition.

=== Trudge Valley ===
76°43′S 159°45′E. A valley on the southern side of Windwhistle Peak in the Allan Hills. The Allan Hills Expedition named it after the many journeys along its length.

=== Scythian Nunatak ===
76°44′S 159°47′E. An isolated ridge about 1 nautical mile (1.9 km; 1.2 mi) southeast of Trudge Valley. The Allan Hills Expedition found the feature to be continually shrouded in drifting snow and named it after the land of the Scythians which, according to the Romans, had this peculiarity in common.

=== Mount Watters ===
76°44′S 159°38′E. A massive peak westward of Scythian Nunatak. The Allan Hills Expedition named it after W.A. Watters, a geologist with the expedition.

=== Ballance Peak ===
76°46′S 159°29′E. The highest peak at the southern end of the Allan Hills. The Allan Hills Expedition named it for P.P. Ballance, a geologist with the expedition.

=== MacDonald Spur ===
76°47′S 159°33′E. A long, low ridge extending eastward from Ballance Peak. The Allan Hills Expedition named it for Ivan MacDonald, field assistant with the expedition.

== Sources ==
- Alberts, Fred G., ed. (1995), Geographic Names of the Antarctic (PDF) (2 ed.), United States Board on Geographic Names This article incorporates public domain material from websites or documents of the United States Board on Geographic Names.
- Cassidy, William (2003), Meteorites, Ice, and Antarctica: A personal account, Cambridge: Cambridge University Press, pp. 34–36, 42–43, 115, 122, 145–147, ISBN 9780521258722
- Convoy Range, United States Geological Survey
- Elliott, David; Grimes, Craig (2011), "Triassic and Jurassic strata at Coombs Hills, south Victoria Land: stratigraphy, petrology and cross-cutting breccia pipes", Antarctic Science, 23 (3): 268–280, Bibcode:2011AntSc..23..268E, doi:10.1017/S0954102010000994, S2CID 130680092
- Hayter, Adrian (1968), The Year of the Quiet Sun: One year at Scott Base, Antarctica: a personal impression., London: Hadder and Stoughton
- "Kirkaldy Spur", Geographic Names Information System, United States Geological Survey, United States Department of the Interior

This article incorporates public domain material from websites or documents of the United States Geological Survey.
