= Brandau =

Brandau may refer to:

- Brandau, district in Modautal
- Brandau (surname)
- Brandau Crater, volcano
- Brandau Glacier, glacier
- Brandau Rocks, rock formation
- Brandov, a village in the Czech Republic
