= List of lunar meteorites =

This is a list of lunar meteorites. That is, meteorites that have been identified as having originated from Earth's Moon.

Meteorite	Found	Mass (g)	Notes
Lahmada 020	2018	12170	feldspathic breccia
Yamato 791197	1979	52	feldspathic regolith breccia
Yamato 793169	1979	6	mare basalt
Yamato 793274/981031	1980–1999	195	anorthosite-bearing basaltic regolith breccia
ALH A81005	1981	31	feldspathic regolith breccia; FIRST RECOGNISED LUNAR METEORITE
Yamato 82192/82193/86032	1983–1986	712	feldspathic fragmental breccia
EET 87521/96008	1987–1996	84	basaltic or gabbroic fragmental breccia
Asuka 881757	1988	442	mare basalt, "ortho" cumulate
MAC 88104/88105	1989	724	feldspathic regolith breccia
Calcalong Creek	~1990	19	basalt-bearing feldspathic regolith breccia
QUE 93069/94269	1993–1994	24	feldspathic regolith breccia
QUE 94281	1994	23	anorthosite-bearing basaltic regolith breccia
Dar al Gani 262/996	1997–1999	525	feldspathic regolith breccia
Dar al Gani 400	1998	1425	feldspathic regolith breccia
Dhofar 081/280/910/1224	1999–2003	572	feldspathic glassy-matrix fragmental breccia
NWA 5000	1999	11500	feldspathic breccia
Yamato 983885	1999	290	basalt-bearing feldspathic regolith breccia
Kalahari 008/009	1999	14100	feldspathic regolith breccia & basaltic fragmental breccia
NWA 032/479	1999–2001	456	mare basalt
unnamed	2000		feldspathic regolith breccia
Northwest Africa (NWA) 482	2000?	1015	feldspathic impact-melt breccia
Dhofar 025/301/304/308	2000	772	feldspathic regolith breccia
Dhofar 026/457/458/459/460/461/462/463/464/465/466/467/468	2000–2001	709	feldspathic granulitic breccia
NEA 003	2000–2001	124	mare basalt with basaltic impact-melt breccia
NWA 773/2700/2727/2977/3160/3333?	2000–2005	1156	complex fragmental and regolith breccia consisting of basalt and cumulate olivine gabbro
Dhofar 287	2001	154	mare basalt with regolith breccia
Dhofar 302	2001	4	feldspathic impact-melt breccia
Dhofar 303/305/306/307/309/310/311/489/730/731/908/909/911/950/1085	2001–2003	1037	feldspathic impact-melt breccia
Dhofar 490/1084	2001–2003	124	feldspathic fragmental breccia
MET 01210	2001	22.8	anorthosite-bearing basaltic regolith breccia
Dhofar 733	2002	98	feldspathic granulitic breccia
Northeast Africa (NEA) 001	2002	262	feldspathic regolith breccia
SaU 169	2002	206	KREEP-rich, mafic impact-melt breccia & regolith breccia
LAP 02205/02224/02226/02436/03632/04841	2002–2005	1930	mare basalt
PCA 02007	2003	22	feldspathic regolith breccia
Dhofar 925/960/961	2003	106	basalt-bearing feldspathic impact-melt breccia
NWA 2200	2004	552	feldspathic impact-melt breccia
unnamed	2004	24.2	feldspathic breccia
SaU 300	2004	153	basalt-bearing feldspathic regolith breccia
NWA 3136	2004	95	anorthosite-bearing basaltic regolith breccia
NWA 3163	2005	1634	feldspathic granulitic breccia
Dhofar 1180	2005	115	basalt-bearing feldspathic fragmental or regolith breccia
NWA 2995	2005	538	basalt bearing feldspathic fragmental breccia
MIL 05035	2005	142	mare basalt
unnamed	2005	26	
unnamed	2005	68	mare basalt
Dhofar 1428	2006	213	feldspathic impact-melt breccia
unnamed	2006	18.7	feldspathic breccia
NWA 2998 [provisional]	2006	183	feldspathic breccia
NWA 4472/4485 [provisional]	2006	185	
Shisr 162 (Shişr 162)	17 Feb 2006	5525	feldspathic breccia
Anoual	2006	5.9	Found in Morocco
Aridal 017	2016	590	Found in Morocco
AaU 012	2012	122.8	Abar al' Uj 012, Saudi Arabia
NWA 10309	2015	16520	feldspathic breccia. Largest known lunar meteorite as of October 2018.
NWA 11789	2017	5492	feldspathic breccia
NWA 11228	2017	140	feldspathic breccia [6]
NWA 14685	2020	8000	fragmental breccia
NWA 11444	2017	1323	melt breccia
NWA 11182	2017	60	feldspathic breccia

== Notes ==
Where multiple meteorites are listed (e.g. NWA 4472/4485), they are believed to be pieces of the same original body. The mass shown is the total.

- AaU -
- ALH – Allan Hills, Antarctica
- Asuka – Antarctica
- Calcalong Creek – Australia
- Dar al Gani – Libya
- Dho - Dhofar, Oman
- EET – Elephant Moraine, Antarctica
- Kalahari – Botswana
- LAP – LaPaz Icefield, Antarctica
- MAC – MacAlpine Hills, Antarctica
- MET – Meteorite Hills, Antarctica
- MIL – Miller Range, Antarctica
- NEA – Northeast Africa: Sudan
- NWA – Northwest Africa: Morocco, Algeria
- PCA – Pecora Escarpment, Antarctica
- QUE – Queen Alexandra Range, Antarctica
- SaU – Sayh al Uhaymir, Oman
- Yamato – Antarctica

Source: Washington University in St. Louis, Department of Earth and Planetary Science.

== See also ==
- Glossary of meteoritics
- List of Martian meteorites
