= Allan Hills 77005 =

Martian meteorite found in Antarctica

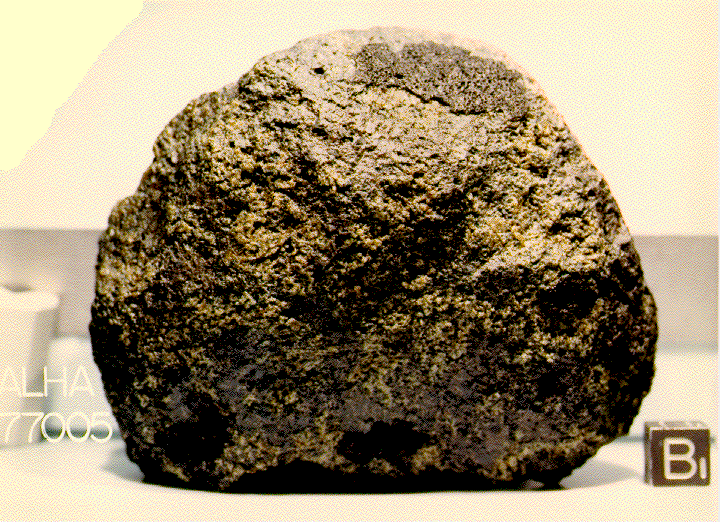
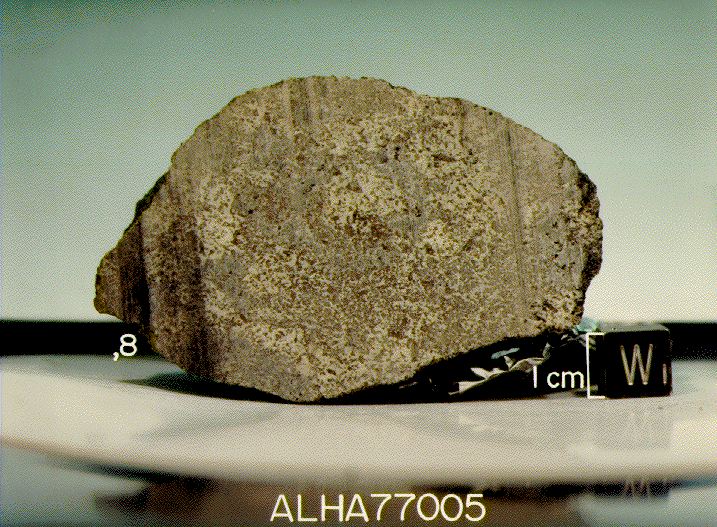
- Exterior Interior Meteorite ALH-77005
- Type: Achondrite (unique), lherzolite
- Clan: Martian meteorite
- Composition: ~55% olivine, ~35% pyroxene, ~8% maskelynite and ~2% opaques
- Shock stage: S6
- Weathering grade: A
- Country: Antarctica
- Region: Allan Hills
- Coordinates: 76°43′00″S 159°40′00″E
- Observed fall: No
- Found date: 29 December 1977 (Japanese National Institute of Polar Research mission)
- TKW: 482.5 g
- Related media on Wikimedia Commons

Allan Hills 77005 (also known as Allan Hills A77005, ALHA77005, ALH77005 and ALH-77005) is a Martian meteorite that was found in the Allan Hills of Antarctica in 1977 by a Japanese National Institute of Polar Research mission team and ANSMET. Like other members of the group of SNCs (shergottite, nakhlite, chassignite), ALH-77005 is thought to be from Mars.

== Description ==
On discovery, the mass of ALH-77005 was 482.5 g (1.064 lb). Initial geological examination determined that the meteorite was composed of ~55% olivine, ~35% pyroxene, ~8% maskelynite and ~2% opaques.

In March 2019, researchers reported the possibility of biosignatures in this Martian meteorite based on its microtexture and morphology as detected with optical microscopy and FTIR-ATR microscopy, and on the detection of mineralized organic compounds, suggesting that microbial life could have existed on the planet Mars. More broadly, and as a result of their studies, the researchers suggest Solar System materials should be carefully studied to determine whether there may be signs of microbial forms within other space rocks as well.

== See also ==
- Allan Hills 84001
- Glossary of meteoritics
- History of Mars observation
- Life on Mars
- List of Martian meteorites on Earth
- List of meteorites on Mars
- Nakhla meteorite
- Mars sample return mission
- Panspermia
- Shergotty meteorite
- Water on Mars
