= Brindeau (surname) =

Brindeau is a French surname.

== List of people with the surname ==
- Jeanne Brindeau (1860–1946), French stage and film actress
- Pascal Brindeau (born 1974), French politician

== See also ==
- Brandau (surname)
