= Elephant Moraine 79001 =

Meteorite found in Antarctica

Elephant Moraine 79001, also known as EETA 79001, is a Martian meteorite. It was found in Elephant Moraine, in the Antarctic during the 1979–1980 collecting season.

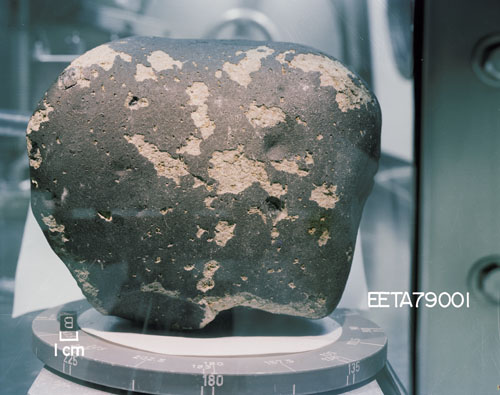
EETA79001 NASA photo # S80-37633

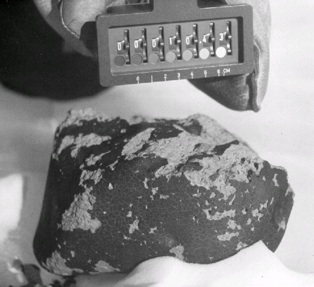
An image showing EETA79001 as found in Antarctica, NASA photo # S80-28838

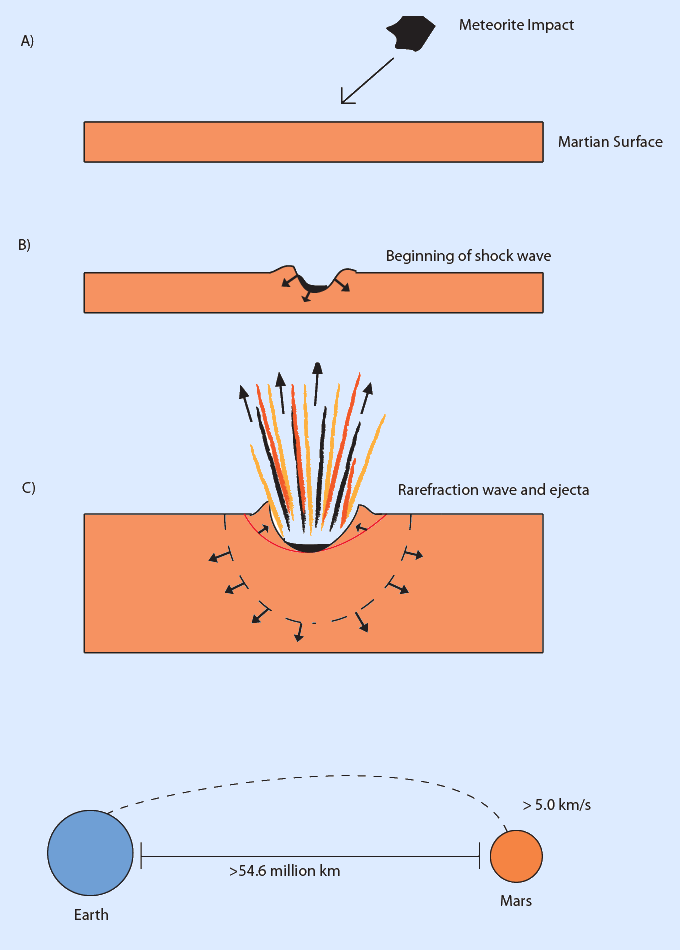
Impact and ejection sequence of a Martian meteorite. At time A, the impact of meteorite in imminent. At time B, the meteorite has impacted, melting and introducing a large amount of energy into the surface. This surface energy propagates as a shock wave. At time C, the shock wave continues to propagate, a rarefraction wave pushes back towards the crater in response, and material is ejected from the crater. If any of this material is moving at a rate faster than the escape velocity (5.0 km/s) of Mars, it may leave the influence of Martian gravity. Mars has a minimum distance from Earth of 54.6 million km that the ejecta would then have to travel with the perfect trajectory (dashed line) to impact on Earth. This is, in part, why Martian meteorites are rare on Earth.

The meteorite is classified as a shergottite and is primarily basaltic in composition. EETA 79001 is the second largest Martian meteorite found on Earth, at approximately 7900 grams; only the Zagami meteorite is larger. It is a very young rock, by geologic standards, dating to only about 180 million years ago, and was ejected from the Martian surface about 600 thousand years ago.

Location of discovery of EETA 79001, in Elephant Moraine, near Reckling Peak, Victoria Land, Antarctica

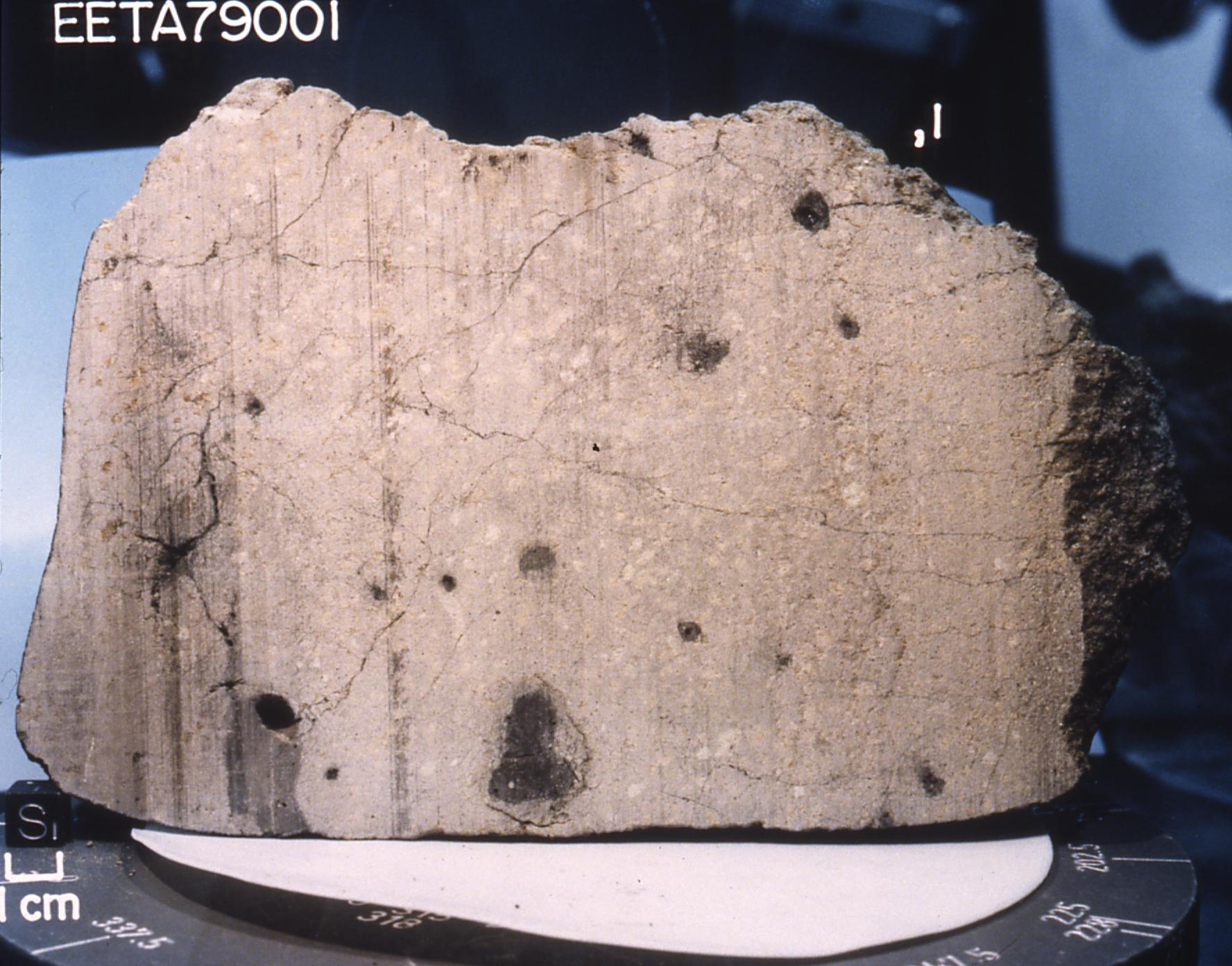
View of a slice of the Meteorite EETA 79001, showing dark glass inclusions containing distinct isotopic compositions. These were used to positively identify EETA 79001 as Martian in origin.

== Discovery ==
EETA 79001 was discovered at the Elephant Moraine, near Reckling Peak, Victoria Land, Antarctica. It was especially significant due to the fact that it had glass inclusions that were found to contain rare nitrogen isotopic compositions. These same compositions were measured in the Martian atmosphere by the Viking spacecraft in 1976. This match was some of the first crucial evidence to positively identify the EETA 79001 meteorite, and others of its class, to be of Martian origin. EETA 79001 was considered to be proven of Martian origin, after much debate, in 1985 by R.O. Pepin by comparing and expanding findings of the Viking and further isotopic analysis of EETA 79001.

Stony Martian meteorites, as a whole, are described as being part of the "SNC" group of rocks. This stands for shergottites, nakhlites, and chassignites. These meteorites are distinguished by their shared isotopic compositions which are common with Martian composition, and differ from Earth compositions.

== Macroscopic descriptions ==
The meteorite is made up of two distinct lithologies, designated as lithology A and lithology B. Lithology B is an igneous melt, almost certainly originating deep in the Martian crust. Lithology A has some uncertainty associated with it, but appears to be made up of shocked, impact melt from the collision that caused the ejection of EETA 79001.

The meteorite is a nearly completely crystalline rock, with a composition typical of volcanic lava crystallized from molten silicate. The sample closely resembles that of basalts collected from Earth and the Moon. Close examination of this sample shows glassy feldspar, which can be shown to have formed under unique conditions, common with impact shock. This glass retains its original structure, showing evidence for no flow having occurred. This process is likely caused due to intense shock waves, such as a large meteoric impact.

== Mineralogical descriptions ==
The main mass of the meteorite is a shocked pyroxene. Large pyroxene grains range up to 3.5 mm. A few large olivines also occur, as large as 2.5 mm.

The less abundant lithology, lithology B, resembles fine grained shergotty. The major minerals are maskelynite and clinopyroxene, with small occurrence of calcium phosphate, magnetite, silicate, and ilmenite.

Dark glass appears throughout, connected with thin veinlits. This glass is of melted origin.

== Importance ==
=== Martian meteors ===
EETA 79001 has been shown to originate from the Martian interior, so holds great importance because of the clues it can provide about the composition and evolution of Mars. It was the first sample that provided conclusive evidence of an origin from Mars. The idea of meteorites ejected from other planets was at first not popular with scientists, as they believed such an impact would completely melt the ejected debris, EETA 79001 showed that while some portion is likely melted from impact, original rock crystals can survive the process. This meteorite is one of only 99 known meteorites discovered on Earth, of Martian origin. Martian meteorites were critical in our early understanding of a planet that is both a close neighbor and physically very similar to Earth. Before lander missions, the only physical samples to be analyzed were meteorites ejected from Mars, and impacting on Earth.

=== Debunked evidence for life on Mars ===
Carbonate found in EETA 79001 was used as a crucial piece of evidence for potential early life on Mars. It was argued that the most likely formation of the carbonate was in liquid water by biogenic means. Today, scientists believe that the carbonate was likely formed through chemical means, and is likely not related to any life that may or may not have been on Mars.

== See also ==
- Geology of Mars
- Carbonates on Mars
