= Northwest Africa 11789 =

Meteorite found in Mauritania

- Class: Lunar meteorite
- Parent body: Moon
- Composition: feldspathic breccia
- Shock stage: S5 / S6
- Weathering grade: W2
- Country: Mauritania
- Observed fall: No
- Fall date: a few thousand years ago
- Found date: 2017
- TKW: 5.492 kg (12.11 lb)
- Alternative names: Buagaba, The Moon Puzzle

NWA 11789 (also Buagaba) is a lunar meteorite that was found in the country of Mauritania. It has been broken into six fragments, which can be reassembled like a puzzle. For this reason, the meteorite is also known as The Moon Puzzle.

== Description ==
The six black pieces of the meteorite fit together to form a larger meteorite, weighing 5.5 kg (12 lb). The largest fragment weighs over 2 kg (4.4 lb), and the smallest weighs about 45 g (1.6 oz). The larger pieces show a black-brown partial fusion crust, caused by the heat generated as the meteorite descended through Earth's atmosphere. The large pieces also show thumb printing. Internally, the breccia is fragmented, with white clasts of feldspar set in a black ground mass.

== Ownership ==
From 2017–2018, the meteorite was held by meteorite curator Dustin Dickens, who purchased it from an anonymous meteorite hunter in Mauritania.

An auction was held by Boston-based RR Auction in October 2018, with the opening bid at $50,000. The auction closed on 19 October, with the winning bid of $612,500 awarded to Tam Chúc Pagoda complex, of Vietnam.

== See also ==
- List of lunar meteorites
- List of Martian meteorites
- Moon rocks
