= Lunar meteorite =

Meteorite that originated from the Moon

Lunar meteorite (Lunaite)
- — Clan —
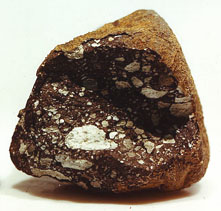
- Lunar meteorite Allan Hills 81005
- Type: Achondrite
- Subgroups: Highland breccia; Mare basalt
- Parent body: Moon
- Total known specimens: 306
- Alternative names: Lunaite

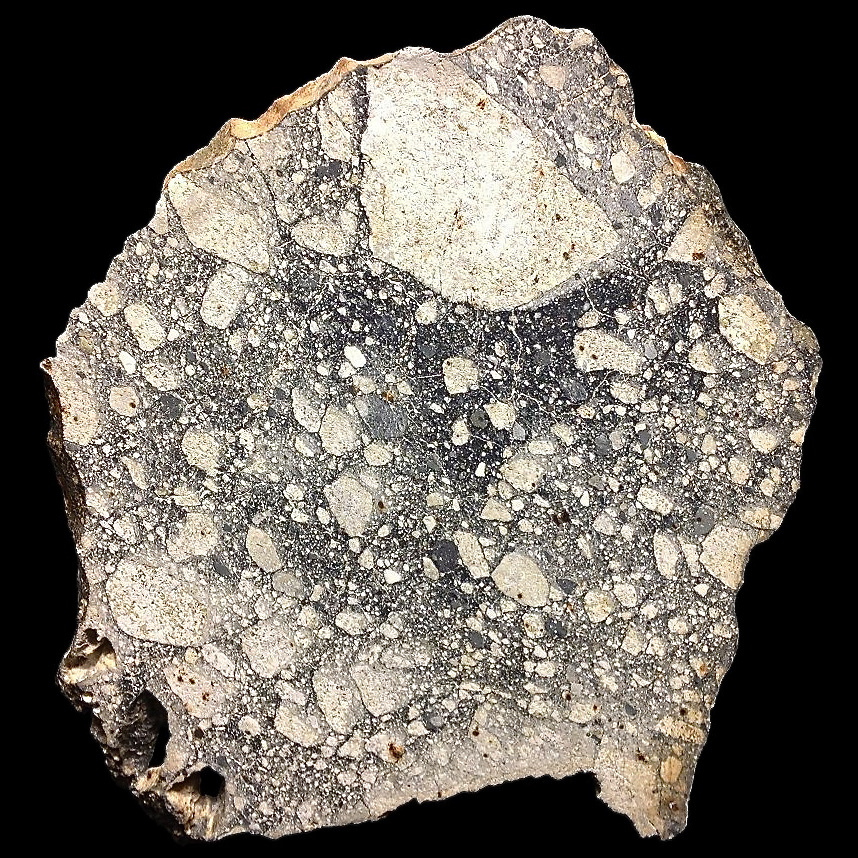
Large slice of NWA5000, the largest known lunar meteorite. It was found in the Sahara desert in 2007.

A lunar meteorite is a meteorite that is known to have originated on the Moon. A meteorite hitting the Moon is normally classified as a transient lunar phenomenon.

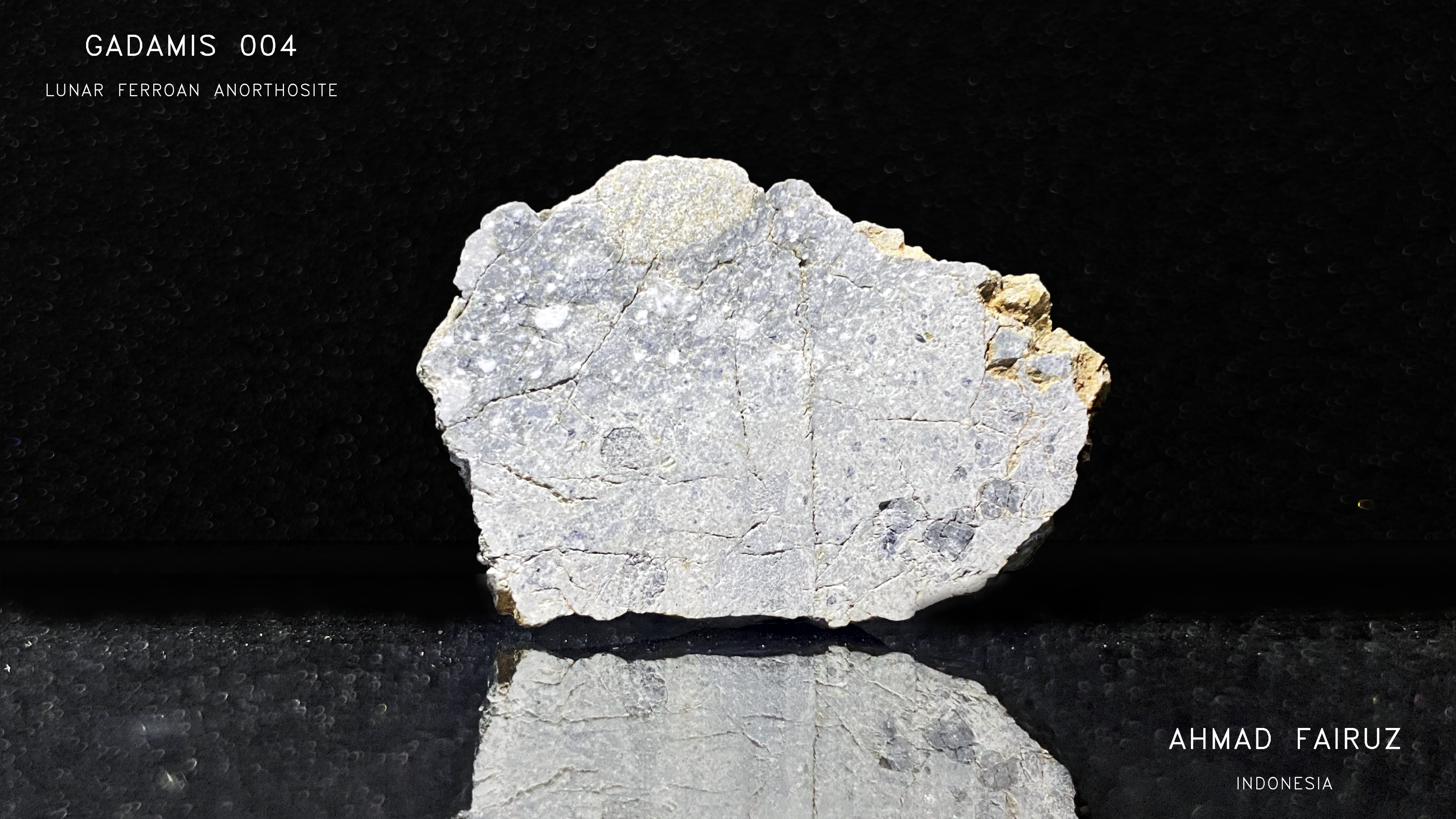
Gadamis 004, a Lunar Ferroan Anorthosite also known as the "Apollo Lunar" because their similarities both visually and compositionally and identical with Moon sample brought back by Apollo 16 mission.

== Discovery ==
In January 1982, John Schutt, leading an expedition in Antarctica for the ANSMET program, found a meteorite that he recognized to be unusual. Shortly thereafter, the meteorite now called Allan Hills 81005 was sent to Washington, DC, where Smithsonian Institution geochemist Brian Mason recognized that the sample was unlike any other known meteorite and resembled some rocks brought back from the Moon by the Apollo program. Several years later, Japanese scientists recognized that they had also collected a lunar meteorite, Yamato 791197, during the 1979 field season in Antarctica. As of July 2019, 371 lunar meteorites have been discovered, perhaps representing more than 30 separate meteorite falls (i.e., a number of the stones are "paired" fragments of the same meteoroid). The total mass is more than 1,090 kilograms (2,400 lb). All lunar meteorites have been found in deserts; most have been found in Antarctica, northern Africa, and the Sultanate of Oman. None have yet been found in North America, South America, or Europe.

Lunar origin is established by comparing the mineralogy, the chemical composition, and the isotopic composition between meteorites and samples from the Moon collected by Apollo missions.

== Transfer to Earth ==
Most lunar meteorites are launched from the Moon by impacts making lunar craters of a few kilometers in diameter or less. No source crater of lunar meteorites has been positively identified, although there is speculation that the highly anomalous lunar meteorite Sayh al Uhaymir 169 derives from the Lalande impact crater on the lunar nearside.

Cosmic-ray exposure history established with noble-gas measurements have shown that all lunar meteorites were ejected from the Moon in the past 20 million years. Most left the Moon in the past 100,000 years. After leaving the Moon, most lunar meteoroids go into orbit around Earth and eventually succumb to Earth's gravity. Some meteoroids ejected from the Moon get launched into orbits around the Sun. These meteoroids remain in space longer, but eventually intersect the Earth's orbit and land.

== Scientific relevance ==
All six of the Apollo missions on which samples were collected landed in the central nearside of the Moon, an area that has subsequently been shown to be geochemically anomalous by the Lunar Prospector mission. In contrast, the multiple lunar meteorites are random samples of the Moon and consequently provide a more representative sampling of the lunar surface than the Apollo samples. Half the lunar meteorites, for example, likely sample material from the farside of the Moon.

At the time the first meteorite from the Moon was discovered in 1982, there was speculation that some other unusual meteorites that had been found originated from Mars. The positive identification of lunar meteorites on Earth supported the hypothesis that meteoroid impacts on Mars could eject rocks from that planet. There are also speculations about the possibility of finding "Earth meteorites" on the surface of the Moon. In this case stones from Earth older than 3.9 billion years, which are destroyed on Earth by various geological processes, may have survived on the Moon. Thus some scientists propose new missions to the Moon to search for ancient rocks from Earth.

== Observation history ==
About one in every thousand newly discovered meteorites is a lunar meteorite, whereas the vast majority of meteorites are from the asteroid belt. In the early 19th century most scientists believed that all meteorites falling towards the Earth were from the Moon. Although today supported only by a minority of researchers, there are also theories that tektites are from the Moon and should therefore also be regarded as lunar meteorites. However, most scientists regard such theories as outdated.

== Private ownership ==
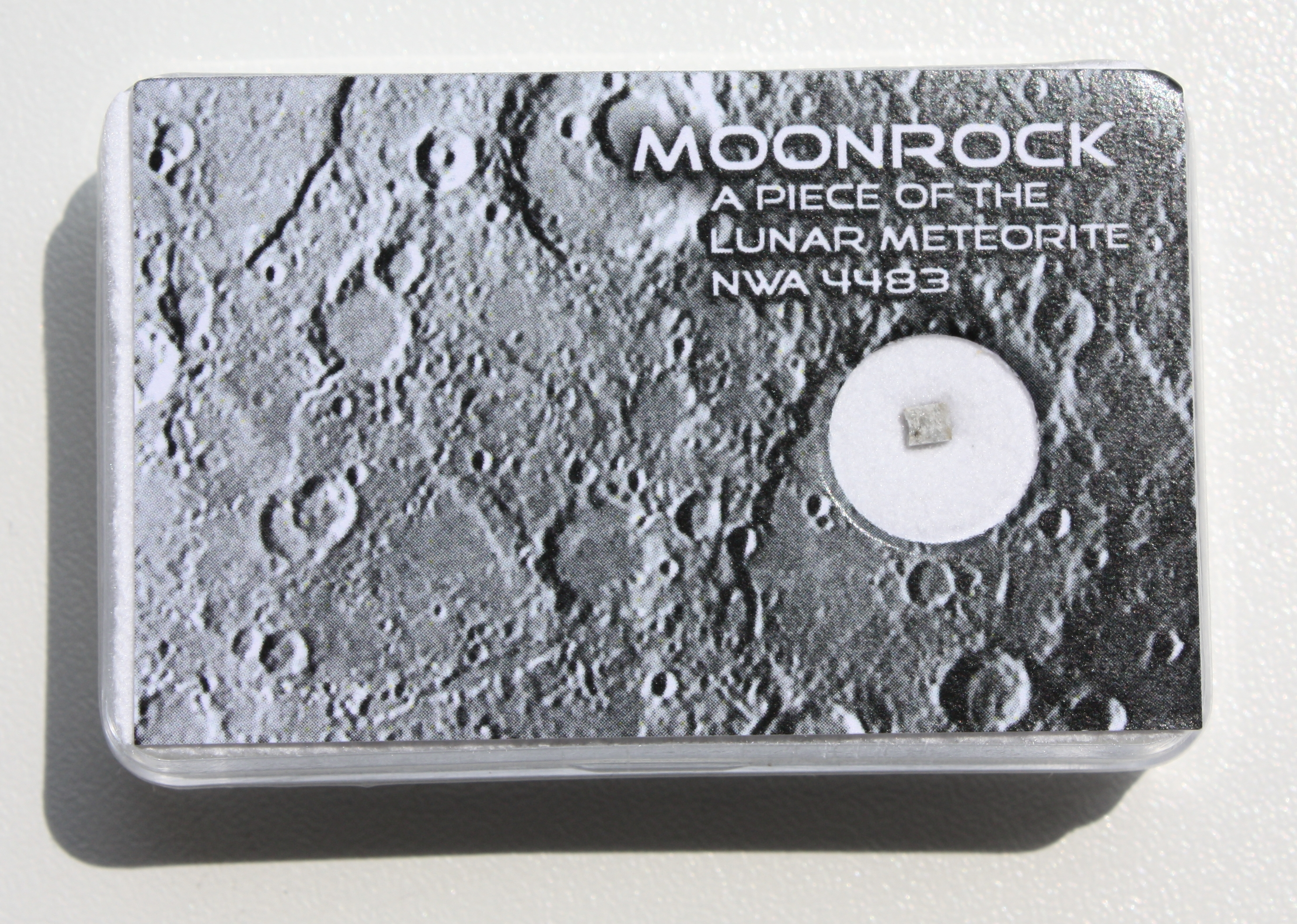
A privately owned 11 milligrams (0.17 gr) (2.2 by 2.0 millimetres (0.087 in × 0.079 in)) piece of the lunar meteorite NWA 4483

Lunar meteorites collected in Africa and Oman are, for all practical purposes, the only source of Moon rocks available for private ownership. This is because all rocks collected during the Apollo Moon-landing program are property of the United States government or of other nations to which the U.S. conveyed them as gifts. Similarly, all lunar meteorites collected by the U.S. and Japanese Antarctic programs are, by treaty, held by those governments for research and education purposes only. Although there is no U.S. law specifically against the ownership of Apollo Moon rocks, none has ever been (or is likely to ever be) given or sold by the U.S. government to private citizens. Even in the cases of plaques containing genuine Apollo Moon rocks given in 2004 to astronauts and Walter Cronkite, NASA retained ownership of the rocks themselves. Most of the moonrocks collected by the Luna 16 probe are also unavailable for private ownership, although three tiny samples were sold at auction for $442,500 in 1993.

== See also ==
- Glossary of meteoritics
- Geology of the Moon
- List of lunar meteorites
- List of meteorites on Mars
- Martian meteorite
- Moon rocks
