= Yamato 791197 =

First known lunar meteorite found on Earth

- Type: Achondrite
- Class: Lunar meteorite
- Group: Anorthositic
- Parent body: Moon
- Country: Antarctica
- Coordinates: 71°30′S 35°40′E
- Observed fall: No
- Fall date: 0.03–0.09 Myr
- Found date: November 20, 1979
- TKW: 52.4 g

Yamato 791197, official abbreviation Y-791197, is a meteorite that was found in Antarctica on November 20, 1979.

It is the first lunar meteorite to be found on Earth, but was not identified as such until 1984, after the lunar origin of ALH 81005 was recognised. It was collected by the National Institute of Polar Research, Japan.

== Classification and characteristics ==
Weighing 52.4 grams, it is a weakly shocked feldspathic regolith breccia believed to have come from the lunar highlands on the far side of the Moon.

It is classified as lunar-anorthositic breccia, a lunar meteorite that is primarily anorthositic.

== See also ==
- Glossary of meteoritics
- List of lunar meteorites
