= Charles Neider =

American writer (1915–2001)

- Born: January 18, 1915; Odessa, Kerson Governorate, Russian Empire (now Ukraine)
- Died: July 4, 2001 (aged 86); Princeton, New Jersey, US
- Occupation: Author

Charles Neider (January 18, 1915 in Odessa, Kherson Governorate, Russian Empire – July 4, 2001, in Princeton, New Jersey) was an American writer, known for editing the Autobiography of Mark Twain and authoring literary impressions of Antarctica.

== Movie ==
His 1956 novel, The Authentic Death of Hendry Jones, was freely adapted into the movie One-Eyed Jacks (1961) starring and directed by Marlon Brando.

== Antarctica ==
Between 1969 and 1977, he participated in three expeditions to Antarctica funded by the National Science Foundation and the United States Navy.

He wrote about these trips in "Edge of the World: Ross Island, Antarctica" (1974), dedicated to James F. Brandau and "Beyond Cape Horn: Travels in the Antarctic" (1980).

Neider's 1986 novel Overflight is based on an incident when Neider was a passenger in a helicopter crashed on Mount Erebus in 1971. The novel also concerns a plane crash with 256 passengers on board, so it is possibly a fictional combination of his 1971 experience and the 1979 Mount Erebus Disaster.

== Mark Twain scholarship ==
Neider edited a major edition of the Autobiography of Mark Twain, published in 1959. In this, he expressed regret that Twain's daughter Clara Clemens would not permit him to include Samuel Clemens' dictations from June 1906 (the 19th, 20th, 22nd, 23rd, and 25th).

Other Mark Twain Publications he edited include:

- The Complete Short Stories of Mark Twain (1957)
- The Autobiography of Mark Twain (1959)
- The Complete Humorous Sketches and Tales of Mark Twain (1961)
- Mark Twain: Life As I Find It (1961)
- The Travels of Mark Twain (1961)
- Complete Essays of Mark Twain (1963)
- The Adventures of Colonel Sellers (1965)
- The Complete Travel Books of Mark Twain (1966)
- Mark Twain (1967)
- The Comic Mark Twain Reader (1977)
- The Selected Letters of Mark Twain (1972)
- A Tramp Abroad (1977)
- Plymouth Rock and the Pilgrims and Other Salutary Platform Opinions (1984)
- Papa: An Intimate Biography of Mark Twain by Susy Clemens (1985)
- Adventures of Huckleberry Finn (1985)
- Mark Twain at His Best: A Comprehensive Sampler (1986)
- The Outrageous Mark Twain (1987).

== Awards ==
- In 1977, he received a John Simon Guggenheim fellowship.

== Personal life ==
He was married to Joan Merrick. He died on July 4, 2001, at his home in Princeton, New Jersey.
