= Sayh al Uhaymir 169 =

Lunar meteorite

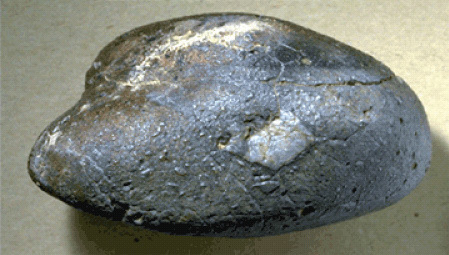
- Complete stone of SaU169 showing the fusion crust and also a large clast
- Type: Achondrite
- Class: Lunar meteorite
- Group: Impact breccia
- Composition: 45.15% SiO_{2}, 15.88% Al_{2}O_{3}, 11.09% MgO, 10.67% FeO, 10.16% CaO, 2.21% TiO_{2}, 1.14% P_{2}O_{5}, 0.98% Na_{2}O, 0.54% K_{2}O, 0.33% S, 0.14% MnO
- Country: Oman
- Region: Sayh al Uhaymir
- Coordinates: 20.5733°N 57.3234°E
- Observed fall: No
- Fall date: < 9700 years ago
- Found date: 16 January 2002
- TKW: 206.45 grams (7.282 oz)
- Alternative names: SaU 169
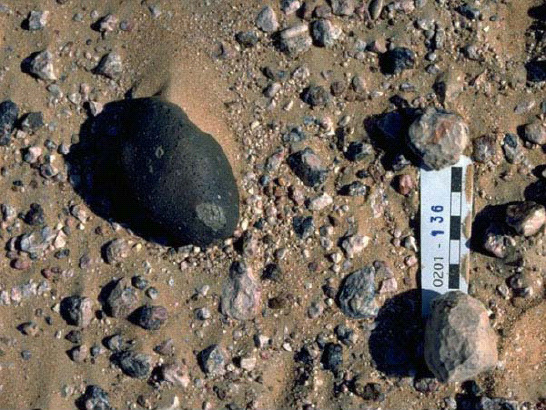
- Sayh al Uhaymir 169 as found in the Oman desert

Sayh al Uhaymir 169 (SaU 169) is a 206 gram lunar meteorite found in the Sayh al Uhaymir region of the Sultanate of Oman in January 2002.

This stone is an impact melt breccia with exceedingly high concentrations of thorium and other incompatible elements; phosphorus, rare-earth elements, and the three most important naturally occurring radioactive elements, potassium, thorium, and uranium, have been segregated in the liquid phase when the lunar minerals crystallized. The impact that eventually sent this stone to the Earth is dated at 3.9 billion years and could be the Imbrium impact. It collided with the Earth less than 9,700 years ago.

It is complete, a light gray-greenish rounded stone, dimensions 70 mm × 43 mm × 40 mm (2.8 in × 1.7 in × 1.6 in) and mass 206 grams (7.3 oz), found on January 16, 2002, in the central desert of Oman at 20° 34.391' N and 57° 19.400' E.

According to geologist Edwin Gnos and coworkers, the meteorite's origin can be pinpointed to the vicinity of the Lalande impact crater; isotopic analysis shows a complex history of four distinct lunar impacts: "Crystallization of the impact melt occurred at 3909 ± 13 Ma, followed by exhumation by a second impact at 2800 Ma, which raised the sample to a regolith position at unconstrained depth. A third impact at 200 Ma moved the material closer to the lunar surface, where it mixed with solar-wind–containing regolith. It was launched into space by a fourth impact at <0.34 Ma".

== See also ==
- Glossary of meteoritics
- List of lunar meteorites
