= Edna P. Plumstead =

South African palaeobotanist (1903–1989)

- Born: 15 September 1903; Cape Town, Cape Colony
- Died: 23 September 1989 (aged 86); Johannesburg
- Education: Witwatersrand University
- Scientific career
- Workplaces: Bernard Price Institute for Palaeontological Research, University of the Witwatersrand
- Author abbrev. (botany): Plumst.

Edna Pauline Plumstead (née Janisch; 15 September 1903 – 23 September 1989) was a South African palaeobotanist who spent much of her career at the Bernard Price Institute for Palaeontological Research at the University of the Witwatersrand in Johannesburg, where she graduated in 1924.

Plumstead's observations of fossilized plant specimens led her to become an early advocate for the theory of continental drift, beginning in the 1950s. She has been described as "one of South Africa's foremost scientists in the field of Gondwana paleobotany and geology". She was awarded the Chrestian Mica Gondwanaland Medal by the Geological Society of India, and was made a Fellow of the Royal Society of South Africa.

== Early life ==
Plumstead was born in Cape Town and lived there for the first seven years of her life, where she explored and found wildflowers on the Cape Peninsula. She graduated in 1924 from the Witwatersrand University with a B.Sc. (Hons.) in geology and took up an appointment with the Geology Department. Her dissertation for her Master's degree was highly regarded by the Geological Society of South Africa leading to her being the first recipient of the Corstorphine Medal. She joined the Bernard Price Institute in 1965 from the Geology Department. At the time she was studying plant fossils collected in Antarctica, and gradually became convinced that sedimentary rocks of the same age in Antarctica, South Africa, South America, India and Australia contained essentially identical plant fossils. These species were dated from the late Palaeozoic onwards.

Although this was long before general acceptance of the ideas of continental drift, plate tectonics and sea-floor spreading, some saw the Antarctic fossil plants as compelling evidence for the existence of the former supercontinent of Gondwana. Five years after the palaeobotanical evidence was announced to the world, James Kitching added the evidence of vertebrate fossils to the debate when he joined the United States Antarctic Research Group on a visit in 1970 and collected vertebrate fossils identical to those he was accustomed to finding in the Karoo.

== Career ==
Plumstead lived in South Africa, a country where Alfred Wegener’s theory of continental drift was valid and widely taught in schools, which was different from North America and Europe where the theory had been rejected by mainstream science. She was influenced by Wegener’s hypothesis and became especially interested in the fact that early life on Earth was not evenly distributed, but that it was still divided into zones. She also learned of speculation about an ancient continent called Gondwanaland and decided to study more about it. She made her most significant discovery in 1952, which was the fructification of Glossopteris, an ubiquitous Permian plant of Gondwana. She was the first to describe the strange fertile structures of Glossopteris located on the mid-rib of its leaves.

During her investigations, she compared the floras of the Southern and Northern Hemispheres, and with it she observed that some countries, including Africa, South America, India, Australia and Antarctica had had similar floras in the past. Her observation was important because it provided evidence supporting the existence of Gondwana. She later published her ideas in her book The Case for Continental Drift.

For her investigation there were two important questions that she asked and tried to resolve. The first one was: “If the position of the continents had not changed how could the same genera and even species of plants have migrated east, west and south across the wide oceans which now separate them, but have failed to reach North America, Europe and Asia along easy routes?” The second question was: “If the climatic zones were the same, how can we explain the fact that the fossil plants of peninsular India are closely comparable, and often identical with those of Australia, Africa south of the Sahara, Argentina and Brazil but above all, with those found in the heart of Antarctica at 86˚S where today no vascular plant could live?”

Plumstead also played a role in the development of mobilism theory as she provided better information about Glossopteris that contributed to the interpretation and understanding of the division of Gondwana. She became an authentic voice for mobilism. Her work, together with that of Wegener, Alexander du Toit and Martin helped Warren B. Hamilton, a supporter of the continental drift theory, to develop his theory on mobilism which he then applied in America.

In her review of "Paleobotany in Antarctica", she came to the conclusion that it is inevitable that evidence from Antarctica demands a more plausible phytogeographical explanation than any that was given before, and seems to be satisfied by the acceptance of some form of continental drift. As a paleobotanist as well, she studied fossils and was especially interested in how fossils of the same species ended up on different continents, and used Gondwana to explain this. Her papers on continental drift were widely discussed and important for her own development in her research of fossils. Plumstead made a great contribution to the understanding of Glossopteris, providing key evidence confirming the mobilist interpretation of Gondwana. Through much of Plumstead's work, other scientists have been able to confirm their own theories which have helped us to know about the world as it is today.

== Partial list of publications ==
- E. P. Plumstead, "Description of two new genera and six new species of fructifications borne on Glossopteris leaves from South Africa". Trans Geol Soc S Afr, 55 (1952), 281–328.
- E. P. Plumstead, "Bisexual fructifications borne on Glossopteris leaves from South Africa". Palaeontographica, 100B (1956),1–25.
- Edna P. Plumstead, "Bisexual fructification borne on Glossopteris leaves from South Africa" Stuttgart, E. Schweizerbart, 1956.
- Edna P. Plumstead, "Coal in Southern Africa". Johannesburg: Witwatersrand University Press. (1957).
- Edna P. Plumstead, "On Ottokaria, the fructification of Gangamopteris". Johannesburg: Hortors Ltd., [1957?]
- E. P. Plumstead, "Further fructifications of the Glossopteridae and a provisional classification based on them". Trans Geol Soc S Afr, 61 (1958), 52–74.
- Edna P. Plumstead and R Kraűsel. "Fossil floras of Antarctica". London: Trans-Antarctic Expedition Committee (1962).
- Edna P. Plumstead, "Three Thousand Million Years of Plant Life in Africa". Johannesburg: Geological Society of South Africa, (1969).
- Edna P. Plumstead, "Plenary paper on Gondwana paleobotany". (1970).
- Edna P. Plumstead, "A new assemblage of plant fossils from Milorgfjella, Dronning Maud Land". Cambridge: British Antarctic Survey, (1975).

Books by Plumstead:

- Fossil Floras of Antarctica. One edition published in English in 1962.
- Section Drawing of Simple Geological Maps. Eight editions published in English between 1938 and 1946.
- Geology. One edition published in English in 1962.
