= William A. Cassidy =

American geologist and professor (1928–2020)

William A. Cassidy (3 January 1928 – 22 March 2020) was an American geologist and professor emeritus of Geology and Planetary Science at the University of Pittsburgh. Cassidy was responsible for recognizing that Antarctica represented the greatest repository of meteorites on earth. Starting in the early 1970s, Cassidy led most major meteorite expeditions to the south polar region, and in 1979, he was awarded the Antarctica Service Medal.

Bill Cassidy founded and led ANSMET from 1976 to 1993. The Cassidy Glacier in Antarctica is named for him, the mineral Cassidyite, and the asteroid 3382 Cassidy.

Cassidy assisted the NTSB with the investigation into TWA flight 800. Cassidy estimated that a meteor strike that could damage an aircraft would occur over the US only once every 59,000 to 77,000 years.

== Selected publications ==
- Meteorites, Ice, and Antarctica: A Personal Account (2003, Cambridge University Press, ISBN 978-0521258722)

== See also ==
- Allan Hills
