= ANSMET =

Program funded by the National Science Foundation

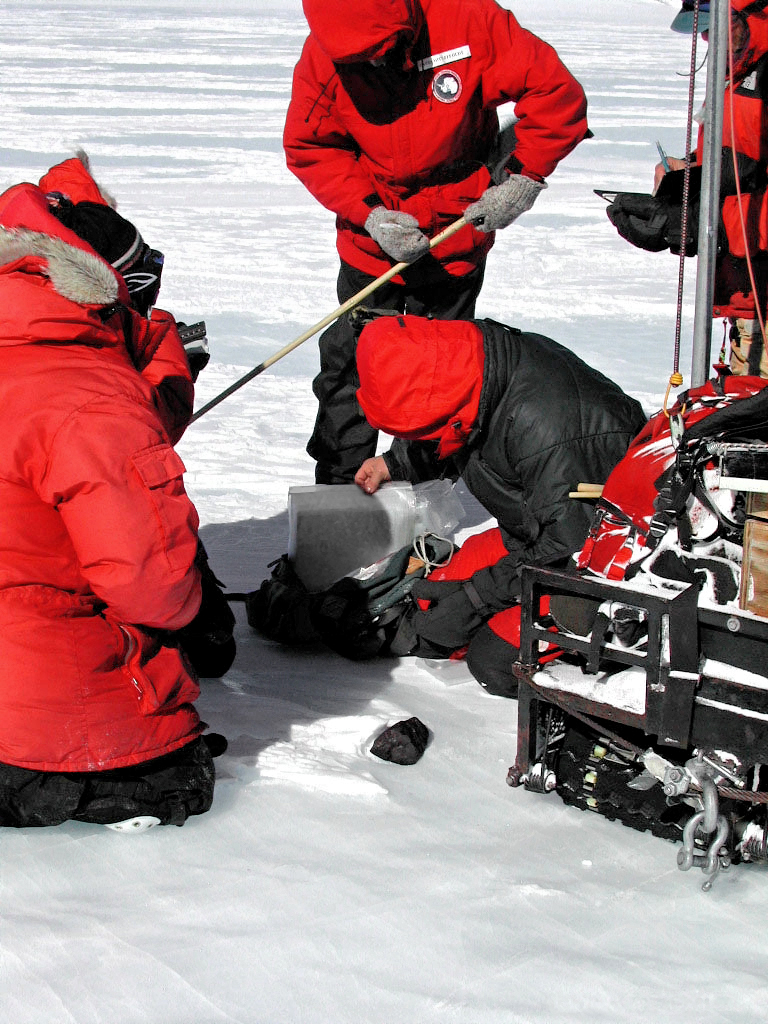
- Recovery of a meteorite in Antarctica

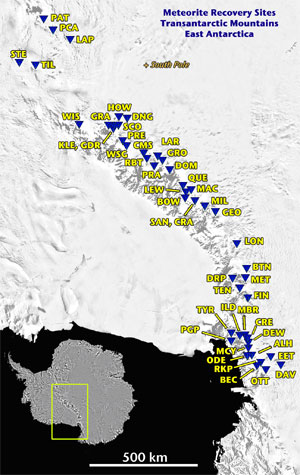
- Location of meteorites collected across the Transantarctic Mountains
- Purpose: Find meteorites in Antarctica
- Location(s): Department of Earth, Environmental and Planetary Sciences at Case Western Reserve University
- Parent organization: Office of Polar Programs of the National Science Foundation
- Website: caslabs.case.edu/ansmet/

ANSMET (Antarctic Search for Meteorites) is a program funded by the Office of Polar Programs of the National Science Foundation that looks for meteorites in the Transantarctic Mountains. This geographical area serves as a collection point for meteorites that have originally fallen on the extensive high-altitude ice fields throughout Antarctica. Such meteorites are quickly covered by subsequent snowfall and begin a centuries-long journey traveling "downhill" across the Antarctic continent while embedded in a vast sheet of flowing ice. Portions of such flowing ice can be halted by natural barriers such as the Transantarctic Mountains. Subsequent wind erosion of the motionless ice brings trapped meteorites back to the surface once more where they may be collected. This process concentrates meteorites in a few specific areas to much higher concentrations than they are normally found everywhere else. The contrast of the dark meteorites against the white snow, and lack of terrestrial rocks on the ice, makes such meteorites relatively easy to find. However, the vast majority of such ice-embedded meteorites eventually slide undiscovered into the ocean.

== History ==
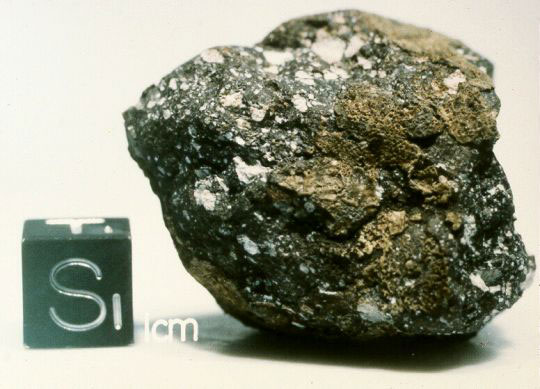
Meteorite next to a 1 cm sided cube. Found by ANSMET in the 1981-82 season. A Lunar meteorite

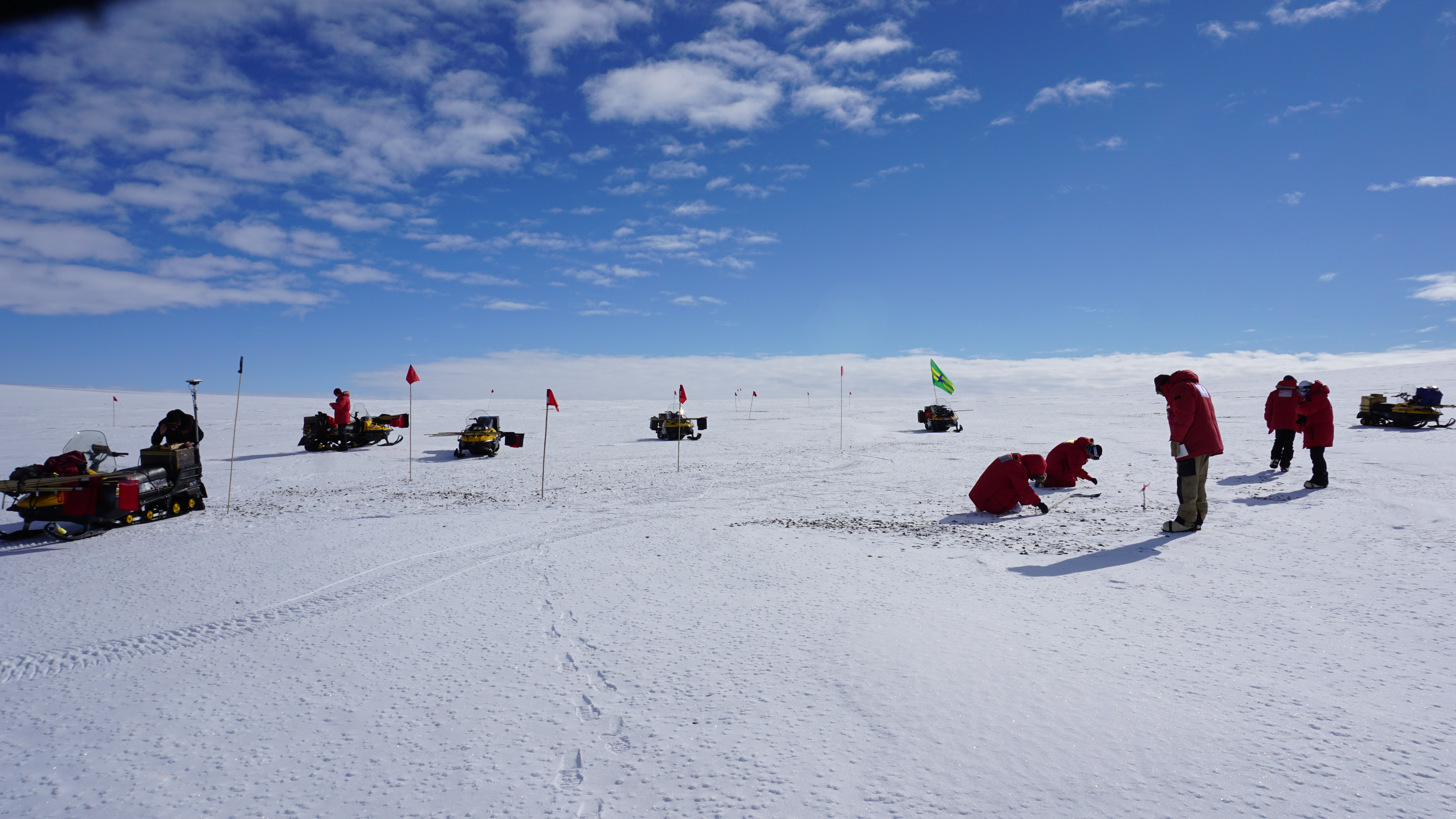
Searching for meteors, 2015

The first Antarctic meteorite was discovered during the 1911–1914 Douglas Mawson Australasian Antarctic Expedition. Subsequent discoveries of three more were made in 1961 and 1964 by Russian geologists near Novolazarevskaya Station, and USGS geologists in the Thiel and Neptune Mountains. In 1969, Japanese explorers discovered nine meteorites at the Yamato Mountains, and 12 more during the 1973–1974 season, 663 during the 1974–1975 season, and 307 during the 1975–1976 season. Based on that success, William A. Cassidy received funding for ANSMET to commence in the 1976–1977 season. Cassidy was the Principal Investigator for the 1976–1977 season, and subsequent seasons up to and including the 1993–1994 season.

== Importance ==
The ANSMET program, together with parallel Antarctic collection programs run by Japan, China, and other nations, is a major source of the extraterrestrial material that is available for scientific investigation. All of the material collected by ANSMET is curated for the purpose of research and public education, in contrast to meteorites collected privately, the bulk of which are frequently sold to collectors.

As of 2003, ANSMET had collected 8409 chondrites and 234 achondrites, in addition to a Lunar meteorite ALH 81005, and the Martian meteorites EETA 79001, ALH77005 and ALH84001.

== Method ==
The search for the meteorites is done visually. A team of four to ten explorers, typically meteorite scientists, lives for 5–7 weeks on the ice field. Using snowmobiles spaced 30 m apart they scan the blue ice for meteorites. Once a specimen has been located its position is found using GPS and it is given an identification number. It is then placed in a sterile Teflon bag. The teams make sure that the specimen remains frozen throughout its journey back to the Antarctic Meteorite Curation Facility at the Johnson Space Center in Houston, Texas. Since 1976, ANSMET has returned over 20,000 meteorites. Meteorites of greater interest and undergoing detailed study are kept at JSC for distribution to the scientific community, though, ultimately, all samples collected by ANSMET are transferred to the Smithsonian Institution for permanent storage and curation. These meteorites are housed at the Smithsonian Museum Support Center clean room facility at Suitland, Maryland, which is modeled after the Lunar Processing Laboratory at NASA’s Lyndon B. Johnson Space Center in Houston, Texas. Of the almost 16,000 Antarctic meteorites collected since 1976, over 14,000 have been permanently transferred to the Smithsonian. Curators at the Department of Mineral Sciences at the National Museum of Natural History classify each representative chip of meteorite sent by NASA. Results and descriptions are published in the Antarctic Meteorite Newsletter, issued twice a year.

The naming convention for Antarctic meteorites collected by ANSMET is as follows: a three letter prefix based on the location the meteorite is found, followed by two numbers that designate the year of collection, and a three number unique identifier. For example, ALH84001 was collected in the Allan Hills region in 1984.

The 2004–2005 ANSMET expedition consisted of 12 members and collectively they returned 1,230 meteorites. These included over 130 kilograms (290 lb) of pallasite meteorites, one of which is the largest yet found in Antarctica at over 30 kilograms (66 lb).

The 2006–2007 ANSMET expedition consisted of a 9-member systematic team (including astronaut Don Pettit) that explored the Grosvenor Mountains and a 4-member reconnaissance team that explored Scott Glacier and Reedy Glacier as possible destinations for future expeditions.

The 2009–2010 ANSMET expedition consisted of 8 members that returned 1010 meteorites.

The 2010–2011 ANSMET expedition consisted of a 9-member systematic team and a 4-member reconnaissance team (including astronaut Serena Aunon-Chancellor) that explored new areas where future teams may go. Collectively they returned over 1200 meteorites.

The 2011–2012 ANSMET expedition returned to the Miller Range. Despite being hampered by heavy snow, the team collected 302 meteorites, which was just enough to bring the total number of meteorites collected by ANSMET over the 20,000 milestone.

== See also ==
- Glossary of meteoritics
- The Thing (1982 film)
- McMurdo Station
