= Carapace Nunatak =

Nunatak in Antarctica

Carapace Nunatak (76°53′S 159°24′E) is a prominent isolated nunatak, the most westerly near the head of Mackay Glacier in Victoria Land, standing 8 nautical miles (15 km) southwest of Mount Brooke where it is visible for a considerable distance from many directions. It was so named by the New Zealand party of the Commonwealth Trans-Antarctic Expedition (1956–1958) because of the fossil carapaces of small crustaceans found in the exposed rocks.

== Geology ==
The Carapace Nunatak is an erosional outlier of Jurassic strata, which consists of about 430 m (1,410 ft) of the Ferrar Group. The exact thickness is unknown because the strata is broken up by faults and discontinuous glacial moraines conceal the underlying Jurassic strata.

At the base of Carapace Nunatak, about 130 m (430 ft) of cross-bedded sandstones and fine lithic conglomerates of the Carapace Sandstone outcrops. The gravel fraction of the fine conglomerates consists of pebbles of coal, granite, greywacke, and weathered basalt. Some beds contain volcanic debris. The uppermost 25 m (82 ft) contains beds of laminated and fossiliferous beds of mudstone, siltstone, and chert. The base of the Carapace Sandstone is not exposed. The Carapace Nunatak is the type locality for the Carapace Sandstone.

Conformably overlying the Carapace Sandstone is 300 m (980 ft) of Kirkpatrick Basalt. The basalt lava flows include a thick layer of hyaloclastite breccia with beds of pillow lava at its base. About 140 m (460 ft) above its base, a 15 m (49 ft) thick layer of volcanic breccia lies sandwiched between basaltic lava flows. The lava flows exhibit columnar jointing and, at the base of the Kirkpatrick Basalt, contain with very large (up to 2 m (6.6 ft) thick) xenoliths (rafts) of fossiliferous, laminated siltstone and chert. The upper surface of the Kirkpatrick Basalt has been long since removed by erosion.

== Fossils ==
The fossiliferous horizons of the Ferrar Group at Carapace Nunatak contain one of the richest and most diverse freshwater Jurassic paleobiota known from Antarctica. Not only are these fossils diverse, except for poorly preserved petrified wood, the fossils found at Carapace Nunatak are remarkably well preserved to the extent that their source is referred to as a Lagerstätten.

In the laminated, and silicified, fine-grained lake deposits of Carapace Sandstone, fossil conchostracans (clam shrimp) are the most important in terms of number of individuals and distribution. They consist of small, 1 to 2 cm (0.39 to 0.79 in), bivalved spinicaudatan arthropods. They are most typical of ephemeral, alkaline ponds. Associated macrofossils include notostracan branchiopods, ostracodes, insect nymphs and wings, and plant leaves. Macroscopic trace fossils are extremely rare.

The lake cherts from the upper part of Carapace Sandstone contain an abundance of fusainized plant material and animal remains. This fine-grained Magadi-type chert preserves abundant plant fossils. These plant fossils include at least three conifer taxa represented by vegetative and reproductive structures, isolated ovules, a diversity of taxa of fern pinnules, rachides and rhizomes, and cycadophyte foliage. Intermixed with the plant fossils are numerous of shallow-water conchostracans and other ephemeral freshwater crustaceans.
