= Lalande (crater) =

Crater on the Moon

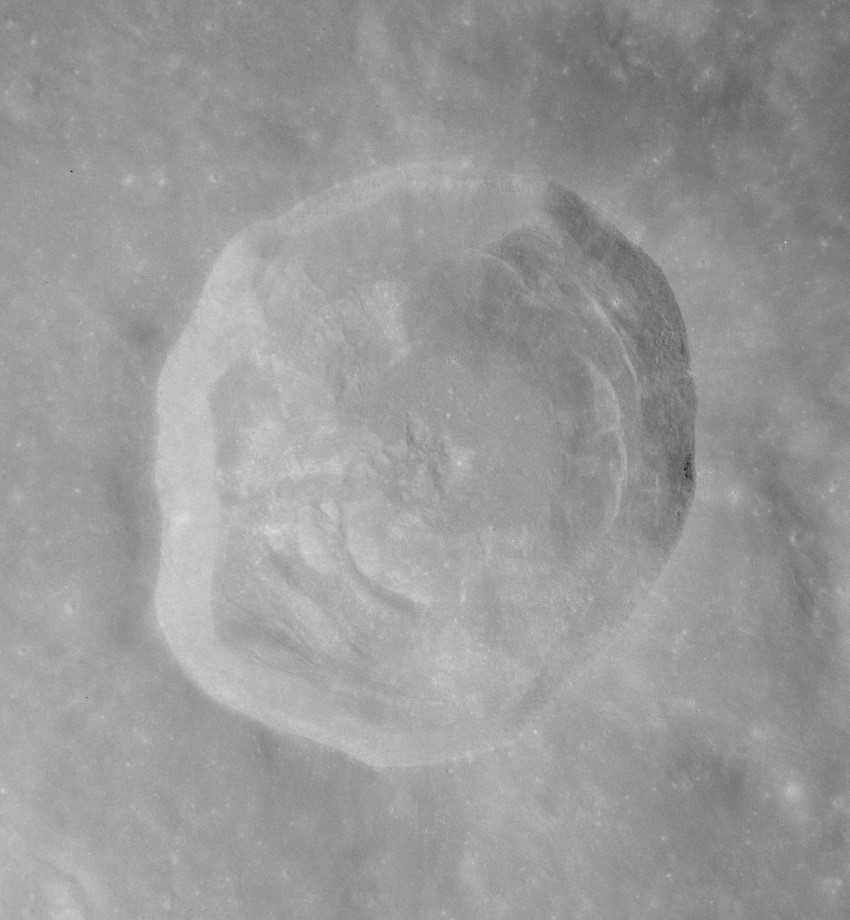
- Apollo 12 image
- Coordinates: 4.4°S 8.6°W
- Diameter: 24 km
- Depth: 1.74 km
- Colongitude: 9° at sunrise
- Eponym: Jérôme Lalande

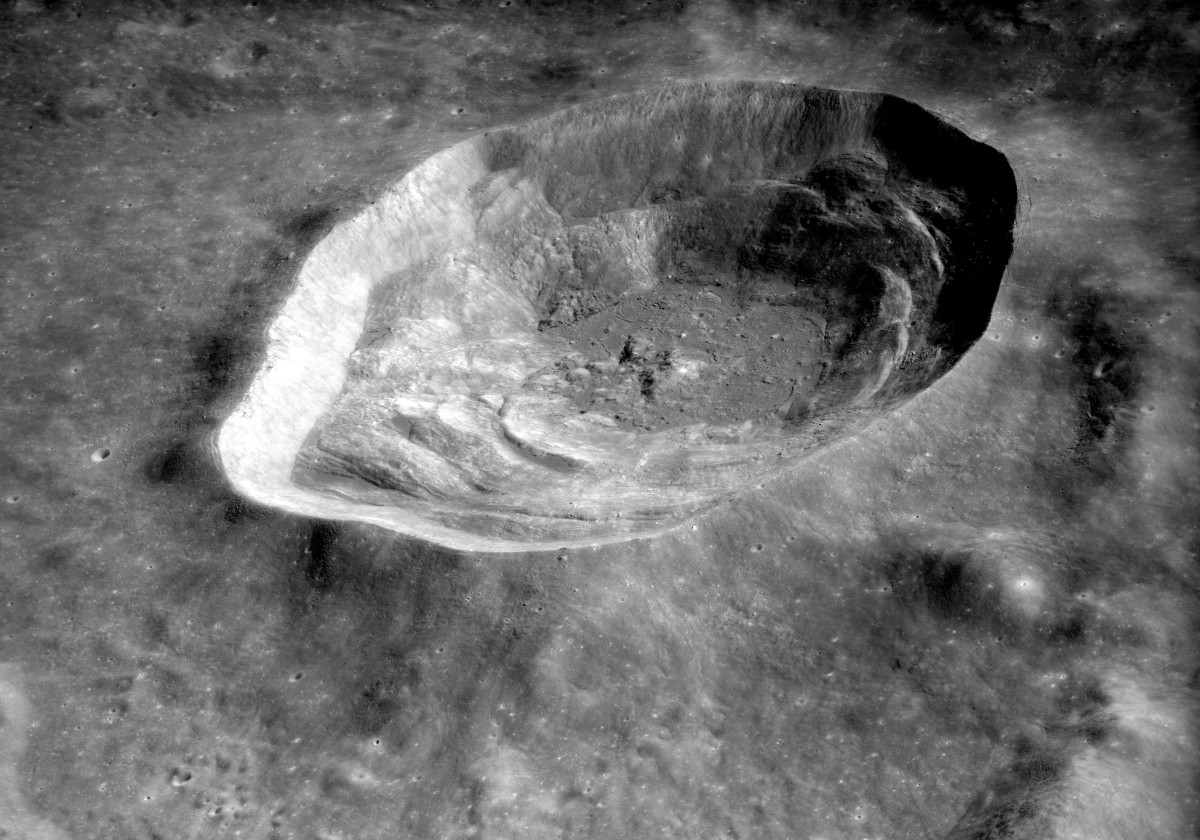
Oblique view of Lalande from Apollo 16, facing north

Lalande is a small lunar impact crater that lies in the central part of the visible Moon, on the eastern edge of Mare Insularum. It was named after French astronomer Jérôme Lalande. The crater is surrounded by a high-albedo area of ejecta that extends into a ray system with a maximum radius of over 300 kilometers. The interior wall has a terrace system, and there is a small central rise at the midpoint of the floor. It was formed during the Copernican period of the moon extending from 1.1 billion years ago to the present. Its young age is indicated by the bright rays of ejecta surrounding the crater, its sharp features, and the relative lack of later impacts in its interior. The rays of ejecta from Lalande overlay the ejecta rays from Copernicus Crater, meaning it is younger than Copernicus, and thus no more than 800 million years old.

In 2002, a meteorite was discovered in the Oman desert by Edwin Gnos of the University of Berne. This rock, identified as Sayh al Uhaymir 169, is believed to have originated from the Moon. It was ejected from the surface during an impact that occurred less than 340,000 years in the past. Scientists now think that the rock originated from the crater ejecta blanket surrounding Lalande.

== Lalande A and Lalande C during full moon ==
Bowl-shaped satellite craters Lalande A and Lalande C, southwest and southeast of Lalande itself, are easy to find during full moon. Both craters show bright inner slopes and dark floors, which gives them the appearance of a pair of staring eyes. Both of them are also noticeable on the photographic version of chart LAC 77 (page 154) in The Clementine Atlas of the Moon (Ben Bussey / Paul D. Spudis).

== Satellite craters ==
By convention these features are identified on lunar maps by placing the letter on the side of the crater midpoint that is closest to Lalande.

Lalande	Latitude	Longitude	Diameter
A	6.6° S	9.8° W	13 km
B	3.1° S	9.0° W	8 km
C	5.6° S	6.9° W	11 km
D	6.1° S	7.5° W	8 km
E	3.4° S	10.7° W	4 km
F	2.6° S	10.0° W	3 km
G	6.2° S	7.9° W	5 km
N	5.6° S	5.7° W	6 km
R	4.7° S	7.0° W	24 km
T	5.2° S	7.5° W	4 km
U	3.2° S	8.1° W	4 km
W	6.5° S	5.6° W	11 km
