= Brandau (surname) =

Brandau is a surname. Notable people with the surname include:

- Art Brandau (1922–2001), American football player
- Butch Brandau (1899–1987), American football player
- Elisabeth Brandau (born 1985), German cyclist
- James F. Brandau (1933–2012), American helicopter pilot
- Matilde Brandau (c. 1870–1948), Chilean lawyer and educator
