= Allan Hills A81005 =

First lunar meteorite discovered on Earth

Allan Hills A81005 (ALH A81005)
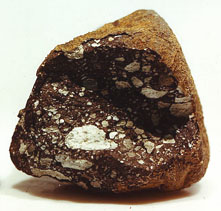
- Type: Achondrite
- Clan: Lunar meteorite
- Group: Lunar anorthosite
- Parent body: Moon
- Composition: Breccia with plagioclase clasts.
- Weathering grade: A/B
- Country: Antarctica
- Region: Allan Hills
- Coordinates: 76°49′49″S 158°15′32″E
- Observed fall: No
- Found date: 17 January 1982
- TKW: 31.4 grams (1.11 oz)

Allan Hills A81005 or ALH A81005 (sometimes also named without the "A" in front of the number) was the first meteorite to be recognised as a lunar meteorite. The meteorite Yamato 791197 was discovered in 1979 but its lunar origin was not recognised until 1984. ALH A81005 was found in 1982 in the Allan Hills at the end of the Transantarctic Mountains, during a meteorite gathering expedition (ANSMET).

== Discovery and naming ==
ALH A81005 was found on 17 January 1982 by John Schutt and Ian Whillans. It is named after the Allan Hills, a mountain chain in Antarctica where many meteorites are gathered by expeditions. The large number of meteorites collected in Antarctica and the lack of geographic terms that could be used for names have led to the adaption of the "Antarctic rules" for meteorite naming. Every meteorite found in Antarctica receives the names of the collection area (Allan Hills) and a number. The number consists of the year the expedition started "81" and a three digit number that is given out consecutively (005). The "A" in front of the number stands for meteorites collected by ANSMET expeditions and can be considered optional. The definition of the year is used because the year changes during the Austral summer season (December to March) and this avoids samples from one expedition having different years. This is the reason ALH A81005 has the year "81" in its name despite being found on 17 January 1982.

== Description ==
ALH A81005 measures 3 × 2.5 × 3 centimetres (1.18 × 0.98 × 1.18 in). It has a dark fusion crust on the outside. The interior is made up of a black to dark grey groundmass (matrix) with larger grey and white angular crystals (clasts). This appearance is typical for breccias, including those originating on Earth. The size of the larger crystals ranges from sub-millimeter to 8 millimetres (0.31 in) in diameter.

Thin section analysis revealed that the crystals are mostly plagioclase, with some pyroxene and olivine. It was also discovered that the meteorite had similarities to terrestrial gabbro or basalt. Microprobe analysis showed that the plagioclase was very calcium-rich. The crystals are a solid solution of 97% anorthite and 3% albite. The pyroxenes have a variable composition lying between enstatite, ferrosilite and wollastonite. The olivine is a solid solution of 11 to 40% fayalite with the rest being forsterite. ALH A81005 is classified as a "lunar anorthosite breccia" and belongs to the group "lunar anorthosite" (abbreviated Lun-A).

== History ==
The determination that ALH A81005 was of lunar origin was made by Robert Clayton and Toshiko Mayeda, researchers at the University of Chicago, following the determination by Smithsonian Institution scientist Brian Harold Mason that the meteorite was similar in chemical and isotopic composition to rocks returned by the Apollo program astronauts from lunar highland areas. Evidence that ALHA 81005 is a lunar sample, was presented at the 18 March 1983 meeting of the Lunar and Planetary Institute. The evidence included fabric data, mineralogical data, compositional data, oxygen isotope data, noble gas data, cosmic ray exposure history, magnetic properties, nuclear particle tracks, and thermoluminescence data.

An analysis conducted by co-relating data from the Chandrayaan-3 rover Pragyan's APXS instrument aided scientists from PRL to conduct a comprehensive geochemical study of the lunar surface in 2026. It was discovered from these findings that the composition of the ALHA 81005 meteorite discovered in the Allan Hills region of Antarctica and the first meteor suspected to be of lunar origin to have closely matched those values explored by the rover at the landing site near Statio Shiv Shakthi. Although it could not be concluded that the rock is indeed from the Lunar South pole, the study postulated multiple more theories on the impact created by the formation of the South-pole Atiken basiN, that has altered the geochemical composition of the Shiv Shakthi landing site.
