= Maskelynite =

Glassy material found in some meteorites and meteorite impact craters

Maskelynite (meteoritic glass)
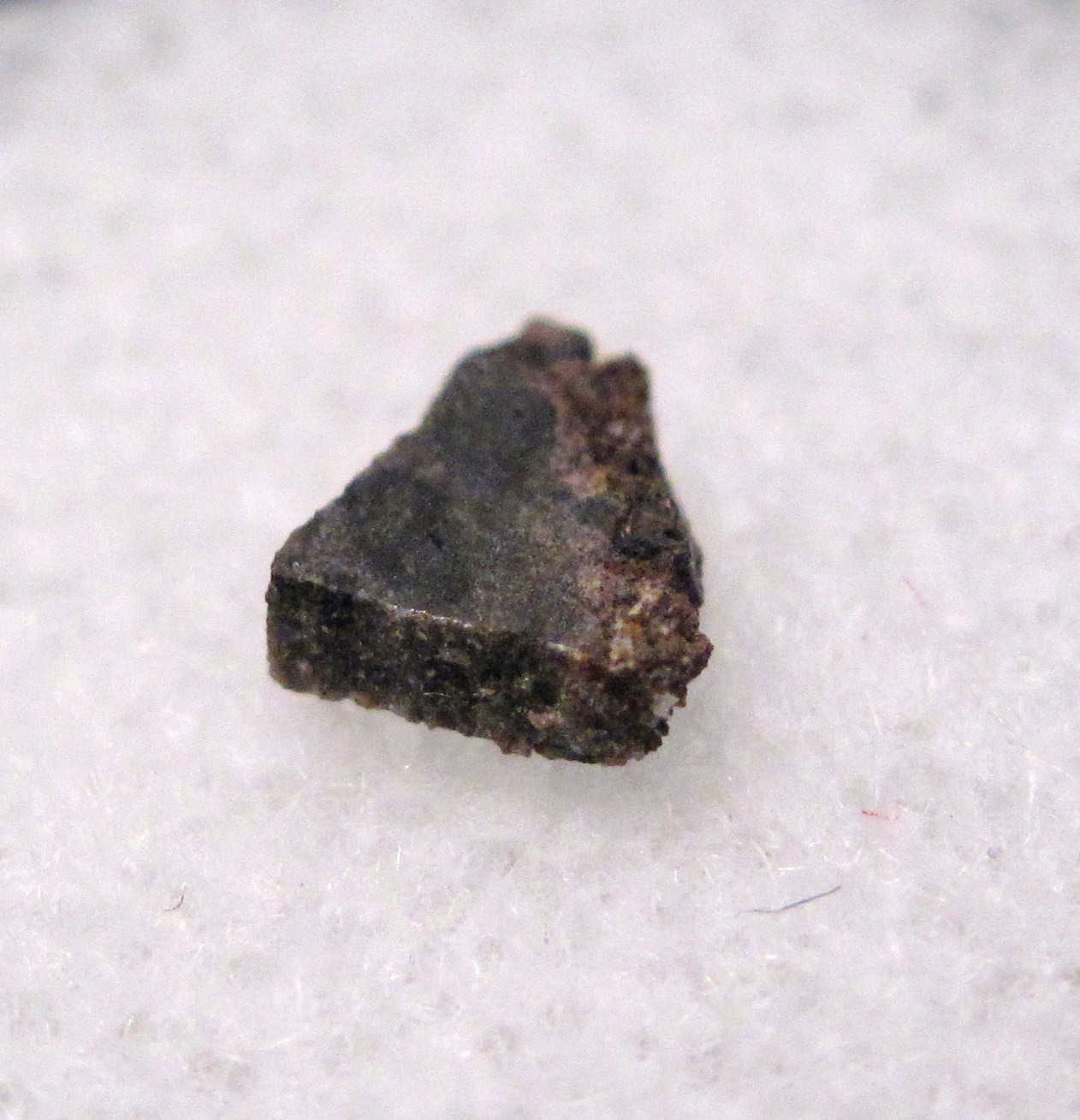
- NWA 1195, a Martian meteorite composed largely of maskelynite

General
- Category: Glass

Identification
- Luster: Vitreous

Maskelynite is a glassy material found in some meteorites and meteorite impact craters. Typical samples are similar in composition to plagioclase feldspar, and revert to that mineral when melted and recrystallized. It was named after British geologist M.H.N. Story-Maskelyne.

Since maskelynite (like the volcanic glass obsidian) lacks an orderly arrangement of atoms, it is not considered a "mineral" by geologists, and is not listed as such by the Mineralogical Society of America.

== History ==
The phase was first identified in the Shergotty meteorite by G. Tschermak (1872) as an isotropic glass of an unknown origin with near labradorite composition. Similar phases were found in chondrites and Martian meteorites. In 1963, D. J. Milton and P. S. de Carli produced a maskelynite-like glass by subjecting gabbro to an explosive shock wave. In 1967, T. E. Bunch and others identified maskelynite in the Clearwater West and Manicouagan impact structures.

== Origin ==
At first, maskelynite was believed to result from solid-state transformation of plagioclase into diaplectic glass by a relatively low-pressure shock wave (250 to 300 kilobars) and low-temperature (350°C), as in Milton and de Carli's experiment. Since 1997, this hypothesis has been challenged and now it is believed that the glass is formed by the quenching of dense mineral melts produced by higher-pressure shock waves.

== See also ==
- Glossary of meteoritics
