= Odell Glacier =

Glacier in Antarctica

- Location within Antarctica
- Location: Victoria Land
- Coordinates: 76°44′S 159°55′E
- Terminus: Mawson Glacier

The Odell Glacier (76°44′S 159°55′E) is a glacier draining northeast between Allan Hills and Coombs Hills into the upper Mawson Glacier in Victoria Land, Antarctica. It was named by the New Zealand Antarctic Place-Names Committee (NZ-APC) for Noel Odell, who was a mountaineer and was professor of geology at the University of Otago from 1950 to 1955.

== Location ==
The Odell Glacier forms between the Allan Hills and the Coombs Hills, which contain Mount Brooke. To the southwest of its head are Hall Rock, Brandau Rocks and Carapace Nunatak. The glacier flows northeast past the Convoy Range to the Mawson Glacier.

== Field camp ==
The United States set up an Antarctic field camp on the glacier during the summer of 2001 at 76°39′00″S 159°58′00″E.

== Tributary ==
=== Irving Glacier ===
76.2166667°S 160.2666667°E. A glacier that flows northwest between Coombs Hills and Wyandot Ridge to enter Odell Glacier. Named in association with nearby Wyandot Ridge after Captain R.K. Irving, U.S. Navy (USN), commander of USS Wyandot (AKA-92), a cargo ship in the Ross Sea Unit in Operation Deep Freeze IV, 1958-59.

== Features ==
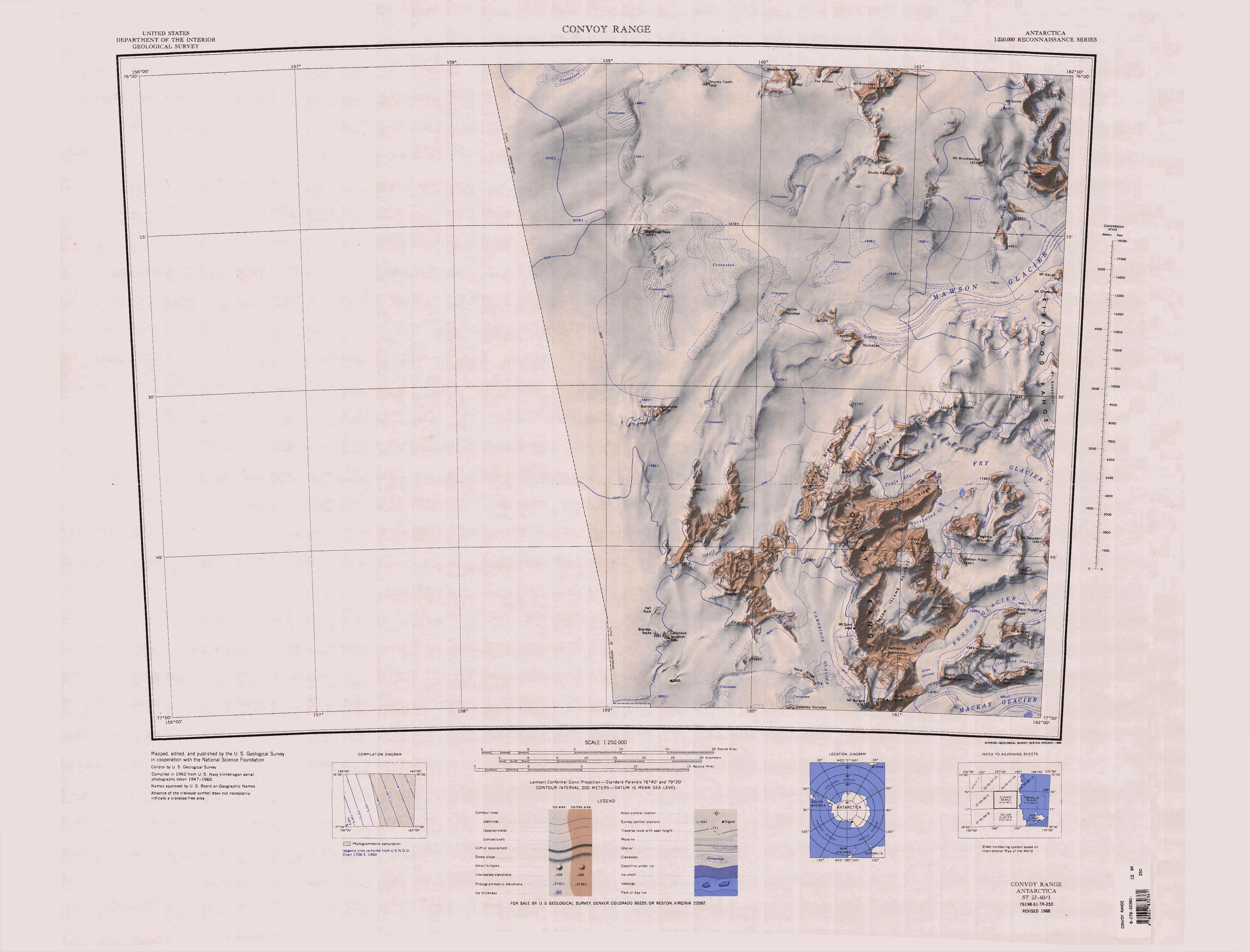
Glacier is to southwest of map

Features of the terrain around the glacier include:

=== Coombs Hills ===
76°47′S 160°00′E. An area of broken and largely snow-free hills and valleys between the Odell Glacier and Cambridge Glacier. Discovered in 1957 by the New Zealand Northern Survey Party of the Commonwealth Trans-Antarctic Expedition (CTAE) (1956-58) and named by them for Doug Coombs, professor of geology at the University of Otago, New Zealand, who assisted the expedition in obtaining essential petrological equipment.

=== Navarro Ridge ===
76°52′S 160°13′E A 3.5 nautical miles (6.5 km) long ridge that extends from the Coombs Hills southeastward to the west side of Cambridge Glacier. The central peak of the ridge rises to 2,100 metres (6,900 ft). It was named by the Advisory Committee on Antarctic Names in 2008 after members of the Navarro family who carried on support activities for the US Antarctic Program at the McMurdo, South Pole and Palmer Stations in the period 1989 to 2008: Kenneth Navarro, Palmer Station logistics supervisor who worked for 18 summer and four winter seasons at the three stations; Kenneth's wife Carol Gould Navarro, engaged in logistics and administration at Palmer and McMurdo for five summers and four winters; his sister Suzanne McCullough Navarro, a cook at McMurdo for four summers and one winter; his brother Steven Navarro, carpenter at Palmer and McMurdo for three summers and one winter; Kenneth and Carol's sons, Eliot Gould and Tyler Gould, also worked a few seasons in Antarctica.

=== Mount Brooke ===
76°49′S 159°54′E. A large isolated mountain, 2,675 metres (8,776 ft) high, standing 17 nautical miles (31 km; 20 mi) northwest of Mount Gran and dominating the area near the heads of Mackay Glacier and Mawson Glacier. Named for Lieutenant Commander F.R. Brooke, Royal Navy, leader of the 1957 New Zealand Northern Survey Party of the CTAE, 1956-58.

=== Hall Rock ===
76°51′S 159°20′E. A large rock located 2 nautical miles (3.7 km; 2.3 mi) northwest of Carapace Nunatak at the edge of the Antarctic Plateau. Named by the United States Advisory Committee on Antarctic Names (US-ACAN) for geologist Bradford A. Hall who, with Harold W. Borns, did research on the so-called Mawson Tillite in this vicinity, 1968-69.

=== Brandau Rocks ===
76°53′S 159°20′E. Rock exposures 0.5 nautical miles (0.93 km; 0.58 mi) west of Carapace Nunatak. Reconnoitered by the New Zealand Antarctic Research Programme (NZARP) Allan Hills Expedition (1964), who named the rocks for Lieutenant Commander James F. Brandau, United States Navy, helicopter pilot who made a difficult rescue flight to evacuate an injured member of the expedition.

=== Carapace Nunatak ===
76°53′S 159°24′E. A prominent isolated nunatak, the most westerly near the head of Mackay Glacier, standing 8 nautical miles (15 km; 9.2 mi) southwest of Mount Brooke where it is visible for a considerable distance from many directions. So named by the New Zealand party of the CTAE (1956-58) because of the carapaces of small crustaceans found in the rocks.

== Sources ==
- Alberts, Fred G., ed. (1995), Geographic Names of the Antarctic (PDF) (2 ed.), United States Board on Geographic Names This article incorporates public domain material from websites or documents of the United States Board on Geographic Names.
- Convoy Range, USGS: United States Geological Survey
- "Irving Glacier", Geographic Names Information System, United States Geological Survey, United States Department of the Interior

This article incorporates public domain material from websites or documents of the United States Geological Survey.
