= Mawson Glacier =

Glacier in Antarctica

- Location within Antarctica
- Location: Victoria Land
- Coordinates: 76°13′S 162°5′E
- Length: 35 nautical miles (65 km; 40 mi)
- Terminus: Ross Sea

The Mawson Glacier (76°13′S 162°5′E) is a large glacier on the east coast of Victoria Land, Antarctica, descending eastward from the Antarctic Plateau to the north of Trinity Nunatak and the Kirkwood Range, to enter the Ross Sea, where it forms the Nordenskjöld Ice Tongue. The glacier was first mapped by the British Antarctic Expedition (1907–09) and named for Douglas Mawson, the expedition physicist, who later led two other Antarctic expeditions, 1911–14, and 1929–31.

== Glaciology ==
After the Last Glacial Maximum (LGM) there was dynamic retreat of the ice sheet covering the Ross Sea in the Mawson Glacier region. The glacier thinned abruptly between 7,500 and 4,500 years ago, then thinned more gradually until recently. This thinning was very similar to what happened at the Mackay Glacier 100 kilometres (62 mi) to the south. Probably the ice sheet retreat and glacial ice drawdown were caused by ocean warming.

== Course ==
The Mawson Glacier rises on the Antarctic Plateau. Features of the region of its head include Battlements Nunatak, Reckling Peak, Jarina Nunatak and Trinity Nunatak. The Odell Glacier and Chattahoochee Glacier flows into the head of the glacier. Mawson Glacier flows east past the Walker Rocks and Mount Murray to its north and the Kirkwood Range to its south. It flows past Charcot Cove and Bruce Point to the north and the Oates Piedmont Glacier and Cape Day to its south, to terminate in the NordenSkjold Ice Tongue.

== Features ==
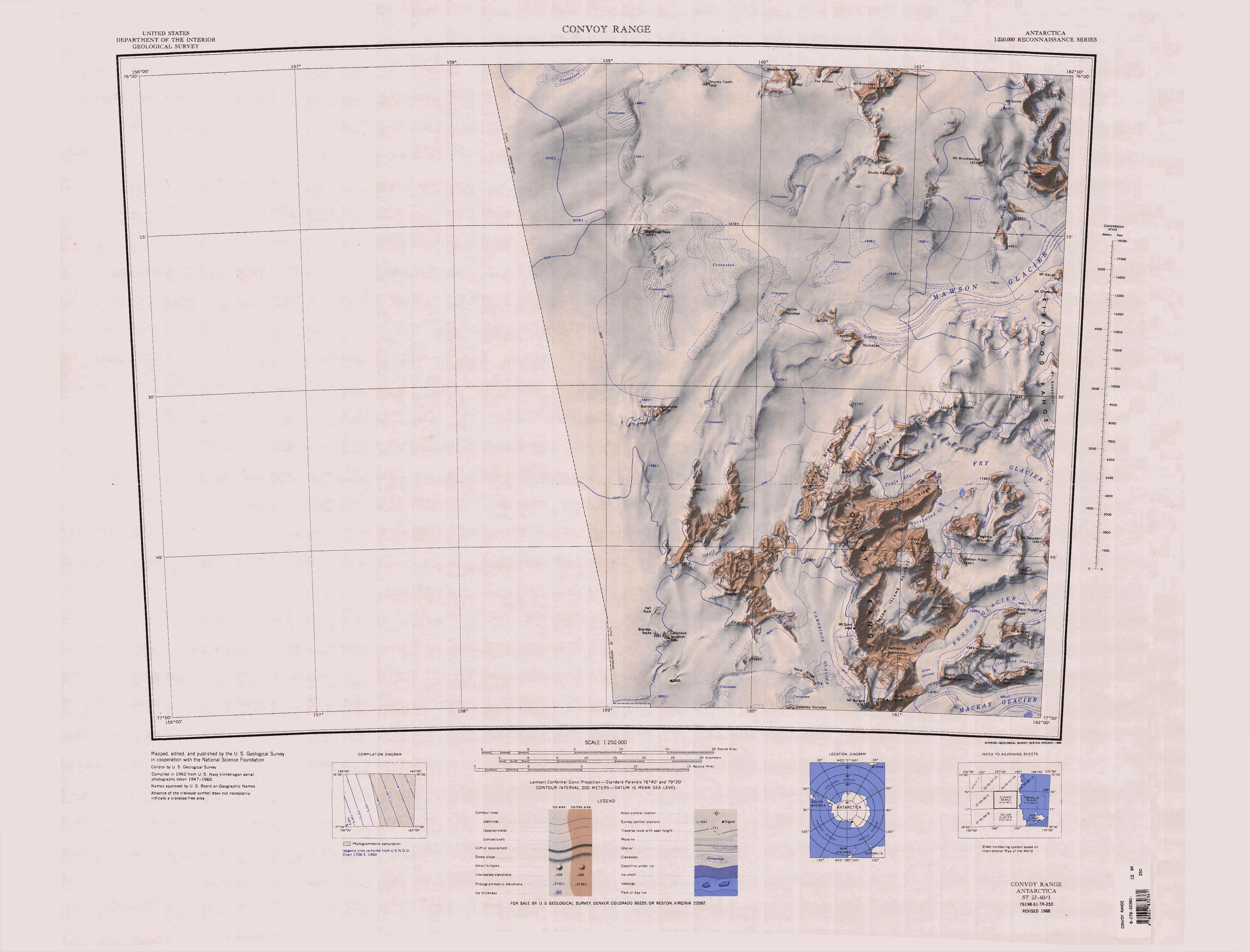
Upper section of the glacier (to the north)

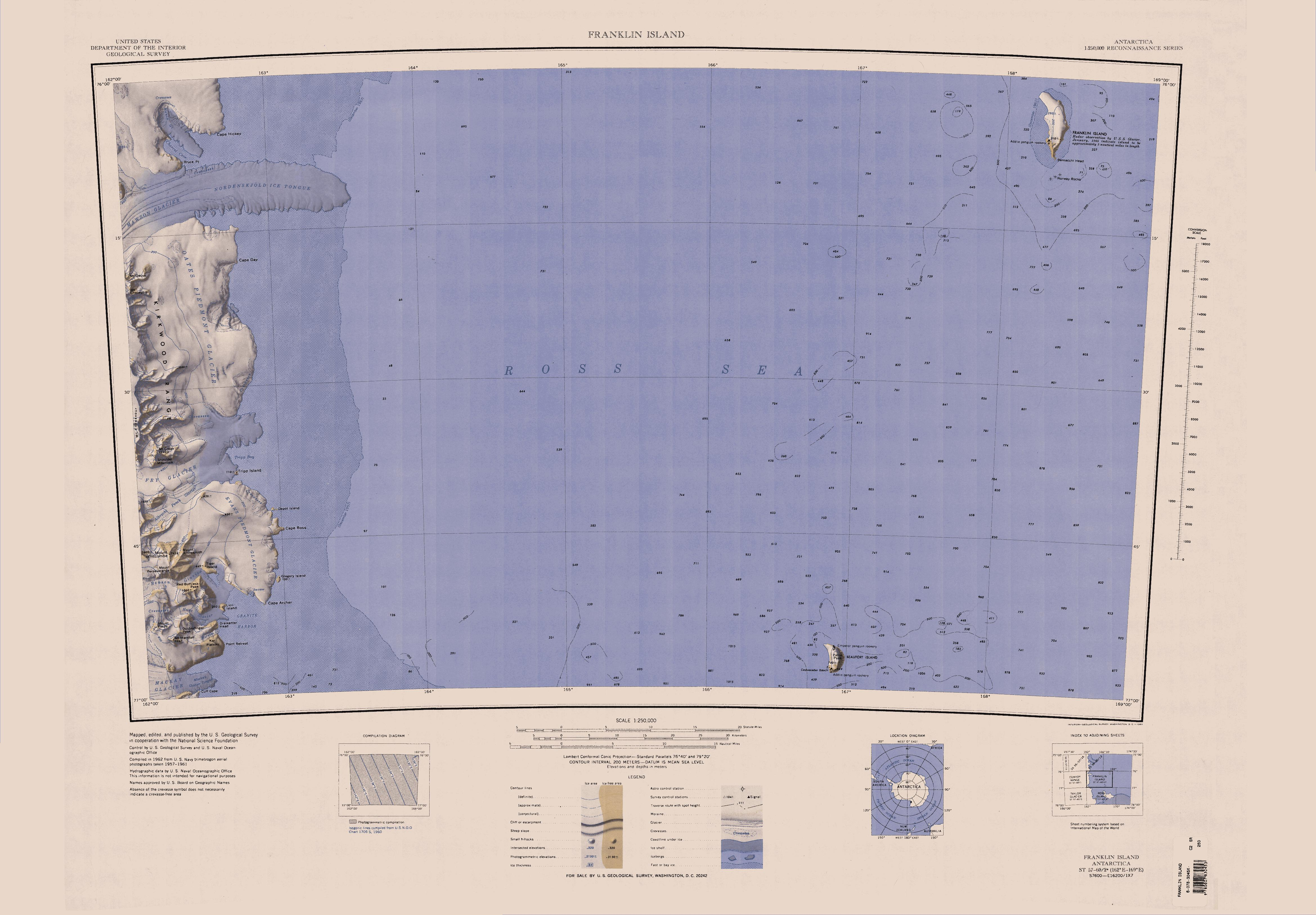
Lower section (to the northwest)

=== Battlements Nunatak ===
76°32′S 159°21′E. A large nunatak near the head of Mawson Glacier, about 6 nautical miles (11 km; 6.9 mi) northwest of Allan Hills. It is mostly ice free and has a number of small peaks running in a line west from the main peak. Discovered and named by the New Zealand party (1957–58) of the CTAE. The name describes the steep rock peaks of the nunatak.

=== Reckling Peak ===
76°16′S 159°15′E. An isolated peak, 2,010 metres (6,590 ft) high, which surmounts the central part of a ridge located at the icefalls at the head of Mawson Glacier. Mapped by USGS from ground surveys and Navy air photos. Named by US-ACAN in 1964 for Lt. Commander Darold L. Reckling, pilot with U.S. Navy Squadron VX-6, 1961.

=== Reckling Moraine ===
76°15′S 158°40′E. A moraine located 8 nautical miles (15 km; 9.2 mi) west of Reckling Peak, the latter at the head of Mawson Glacier. The site of the moraine is part of a long, narrow patch of bare ice that extends west from Reckling Peak, from which the moraine is named. The name arose following the collection of meteorites at the moraine by a USARP field party in the 1979–80 season.

=== Jarina Nunatak ===
76°23′S 160°10′E. Nunatak lying 7 nautical miles (13 km; 8.1 mi) west-northwest of the main summit of Trinity Nunatak in the stream of the Mawson Glacier. Named by US-ACAN in 1964 for Lt. Commander Michael Jarina, pilot with U.S. Navy Squadron VX-6 in 1962.

=== Trinity Nunatak ===
76°26′S 160°38′E. A large nunatak in the stream of the Mawson Glacier, about 5 nautical miles (9.3 km; 5.8 mi) north of the Convoy Range in Victoria Land. Mapped in 1957 by the New Zealand Northern Survey party of the CTAE (1956–58), which applied the name because of its three summits.

== Mouth ==
=== Charcot Cove ===
76°07′S 162°24′E. A re-entrant in the coast of Victoria Land between Bruce Point and Cape Hickey. Discovered by the BrNAE (1901–04) which named this feature for Dr. Jean B. Charcot, noted Arctic and Antarctic explorer.

=== Marin Glacier ===
76°04′S 162°22′E. A glacier just west of Cape Hickey, flowing southeast into Charcot Cove on the coast of Victoria Land. Mapped by USGS from ground surveys and Navy air photos. Named by US-AC AN in 1964 for Bonifacio Marin, engineman at McMurdo Station, 1962.

=== Bruce Point ===
76°08′S 162°26′E. A point situated at the south side of Charcot Cove on the coast of Victoria Land. Discovered by the BrNAE (1901–04) under Capt. Robert F. Scott, who named the feature for William S. Bruce, leader of the Scottish National Antarctic Expedition (1902–04).

=== Cape Hickey ===
76°05′S 162°38′E. Cape on the coast of Victoria Land, just east of Charcot Cove and Marin Glacier. It forms the outer, north portal of the re-entrant through which Mawson Glacier flows to the Ross Sea. Mapped by USGS from ground surveys and Navy air photos. Named by US-ACAN in 1964 for Lt. John Hickey, USN, pilot with Navy Squadron VX-6, who participated in Topo North and South surveys in 1962.

=== Cape Cornely ===
76°14′S 162°45′E. A cape on the coast of Victoria Land 3 nautical miles (5.6 km; 3.5 mi) north of Cape Day. The cape is marked by a rock exposure and is situated at the south side of the terminus of Mawson Glacier. Mapped by USGS from surveys and U.S. Navy aerial photographs, 1957–61. Named by US-ACAN for Joseph R. Cornely, USN, radioman with the wintering parties at Little America V, South Pole Station, and McMurdo Station in three years, 1958, 1961 and 1963.

=== Nordenskjöld Ice Tongue ===
76°11′S 162°45′E. A broad glacier tongue extending eastward from the Mawson Glacier into the Ross Sea. Discovered by the BrNAE (1901–04) and named for Otto Nordenskjold, Swedish geographer who led an expedition to Antarctica in 1901. This feature had become well established by the name Nordenskjold Ice Tongue prior to initiation of systematic application of common specific names to a glacier and its glacier tongue. Although this feature is a glacier tongue, the generic term ice tongue is retained in the name to reduce ambiguity.

=== Oates Piedmont Glacier ===
76°25′S 162°35′E An extensive lowland ice sheet east of the Kirkwood Range, occupying the whole of the coastal platform between the Fry Glacier and Mawson Glacier. Surveyed in 1957 and named by the N.Z. Northern Survey Party of the CTAE (1956–58) after Capt. Lawrence E.G. Oates who, with Captain Scott and three companions, perished on the return from the South Pole in 1912.

=== Cape Day ===
76°18′S 162°46′E. A cape on the coast of Victoria Land 11 nautical miles (20 km; 13 mi) east of Mount Gauss. First charted by the BrAE (1907–09) which named this cape after Bernard C. Day, electrician and motor expert with the expedition.

== Sources ==
- Alberts, Fred G., ed. (1995), Geographic Names of the Antarctic (PDF) (2 ed.), United States Board on Geographic Names This article incorporates public domain material from websites or documents of the United States Board on Geographic Names.
- Convoy Range, USGS: United States Geological Survey
- Franklin Island, USGS: United States Geological Survey
- Jones, R.S.; Whitmore, R.J.; Mackintosh, A.N.; Norton, K.P.; Eaves, S.R.; Stutz, J.; Christl, M. (2020), "Regional-scale abrupt Mid-Holocene ice sheet thinning in the western Ross Sea, Antarctica", Geology, 49 (3): 278–282, doi:10.1130/G48347.1
