= Adrian Hayter =

New Zealand soldier, sailor and Antarctic leader (1914–1990)

Adrian Hayter MBE MC
- Born: Adrian Goodenough Hayter; 22 December 1914; Timaru, New Zealand
- Died: 14 June 1990 (aged 75); Nelson, New Zealand
- Notable work: Sheila in the Wind,The Second Step

Adrian Goodenough Hayter MBE MC (22 December 1914 – 14 June 1990) was a New Zealand soldier, sailor, Antarctic expedition leader and author.

== Biography ==
Hayter was born in Timaru in 1914 and was educated at Nelson College from 1926 to 1931. He then went to the Royal Military College, Sandhurst, after which he was attached to 1st Battalion East Surrey Regiment in India, before joining his regiment, the 2nd King Edward VII's Own Gurkha Rifles, in 1934. He was awarded the Military Cross for actions in Burma in 1944.

Hayter left the army in 1947, but returned to his regiment during the early years of the Malayan Emergency, and later became the chief instructor at the Jungle Warfare School. In December 1949, he was appointed a Member of the Order of the British Empire, for services in Malaya. He later wrote of his experiences in the army in the book The Second Step, which was published in 1962.

In 1950, Hayter resigned his commission, and travelled to England where bought a 32-foot Albert Strange-designed yawl called Sheila II. After learning the basics of celestial navigation by correspondence, he sailed to New Zealand via Gibraltar, the Suez Canal, India, Malaya and Australia, finally arriving in Westport in 1956. In doing so, he became the first person to sail solo from the United Kingdom to New Zealand. He recounted the story of his journey in the book Sheila in the Wind, published in 1959.

Hayter returned to Britain in 1961 and purchased the Norwegian-built 25-foot sloop Valkyr, which he sailed solo to New Zealand via the Canary Islands and the Panama Canal. He wrote of his experiences in Business in Great Waters, published in 1965.

After his return to New Zealand, Hayter became the sailing instructor at the newly opened Cobham Outward Bound School at Anakiwa.

In 1964, Hayter was appointed to head the New Zealand Antarctic expedition for a year at Scott Base, where he wintered over. Once again, he wrote a book, The Year of the Quiet Sun (published 1968), about his experience. Subsequently, he was awarded the Polar Medal in 1969.

Hayter twice stood unsuccessfully for the New Zealand parliament in the Tasman electorate, the first time in 1975 as an independent candidate, and then in 1984 under the banner of the New Zealand Party.

Hayter died in Nelson from cancer in 1990, and was buried at Wakapuaka Cemetery.

== Works ==
- Sheila in the wind. Hodder and Stoughton, London (1959)
- The second step. Hodder & Stoughton, London (1962)
- Business in great waters. Hodder and Stoughton, London (1965)
- The year of the quiet sun. Hodder & Stoughton, London (1968)
- A man called Peters. Hodder and Stoughton, Auckland (1977)
- The dolphin's message. Self-published, Nelson (1981)
- The missing piece. Self-published, Nelson (1983)
