= New Swabia =

Territory of Antarctica in Queen Maud Land, first explored by Nazi Germany in 1938/39

New Swabia Neuschwabenland
- Defunct potential Antarctic claim of Nazi Germany
- Expedition logo (1938–39)

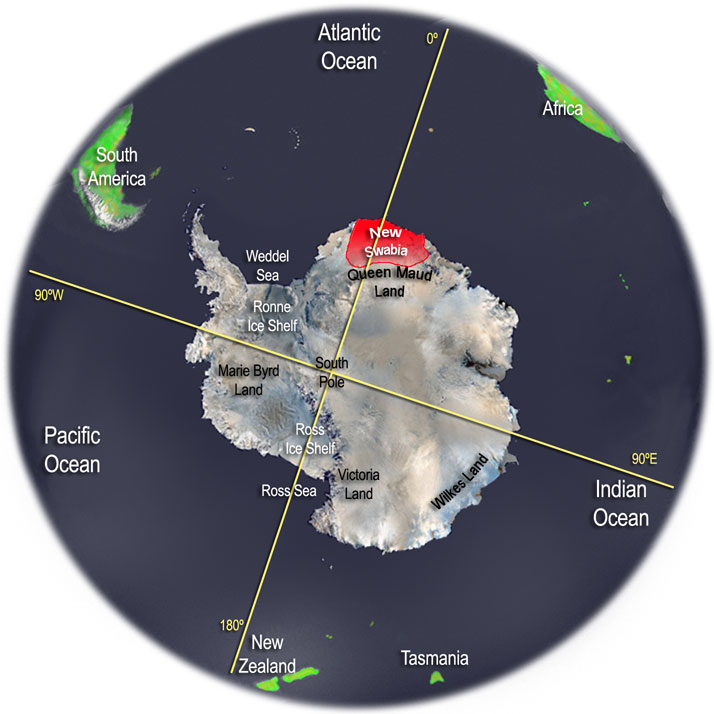
- Territory comprising New Swabia shown in red
- Historical era: World War II
  - Contact reached: 19 January 1939
  - German occupation of Norway: 9 April 1940
  - Surrender of Germany: 8 May 1945
- Today part of: Queen Maud Land

New Swabia (Norwegian and German: Neuschwabenland) was an area of Antarctica explored, with the intention to claim it, by Nazi Germany between 1938 and 1939, within the Norwegian territorial claim of Queen Maud Land. The region was named after the expedition's ship, Schwabenland, itself named after the German region of Swabia. Although the name "New Swabia" is occasionally mentioned in historical contexts, it is not an officially recognized cartographic name in modern use. The area is now part of Queen Maud Land, governed under the Antarctic Treaty System.

== Geography ==
New Swabia is divided into an ice-covered northern foreland, which gradually rises from the coast and the edge of the ice shelf to over 1,000 m (Ritscher Upland and Helle Slope). To the south, it is followed by a region of nunataks rising from the ice and mountain ranges with heights over 3,000 m. These mountain ranges dam up the glaciers of the polar plateau to over 2,000 m. The high-altitude glacial regions are named after the famous polar explorers Roald Amundsen and Alfred Wegener.

The ice-free areas vary greatly in morphology. In addition to kilometers of fault scarps that run roughly parallel to the continental margin and are particularly prevalent in the west, central and east, New Swabia is dominated by mountain ranges in the north-south that follow old, preglacial valley systems. Three mighty glaciers drain this sector of East Antarctica: At 20°W, the Stancomb-Wills Glacier flows westward onto the Brunt Ice Shelf. The boundary between western and central New Swabia is marked by the Jutulstraumen Glacier, which feeds the Fimbul Ice Shelf. The 200 km wide glacier Borchgrevinkisen forms the eastern border of New Swabia.

At the eastern end of New Swabia lies the deep-sea trench Schwabenland Canyon.

=== Seasonally ice-free lakes ===
A geographical feature of New Swabia is its ice-free freshwater lakes during the Antarctic summer. These lakes are located on the 34 km² hilly plateau, the Schirmacher Oasis (or Schirmacher Lake Plateau), at 70° 45′ S, 11° 40′ E. 118 lakes with a total area of 6,487 km² are known. Only a portion of these lakes develop on the bedrock; some lakes also lie on the ice shelf immediately north of the oasis. All lakes contain a rich algal flora, with 72 species identified. The discoverer of the Schirmacher Oasis was Richardheinrich Schirmacher, pilot of the second flying boat, the Boreas, of the expedition ship Schwabenland.

=== Lakes with permanent ice cover ===
The Obersee and Untersee lie on the northern edge of the Gruber Mountains at 795 m and 580 m above sea level, respectively. The Obersee covers an area of 3.43 km², while the Untersee is 11.4 km², making them the largest lakes in New Swabia. They are covered in ice year-round and fill deep, carved-out trough valleys. The lakes are dammed by glaciers and have no outflow.

== Climate and vegetation ==
New Swabia has a high polar climate with temperatures below freezing around the year. The low air temperatures are partially set off by strong solar radiation in the Antarctic summer (December to February). Temperatures of up to +19°C have been measured on rock surfaces, allowing simple vegetation to grow on these rocky substrates. The necessary water is created by melting, drifting snow on rock surfaces exposed to the sun. In the central area of New Swabia, simple filamentous algae (Prasiola and Ulothrix) and lichens have been found alongside cyanobacteria. The species Lecidea sp., Rhizocarpon geographicum and Usnea sphacelata are particularly common. Two moss species (Grimmia lawiana and Sarconeurum glaciale) have also been found in favorable locations.

== Background ==
Like many other countries, Germany sent expeditions to the Antarctic region in the late 19th and early 20th centuries, most of which were scientific. The late 19th century expeditions to the Southern Ocean, South Georgia, the Kerguelen Islands, and the Crozet Islands were astronomical, meteorological, and hydrological, mostly in close collaboration with scientific teams from other countries. As the 19th century ended, Germany began to focus on Antarctica.

The first German expedition to Antarctica was the Gauss expedition from 1901 to 1903. Led by Arctic veteran and geology professor Erich von Drygalski, this was the second expedition to use a hot-air balloon in Antarctica. It also found and named Kaiser Wilhelm II Land. The second German Antarctic expedition (1911–1912) was led by Wilhelm Filchner with a goal of crossing Antarctica to learn if it was one piece of land. As happened with other such early attempts, the crossing failed before it even began. The expedition discovered and named the Luitpold Coast and the Filchner Ice Shelf. A German whaling fleet was put to sea in 1937 and, upon its successful return in early 1938, plans for a third German Antarctic expedition were drawn up.

== German Antarctic Expedition (1938–1939) ==
The third German Antarctic Expedition (1938–1939) was led by arctic veteran Alfred Ritscher (1879–1963), a captain in the German Navy. The main purpose was to find an area in Antarctica for a German whaling station, as a way to increase Germany's production of fat. Whale oil was then the most important raw material for the production of margarine and soap in Germany and the country was the second largest purchaser of Norwegian whale oil, importing some 200,000 metric tonnes annually. Besides the disadvantage of being dependent on imports, it was thought that Germany would soon be at war, which was considered to put too much strain on Germany's foreign currency reserves. In addition, there was a secret military assignment to explore the islands of Trindade and Martim Vaz for use as potential future naval bases.

On 17 December 1938, the secret New Swabia Expedition with 82 crew members left Hamburg for Antarctica aboard MS Schwabenland (a freighter built in 1925 and renamed in 1934 after the Swabia region in southern Germany) which could also carry and catapult aircraft. On 19 January 1939, the ship arrived at the Princess Martha Coast, in an area which had been claimed, as the expedition was already underway, by Norway as Queen Maud Land, and began charting the region. Naming the area Neu-Schwabenland after the ship, meanwhile the ship served as expedition base. Seven photographic survey flights were made by the ship's two Dornier Wal seaplanes named Passat and Boreas. About a dozen 1.2-meter (3.9 ft)-long aluminum darts, with 30-centimeter (12 in) steel cones and three upper stabilizer wings embossed with swastikas, were supposed to be airdropped onto the ice at turning points of the flight polygons (these darts had been tested on the Pasterze glacier in Austria before the expedition). According to expedition members, these darts were only dropped once, all together. Eight more flights were made to areas of keen interest, and on these trips some of the photos were taken with colour film by the geologist Ernst Herrmann. Altogether they flew over hundreds of thousands of square kilometers and took more than 16,000 aerial photographs, some of which were published after the war by Ritscher. The ice-free Schirmacher Oasis, which now hosts the Maitri and Novolazarevskaya research stations, was spotted from the air by Richard Heinrich Schirmacher (who named it after himself) shortly before Schwabenland left the Antarctic coast on 6 February 1939.

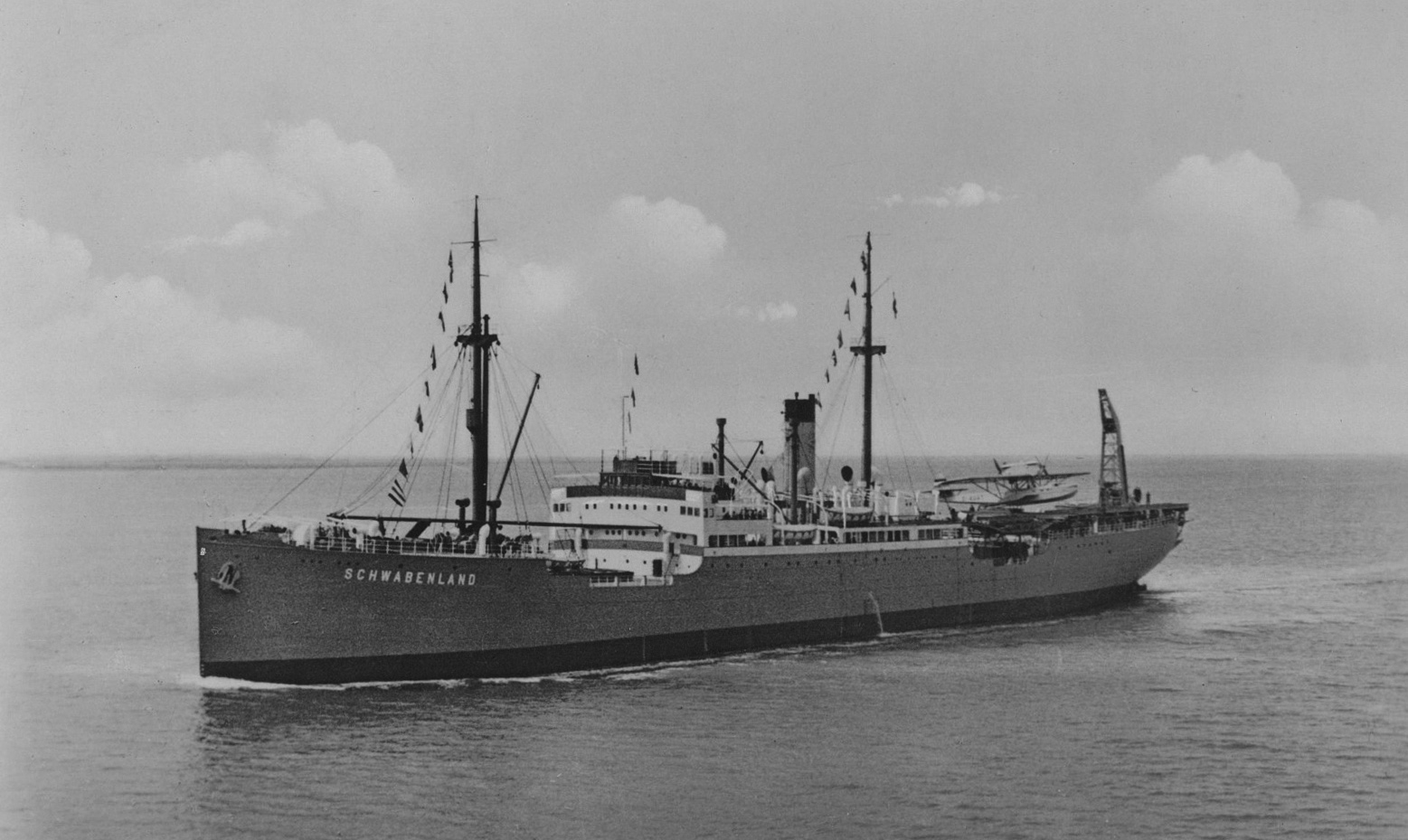
MS Schwabenland in 1938

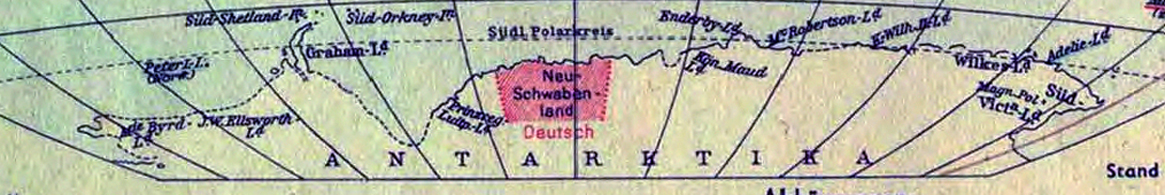
German map of Antarctica (1941) showing Neuschwabenland

On its return trip to Germany, the expedition made oceanographic studies near Bouvet Island and Fernando de Noronha, arriving back in Hamburg on 11 April 1939. Meanwhile, the Norwegian government had learned about the expedition through the director of the NSIU, Adolf Hoel, who heard of the news by chance, from Ernst Hermann's wife. Furthermore the Norwegian government had received reports from whalers along the coast of Queen Maud Land.

Germany never advanced any territorial claims to the region.

== Geographic features mapped by the expedition ==
Because the area was first explored by a German expedition, the name Neuschwabenland (New Swabia) is still used for the region on some maps, as are many of the German names given to its geographic features. Some geographic features mapped by the expedition were not named until the Norwegian-British-Swedish Antarctic Expedition (NBSAE) (1949–1952), led by John Schjelderup Giæver. Others were not named until they were remapped from aerial photographs taken by the Norwegian Antarctic Expedition (1958–1959).

The exact location of objects in italics could not yet be determined because the position was given too imprecisely in the expedition report due to navigation problems with the aircraft, and most of the aerial photographs that would have allowed identification were lost during World War II. The names of objects that could be clearly located were used in the Norwegian translation of the topographical map Dronning Maud Land 1:250,000 published by the Norwegian Polar Institute in 1966.

Name	Name on the Norwegian Map	Position (Location in the "Bundesanzeiger")	Named after / Note
Humboldt Mountains	Humboldtfjella	71° 24′–72° S, 11°–12° E	Alexander von Humboldt
Humboldt Graben	Humboldtsøkket	Near the eastern border of the Humboldt Mountains	Alexander von Humboldt
The Altar	Altaret	71° 36′ S, 11° 18′ E	distinctive mountain shape
Amelang Plateau	Ladfjella	74° S, 6° 12′–6° 30′ W	Herbert Amelang, First Officer of Schwabenland
Am Überlauf (At the Overflow)	Grautrenna	Easterly to the Eckhörner Peaks	glaciated pass
Barkley Mountains	Barkleyfjella	72° 48′ S, 1° 30′–0° 48′ E	Erich Barkley (1912–1944), biologist
Bastion	Bastionen	71° 18′ S, 13° 36′ E	prominent buttress-type mountain
Bludau Mountains	Hallgrenskarvet and Heksegryta	Part of a 150 km mountain range 72° 42′ S, 3° 30′ W and 74° S, 5° W	Josef Bludau (1889–1967), ship's surgeon
Mount Bolle		72° 18′ S, 6° 30′ E	Herbert Bolle, Deutsche Lufthansa, foreman of the aircraft assemblers
Boreas Nunatak	Boreas		Dornier Wal D-AGAT Boreas expedition aircraft
Mount Brandt		72° 13′ S, 1° 0′ E	Emil Brandt (* 1900), sailor, saved an expedition member from drowning
Bruns Nunataks		72° 05′ S, 1° 0′ E	Herbert Bruns (* 1908), electrical engineer of the expedition ship
Buddenbrock Range		71° 42′ S, 6° E	Friedrich Freiherr von Buddenbrock, operations manager of Atlantic Flights at Deutsche Lufthansa
Bundermann Range	Grytøyrfjellet	71° 48′–72° S, 3° 24′ E	Max Bundermann (* 1904), aerial photographer
Conrad Mountains	Conradfjella	71° 42′–72° 18′ S, 10° 30′ E	Fritz Conrad
Mount Dallmann	Dallmannfjellet	71° 42′–72° S, closely west 11° E	Eduard Dallmann
Drygalski Mountains	Drygalskifjella	71° 6′–71° 48′ S, 7° 6′–9° 30′ E	Erich von Drygalski
Eckhörner Peaks	Hjørnehorna	North end of the Humboldt Mountains	distinctively shaped mountain
Filchner Mountains	Filchnerfjella	71° 6′–71° 48′ S, 7° 6′–9° 30′ E	Wilhelm Filchner
Gablenz Range		72°–72° 18′ S, 5° E	Carl August von Gablenz
Gburek Peaks	Gburektoppane	72° 42′ S, 0° 48′–1° 10′ W	Leo Gburek (1910–1941), geophysicist
Gessner Peak	Gessnertind	71° 54′ S, 6° 54′ E	Wilhelm Gessner (1890–1945), director of Hansa Luftbild
Gneiskopf Peak	Gneisskolten	71° 54′ S, 12° 12′ E	prominent peak
Gockel Ridge	Vorrkulten	73° 12′ S, 0° 12′ W	Wilhelm Gockel, meteorologist of the expedition
Graue Hörner (Grey Horns)	Gråhorna	southern corner of the Petermann Ranges	
Gruber-Berge (in northern Mühlig-Hofmann Mountains)	Slokstallen und Petrellfjellet	72° S, 4° E	Erich Gruber (1912–1940), radio operator of D-AGAT Boreas; not to be confused with Gruber Mountains
Habermehl Peak	Habermehltoppen	west of the Gessner Peak	Richard Habermehl, head of the Reich Weather Service
Mount Hädrich		71° 57′ S, 6° 12′ E	Willy Hädrich, authorized officer of Deutsche Lufthansa, responsible for the accounts of the expedition
Mount Hedden		72° 8′ S, 1° 10′ E	Karl Hedden, sailor, saved an expedition member from drowning
Herrmann Mountains		73° S, 0°–1° E	Ernst Herrmann, geologist of the expedition
Schüssel Cirque	Grautfatet	in the northern Humboldt Mountains	glaciated valley
Muller Crest	Müllerkammen		Johannes Müller († 1941), participant in the 2nd German South Polar Expedition in 1911/12, head of the Nautical Department of North German Lloyd
Kaye Crest	Langfloget	72° 30′ S, 4° 48′ E	Georg Kaye, naval architect, looked after the ships of Lufthansa
Kleinschmidt Peak	Enden	Part of a 150 km long ridge between 72°42′ S, 3°30′ W and 74° S, 5° W	Ernst Kleinschmidt, German Maritime Observatory
Kottas Mountains	Milorgfjella	74° 6′–74° 18′ S, 8° 12′–9° W	Alfred Kottas, Captain of Schwabenland
Kraul Mountains	Vestfjella		Otto Kraul, ice pilot
Mount Krüger	Kvitskarvet	73° 6′ S, 1° 18′ E	Walter Krüger, meteorologist of the expedition
Kubus	Kubus	72° 24′ S, 7° 30′ E	distinctive mountain shape
Kurze Mountains	Kurzefjella	72° 6′–72° 30′ S, 9° 30′–10° E	Friedrich Kurze, Vice-Admiral, head of the Nautical Department of the Naval High Command
Lange-Plateau		71° 58′ S, 0° 25′ E	Heinz Lange (1908–1943), meteorological assistant
Loesener Plateau	Skorvetangen, Hamarskorvene and Kvithamaren	72° S, 4° 18′ E	Kurt Loesener, airplane mechanic of D-AGAT Boreas
Lose Mountain	Lausflæet		distinctive mountain shape
Luz Range		72°–72° 18′ S, 5° 30′ E	Martin Luz, commercial director of German Lufthansa
Mayr Ridge	Jutulsessen	72°–72° 18′ S, 3° 24′ E	Rudolf Mayr, Pilot of D-ALOX Passat aircraft
Matterhorn	Ulvetanna	highest peak in the Drygalski Mountains	distinctive mountain shape
Mount Mentzel	Mentzelfjellet	71° 18′ S, 13° 42′ E	Rudolf Mentzel
Mühlig-Hofmann Mountains	Mühlig-Hofmannfjella	71° 48′–72° 36′ S, 3° E	Albert Mühlig-Hofmann
Neumayer Cliffs	Neumayerskarvet		Georg von Neumayer
New Swabia			Expedition ship Schwabenland
Nordwestliche Insel Mountains	Nordvestøya	North end of the Humboldt Mountains	island-like nunatak group
Eastern Hochfeld	Austre Høgskeidet	between the southern and central sections of the Petermann Range	Ice tongue
Lake Ober-See	Øvresjøen	71° 12′ S, 13° 42′ E	frozen lake
Passat Nunatak	Passat		Donier Wal D-ALOX Passat aircraft
Paulsen Mountains	Brattskarvet, Vendeholten und Vendehø	72° 24′ S, 1° 30′ E	Karl-Heinz Paulsen, oceanographer of the expedition
Payer Mountains	Payerfjella	72° 0′ S, 14° 42′ E	Julius von Payer
Penck Glacier	Pencksøkket		Albrecht Penck
Petermann Ranges	Petermannkjeda	Between the Humboldt Mountains and the central Wohlthat Mountains [=Gruber Mountains] on 71°18′–72°9′ S	August Petermann
Preuschoff Range	Hochlinfjellet	72° 18′–72° 30′ S, 4° 30′ E	Franz Preuschoff, airplane mechanic of D-ALOX Passat
Regula Range	Regulakjeda		Herbert Regula (1910–1980), First Meteorologist of the expedition
Ritscher Peak	Ritschertind	71° 24′ S, 13° 24′ E	Alfred Ritscher
Ritscher Upland	Ritscherflya		Alfred Ritscher
Mount Röbke	Isbrynet		Karl-Heinz Röbke (* 1909), Second Officer of Schwabenland
Mount Ruhnke	Festninga	72° 30′ S, 4° E	Herbert Ruhnke (1904–1944), radio operator on D-ALOX Passat
Sauter Mountain bar	Terningskarvet	72° 36′ S, 3° 18′ E	Siegfried Sauter, aerial photographer
Schirmacher Ponds	Schirmacher Oasis	70° 40′ S, 11° 40′ E	Richardheinrich Schirmacher, pilot of D-AGAT Boreas
Schneider-Riegel		73° 42′ S, 3° 18′ W	Hans Schneider, head of the Sea-Flight Department of the German Maritime Observatory and Professor of Meteorology
Schubertpeak	Høgfonna und Ovbratten	Part of a 150 km long ridge between 72°42′ S, 3°30′ W und 74° S, 5° W	Otto von Schubert, head of the Nautical Department of the German Maritime Observatory
Schulz Heights	Lagfjella	73° 42′ S, 7° 36′ W	Robert Schulz, Second Engineer of Schwabenland
Mount Schicht	Sjiktberga	71° 24′ S, 13° 12′ E	distinctive mountain (German Schicht = layer)
Schwarze Hörner (Black horns)	Svarthorna	southern corner of the northern part of the Petermann Ranges	distinctive mountain range
Mount Seekopf	Sjøhausen	71° 12′ S, 13° 48′ E	distinctive mountain
Seilkopf Peaks	Nälegga	Part of a 150 km long ridge between 72°42′ S, 3°30′ W and° S, 5° W	Heinrich Seilkopf, head of the Sea-Flight Department of the German Maritime Observatory and Professor of Meteorology
Sphinxkopf Peak	Sfinksskolten	On the north end of the Petermann Ranges	distinctive mountain
Spieß Peak	Huldreslottet	Part of a 150 km long ridge between 72°42′ S, 3°30′ W and 74° S, 5° W	Admiral Fritz Spieß, commander of the research vessel Meteor
Stein Nunataks	Straumsnutane		Willy Stein, boatswain of Schwabenland
Todt Ridge	Todtskota	71° 18′ S, 14° 18′ E	Herbert Todt, assistant to the expedition leader
Uhligpeak	Uhligberga	Part of a 150 km long ridge between 72°42′ S, 3°30′ W and 74° S, 5° W	Karl Uhlig, First Engineer of Schwabenland
Lake Untersee	Nedresjøen	71° 18′ S, 13° 30′ E	frozen lake
Vorposten Peak	Forposten	71° 24′ S, 15° 48′ E	remote nunatak
Western Hochfeld	Vestre Høgskeidet		glaciated plain
Weyprecht Mountains	Weyprechtfjella	72° 0′ S, 13° 30′ E	Carl Weyprecht
Wegener Inland Ice	Wegenerisen		Alfred Wegener
Witte Peaks	Marsteinen, Valken, Krylen und Knotten		Dietrich Witte, engine attendant of Schwabenland
Wohlthat Mountain Range	Wohlthatmassivet		Helmuth Wohlthat
Mount Zimmermann	Zimmermannfjellet	71° 18′ S, 13° 24′ E	Carl Zimmermann, vice-president of the German Research Foundation
Mount Zuckerhut	Sukkertoppen	71° 24′ S, 13° 30′ E	distinctive mountain shape
Zwiesel Mountain	Zwieselhøgda	at the southern end of the Petermann Ranges	

=== Aftermath ===
Germany made no formal territorial claims to New Swabia. No whaling station or other lasting bases were built there by Germany, and no permanent presence was established until the Georg von Neumayer Station, a research facility, was opened in 1981. Germany's current Neumayer Station III is also located in the region.

Although New Swabia is occasionally mentioned in historical contexts, it is not an officially recognized cartographic designation today. The region is part of Queen Maud Land, administered by Norway as a dependent territory under the Antarctic Treaty System, and overseen by the Polar Affairs Department of the Ministry of Justice and the Police.

== Conspiracy theories ==
Neuschwabenland has been the subject of conspiracy theories for decades, some of them related to Nazi UFO claims. Most assert that, in the wake of the German expedition of 1938–39, a huge military base was built there. After the war, high-ranking Nazis, scientists, and elite military units are claimed to have survived there. The US and UK have supposedly been trying to conquer the area for decades, and to have used nuclear weapons in this effort. Proponents claim the base is sustained by hot springs providing energy and warmth.

The WDR radio play Neuschwabenland-Symphonie from 2012 takes up the conspiracy theories.

== See also ==
- German Antarctic Expedition (1938–1939)
- Antarctica during World War II
- Esoteric Nazism
- List of Antarctic expeditions
- Operation Highjump

== Literature ==
- Murphy, D.T. (2002). German exploration of the polar world. A history, 1870–1940 Lincoln : University of Nebraska Press. ISBN 978-0803232051, OCLC 48084187
