= Vystrel Mountain =

Mountain in Queen Maud Land, Antarctica

Vystrel Mountain (71°37′S 15°4′E) is a partly snow-covered mountain, 1,995 m, standing 1 nautical mile (1.9 km) south of Mount Rukhin at the south end of the Lomonosov Mountains in Queen Maud Land. Discovered and first plotted from air photos by German Antarctic Expedition, 1938–39. Mapped from air photos by Norwegian Antarctic Expedition, 1958–59; remapped by Soviet Antarctic Expedition, 1960–61, and named Gora Vystrel (shot mountain).
