= Steinbotnen Cirque =

Cirque in Antarctica

Steinbotnen Cirque (71°18′S 13°21′E) is a cirque in the west wall of Steinmulen Shoulder, in the Gruber Mountains of the Wohlthat Mountains, Queen Maud Land. Discovered and plotted from air photos by German Antarctic Expedition, 1938–39. Replotted from air photos and surveys by Norwegian Antarctic Expedition, 1956–60, and named Steinbotnen (the stone cirque).
