= Mirazh Mountain =

Mountain in Queen Maud Land, Antarctica

Mirazh Mountain (71°18′S 13°25′E) is a peak rising to 1,485 metres (4,870 ft) on the north-central part of Steinmulen Shoulder in the Gruber Mountains of Queen Maud Land, Antarctica. It was discovered and plotted from air photos by Third German Antarctic Expedition in 1938–39, and was mapped from air photos and surveys by the Sixth Norwegian Antarctic Expedition, 1956–60. The mountain was remapped by the Soviet Antarctic Expedition in 1960–61, and named "Gora Mirazh" (mirage mountain).
