= Ekho Mountain =

Mountain in Antarctica

Ekho Mountain (71°28′S 15°26′E) is a mountain, 1,690 metres (5,540 ft) high, standing 3 nautical miles (6 km) southwest of Vorposten Peak in the Lomonosov Mountains, Queen Maud Land. It was discovered and roughly plotted from air photos by the Third German Antarctic Expedition, 1938–39. It was mapped from air photos and surveys by the Sixth Norwegian Antarctic Expedition, 1958–59, was remapped by the Soviet Antarctic Expedition, 1960–61, and named "Gora Ekho" ("Echo Mountain").
