= Mount Rukhin =

Mountain in Queen Maud Land, Antarctica

Mount Rukhin (71°35′S 15°7′E) is a small mountain with a height of 1,740 m, standing 9 nautical miles (17 km) southwest of Ekho Mountain in the Lomonosov Mountains, Queen Maud Land. It was mapped from air photos by Norwegian Antarctic Expedition in 1958 and 1959, and the Soviet Antarctic Expedition in 1960 and 1961. It was named after L.B. Rukhin, professor at Leningrad State University, who died in 1959.
