= Utrista Rock =

Rock formation in Antarctica

Utrista Rock (71°35′S 10°32′E) is an isolated rock lying 10 nautical miles (18 km) northeast of Mount Dallmann, at the northeast extremity of the Orvin Mountains in Queen Maud Land. Discovered and photographed by the German Antarctic Expedition 1938–39. Mapped by Norway from air photos and surveys by Norwegian Antarctic Expedition, 1956–60, and named Utrista (the outer ridge).
