= Kvitkleven Cirque =

Cirque in Antarctica

Kvitkleven Cirque (72°0′S 7°43′E) is an ice-filled cirque at the south side of Klevekampen Mountain in the Filchner Mountains of Queen Maud Land, Antarctica. It was first plotted from air photos by the Third German Antarctic Expedition (1938–39). The cirque was mapped from surveys and air photos by the Sixth Norwegian Antarctic Expedition (1956–60) and named Kvitkleven (the white closet).
