= Osechka Peak =

Mountain in Queen Maud Land, Antarctica

Osechka Peak (71°31′S 15°26′E) is a small peak, 1,740 m, standing 6 nautical miles (11 km) south of Vorposten Peak in Lomonosov Mountains, Queen Maud Land. Mapped from air photos and surveys by Norwegian Antarctic Expedition, 1958–59; remapped by Soviet Antarctic Expedition, 1960–61, and named Gora Osechka (misfire mountain).
