= Sjøneset Spur =

Rock spur in Antarctica

Sjøneset Spur (71°17′S 13°35′E) is a prominent rock spur from the Gruber Mountains, extending north along the east side of Anuchin Glacier to Lake Ober-See, in the Wohlthat Mountains of Queen Maud Land. It was discovered and plotted from air photos by the German Antarctic Expedition of 1938–39, and replotted from air photos and surveys by the Norwegian Antarctic Expedition, 1956–60, and named Sjøneset ("the lake cape").
