= Mount Seekopf =

Mountain in Queen Maud Land, Antarctica

Mount Seekopf (71°17′S 13°42′E) is a peak (1,300 m) surmounting the east side of Lake Ober-See in the Gruber Mountains of Queen Maud Land, Antarctica. It was discovered and given the descriptive name Seekopf (lake peak) by the German Antarctic Expedition, 1938–39, under Alfred Ritscher.
