= Lake Ober-See =

Lake in Antarctica

- Location of Lake Obersee in Antarctica
- Location: Queen Maud Land, Antarctica
- Coordinates: 71°17′S 13°39′E
- Type: glacial
- Etymology: "Upper Lake" (from German "ober" [lower] + "see" [lake])
- Basin countries: (Antarctica)
- Surface area: 3.4 square kilometres (1.3 mi^{2})
- Frozen: Permanently

Lake Ober-See (German: Obersee, 'Upper Lake') is a permanently-frozen glacial meltwater lake lying between Sjøneset Spur and Mount Seekopf in the Gruber Mountains of Queen Maud Land, Antarctica. The lake was discovered by the German Antarctic Expedition under Alfred Ritscher, 1938–39.

Lake Ober-See is located a few kilometers northeast of Lake Untersee (German: Untersee, "Lower Lake"), a larger lake but similar in most respects to Lake Ober-See, and the best-studied lake in the region. Divers have dived into Lake Ober-See to study its microbial communities.
