= Antarctica during World War II =

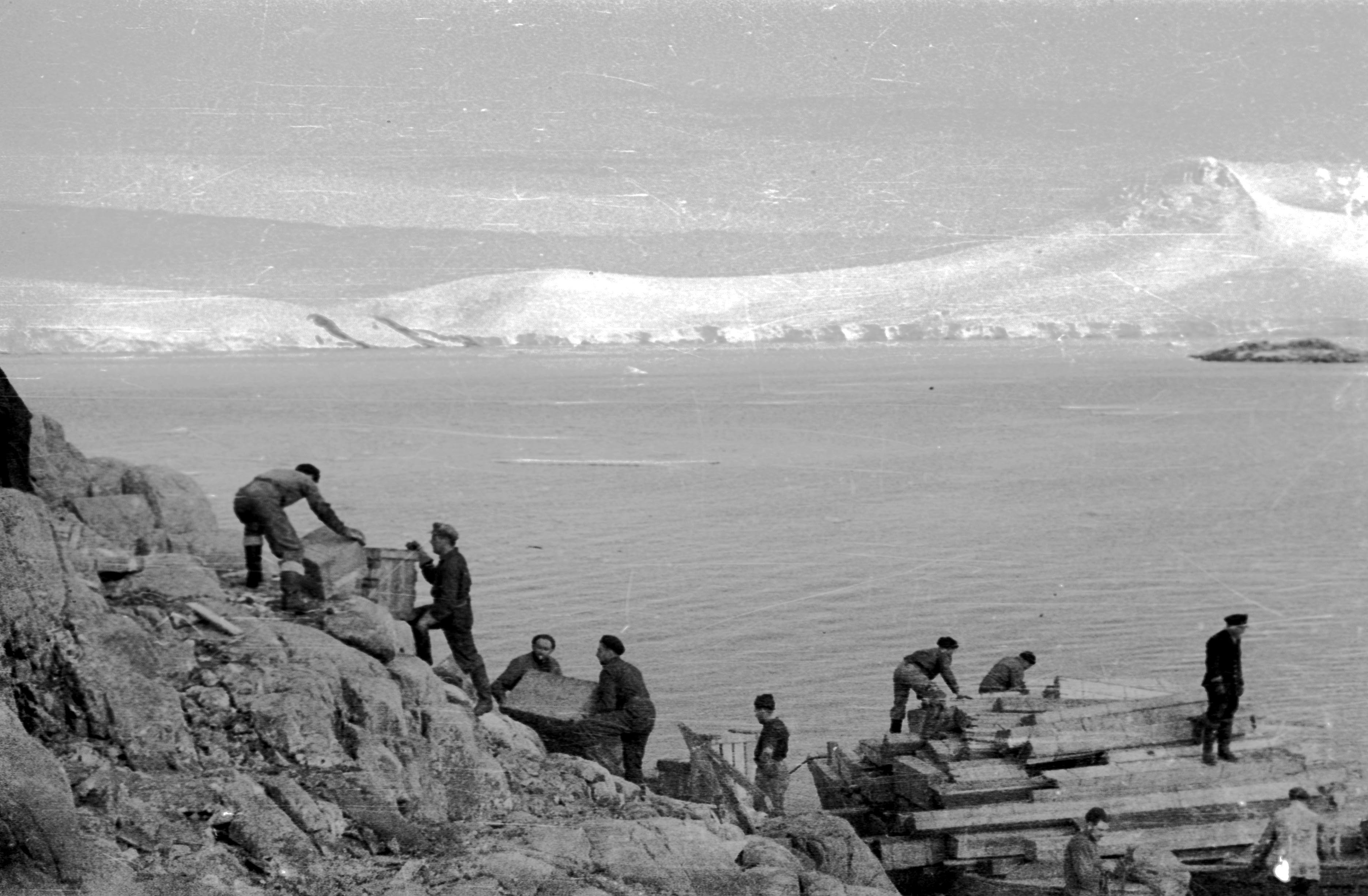
Personnel of Operation Tabarin unload supplies at Port Lockroy, 1944.

International competition extended to the continent of Antarctica during the World War II era, though the region saw no combat. During the prelude to war, Nazi Germany organised the 1938 Third German Antarctic Expedition to preempt Norway's claim to Queen Maud Land. The expedition served as the basis for a new German claim, called New Swabia. A year later, the United States Antarctic Service Expedition established two bases, which operated for two years before being abandoned. Responding to these encroachments, and taking advantage of Europe's wartime turmoil, the nearby nations of Chile and Argentina made their own claims. In 1940 Chile proclaimed the Chilean Antarctic Territory in areas already claimed by Britain, while Argentina (who already had a permanent establishment since 1904) proclaimed Argentine Antarctica in 1943 in an overlapping area.

In response to the activities of Germany, Chile, Argentina, and the United States, Britain launched Operation Tabarin in 1943. Its objective was to establish a permanent presence and assert Britain's claim to the Falkland Islands Dependencies, as well as to deny use of the area to the Kriegsmarine, which was known to use remote islands as rendezvous points. There was also a fear that Japan might attempt to seize the Falkland Islands. The expedition under Lieutenant James Marr left the Falklands on 29 January 1944. Bases were established on Deception Island, the coast of Graham Land, and at Hope Bay. The research begun by Operation Tabarin continued in subsequent years, ultimately becoming the British Antarctic Survey.

In the postwar period, competition continued among Antarctica's claimant powers, as well as the United States and Soviet Union. In the late 1950s, this competition would give way to a cooperative international framework with the International Geophysical Year and the Antarctic Treaty.

== Third German Antarctic Expedition and New Swabia (1938–1939) ==
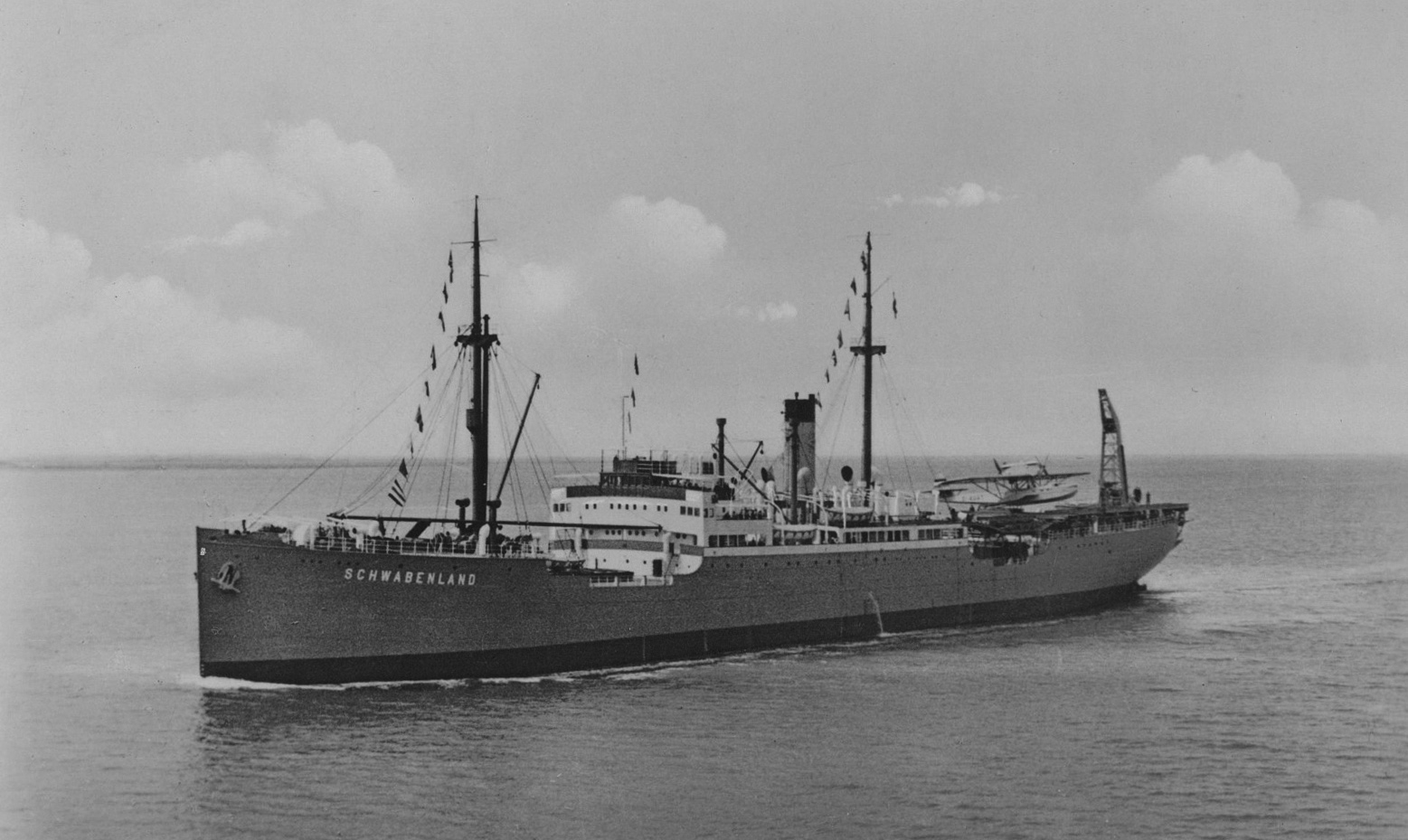
The MS Schwabenland, circa 1938

New Swabia was an area of land claimed by Nazi Germany in the Norwegian Queen Maud Land claim. It was explored in 1939 by the crew of the MS Schwabenland of the Third German Antarctic Expedition who set out secretly on 17 December 1938 from Hamburg with the goal of establishing a German whaling base in Antarctica for the newly made German whaling fleet. This was part of Hitler's attempt to create a production of fat from raw materials such as whale oil and to prevent having to rely on fat imports from Norway. The expedition was led by Capt. Alfred Ritscher who had previous experience in polar expeditions. The ship landed at the Princess Martha Coast on 19 January 1939 where research soon began after the team constructed a temporary base. They planted German flags on the coast line and surveyed the area where they recorded claim reservations at significant locations along the coast. The MS Schwabenland brought along two Dornier Wal seaplanes that took fifteen total photographic survey flights with 16,000 aerial photographs taken of the Neuschwabenland area. After the expedition left Antarctica on 6 February 1939 they returned to Hamburg on 11 April 1939. Nazi Germany never developed any type of permanent settlement in Antarctica and forfeited its claim to the New Swabia area in 1945 after its defeat in the Second World War.

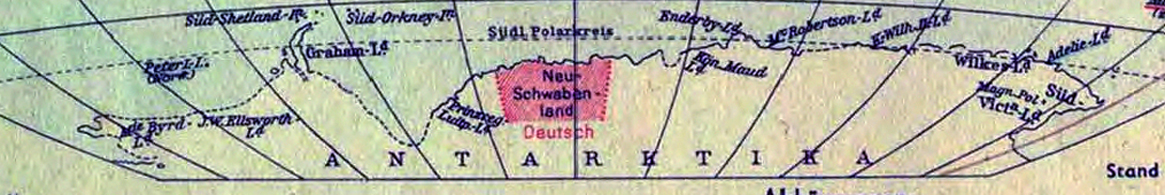
German map of the Neuschwabenland area (1941)

== United States Antarctic Service Expedition (1939–1941) ==
The United States Antarctic Service Expedition was the first government funded Antarctic expedition since the United States Exploring Expedition (1838–1842) and was led by Richard E. Byrd, a famous polar explorer renowned for previous Antarctic expeditions. The Third German Antarctic Expedition (1938–1939) created a sense of urgency for the U.S. government to establish permanent settlement in Antarctica. Commissioned by President Franklin D. Roosevelt in 1939, Richard.E Byrd supplied much of the equipment which was designated for use in his own planned privately funded expedition. The expedition was hastily planned with Byrd being given only 4 months to plan. The expedition begun in late 1939 when 125 men departed on the ships Bear of Oakland and the USMS North Star. Per Roosevelt's 25 November 1939 orders, the goal of the expedition was to construct and maintain two bases, West Base near King Edward VII Land and East Base near Charcot Island. They were also tasked with mapping the features of Heard Island as well as the James W. Ellsworth and Marie Byrd area, along with the coast line of meridians between 72 degrees and 148 degrees West. The team succeeded in building both East Base and West Base with East Base being used again during the Ronne Antarctic Research Expedition.

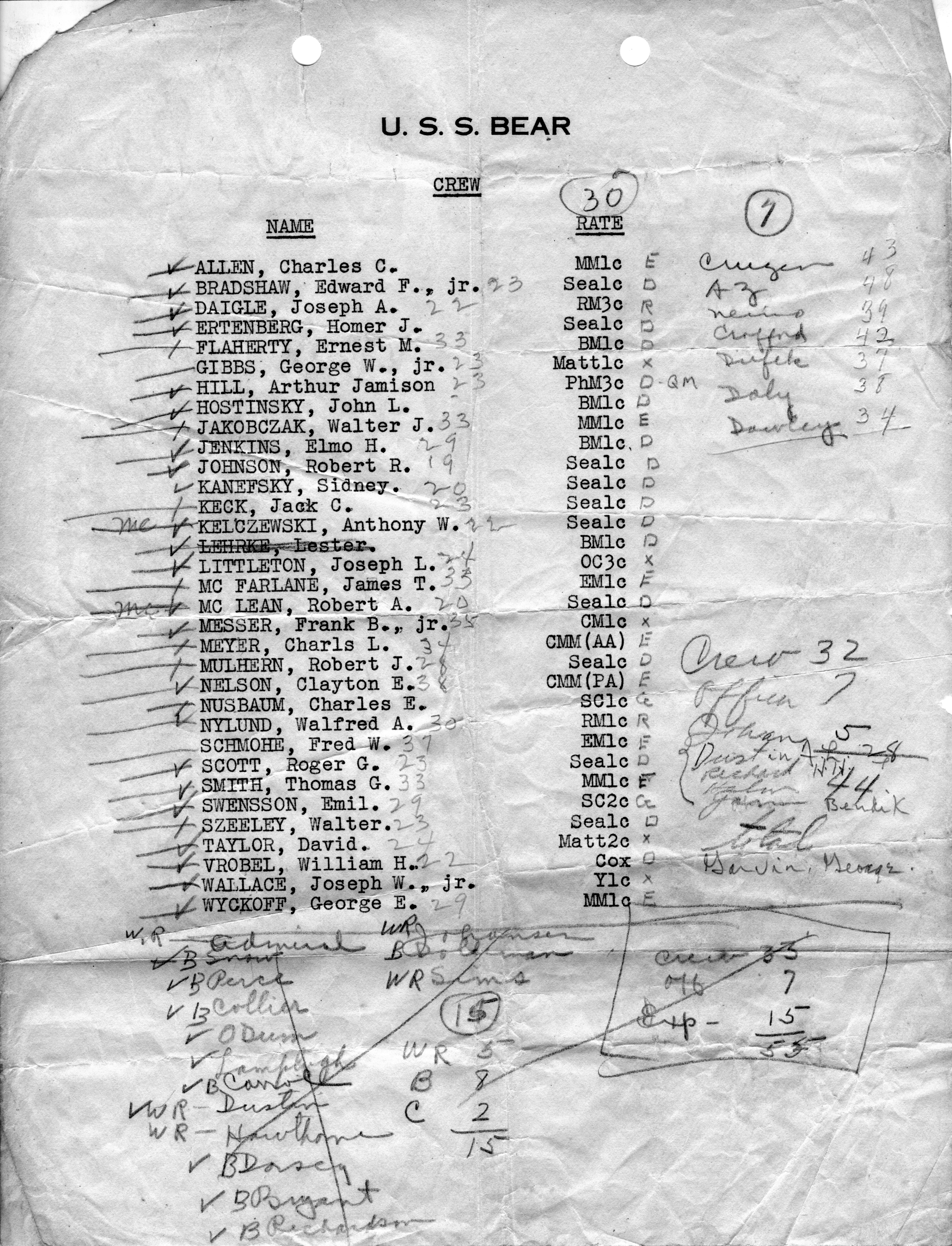
List of Bear of Oakland crew members for the 1939–1941 expedition led by Richard E, Byrd

The Team brought along a newly designed Antarctic Snow Cruiser which had smooth treadless tires which made it difficult to grip onto the Antarctic ice. Due to this problem and constant repair and maintenance on the tires, the vehicle was abandoned when the expedition team evacuated. It was found years later during Operation Highjump and once more in 1958. It is now suspected to be lost to the sea or buried under mounds of ice and snow. The crew of the mission, which included Richard Black and Paul Siple, conducted multiple experiments and observations including collecting samples of plants, algae, and lichen. The mission resulted in a better understanding of polar science. With World War II ramping up, the U.S. government deemed it wise to evacuate the two bases. West Base cleared on 1 February 1941, and East Base followed suite on 22 March 1941. The ships USMS North Star and Bear of Oakland arrived on 5 May 1941 and 18 May 1941, respectively.

== German Pacific Commerce Raiders (1940–1943) ==
During World War II, Nazi Germany constructed a commerce-raiding fleet of Auxiliary Merchant Cruisers destined to sail through the Pacific and disrupt Allied shipping. The main goal of these raiders was to destroy and capture enemy shipping. The Germans constructed 9 ships which were merchant ships that were converted to armed raiders with 5.9 inch guns and torpedo tubes. They were often disguised as neutral vessels.

While the ships mainly spent time in warmer waters near Asia many did stray into colder waters. The Atlantis for example stopped at the Kerguelen Islands in December 1940 to rest and resupply on water and food. The ship suffered its first wartime casualty when they lost Bernhard Herrmann after an accident on Christmas Eve. Many of the raiders used the islands as a stopping ground to swap disguises and refuel. The cruiser Pinguin captured a fleet of Norwegian fishers on 14 January 1941 near South Georgia.

In November 1941, the Australian government dispatched HMAS Australia to the Kerguelen Islands in response to concerns that the German or Japanese navies might use the archipelago as a base for Indian Ocean operations. The ship laid four mines between the two major harbours on the islands as a preventative measure.

German presence in the Pacific dwindled until the last raider, the Michel, was torpedoed and sunk by the submarine USS Tarpon off Yokohama on 16 October 1943.

== Argentine expeditions (1942 and 1943) ==
Argentina conducted two expeditions during the Second World War. The first occurred in late 1942, the second in February 1943.

=== 1942 expedition ===
The first expedition happened in 1942 when the ship Primero De Mayo captained by Alberto J. Oddera landed on Deception Island where surveying was conducted. Following the surveying the crew of the expedition planted a flag to claim the area for Argentina.

=== 1943 expedition ===
The 1943 expedition occurred in February following the removal of the previous expedition's flag by MV Carnarvon Castle. The expedition was largely uneventful with little activity besides photographic surveys of the Port Lockroy area.

== Operation Tabarin (1943–1946) ==
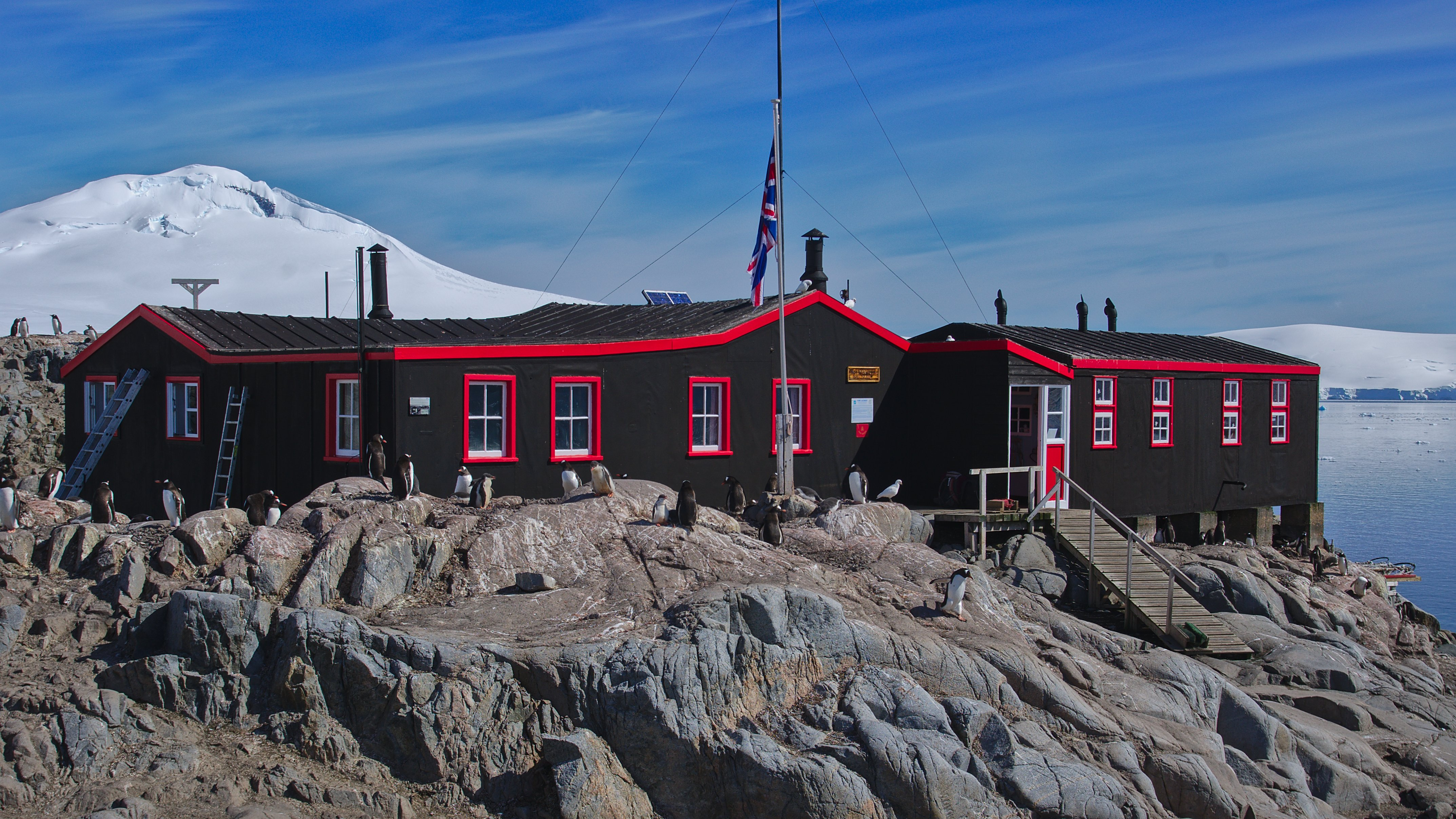
Station A, Port Lockroy. Currently preserved as a museum.

Operation Tabarin was a secret mission undertaken by the British that started in 1943 and ended in 1946. Its original purpose was to set up bases in Graham Land but Lieutenant Commander James Marr with the help of a Discovery Committee decided to extend its reach to surveying and other scientific research. It began with the pretense of searching Antarctica's seas for Nazi U-boats and other German shipping threats but was actually a cover for the construction of bases in disputed territory which was claimed by Argentina. Led by James Marr, who had previous polar experience, the mission team landed at Port Foster, Deception Island on 6 February 1944 after departing from Avonmouth on 14 December 1943. Halfway through the voyage the expedition force switched ships to the Fitzroy and William Scoresby captained by Victor Marchesi. They found no Argentine presence upon landing with the exception of a fuel tank with a painted Argentine flag. They quickly established camp at an old Norwegian whaling station raising the Union flag and set up Base B as a science station.

The rest of the expedition team left for Hope Bay to set up Base A on 7 February 1944. Due to heavy weather conditions the Fitzroy and William Scoresby left on 10 February 1944 and set up camp at Port Lockroy. The two ships departed to the Falklands after completing the main hut at Port Lockroy on 17 February 1944. The postal office was completed 23 March 1944 after William Scoresby returned with more crew although it later burned down on 23 April 1944. Survey work began in May not long after the world was alerted of the expedition's existence. Elke Mackenzie Lamb, a leading scientist in the crew, collected samples of lichen, worms, sea urchins and sponges.

In February 1945 Fitzroy, William Scorresby and the Eagle arrived at Stations A and B with additional scientists. Once there crew and equipment were loaded on to the Fitzroy and William Scoresby and were sent to Hope Bay to construct Station D while others sent to Stonington Island to begin work on Station E were moved out on the Eagle. Construction of Station E was abandoned after James Marr resigned for health reasons on 7 February. His successor Andrew Taylor shifted focus to Station D at Seal Point where the base was finished on 20 March 1945. After building a hut on Coronation Island the British visited Argentina's Meteorology base on Laurie Island. The British began three sledging expeditions to the smaller islands in the area such as Duse Point and Vortex Island starting in August 1945 and concluding in December 1945 after the team returned to Station D for the final time. The team came back with samples of rocks, lichens, fossils and scientific data and chart improvements. The expedition finished at the start of 1946 when on 14 January 1946 departure of crew began and concluded on 11 February 1946 when all military crew members departed for home. The mission resulted in an expansion of British land claims on the continent and further scientific research. Station A at Port Lockroy is now preserved as a museum. Operation Tabarin was followed by the Falkland Islands Dependencies Survey.

== Secret Nazi bunker ==
Throughout the years, rumours of a hidden German base in the Antarctic have persisted, stemming from theories of escaped Nazi leaders and the appearance of a U-boat in July 1945. The theory was set forward by the Hungarian Ladislas Szabo, who set forth the idea in 1947. Many noted scientists such as Colin Summerhayes have disproved these theories in peer-reviewed papers. They prove through declassified documents that the Nazi regime was present in Antarctica for only a month in 1939 on a simple surveying expedition which left little time to build a city-sized structure in the ice.
