= Barkley Mountains =

Mountain range in Antarctica

The Barkley Mountains (72°22′S 1°0′E) are a small group of mountains including Kvitkjolen Ridge and Isingen Mountain, rising between Kvitsvodene Valley and Rogstad Glacier in the Sverdrup Mountains of Queen Maud Land. They were discovered by the Third German Antarctic Expedition under Alfred Ritscher, 1938–39, and named for Erich Barkley, biologist on the expedition. They were surveyed by the Norwegian-British-Swedish Antarctic Expedition, 1949–52.
