= Todt Ridge =

Todt Ridge (71°22′S 13°57′E) is a partially snow-covered ridge, 3 nautical miles (6 km) long, lying 5 nautical miles (9 km) east of Mount Mentzel at the east end of the Gruber Mountains of Queen Maud Land. Discovered by the German Antarctic Expedition, 1938–39, under Captain Alfred Ritscher. Named for Herbert Todt, an assistant to Ritscher who served as home secretary for the expedition.
