= List of theaters and campaigns of World War II =

The List of theatres and campaigns of World War II subdivides military operations of World War II and contemporary wars by war, then by theater and then by campaign.

== Pre–World War II ==
=== Asia ===
- Japanese invasion of Manchuria (September 18, 1931 – February 26, 1932)
- January 28 incident (January 28 – March 3, 1932)
- Defense of the Great Wall (January 1 – May 31, 1933)
- Action in Inner Mongolia (May 26 – October, 1933)
- Suiyuan campaign (October – November 1936)
- Soviet-Japanese Border War (May 11 – September 16, 1939)
- Second Sino-Japanese War (July 7, 1937 – December 7, 1941)

=== Europe and Africa ===
- July Putsch (July 25–30, 1934)
- Sudeten German uprising (September–October 1938)
- Second Italo-Abyssinian War (October 3, 1935 – February 19, 1937)
- Spanish Civil War (July 17, 1936 – April 1, 1939)
- S-Plan (January 16, 1939 – March 1940)
- Hungarian invasion of Carpatho-Ukraine (March 14–18, 1939)
- Slovak-Hungarian War (March 23 – 31, 1939)
- Italian invasion of Albania (April 7–12, 1939)

== Campaigns ==
=== European Theatre ===
==== Invasion of Poland ====
- Fall Weiss
- Soviet invasion of Poland

==== Nordic Front ====
- List of military operations in the Nordic countries during World War II
- Invasion of Denmark and Norway (April–June 1940)
- Continuation War (June 25, 1941 – September 19, 1944)
- Lapland War (October 1, 1944 – April 25, 1945)
- Liberation of Finnmark (October 23, 1944 – April 26, 1945)

==== Western Front ====
- Phoney War (Oct 1939 – April 1940)
- Battle of France (with Benelux countries/Fall Gelb) (May–June 1940)
- Battle of Britain (+ Operation Sea Lion Unternehmen Seelöwe) (July–October 1940)
- Western Front (1944–1945)
  - Supreme Headquarters Allied Expeditionary Force (SHAEF) commanded Allied forces in north west Europe, from late 1943 until May 1945.
  - Battle of Normandy (June–August 1944)
  - Northern France Campaign (July–September 1944)
  - Southern France Campaign (Operation Dragoon) (August–September 1944)
  - Battle of the Siegfried Line (Rhineland Campaign, Ardennes-Alsace Campaign) (August–December 1944)
  - Central Europe Campaign (October 1, 1944 – April 25, 1945)

==== Eastern Front ====
- Eastern Front (initially Operation Barbarossa) (June 1941 to May 1945)
- Continuation War (June 1941 – September 1944)
- Lapland War (September 1944 – April 1945)

=== Mediterranean and Middle East Theatre ===
- Allied Force Headquarters (AFHQ), controlled all forces in the Mediterranean Theatre late 1942 to May 1945.
- Gibraltar (9 September 1939 – 28 May 1944)
- Adriatic Sea (7 April 1939 – 15 May 1945)
- Palestine (June 1940 – June 1941)
- East Africa (10 June 1940 – 27 November 1941)
- North Africa (10 June 1940 – 13 May 1943)
  - Western Desert (11 June 1940 – 4 February 1943)
  - French North Africa (8–16 November 1942)
  - Tunisia (17 November 1942 – 13 May 1943)
- Malta (11 June 1940 – 20 November 1942)
- Bahrain (19 October 1940)
- Greco-Italian War (28 October 1940 to April 1941)
- Invasion of Yugoslavia (Operation Punishment) (April 1941)
- Battle of Greece (Operation Marita) (April 1941)
- Crete (Operation Mercury) (May–June 1941)
- World War II in Yugoslavia (April 1941 to May 1945)
- Iraq (2–31 May 1941)
- Syria-Lebanon (8 June – 14 July 1941)
- Iran (25–31 August 1941)
- Sicily (9 July – 17 August 1943)
- Italy (10 July 1943 – 2 May 1945)
  - Italian Civil War (September 8, 1943 - May 2, 1945)
- Corsica (August 1943)
- Dodecanese (8 September – 22 November 1943)
- Southern France (15 August – 14 September 1944)
- Alpes-Maritimes (23 March – 2 May 1945)

=== Pacific-Asian Theatre ===
- Second Sino-Japanese War (December 8, 1941 – September 9, 1945)
- Pacific War
- American-British-Dutch-Australian Command
- Pacific Theater of Operations
  - Pacific Ocean Areas
  - South West Pacific Area
- South-East Asian Theatre
  - Burma Campaign
  - China Burma India Theatre
- Japan
  - Volcano and Ryukyu Islands campaign
- Soviet-Japanese War (1945)
  - Soviet Manchurian Campaign (1945)

=== Other theatres ===
- Americas
- Australia
- Arctic and Antarctica
- West Africa (1940)
- Madagascar (1942)

=== Naval wars ===
- Battle of the Atlantic
  - Arctic Convoys (Operation Rösselsprung)
- Battle of the Mediterranean
- Battle of the Indian Ocean

=== Air wars ===
- Battle of Britain
- Strategic bombing during World War II
- Atomic bombings of Hiroshima and Nagasaki

== Contemporary wars ==
- Chinese Civil War (April 12, 1927 – May 1, 1950)
- Second Sino-Japanese War (July 7, 1937 – December 7, 1941)
- S-Plan (January 16, 1939 – March, 1940)
- Soviet–Japanese border conflicts (May 11, 1939 – September 16, 1939)
- Winter War (November 1939 – March 1940)
- Franco-Thai War (September 1, 1940 – May 9, 1941)
- Ecuadorian–Peruvian War (July 5, 1941 – January 31, 1942)
- Northern Campaign (September 2, 1942 – December, 1944)
- Afghan tribal revolts (February 1944 – January 11, 1947)
- Greek Civil War (December 3, 1944 – October 16, 1949)

== See also ==
- List of World War II battles
- Battles and operations of World War II
  - Campaigns of World War II
  - Military operations of World War II
- World War II-related lists
