= MS Schwabenland =

Two motor ships have borne the name Schwabenland, after the Swabia region in Germany:

- MS Schwabenland (1925) was a 7,894-ton German cargo ship completed as Schwarzenfels in July 1925, by Deutsche Werke in Kiel, Germany. Rebuilt as seaplane tender and renamed Schwabenland in 1933. Scuttled with a cargo of gas munitions in the Skagerrak on 31 December 1946.
- MS Schwabenland (1983) was a 3,982-ton German cargo ship launched on 8 October 1983, by Zhonghua in Shanghai, China. Sold in 1985 and renamed Ganges Pioneer, in 1986 and renamed Bumi Pertiwi, in 1988 and renamed Schwabenland once again, in 1988 and renamed Alkaid, in 1989 and renamed Scandutch Orient, in 1990 and renamed Pul Aman, in 1991 and renamed Alkaid, in 1997 and renamed Builder Pioneer, in 1998 and renamed Tiger Star, in 1999 and renamed Tiger Spring, in 2000 and renamed Confidence and in 2001 and renamed Tiger Spring. As of 2007 the ship was still in service.
