= Klevekampen Mountain =

Mountain in Queen Maud Land, Antarctica

Klevekampen Mountain (71°58′S 7°41′E) is a large, mainly ice-free mountain 3 nautical miles (6 km) east of Kubus Mountain in the Filchner Mountains of Queen Maud Land, Antarctica. It was plotted from air photos by the Third German Antarctic Expedition (1938–39), was mapped from surveys and air photos by the Sixth Norwegian Antarctic Expedition (1956–60) and named Klevekampen (the closet crag). Aurkleven Cirque lies between Klevekampen and Kubus.
