= Herrmann Mountains =

Mountain range in Antarctica

The Herrmann Mountains (72°33′S 0°30′E), known in German as the Herrmannberge, are a group of rocky elevations including the Hamrane Heights and the Roots Heights, rising between Reece Valley and Kvitsvodene Valley in the Sverdrup Mountains of Queen Maud Land, Antarctica. They were discovered by the Third German Antarctic Expedition under Alfred Ritscher, 1938–39, and named for Ernst Herrmann, the geographer of the expedition. They were surveyed by the Norwegian–British–Swedish Antarctic Expedition, 1949–52.
