= Mount Hedden =

Mountain in Antarctica

Mount Hedden (72°5′S 1°25′E) is a nunatak 1,515 metres (4,970 ft) high lying 1 nautical mile (2 km) north of Brattskarvet Mountain in the Sverdrup Mountains of Queen Maud Land, Antarctica. The name "Hedden-Berg" after Karl Hedden, a sailor with the expedition, was applied in the area by the Third German Antarctic Expedition (1938–39) under Alfred Ritscher. The correlation of the name with this nunatak may be arbitrary but is recommended for the sake of international uniformity and historical continuity.
