= Nordwestliche Insel Mountains =

Mountain range in Antarctica

- Location within Antarctica

Geography
- Continent: Antarctica
- Region: Queen Maud Land
- Range coordinates: 71°27′S 11°33′E

Nordwestliche Insel Mountains (71°27′S 11°33′E) is a small, detached group of mountains, island-like in appearance, and forming the northern extremity of the Humboldt Mountains, in the Wohlthat Mountains of Queen Maud Land, Antarctica. They lie at the northwest extremity of the Wohlthat Mountains.

== Discovery and naming ==
The Nordwestliche Insel Mountains were discovered by the German Antarctic Expedition (1938–1939) (GerAE) under Alfred Ritscher, and named Nordwestliche Insel (northwest island). The name Nordvestøya is used by Norway in the Norway Gazetteer. It is described there as being north of Humboldtfjella (Humboldt Mountains) in the northwest part of Wohlthatmassivet (Wohlthat Mountains) in Fimbulheimen.

== Nearby features ==
Nearby features include:

=== Arkticheskiy Institut Rocks ===
71°18′S 11°27′E. A group of rocks lying 8 nautical miles (15 km; 9.2 mi) north of Nordwestliche Insel Mountains. Discovered and photographed by the GerAE, 1938-39. Mapped by the Soviet Antarctic Expedition, 1960-61, and named for that nation's Arctic Institute.

=== Oskeladden Rock ===
71°18′S 11°27′E. Rock lying 0.9 nautical miles (1.7 km; 1.0 mi) south of Pål Rock in the Arkticheskiy Institut Rocks. Discovered and photographed by the GerAE, 1938-39. Mapped by Norway from air photos and surveys by the Sixth Norwegian Antarctic Expedition (NorAE), 1956-60, and named Oskeladden. (Note: "Oskeladden"' or "Askeladden" is a main character in a number of tales collected in Asbjørnsen and Moe's Norwegian Folktales.)

=== Pål Rock ===
71°18′S 11°26′E. Rock lying between Per and Oskeladden Rocks in the Arkticheskiy Institut Rocks. Discovered and photographed by the GerAE, 1938-39. Mapped by Norway from air photos and surveys by NorAE, 1956-60, and named Pål (Paul).

=== Per Rock ===
71°17′S 11°26′E. Rock lying 0.8 nautical miles (1.5 km; 0.92 mi) north of Pal Rock in the Arkticheskiy Institut Rocks. Discovered and photographed by the GerAE, 1938-39. Mapped by Norway from air photos and surveys by NorAE, 1956-60, and named Per (Peter).

=== Sphinx Mountain ===
71°27′S 11°58′E. A linear mountain, 1,850 metres (6,070 ft) high, trending in a north–south direction for 6 nautical miles (11 km; 6.9 mi), standing 5 nautical miles (9.3 km; 5.8 mi) east of Nordwestliche Insel Mountains. This mountain was discovered by the GerAE, 1938-39, who gave the name Sphinx to its northern peak. The name was extended to this mountain by NorAE, 1956-60, and the Soviet Antarctic Expedition, 1960-61, who referred to it as Sfinksen (the sphinx) and Gora Sfinks (sphinx mountain), respectively. The recommended spelling has been chosen to agree with the original German form.

=== Sphinxkopf Peak ===
71°25′S 11°57′E. The peak, 1,630 metres (5,350 ft) high, at the northern end of Sphinx Mountain. Discovered by the GerAE under Ritscher, 1938-39, who named it Sphinxkopf (sphinx head) because of its appearance.

== Sources ==
- Alberts, Fred G., ed. (1995), Geographic Names of the Antarctic (PDF) (2 ed.), United States Board on Geographic Names This article incorporates public domain material from websites or documents of the United States Board on Geographic Names.
- "Nordvestøya", SCAR Gazetteer, Scientific Committee on Antarctic Research
