= Ritscher Upland =

Coordinates: 73°0′S 9°0′W

Ritscher Upland (German: Ritscherhochland) is a large ice-covered upland of western Queen Maud Land, bounded by Kraul Mountains and Heimefront Range to the west and southwest, and by Borg Massif and Kirwan Escarpment to the east. It was discovered by the Third German Antarctic Expedition (1938–1939), and named for Capt. Alfred Ritscher, leader of the expedition. It was remapped from air photos taken by the Norwegian-British-Swedish Antarctic Expedition (NBSAE) (1949–1952), led by John Schjelderup Giæver.
