= Gockel Ridge =

Gockel Ridge (72°42′S 0°12′E) is a ridge extending from Alan Peak to Nupskapa Peak at the south end of the Sverdrup Mountains in Antarctica. The name "Gockelkamm" after Wilhelm Gockel, a meteorological assistant on the expedition, was given to a ridge in the area by the Third German Antarctic Expedition (1938–39) under Alfred Ritscher. The correlation of the name with this ridge may be arbitrary but is recommended for the sake of international uniformity and historical continuity.
