= Aurkleven Cirque =

Cirque in Antarctica

Coordinates: 71°58′S 7°31′E

Aurkleven Cirque is a large cirque, the bottom of which is partially covered with moraine, between Kubus Mountain and Klevekampen Mountain in the Filchner Mountains of Queen Maud Land. It was plotted from surveys and from air photos by the Sixth Norwegian Antarctic Expedition (1956–60) and named "Aurkleven" ("the gravel closet").
