= Veststraumen Glacier =

Glacier in Antarctica

- Location of Queen Maud Land in Antarctica

- Location within Antarctica
- Location: Queen Maud Land
- Coordinates: 74°15′S 15°00′E
- Length: 45 nmi (83 km; 52 mi)
- Thickness: unknown
- Terminus: Riiser-Larsen Ice Shelf
- Status: unknown

Veststraumen Glacier (74°15′S 15°0′W) is a glacier about 45 miles (72 kilometres) long draining west along the south end of Kraul Mountains into Riiser-Larsen Ice Shelf. The glacier was seen in the course of a U.S. Navy LC-130 plane flight over the coast on November 5, 1967, and was plotted by the United States Geological Survey (USGS) from photographs obtained at that time. In 1969, the Advisory Committee on Antarctic Names (US-ACAN) gave the name "Endurance Glacier" to this feature (in remembrance of the ill-fated voyage of the Endurance in this part of Weddell Sea in 1915), but that naming was rescinded because UK Antarctic Place-Names Committee (UK-APC) gave the identical name to a small glacier on Elephant Island. The descriptive name "Veststraumen" (the west stream) appears on a 1972 Norsk Polarinstitutt map.

== See also ==
- List of glaciers in the Antarctic
- Glaciology
