= Stein Nunataks =

Stein Nunataks (71°36′S 1°15′W) is a group of nunataks about 15 nautical miles (28 km) east of Witte Peaks on the northeast part of Ahlmann Ridge, in Queen Maud Land. Discovered by the German Antarctic Expedition under Ritscher, 1938–39, and named for Willy Stein, boatswain of the expedition. They were surveyed by the Norwegian-British-Swedish Antarctic Expedition (NBSAE), between 1949 and 1952.
