= Gburek Peaks =

Mountain in Antarctica

The Gburek Peaks (72°11′S 0°15′W) are a group of rocky elevations including Straumsvola Mountain and Jutulrora Mountain, forming the western end of the Sverdrup Mountains in Queen Maud Land, Antarctica. They were discovered by the Third German Antarctic Expedition under Alfred Ritscher, 1938–39, and named for Leo Gburek, geophysicist on the expedition. The name Gburek is here restricted to the westernmost peaks of those so named on maps of the German Expedition, these being clearly recognizable on detailed maps by the Norwegian–British–Swedish Antarctic Expedition, 1949–52, and subsequent Norwegian expeditions.
