= Leo Gburek =

German geophysicist (1910–1941)

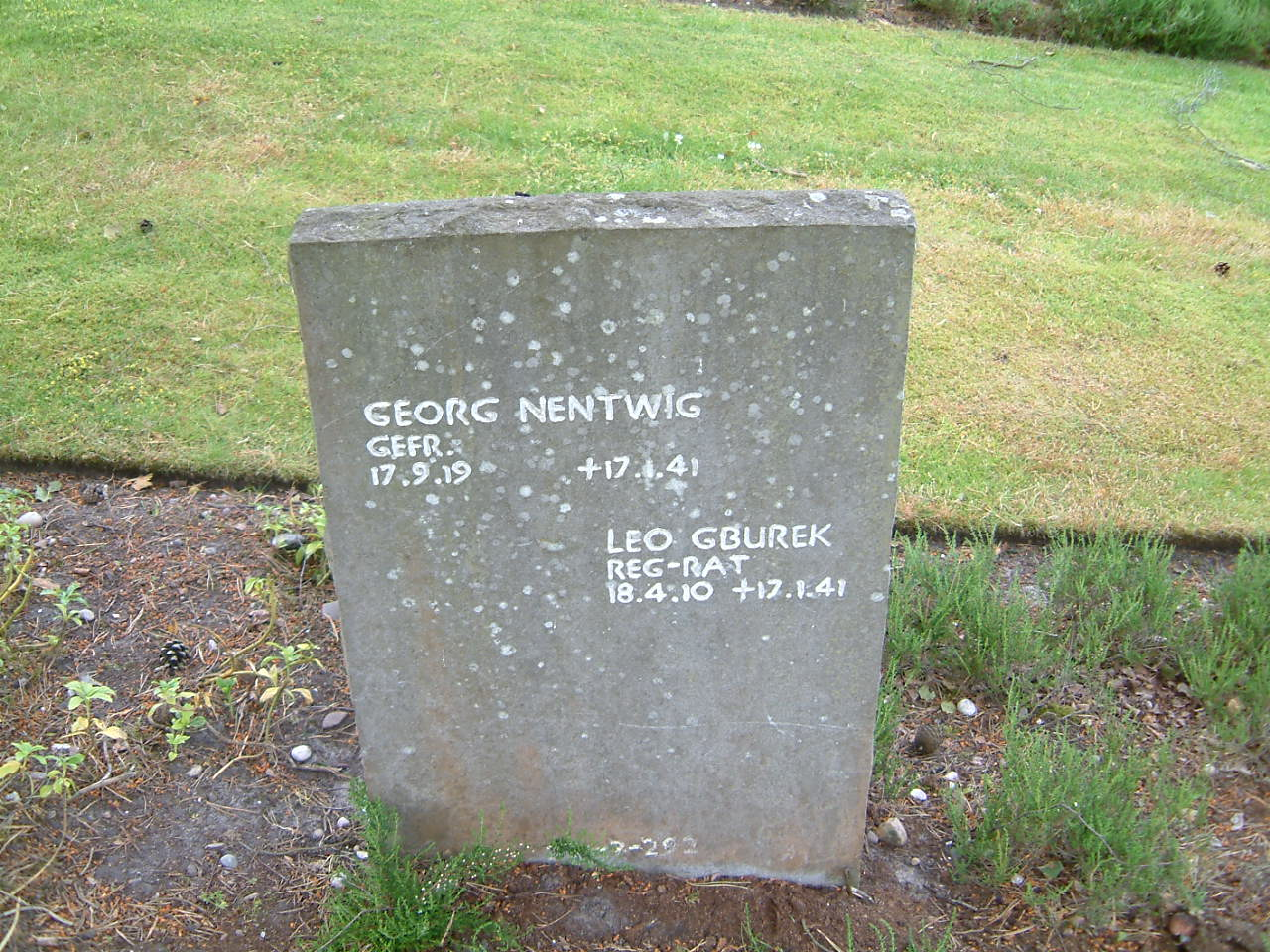
- Graves of Georg Nentwig (1919–1941) and Leo Gburek (1910–1941)

Personal details
- Born: 18 April 1910 Bismarckhütte, German Empire
- Died: 17 January 1941 (aged 30) Fair Isle, Shetland, United Kingdom
- Resting place: Cannock Chase German Military Cemetery

Military service
- Allegiance: Nazi Germany
- Branch/service: Luftwaffe
- Battles/wars: World War II

Leo Gburek (18 April 1910 in Bismarckhütte – 17 January 1941 in Fair Isle, Shetland) was a German geophysicist and a member of the Third German Antarctic Expedition 1938/39.

== Life ==
Leo Gburek attended the Volksschule and Oberrealschule in Beuthen. In 1929, he began a study of geophysics at the University of Leipzig. In the summers of 1937 and 1938, he took part in expeditions to Spitsbergen, where he undertook geomagnetic surveys. There he met Ernst Herrmann, who was also a member of the third German Antarctic Expedition led by Alfred Ritscher. Due to his polar experience Gburek was selected in October 1938 to join this expedition. His responsibilities included geomagnetic measurements on the Antarctic continent. A group of rocky elevations on the ice sheet was named by the expedition leader Gburekspitzen (Gburek Peaks).

At the beginning of World War II Gburek was conscripted and served as a weather observer in the Luftwaffe in weather reconnaissance squadron Wekusta 1 / Ob.dL. In January 1941, his plane was shot down over the Shetland Islands during a reconnaissance flight and he was killed, aged 30, during the crash landing at Vaasetter, Fair Isle. He was buried on 20 January 1941, in the cemetery of Fair Isle but, along with his colleague Georg Nentwig who also died in the crash, he was later reburied at the Cannock Chase German Military Cemetery, Staffordshire, England.

== Publications ==
- "Geophysikalischer Arbeitsbericht". In: Vorbericht über die Deutsche Antarktische Expedition 1938/39. Annalen der Hydrographie und Maritimen Meteorologie VIII (1939), Beiheft, S. 21–23.
- "Erdmagnetische Messungen, Eisuntersuchungen, Strahlungsmessungen und Kernzählungen". In: A. Ritscher (Hrsg.) Deutsche Antarktische Expedition 1938/39. Wissenschaftliche und fliegerische Ergebnisse. Band 2, Mundus, Hamburg 1954–1958, S. 97–100.
