= Mount Dallmann =

Mountain in Antarctica

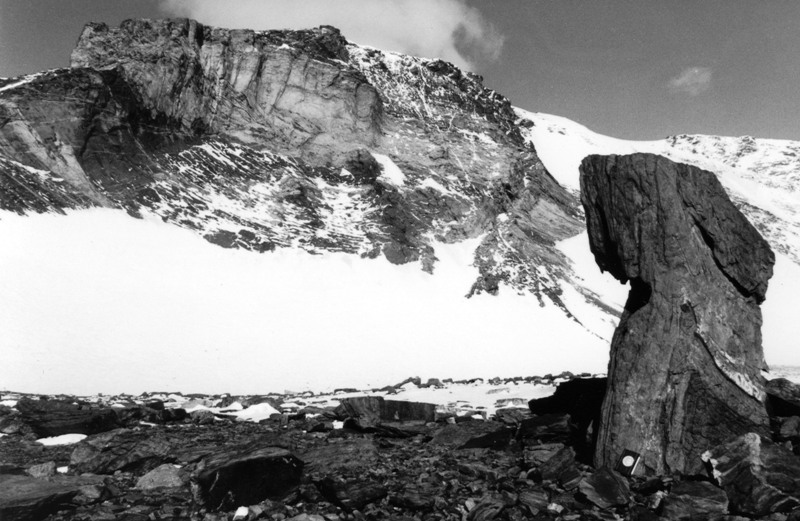
- Mount Dallmann, view in SW direction.

Highest point
- Elevation: 2,485 m (8,153 ft)
- Coordinates: 71°45′S 10°18′E

Geography
- Location within Antarctica
- Location: Queen Maud Land, East Antarctica
- Parent range: Orvin Mountains

Mount Dallmann is a prominent mountain, 2,485 metres (8,150 ft) high, 18 kilometres (11 mi) east of the northern portion of the Conrad Mountains, in the Orvin Mountains of Queen Maud Land, Antarctica. It was discovered by the Third German Antarctic Expedition (1938–1939), led by Captain Alfred Ritscher, and named for Eduard Dallmann, a German whaling captain who explored along the west coast of the Antarctic Peninsula in 1873–1874. Dallmann was the first person to navigate under the German flag in Antarctic waters.

== See also ==
- List of mountains of Queen Maud Land
- Slabotnen Cirque
