= Lev Rukhin =

Soviet geologist

- Born: 29 October [O.S. 16 October] 1912; Moscow
- Died: September 8, 1959 (aged 46); Leningrad
- Education: Saint Petersburg State University
- Scientific career
- Fields: Geology

Lev Rukhin (Russian: Рухин Лев Борисович; 29 October [O.S. 16 October] 1912 in Moscow – 8 September 1959 in Leningrad) was a Soviet geologist. Doctor of Geological and Mineralogical Sciences (1944), professor of Saint Petersburg State University since 1945. A member of the Communist Party of the Soviet Union from 1941.

== Biography ==
He was born in Moscow. He graduated from Leningrad State University (1933). Major works are devoted to the lithology and paleogeography. He was one of the first to use statistical methods in studying sedimentary rocks. He was awarded the "Badge of Honor" and medals.

== Works ==
- (in Russian) Основы общей палеогеографии, Л., 1959.
