= Schirmacher Ponds =

Meltwater ponds in Antarctica

Schirmacher Ponds (70°45′S 11°40′E) is a group of meltwater ponds scattered among the Schirmacher Hills, lying 40 nautical miles (70 km) north of the Humboldt Mountains, along the coast of Queen Maud Land. Discovered by the German Antarctic Expedition under Ritscher, 1938–39, and named for Richardheinrich Schirmacher, pilot of the Boreas, one of the expedition seaplanes.
