= Kraul Mountains =

Mountain range in Queen Maud Land, Antarctica

- Kraulberge
- Location within Antarctica

Highest point
- Coordinates: 73°20′S 14°10′W

Naming
- Etymology: named for Captain Otto Kraul
- Language of name: German

Geography
- Location: Queen Maud Land

The Kraul Mountains (German: Kraulberge) are a chain of mountains and nunataks that trend northeastward from Veststraumen Glacier for approximately 70 nautical miles (130 km) in western Queen Maud Land, Antarctica. They were discovered by the Third German Antarctic Expedition (1938–1939), led by Captain Alfred Ritscher, and named for Captain Otto Kraul, ice pilot of the expedition.
