= Steinmulen Shoulder =

Rock shoulder in Antarctica

Steinmulen Shoulder (71°18′S 13°25′E) is a rock shoulder extending north from Mount Zimmermann in the Gruber Mountains of the Wohlthat Mountains, Queen Maud Land. Discovered and plotted from air photos by German Antarctic Expedition, 1938–39. Replotted from air photos and surveys by Norwegian Antarctic Expedition, 1956–60, and named Steinmulen (the stone snout).
