= Mount Ruhnke =

Mountain in Antarctica

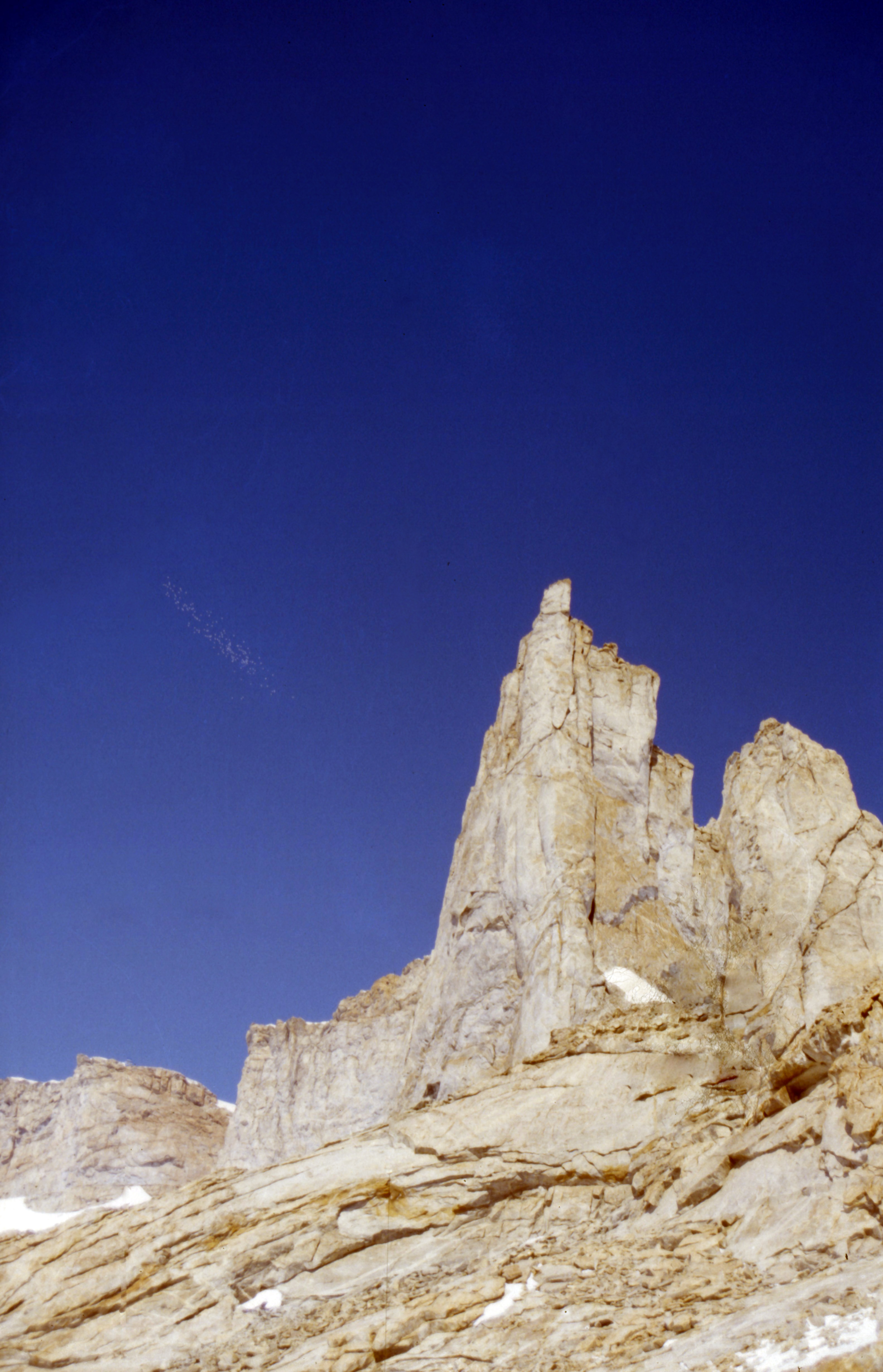
Mount Ruhnke

Mount Ruhnke (72°5′S 3°38′E) is a peak (2,535 m) in the northwest part of Festninga Mountain in the Muhlig-Hofmann Mountains of Queen Maud Land. The name Ruhnkeberg was applied in the general area by the German Antarctic Expedition under Ritscher, 1938–39, for Herbert Ruhnke, radio operator on the flying boat Passat used by this expedition. The correlation of the name with this feature may be arbitrary but is recommended for the sake of international uniformity and historical continuity.
