= Witte Peaks =

Mountains in Queen Maud Land, Antarctica

Witte Peaks (71°32′S 2°4′W) is a line of about four nunataks trending SW-NE, rising 15 nautical miles (28 km) west of Stein Nunataks on the north part of Ahlmann Ridge in Queen Maud Land. Discovered by the German Antarctic Expedition under Ritscher, 1938–39, and named for Dietrich Witte, motor mechanic on the expedition. Surveyed by Norwegian-British-Swedish Antarctic Expedition (NBSAE), 1949–52.
