= Kubus Mountain =

Mountain in Queen Maud Land, Antarctica

Kubus Mountain (71°59′S 7°21′E) is a distinctive blocky mountain, rising to 2,985 metres (9,790 ft) 3 nautical miles (6 km) southeast of Trollslottet Mountain, in the northwestern part of the Filchner Mountains of Queen Maud Land, Antarctica. It was discovered by the Third German Antarctic Expedition under Ritscher, 1938–39, and given the descriptive name Kubus (the cube). Aurkleven Cirque lies between Klevekampen and Kubus.
