= Penck Glacier =

Glacier in Antarctica

- Location within Antarctica
- Location: Coats Land
- Coordinates: 77°57′S 34°42′W
- Thickness: unknown
- Terminus: Vahsel Bay
- Status: unknown

Penck Glacier (77°57′S 34°42′W) is a small glacier flowing northward along the west side of Bertrab Nunatak to Vahsel Bay. Discovered by the German Antarctic Expedition, 1911–12, under Wilhelm Filchner, who named this feature for German geographer Albrecht Penck.

== See also ==
- List of glaciers in the Antarctic
