= Vorposten Peak =

Mountain in Queen Maud Land, Antarctica

Vorposten Peak (71°25′S 15°31′E) is an isolated peak (1,670 m) about 40 km (25 mi) northeast of the Payer Mountains in central Queen Maud Land. This feature was discovered by the Third German Antarctic Expedition (1938–1939), led by Alfred Ritscher, and named Vorposten (the outpost) because of its location at the eastern extremity of the area explored by the German expedition.
