= Roa Ridge =

Ridge in Antarctica

- Location within Antarctica

Geography
- Continent: Antarctica
- Region: Victoria Land
- Range coordinates: 77°38′S 162°20′E

Roa Ridge (77°38′S 162°20′E) is a bow-shaped ridge, 5 mi (8.0 km) long in the Asgard Range of Victoria Land, Antarctica. For much of its extent, it separates Matterhorn Glacier and Lacroix Glacier. Named by New Zealand Geographic Board (NZGB) in 1998. Roa is a Māori word meaning “long” ridge.

== Features ==
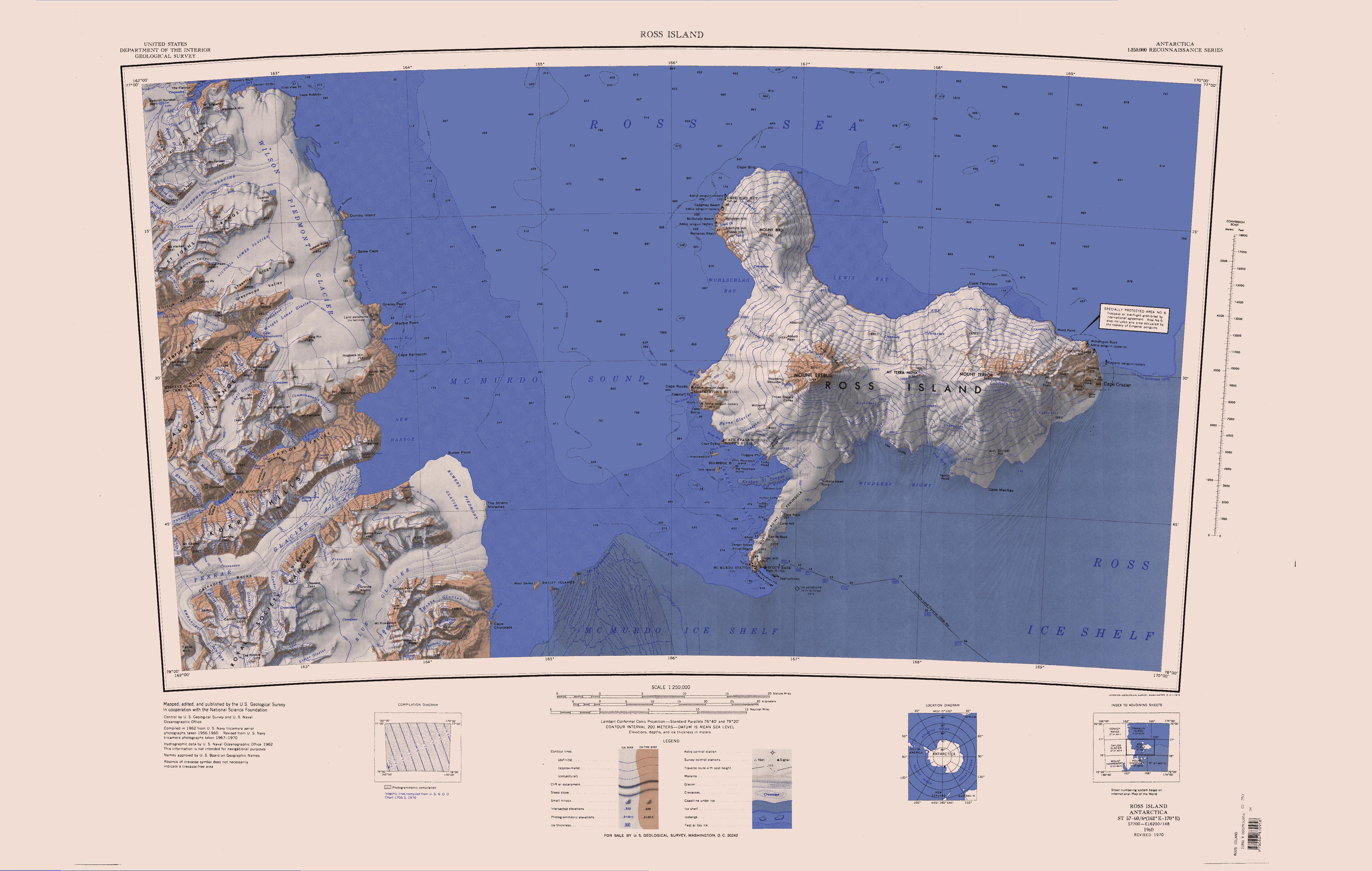
East end of Asgard Range south of center. Matterhorn between Matterhorn Glacier and Lacroix Glacier above the Taylor Valley.

From northwest to southeast, summits on the ridge include Vogler Peak, Mount Irvine, Hoehn Peak, Webb Peak and Matterhorn.

=== Markham Spur ===
77.65436°S 162.353918°E A prominent rock spur extending southwest from Roa Ridge into Matterhorn Glacier in Asgard Range, Victoria Land. Named by New Zealand Geographic Board (NZGB) (1998) after Geoffrey W. Markham, Secretary of the New Zealand National Committee for the IGY, 1957–58; first Superintendent of Antarctic Division, New Zealand DSIR, 1959-65.

=== Morelli Ridge ===
77.601653°S 162.308981°E. A ridge, 2.7 miles (4.3 km) long, that extends north from Hoehn Peak into the upper part of Bartley Glacier. Named by the United States Advisory Committee on Antarctic Names (US-ACAN) (1997) after Frank A. Morelli, Bioscience and Planetology Section, Jet Propulsion Laboratory, California Institute of Technology, who studied the surface distribution of microorganisms in soils of the McMurdo Dry Valleys, 1970-71 field season; member of the environmental monitoring team for the Dry Valley Drilling Project, 1973-74.

=== Vogler Peak ===
77.633619°S 162.210871°E A rock peak, 2,050 metres (6,730 ft) high, 0.75 nautical miles (1.39 km; 0.86 mi) southwest of Mount Irvine on Roa Ridge. Named for Jane Vogler, NSF program manager, who was NSF Science Representative at McMurdo and South Pole stations. Established the management plan for McMurdo's Albert P. Crary Science and Engineering Center (1985–86), and established the Foundation's Antarctic Environmental Research Program (1994).

=== Mount Irvine ===
77.629074°S 162.265285°E A peak rising to 2,067 metres (6,781 ft) high between Vogler Peak and Hoehn Peak on Roa Ridge, the dividing ridge at the heads of Bartley Glacier and Matterhorn Glacier. Named by New Zealand Geographic Board (NZGB) (1998) after Sir Robin Irvine (1929–96), formerly Vice Chancellor of the University of Otago, Chairman of the Ross Dependency Research Committee and of the Antarctic New Zealand Board.

=== Hoehn Peak ===
77.631219°S 162.301781°E A peak rising to 2,000 metres (6,600 ft) high at the head of Matterhorn Glacier; the peak marks the south end of Morelli Ridge. Named by Advisory Committee on Antarctic Names (US-ACAN) (1997) after Robert C. Hoehn, Civil Engineering Department, Virginia Polytechnic Institute and State University, who studied the Lake Bonney ecosystem during the 1974-75 field season.

=== Webb Peak ===
77.65°S 162.3833333°E A peak on Roa Ridge, 1.5 nautical miles (2.8 km; 1.7 mi) northwest of Matterhorn. The peak rises to 1,750 metres (5,740 ft) high between Matterhorn Glacier and Lacroix Glacier. Named by New Zealand Geographic Board (NZGB) (1998) after Eric N. Webb, a New Zealand magnetician with the Australasian Antarctic Expedition (AAE), 1911–14, led by Douglas Mawson.

=== Matterhorn ===
77°40′S 162°27′E Matterhorn Peak, 1,600 metres (5,200 ft) high, surmounting the north wall of Taylor Valley between Lacroix and Matterhorn Glaciers. So named by Griffith Taylor of the BrAE under Scott, 1910–13, because of its resemblance to the famous Swiss mountain.

=== Campbell Terrace ===
77.677416°S 162.480694°E A relatively horizontal ice-free area on the south side of Matterhorn. The terrace has a median elevation of 1,050 metres (3,440 ft) high and is additionally bounded by the lower margins of Matterhorn Glacier, Lacroix Glacier, and the northern wall of Taylor Valley. Named by New Zealand Geographic Board (NZGB) (1998) after Iain Campbell, New Zealand Soil Bureau, whose Antarctic research from 1964 spanned over 30 years.

== Sources ==
- Alberts, Fred G., ed. (1995), Geographic Names of the Antarctic (PDF) (2 ed.), United States Board on Geographic Names This article incorporates public domain material from websites or documents of the United States Board on Geographic Names.
- "Campbell Terrace", Geographic Names Information System, United States Geological Survey, United States Department of the Interior
- "Hoehn Peak", Geographic Names Information System, United States Geological Survey, United States Department of the Interior
- "Markham Spur", Geographic Names Information System, United States Geological Survey, United States Department of the Interior
- "Morelli Ridge", Geographic Names Information System, United States Geological Survey, United States Department of the Interior
- "Mount Irvine", Geographic Names Information System, United States Geological Survey, United States Department of the Interior
- "Roa Ridge", Geographic Names Information System, United States Geological Survey, United States Department of the Interior
- "Vogler Peak", Geographic Names Information System, United States Geological Survey, United States Department of the Interior
- "Webb Peak", Geographic Names Information System, United States Geological Survey, United States Department of the Interior

This article incorporates public domain material from websites or documents of the United States Geological Survey.
