= MS Schwabenland (1925) =

German catapult ship

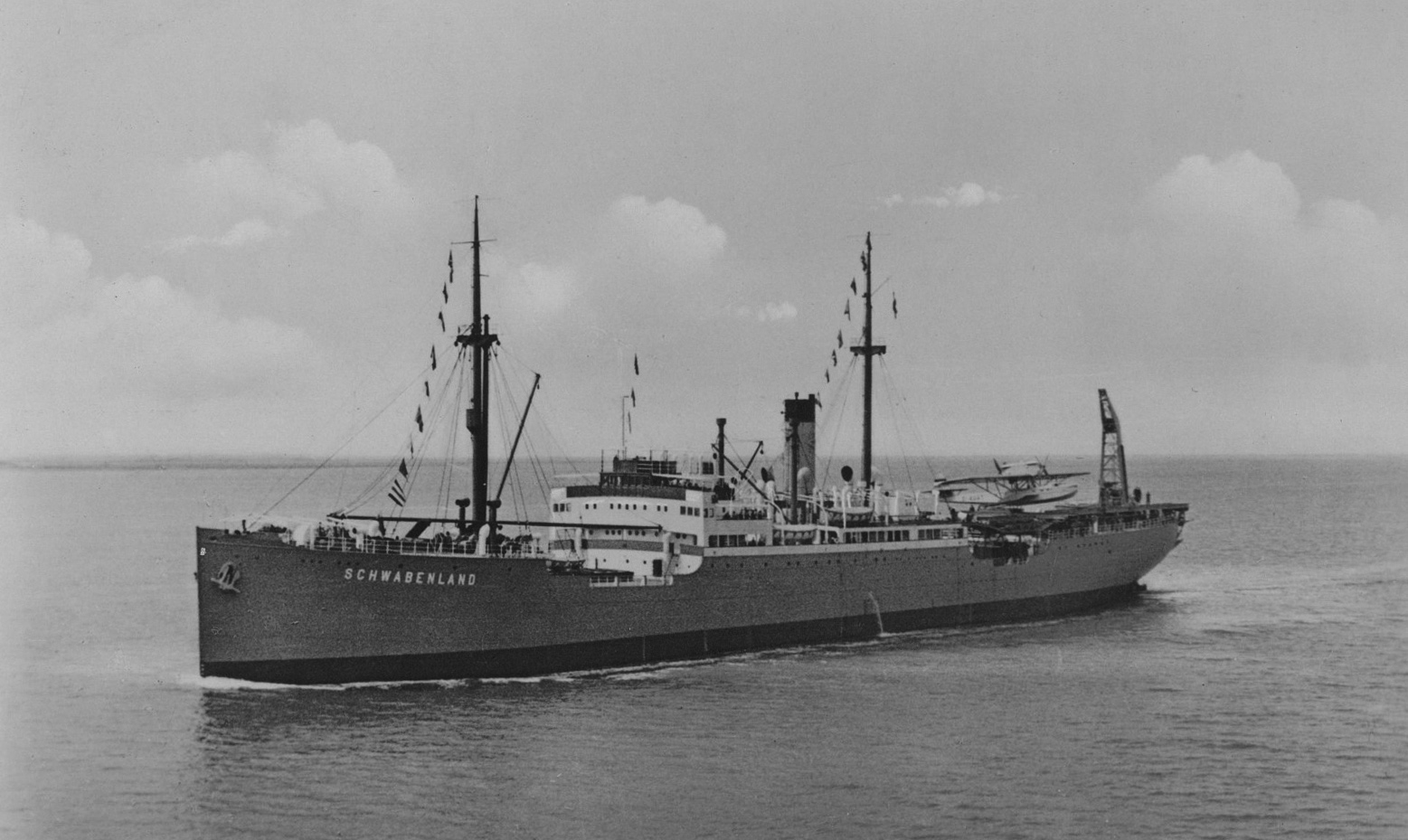
- Schwabenland before 1939

History

Weimar / Nazi Germany
- Name: MS Schwabenland
- Namesake: The region of Swabia in Germany
- Launched: 1925
- Completed: July 1925
- Refit: 1934
- Fate: Loaded with poison gas shells and scuttled, 31 December 1946

General characteristics
- Type: Steamship
- Tonnage: 8,500 GRT
- Propulsion: Twin diesel screws
- Speed: 12 knots (22 km/h; 14 mph)
- Aviation facilities: Crane and catapult for flying boats

MS Schwabenland was a German catapult ship owned by the Deutsche Luft Hansa. It took part in the 1938-1939 Third German Antarctic Expedition.

== Characteristics ==
Schwabenland was a Hansa liner of 8,500 gross register tons (GRT), built in 1925. It was converted into a catapult ship in 1934; a Heinkel-built K-9 catapult was installed on the ship's stern, along with a crane for lifting aircraft. The K-9 could accelerate a 15-ton aircraft to 94 miles per hour (151 km/h). Schwabenland's twin diesel screws gave it a speed of 12 knots (22 km/h; 14 mph).

== Lufthansa air mail ==
Lufthansa sought to engage in air mail service to the Americas using seaplanes launched off catapult ships, with Schwabenland being the second of those ships. The craft flew with a payload of 500 kg (1,100 lb) over 5,000 kilometres (3,100 mi); each flight carried 100,000 air mail letters.

Two Dornier Do 18 Lufthansa seaplanes christened Zephir and Aeolus were used for air mail flights from the Azores to the United States and from Fernando de Noronha to Natal.

== Third German Antarctic Expedition ==
Schwabenland was borrowed from Lufthansa for the 1938-1939 Third German Antarctic Expedition. The ship sailed in secret from Hamburg on 17 December 1938, carrying a complement of 82 men and two Dornier Wal seaplanes. The ship contacted the German whaling fleet off Bouvet Island, then anchored near the edge of the pack ice at 69°14′S, 4°30′W. After the expedition had completed its work, Schwabenland headed north on 6 February 1939, reaching Germany again on 11 April.

== World War II and fate ==
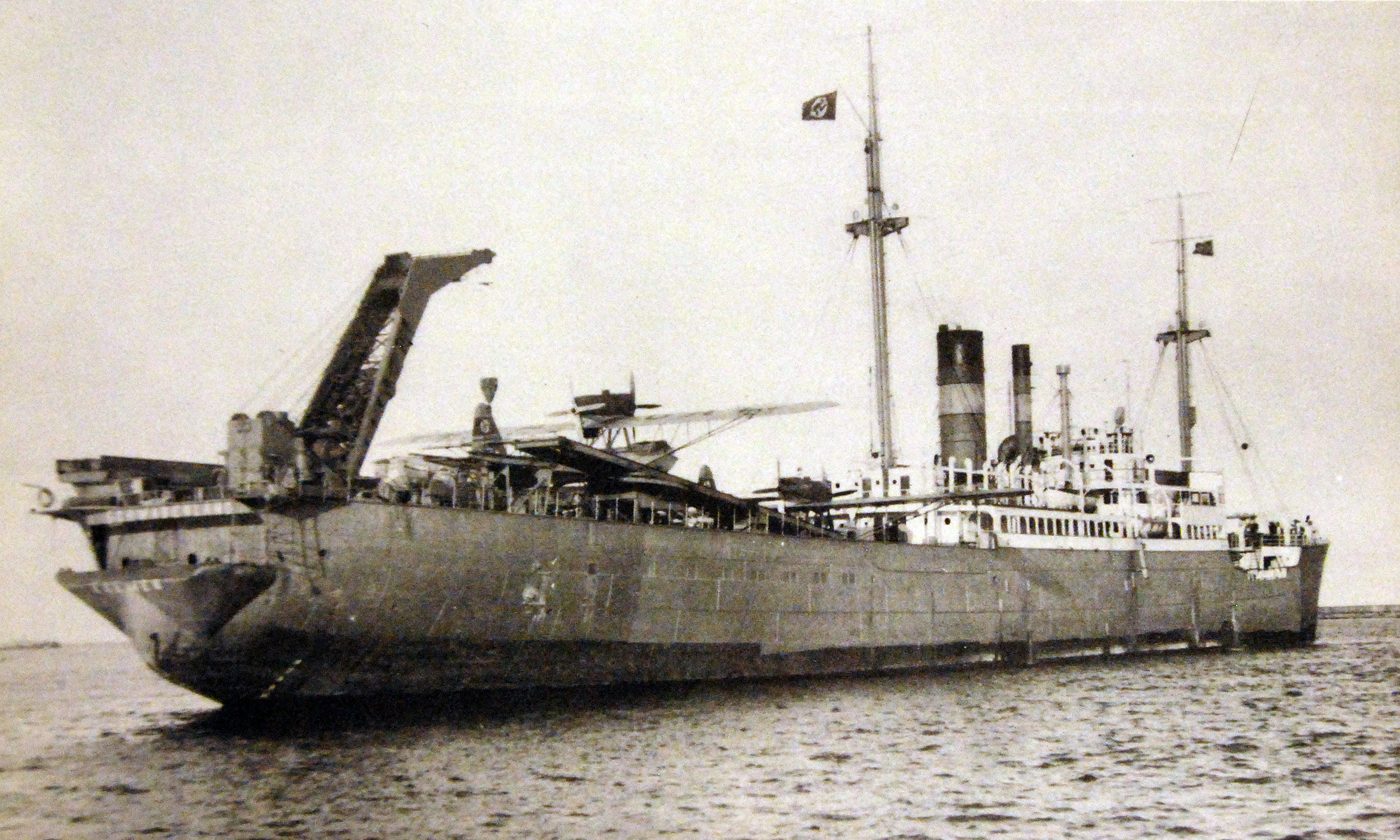
Schwabenland with two seaplanes near catapult, 1939

In October 1939 Schwabenland entered Luftwaffe service and used Blohm & Voss BV 138 seaplanes. After the fall of France it was stationed off the coast of Occupied France, based from the ports of Le Havre and Boulogne.

In August 1942 it was transferred to Tromsø, Norway.

The ship was damaged and forced to beach by the British submarine Terrapin in 1944 which was attacking a convoy off Flekkefjord, Norway. Schwabenland was then run aground at Sildeneset in Abelnes Harbour, and later refloated. When the war ended, the ship was taken by the British, and on 31 December 1946 it was loaded with poison gas ammunition, and scuttled in the Skagerrak as part of Operation Davy Jones' Locker.

== Bibliography ==
- Caruana, Joseph; Grobmeier, Alvin H.; Layman, R. D. & Truebe, Carl E. (1990). "Question 33/89". Warship International. XXVI (4): 417–420. ISSN 0043-0374.
- Murphy, David Thomas (2002). "Aryan Aurora". German Exploration of the Polar World : A History, 1870–1940. Lincoln: University of Nebraska Press. pp. 183–207. ISBN 0-8032-3205-5.
