= Lomonosov Mountains =

Mountain chain in Australia

The Lomonosov Mountains (71°31′S 15°20′E) are a somewhat isolated chain of mountains extending 18 nautical miles (33 km) northeast–southwest, located 20 nautical miles (37 km) east of the Wohlthat Mountains in Queen Maud Land, Antarctica. They were discovered and first plotted from air photos by the Third German Antarctic Expedition, 1938–39, and were mapped from air photos and surveys by the Sixth Norwegian Antarctic Expedition, 1958–59. The mountains were remapped by the Soviet Antarctic Expedition, 1960–61, and named after Russian scientist Mikhail Lomonosov.
