= German Antarctic Expedition (1938–1939) =

Nazi Germany polar expedition

Expedition logo

The German Antarctic Expedition of 1938–1939 was led by Kriegsmarine captain Alfred Ritscher (1879–1963) and was the third official Antarctic expedition of the German Reich, by order of the "Commissioner for the Four Year Plan" Hermann Göring. Prussian State Councilor Helmuth Wohlthat was mandated with planning and preparation.

The expedition's main objective was of economic nature, in particular the establishment of a whaling station and the acquisition of fishing grounds for a German whaling fleet in order to reduce the Reich's dependence on the import of industrial oils, fats and dietary fats. Preparations took place under strict secrecy as the enterprise was also tasked to make a feasibility assessment for a future occupation of Antarctic territory in the region between 20 ° West and 20 ° East.

== Background ==
Like many other countries, Germany sent expeditions to the Antarctic region in the late 19th and early 20th centuries, most of which were scientific. The late 19th century expeditions to the Southern Ocean, South Georgia, the Kerguelen Islands, and the Crozet Islands were astronomical, meteorological, and hydrological, mostly in close collaboration with scientific teams from other countries. As the 19th century ended, Germany began to focus on Antarctica.

The first German expedition to Antarctica was the Gauss expedition from 1901 to 1903. Led by Arctic veteran and geology professor Erich von Drygalski, this was the second expedition to use a hot-air balloon in Antarctica. It also found and named Kaiser Wilhelm II Land. The second German Antarctic expedition (1911–1912) was led by Wilhelm Filchner with a goal of crossing Antarctica to learn if it was one piece of land. As happened with other such early attempts, the crossing failed before it even began. The expedition discovered and named the Luitpold Coast and the Filchner Ice Shelf. A German whaling fleet was put to sea in 1937 and, upon its successful return in early 1938, plans for a third German Antarctic expedition were drawn up.

== Preparations ==
In July 1938, Captain Alfred Ritscher received a mandate to launch preparations for an Antarctic expedition and within a few months he managed to bring about logistics, equipment and organizational measures for a topographical and marine survey expedition. Whale oil was then the most important raw material for the production of margarine and soap in Germany and the country was the second largest purchaser of Norwegian whale oil, importing some 200,000 tons annually. Dependence on imports and the forthcoming war was considered to put too much strain on Germany's foreign currency reserves. Supported by whaling expert Otto Kraul marine explorations were to be undertaken in order to set up a base for a whaling fleet and aerial photo surveys were to be carried out to map territory.

With only six months available for preparatory work, Ritscher had to rely on the antiquated MS Schwabenland ship and aircraft of Deutsche Lufthansa's Atlantic Service, with which a scientific program along the coast was to be carried out and retrieve biologic, meteorologic, oceanographic and geomagnetic studies. By applying modern aerophotogrammetric methods, Aerial surveys of the unknown Antarctic hinterlands were to be carried out with two Dornier Do J II seaplanes, named Boreas and Passat, that had to be launched via a steam catapult on the MS Schwabenland expedition ship. After urgent repairs on the ship and the two seaplanes, the crew of 82 members in total, left Hamburg on December 17, 1938.

== Expedition ==
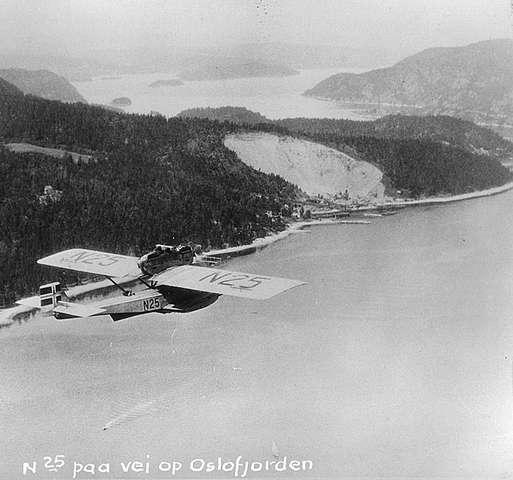
A Dornier Do J seaplane in flight

The Expedition reached the Princess Martha Coast on January 19, 1939, and was active along the Queen Maud Land coast from 19 January to 15 February 1939. In seven survey flights between January 20 and February 5, 1939, an area of approx. 350.000 km^{2} (135.136 sq mi) was photogrammetrically mapped. Previously unknown ice-free mountain ranges, several small ice-free lakes were discovered in the hinterland. The ice-free Schirmacher Oasis, which now hosts the Maitri and Novolazarevskaya research stations, was spotted from the air by the pilot Richard Schirmacher (who named it after himself).

At the turning points of the flight polygons, 1.2 m (3.9 ft) long aluminum arrows, with 30 cm (12 in) steel cones and three upper stabilizer wings embossed with swastikas were supposedly dropped in order to establish German claims to ownership (which, however, was never raised). Through flight complications, those marker were only dropped once. During an additional eight special flights, in which Ritscher also took part, particularly interesting regions were filmed and taken with color photos. The team flew over an area of about 600.000 km^{2} (231.661 sq mi).

Around 11,600 aerial photographs were taken. Biological investigations were carried out on board the Schwabenland and on the sea ice on the coast. However, the insufficient equipment did not allow sled expeditions to the ice shelf or landings of the flying boats in the mountains. All explorations were carried out without a single member of the expedition having entered the inner territory.

The region between 10 ° W and 15 ° E was named New Swabia (Neuschwabenland) by the expedition leader. In the meantime, the Norwegian government had found out about the German Antarctic activities after the wife of the deputy expedition leader and geologist, Ernst Herrmann had informed, by mistake, Norwegian geologist Adolf Hoel, via a phone call. On January 14, 1939, the Norwegian government declared the entire sector between 20 ° W and 45 ° E Norwegian territory (Queen Maud Land) without defining its southern extent.

On February 6, 1939, the expedition embarked on its return voyage, left the coast of Antarctica and carried out oceanographic research in the vicinity of Bouvet Island and Fernando de Noronha. In addition, there was a secret military assignment to explore the islands of Trindade and Martim Vaz for use as potential future naval bases. The landing crew was shipwrecked in a small bay and had to be rescued. On April 11, 1939, the Schwabenland arrived in Hamburg.

== Scientific evaluation ==
Until 1942 pioneer geodesist Otto von Gruber produced detailed topographical maps of eastern New Swabia at a scale of 1: 50,000 and an overview map of all explored territories. Among the newly discovered areas were, for example, the Kraul Mountains, named after whaling expert and pilot Otto Kraul. The evaluation of the results in western New Swabia was interrupted by World War II and a large part of the 11,600 oblique aerial photographs were lost during the war. In addition to the images and maps published by Ritscher, only about 1,100 aerial photos survived the war, but these were only rediscovered and evaluated in 1982. The results of the biological, geophysical and meteorological investigations were only published after the war between 1954 and 1958. Captain Ritscher did in fact prepare another expedition with improved, lighter aircraft on skids, which however was never carried out due to the outbreak of the Second World War.

== Geographic features mapped by the expedition ==
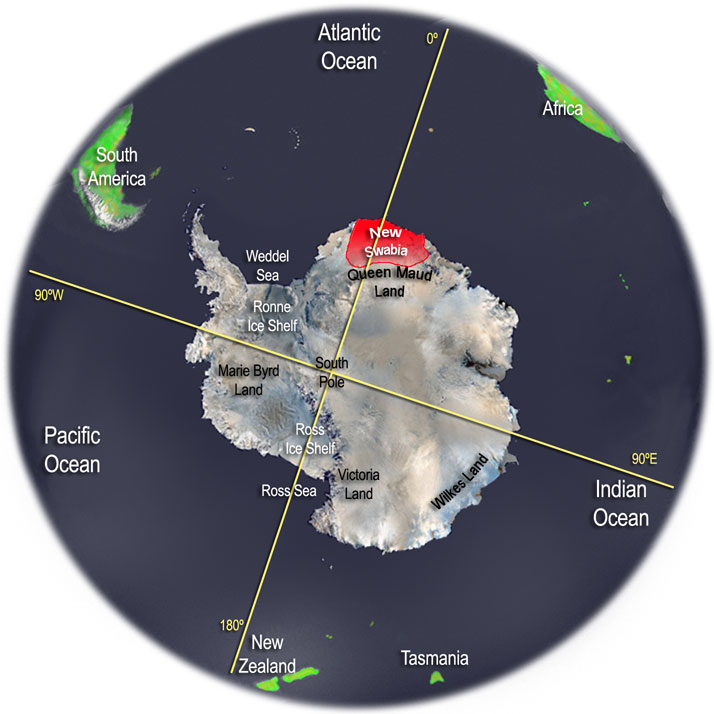
Map of Antarctica, The red area shows the extent of terrain mapped by air.

As the area was first explored by a German expedition, the name New Swabia and German names given to its geographic features are still used on many maps. Some geographic features mapped by the expedition were not named until the Norwegian-British-Swedish Antarctic Expedition (NBSAE) of 1949–1952, led by John Schjelderup Giæver. Others were only named after they were remapped from aerial photos taken by the Norwegian Antarctic Expedition of 1958–1959.

The exact location of objects in italics could not yet be determined because the position was given too imprecisely in the expedition report due to navigation problems with the aircraft, and most of the aerial photographs that would have allowed identification were lost during World War II. The names of objects that could be clearly located were used in the Norwegian translation of the topographical map Dronning Maud Land 1:250,000 published by the Norwegian Polar Institute in 1966.

Name	Name on the Norwegian Map	Position (Informationen in the "Bundesanzeiger")	Named after / Note
Alexander-von-Humboldt-Mountains	Humboldtfjella	71° 24′–72° S, 11°–12° O	Alexander von Humboldt
Humboldt Basin	Humboldtsøkket	Near the eastern border of the Alexander-von-Humboldt-Mountains	Alexander von Humboldt
Altar	Altaret	71° 36′ S, 11° 18′ O	distinctive mountain shape
Amelang Plateau	Ladfjella	74° S, 6° 12′–6° 30′ W	Herbert Amelang, 1. Officer of the "Schwabenland“
Am Überlauf (At the Overflow)	Grautrenna	Easterly to the Eckhörner (Corner Horns)	glaciated pass
Barkley Mountains	Barkleyfjella	72° 48′ S, 1° 30′–0° 48′ O	Erich Barkley (1912–1944), biologist
Bastion	Bastionen	71° 18′ S, 13° 36′ O	
Bludau Mountains	Hallgrenskarvet und Heksegryta	Part Iof a 150 km mountain range 72° 42′ S, 3° 30′ W und 74° S, 5° W	Josef Bludau (1889–1967), ships surgeon
Mount Bolle		72° 18′ S, 6° 30′ O	Herbert Bolle, Deutsche Lufthansa, foreman of the aircraft assemblers
Boreas	Boreas		Dornier Wal D-AGAT „Boreas“
Brandt Mountain		72° 13′ S, 1° 0′ O	Emil Brandt (* 1900), Sailor, saved an expedition member from drowning
Mount Bruns		72° 05′ S, 1° 0′ O	Herbert Bruns (* 1908), electrical engineer of the expedition ship
Buddenbrock Range		71° 42′ S, 6° O	Friedrich Freiherr von Buddenbrock, Operations Manager of Atlantic Flights at Deutsche Lufthansa
Bundermann Range	Grytøyrfjellet	71° 48′–72° S, 3° 24′ O	Max Bundermann (* 1904), aerial photographer
Conrad Mountains	Conradfjella	71° 42′–72° 18′ S, 10° 30′ O	Fritz Conrad
Dallmann Mountains	Dallmannfjellet	71° 42′–72° S, closely west 11° O	Eduard Dallmann
Drygalski Mountains	Drygalskifjella	71° 6′–71° 48′ S, 7° 6′–9° 30′ O	Erich von Drygalski
Eckhörner (Corner Horns)	Hjørnehorna	North end of the Alexander-von-Humboldt-Gebirges	markante Bergform
Filchner Mountains	Filchnerfjella	71° 6′–71° 48′ S, 7° 6′–9° 30′ O	Wilhelm Filchner
Gablenz-Ridge		72°–72° 18′ S, 5° O	Carl August von Gablenz
Gburek Peaks	Gburektoppane	72° 42′ S, 0° 48′–1° 10′ W	Leo Gburek (1910–1941), geomagnetist
Geßner Peak	Gessnertind	71° 54′ S, 6° 54′ O	Wilhelm Geßner (1890–1945), Director of Hansa Luftbild
Gneiskopf Peak	Gneisskolten	71° 54′ S, 12° 12′ O	prominent peak
Gockel-Ridge	Vorrkulten	73° 12′ S, 0° 12′ W	Wilhelm Gockel, meteorologist of the expedition
Graue Hörner (Grey Horns)	Gråhorna	Southern corner of the Petermann mountain range	
Gruber Mountains	Slokstallen und Petrellfjellet	72° S, 4° O	Erich Gruber (1912–1940), radio operator on D-AGAT „Boreas“
Habermehl Peak	Habermehltoppen	Westernly to the Geßnerpeak	Richard Habermehl, head of the Reich Weather Service
Mount Hädrich		71° 57′ S, 6° 12′ O	Willy Hädrich, Authorized officer at Deutsche Lufthansa, responsible for the accounting of the expedition
Mount Hedden		72° 8′ S, 1° 10′ O	Karl Hedden, Sailor, saved an expedition member from drowning
Herrmann Mountains		73° S, 0°–1° O	Ernst Herrmann, geologist of the expedition
In der Schüssel (In the Bowl)	Grautfatet	in the North of the Alexander-von-Humboldt-Gebirges	glaciated valley
Johannes Müller Ridge	Müllerkammen		Johannes Müller († 1941), Participant in the 2nd German South Polar Expedition in 1911/12, Head of the Nautical Department of the North German Lloyd
Kaye Peak	Langfloget	72° 30′ S, 4° 48′ O	Georg Kaye, Naval architect, looked after the ships of Lufthansa
Kleinschmidt Peak	Enden	Part of a 150 km long ridge between 72°42′ S, 3°30′ W and 74° S, 5° W	Ernst Kleinschmidt, German Maritime Observatory
Kottas Mountains	Milorgfjella	74° 6′–74° 18′ S, 8° 12′–9° W	Alfred Kottas, Captain of the "Schwabenland"
Kraul Mountains	Vestfjella		Otto Kraul, ice pilot
Krüger Mountains	Kvitskarvet	73° 6′ S, 1° 18′ O	Walter Krüger, meteorologist of the expedition
Kubus	Kubus	72° 24′ S, 7° 30′ O	distinctive mountain shape
Kurze Mountain Range	Kurzefjella	72° 6′–72° 30′ S, 9° 30′–10° O	Friedrich Kurze, Vice Admiral, Head of the Nautical Department of the Naval High Command
Lange-Plateau		71° 58′ S, 0° 25′ O	Heinz Lange (1908–1943), meteorlogical assistant
Loesener Plateau	Skorvetangen, Hamarskorvene und Kvithamaren	72° S, 4° 18′ O	Kurt Loesener, airplane mechanic of D-AGAT „Boreas“
Lose Plateau	Lausflæet		distinctive mountain shape
Luz Ridge		72°–72° 18′ S, 5° 30′ O	Martin Luz, commercial director at the German Lufthansa
Mayr Mountain Range	Jutulsessen	72°–72° 18′ S, 3° 24′ O	Rudolf Mayr, Pilot of D-ALOX „Passat“
Matterhorn	Ulvetanna	highest peak in den Drygalski-Mountains	distinctive mountain shape
Mentzel Mountains	Mentzelfjellet	71° 18′ S, 13° 42′ O	Rudolf Mentzel
Mühlig-Hofmann Mountains	Mühlig-Hofmannfjella	71° 48′–72° 36′ S, 3° O	Albert Mühlig-Hofmann
Neumayer steep face	Neumayerskarvet		Georg von Neumayer
New Swabia			Expeditionship „Schwabenland“
Northwestern Island	Nordvestøya	Northend of the Alexander-von-Humboldt-Gebirges	island-like nunatak group
Eastern Hochfeld	Austre Høgskeidet	between the southern and central sections of the Petermann range	Ice tongue
Obersee (Upper Lake)	Øvresjøen	71° 12′ S, 13° 42′ O	frozen lake
Passat	Passat		Donier Wal D-ALOX
Paulsen Mountains	Brattskarvet, Vendeholten und Vendehø	72° 24′ S, 1° 30′ O	Karl-Heinz Paulsen, oceanographer of the expedition
Payer Mountain group	Payerfjella	72° 0′ S, 14° 42′ O	Julius von Payer
Penck Trough	Pencksøkket		Albrecht Penck
Petermann Range	Petermannkjeda	Between the Alexander-Humboldt-Mountains and the „zentralen Wohlthatmassiv“ [=Otto-von-Gruber-Mountains] on 71°18′–72°9′ S	August Petermann
Preuschoff Ridge	Hochlinfjellet	72° 18′–72° 30′ S, 4° 30′ O	Franz Preuschoff, airplane Mechanic of D-ALOX „Passat“
Regula Mountain Range	Regulakjeda		Herbert Regula (1910–1980), I. Meteorologist of the expedition
Ritscherpeak	Ritschertind	71° 24′ S, 13° 24′ O	Alfred Ritscher
Ritscher Upland	Ritscherflya		Alfred Ritscher
Mount Röbke	Isbrynet		Karl-Heinz Röbke (* 1909), II. Officer on the „Schwabenland“
Mount Ruhnke	Festninga	72° 30′ S, 4° O	Herbert Ruhnke (1904–1944), Radio operator on D-ALOX „Passat“
Sauter Mountain bar	Terningskarvet	72° 36′ S, 3° 18′ O	Siegfried Sauter, aerial photographer
Schirmacher Ponds	Schirmacher Oasis	70° 40′ S, 11° 40′ O	Richardheinrich Schirmacher, Pilot of D-AGAT „Boreas“
Schneider-Riegel		73° 42′ S, 3° 18′ W	Hans Schneider, Head of the Sea-Flight Department of the German Maritime Observatory and Professor of Meteorology
Schubertpeak	Høgfonna und Ovbratten	Part of a 150 km long ridge between 72°42′ S, 3°30′ W und 74° S, 5° W	Otto von Schubert, Head of the Nautical Department of the German Maritime Observatory
Schulz Heights	Lagfjella	73° 42′ S, 7° 36′ W	Robert Schulz, II. Engineer on the „Schwabenland“
Schicht Mountains	Sjiktberga	71° 24′ S, 13° 12′ O	
Schwarze Hörner (Black horns)	Svarthorna	southern corner of the northern part of the Petermann range	distinctive mountain range
See Kopf (Sea-Head)	Sjøhausen	71° 12′ S, 13° 48′ O	distinctive mountain
Seilkopf Mountains	Nälegga	Part of a 150 km long ridge between 72°42′ S, 3°30′ W and° S, 5° W	Heinrich Seilkopf, Head of the Sea-Flight Department of the German Maritime Observatory and Professor of Meteorology
Sphinxkopf Peak	Sfinksskolten	On the north end of the Petermann range	distinctive mountain
Spieß Peak	Huldreslottet	Part of a 150 km long ridge between. 72°42′ S, 3°30′ W and 74° S, 5° W	Admiral Fritz Spieß, commander of the research vessel Meteor
Stein Peaks	Straumsnutane		Willy Stein, Boatswain of the „Schwabenland“
Todt Mountain bar	Todtskota	71° 18′ S, 14° 18′ O	Herbert Todt, Assistant of the expeditionleader
Uhligpeak	Uhligberga	Part of a 150 km long ridge between72°42′ S, 3°30′ W and 74° S, 5° W	Karl Uhlig, Leading Engineer of the „Schwabenland“
Lake Untersee	Nedresjøen	71° 18′ S, 13° 30′ O	frozen lake
Vorposten Peak	Forposten	71° 24′ S, 15° 48′ O	remote nunatak
Western Hochfeld	Vestre Høgskeidet		glaciated plain
Weyprecht Mountains	Weyprechtfjella	72° 0′ S, 13° 30′ O	Carl Weyprecht
Wegener Inland Ice	Wegenerisen		Alfred Wegener
Wittepeaks	Marsteinen, Valken, Krylen und Knotten		Dietrich Witte, engine attendant of the "Schwabenland“
Wohlthat Mountain Range	Wohlthatmassivet		Helmuth Wohlthat
Mount Zimmermann	Zimmermannfjellet	71° 18′ S, 13° 24′ O	Carl Zimmermann, Vice President of the German Research Foundation
Zuckerhut (sugar loaf)	Sukkertoppen	71° 24′ S, 13° 30′ O	distinctive mountain shape
Zwiesel Mountain	Zwieselhøgda	On the southern ends of the Petermann range	

== Public perception ==
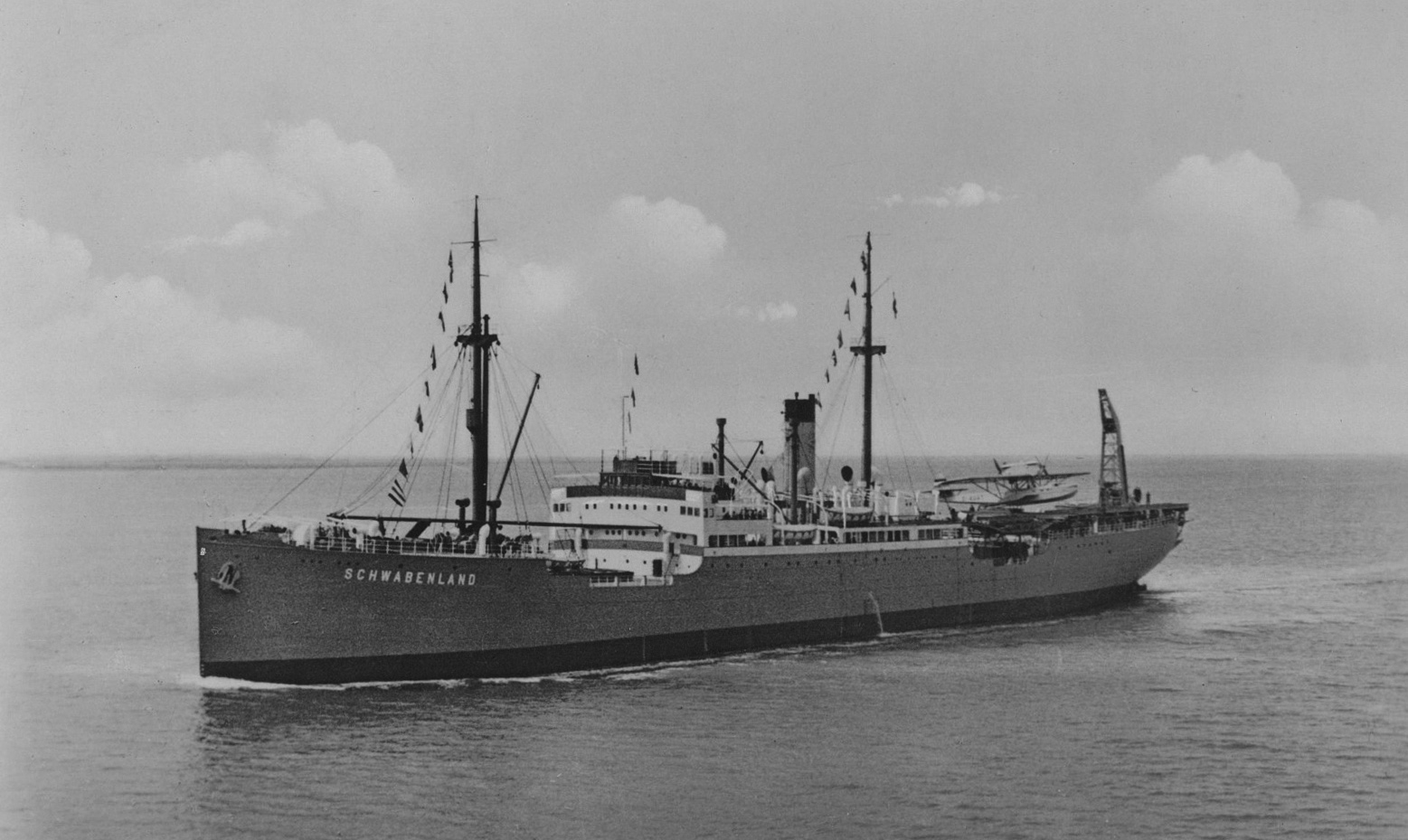
MS Schwabenland

As a result of great secrecy and relatively little time for preparation, the enterprise escaped nearly any advanced public attention as the MS Schwabenland embarked unnoticed.

The first report of the expedition was telegraphed only during the return journey from Cape Town to Helmut Wohlthat, who published a press release on March 6, 1939. As in Great Britain The Daily Telegraph and in the US The New York Times reported on the expedition in reference to the Norwegian occupation of the area, only the Hamburg local press took notice of the expedition's return to Germany. On May 25, 1939, the Berliner Illustrirte Zeitung magazine published a small-scale map of the mountains discovered and the flight polygons without authorization by the expedition leader. The map was drawn by the aircraft mechanic Franz Preuschoff and is as such referred to as the "Preuschoff map". This map was incorporated in the 1939 1: 10,000,000 scale map of Antarctica by Australian cartographer E. P. Bayliss.

A reference to the expedition was posted in the Berlin Zoological Garden in front of the Emperor penguin enclosure. The penguins had been caught by Lufthansa flight captain Rudolf Mayr, flight mechanic Franz Preuschoff and zoologist Erich Barkley and arrived in Cuxhaven on April 12, 1939. The expedition geologist Ernst Herrmann, published the only popular science book for a wider audience for more than 60 years in 1941. Due to the lack of information during the following decades, myths and conspiracy theories eventually developed around the expedition and Neuschwabenland.

Although Germany issued a decree about the establishment of a German Antarctic Sector called New Swabia after the expedition's return in August 1939 no official territorial claims were ever advanced for the region and were fully abandoned in 1945. No whaling station or other lasting structure was built by Germany until the Georg von Neumayer Station, a research facility, established in 1981. The current Neumayer Station III is also located in the region.

New Swabia is occasionally mentioned in historical contexts, it is not an officially recognized cartographic designation today. The region is part of Queen Maud Land, administered by Norway as a dependent territory under the Antarctic Treaty System, and overseen by the Polar Affairs Department of the Ministry of Justice and the Police.

=== Conspiracy theories ===
New Swabia has been the subject of conspiracy theories for decades, some of them related to Nazi UFO claims. Most assert that, in the wake of the German expedition of 1938–39, a huge military base was built there. After the war, high-ranking Nazis, scientists, and elite military units are claimed to have survived there. The US and UK have supposedly been trying to conquer the area for decades, and to have used nuclear weapons in this effort. Proponents claim the base is sustained by hot springs providing energy and warmth.

The WDR radio play Neuschwabenland-Symphonie from 2012 takes up the conspiracy theories.

== Crew list ==
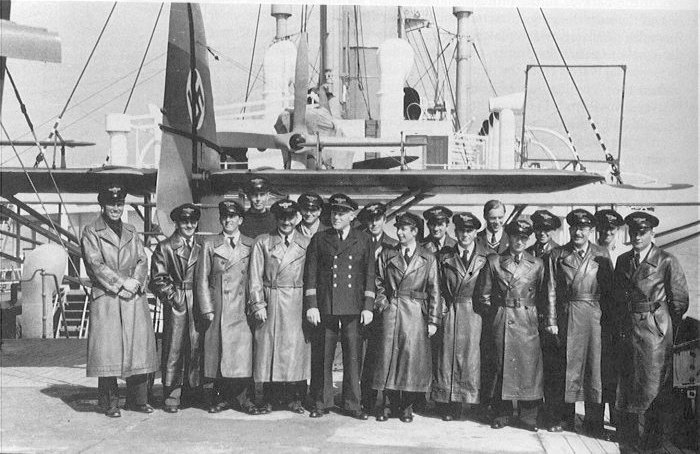
Part of the Crew on 'Schwabenland'.

The list contains all expedition members of the German Antarctic Expedition 1938/39. Under 'Remarks' it is indicated, if the participants had already taken part in any previous polar expeditions. Most of the crew members of the Schwabenland had previously served on this ship in the Atlantic service. As far as is known, all members were of German nationality.

Name	Organization	Task	Remarks
Scientific Personnel
Alfred Ritscher (1879–1963)	High Command of the Navy	Expedition leader	Participant of the Schröder-Stranz-Expedition 1912–13, Marine Aviator in World War 1
Ernst Herrmann (1895–1970)	Teacher, Berlin	Geologist, deputy expedition leader	Private Expeditions to Spitsbergen 1937 und Greenland 1938
Dr. Herbert Regula (1910–1980)	German Maritime Observatory	I. Meteorologist	Meteorologist on the catapult ship Westfalen 1933–34
Heinz Lange (1908–1943)	Reichs Office for Weather Service	II. Meteorologist, Specialist on radiosondes	
Walter Krüger (1905–1948)	Reichs Office for Weather Service	Meteorology Assistant	Participant of the Meteor Expedition 1925–27
Wilhelm Gockel (1908– )	Marine Observatory Wilhelmshaven	Meteorology Assistant	
Erich Barkley (1912–1944)	Reich Institute for Fisheries, Institute for Whale catching	Biologist	Seven months in antarctic waters with the whaler C.L. Larsen 1937/38
Leo Gburek (1910–1941)	University Leipzig, Geomagnetic Institute	Geophysicist	Two expeditions for the purpose of geomagnetic surveys to Spitsbergen in 1937 and 1938 (there he met E. Herrmann)
Karl-Heinz Paulsen (1909–1941)	University Hamburg	Oceanographer	One whaling season on Jan Wellem 1937/38
Aviation personnel
Rudolf Mayr (Pilot) (1910–1991)	Lufthansa	Pilot of the Dornier-Wal airplane Passat	Pilot of Dornier-Wal Perssuak during the Danish expedition to northeast Greenland and Peary Land April–June 1938 under Lauge Koch, later chief pilot of Lufthansa
Franz Preuschoff	Lufthansa	Flight engineer	Together with Mayr on the expedition to Northeast Greenland and Peary Land April–June 1938, later chief flight engineer of Lufthansa
Herbert Ruhnke (1904–1944)	Lufthansa	flight radio operator	
Max Bundermann (1904– )	Hansa Luftbild	Aerial photographer	Participant of a NSIU expedition to northeast Greenland in 1932, during which he took 2109 aerial photographs from a Lockheed Vega
Richardheinrich Schirmacher	Lufthansa	Pilot of the Dornier-Wal airplane Boreas	
Kurt Loesener	Lufthansa	Flight engineer	
Erich Gruber (1912–1940)	Lufthansa	Flight radio operator	
Siegfried Sauter (1916–2008)	Hansa Luftbild	Aerial photographer	
Crew of the Schwabenland
Alfred Kottas (1885–1969)	Lufthansa	Captain	
Otto Kraul (1892–1972)	From Hamburg	Ice Pilot	Whaling chief on the Jan Wellem 1937/38
Herbert Amelang	Norddeutscher Lloyd	I. Officer, Deputy Commander	
Josef Bludau (1889–1967)	Norddeutscher Lloyd	Ships surgeon	
Karl-Heinz Röbke (1909– )	Norddeutsche Lloyd	II. Officer	As NSDAP-Member responsible for the „political reliability“ of the expedition members
Hans Werner Viereck	Norddeutscher Lloyd	III. Officer	
Vincenz Grisar	Norddeutscher Lloyd	IV. Officer	
Erich Harmsen	Deutsche Lufthansa	Ship's radio conductor	
Kurt Bojahr	Deutsche Lufthansa	Ship's radio officer	
Ludwig Müllermerstadt	Deutsche Lufthansa	Ship's radio officer	
Karl Uhlig (1885– )	Norddeutscher Lloyd	Leading Engineer	
Robert Schulz	Norddeutscher Lloyd	II. Engineer	
Henry Maas	Norddeutscher Lloyd	III. Engineer	
Edgar Gäng	Norddeutscher Lloyd	IV. Engineer	
Hans Nielsen	Norddeutscher Lloyd	V. Engineer	
Johann Frey	Norddeutscher Lloyd	Engineer assistant	
Georg Jelschen	Norddeutscher Lloyd	Engineer assistant	
Heinz Siewert	Norddeutscher Lloyd	Engineer assistant	
Herbert Bruns (1908– )	Atlas Werke	Electrical engineer	
Karl-Heinz Bode	Norddeutscher Lloyd	Electrician	
Herbert Bolle	Deutsche Lufthansa	Foreman	
Wilhelm Hartmann	Deutsche Lufthansa	Catapult leader	
Alfred Rücker	Deutsche Lufthansa	Manager of the flight store	
Franz Weiland	Deutsche Lufthansa	Flight mechanic	
Axel Mylius	Deutsche Lufthansa	Flight mechanic	
Wilhelm Lende	Deutsche Lufthansa	Flight mechanic	
Willy Stein	Norddeutscher Lloyd	Boatswain	
Richard Wehrend	Norddeutscher Lloyd	I. Carpenter	
Alfons Schäfer	Norddeutscher Lloyd	II. Carpenter	
Heinz Hoek	Norddeutscher Lloyd	Sailor	
Jürgen Ulpts	Norddeutscher Lloyd	Sailor	
Albert Weber	Norddeutscher Lloyd	Sailor	
Adolf Kunze	Norddeutscher Lloyd	Sailor	Took part as a sailor in the Second German Antarctic Expedition 1911/12 under Wilhelm Filchner
Karl Hedden	Norddeutscher Lloyd	Sailor	
Eugen Klenck	Norddeutscher Lloyd	Sailor	
Fritz Jedamezyk	Norddeutscher Lloyd	Sailor	
Emil Brandt (1900– )	Norddeutscher Lloyd	Sailor	
Kurt Ohnemüller	Norddeutscher Lloyd	Sailor	
Alfred Peters	Norddeutscher Lloyd	Easy sailor	
Alex Burtscheid	Norddeutscher Lloyd	Ship's boy	
Karl-Heinz Meyer	Norddeutscher Lloyd	Ship's boy	
Walter Brinkmann	Norddeutscher Lloyd	Storeman	
Dietrich Witte	Norddeutscher Lloyd	Engine attendant	
Erich Kubacki	Norddeutscher Lloyd	Engine attendant	
Walter Dräger	Norddeutscher Lloyd	Engine attendant	
Karl Olbrich	Norddeutscher Lloyd	Assistant boiler attendant	
Georg Niemüller	Norddeutscher Lloyd	Assistant boiler attendant	
Friedrich Mathwig	Norddeutscher Lloyd	Cleaner	
Ferdinand Dunekamp	Norddeutscher Lloyd	Cleaner	
Erwin Steinmetz	Norddeutscher Lloyd	Cleaner	
Herbert Callis	Norddeutscher Lloyd	Cleaner	
Helmut Dulatschow	Norddeutscher Lloyd	Baker	
Otto Sieland	Norddeutscher Lloyd	I. Cook	
Fritz Troe	Norddeutscher Lloyd	II. Cook	
Gottfried Thole	Norddeutscher Lloyd	Cook's mate and baker	
Ferdinand Wolf	Norddeutscher Lloyd	Cook's mate and butcher	
Hans Büttner	Norddeutscher Lloyd	Kitchen boy	
Willi Reeps	Norddeutscher Lloyd	I. Steward	
Wilhelm Malyska	Norddeutscher Lloyd	Steward	
Rudolf Stawicki	Norddeutscher Lloyd	Steward	
Willi Fröhling	Norddeutscher Lloyd	Mess steward	
Johann van de Logt	Norddeutscher Lloyd	Mess steward	
Rudolf Burghard	Norddeutscher Lloyd	Mess steward	
Rolf Oswald	Norddeutscher Lloyd	Mess boy	
Johann Bates	Norddeutscher Lloyd	Mess boy	
other employees
Herbert Todt (1911–2003)	Employee of the expedition 1938 bis 1941	Secretary of the Expedition	
Ilse Uhlmann (1916–1997)	Employees of the expedition	Secretary	later wife of Alfred Ritscher

== See also ==
- First German Antarctic Expedition (1901-1903)
- Second German Antarctic Expedition (1911- 1912)
- 1938–39 German expedition to Tibet
- German Amazon-Jary-Expedition (1935-1937)
- Antarctica during World War II
- Operation Tabarin
- Operation Highjump
