= Alfred Ritscher =

20th-century German polar explorer

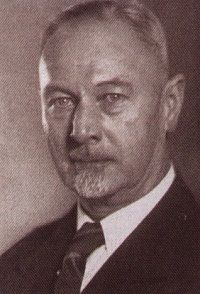
- Born: 23 May 1879; Bad Lauterberg, Prussia
- Died: 30 March 1963 (aged 83); Hamburg, West Germany
- Military career
- Allegiance: German Empire; Weimar Republic; Nazi Germany
- Branch: Imperial German Navy; Reichsmarine; Kriegsmarine
- Rank: Kapitän zur See
- Awards: Grand Federal Cross of Merit of the Federal Republic of Germany(1959)
- Other work: led the Third German Antarctic Expedition

Alfred Ritscher (23 May 1879 in Bad Lauterberg – 30 March 1963 in Hamburg) was a German polar explorer. A Kapitän zur See in the Kriegsmarine, he led the third German Antarctic Expedition in 1938–39, which mapped the New Swabia (German: Neuschwabenland) territories of Queen Maud Land. Ritscher Peak and Ritscher Upland there are named for him.

== Biography ==
In 1897 Alfred Ritscher made his first trip as a cabin boy on the Bremen ship "Emily". In 1903 he passed his helmsman exams and earned his master's certificate in 1907. At the beginning of 1912, Ritscher gained a place in the newly created Seehandbuchwerk of the Navy Office.

Ritscher was skipper of the "German Arctic Expedition" of 1912–1913, under the command of Herbert Schröder-Stranz, which departed from Tromsø in the motor vessel Herzog Ernst for a preliminary reconnaissance of a planned navigation of the Northeast Passage. He also took over the leadership of the airborne survey of the expedition and obtained a pilot licence. The expedition failed whilst attempting the crossing of the Nordaustlandet island in northeastern Spitsbergen archipelago, because of poor equipment, misjudged weather, and starting too late in the year. Ritscher marched over 210 kilometres (130 mi) in seven and a half days, to the settlement of Longyearbyen. Search expeditions were sent after his message about the fate of the Schroeder-Stranz expedition and saved six of the fourteen missing expedition members.

During the First World War, Ritscher made reconnaissance flights in support of Marine units in Flanders. After the war he worked as an independent businessman and in 1925 worked as a specialist in aerial navigation with Lufthansa.

In 1934, Ritscher amicably divorced his Jewish wife Susan née Loewenthal. The reason given is presumed to be that Ritscher did not want to jeopardize his career opportunities at the War Ministry.

In 1933, Ritscher became an officer in command of the Navy. In 1938, he became head of the German Antarctic Expedition 1938/39, with a mandate to set up a base for the German whaling fleet, carry out air exploration and claim territory. During this expedition he flew over an area of about 600,000 square kilometres (230,000 sq mi) with two Dornier Do J II flying boats, launched from a steam catapult on the expedition ship. Around 11,000 aerial photographs were taken.

At the outbreak of the Second World War, Ritscher was preparing another expedition with improved ski-planes, which was cancelled. In addition, in early January 1941, Ritscher himself had to report as a captain for war service in the English Channel. During the war he was taken prisoner by the British and was released in August 1945.

After the Second World War, in 1949, Ritscher was classified as a Category V exonerated person, in his Denazification process.

From 1951 on he continued as chairman of the "Association for the promotion of the Archive for Polar Research Inc.", which was renamed in 1959 to the West German Society of Polar Research Association.

On March 30, 1963, Ritscher died in Hamburg and was subsequently buried in his birthplace.

== Awards ==
- 1959: Grand Federal Cross of Merit
- 1959: Silver Kirchenpauer Medal of the Geographical Society in Hamburg
- The Ritschergipfel and the Ritscher Highlands in East Antarctica have been named after him.

== Works ==
- Preliminary Report on the German Antarctic Expedition 1938/39. - Ann. Hydrog. and Marit. Meteorol. 67, August-booklet. Inside: Overview table of the work area of the German Antarctic Expedition 1938-39: Neuschwabenland: 1:1.500.000 - 1 May / June 1939.
- German Antarctic Expedition 1938/39 with the base plane of Lufthansa AG M.S. "Swabia". - 1 Band, Scientific and flying experiences, Koehler & Amelang; Leipzig 1942nd
- German Antarctic Expedition 1938/39 with the base plane of Lufthansa AG M.S. "Swabia". - 2 Band, Scientific Results. Geographical and Cartographic Institute "Mundus", Hamburg, 1954–58.

== See also ==
- Third German Antarctic Expedition 1938/39
- New Swabia
- List of Antarctic expeditions
- List of polar explorers
