= Isingsalen Saddle =

Isingsalen Saddle (72°20′S 1°2′E) is an ice saddle between Isingen Mountain and Salknappen Peak in the Sverdrup Mountains of Queen Maud Land, Antarctica. It was photographed from the air by the Third German Antarctic Expedition (1938–39). It was mapped by Norwegian cartographers from surveys and air photos by the Norwegian–British–Swedish Antarctic Expedition (1949–52) and from air photos by the Norwegian expedition (1958–59) and named Isingsalen (the icing saddle).
