= Horgebest Peak =

Mountain in Queen Maud Land, Antarctica

Horgebest Peak (72°34′S 0°27′E) is a peak just east of Fred Cirque in the Roots Heights, in the Sverdrup Mountains of Queen Maud Land, Antarctica. It was photographed from the air by the Third German Antarctic Expedition (1938–39), was mapped by Norwegian cartographers from surveys and air photos by the Norwegian–British–Swedish Antarctic Expedition (1949–52) and from air photos by the Norwegian expedition (1958–59) and named Horgebest (mountain beast).
