= Paulsen Mountains =

Antarctica mountainrange

Paulsen Mountains (72°10′S 1°21′E) is a mountain range including Brattskarvet Mountain, Vendeholten Mountain and Tverrveggen Ridge, located in the northern part of the Sverdrup Mountains in Queen Maud Land. Discovered by the German Antarctic Expedition under Alfred Ritscher, 1938–39, and named for Karl-Heinz Paulsen, oceanographer on the expedition.
