= Kvitskarvhalsen Saddle =

Kvitskarvhalsen Saddle (72°30′S 0°51′E) is an ice saddle between Mount Krüger and the Robin Heights in the Sverdrup Mountains of Queen Maud Land, Antarctica. It was photographed from the air by the Third German Antarctic Expedition (1938–39). The feature was mapped by Norwegian cartographers from surveys and air photos by the Norwegian–British–Swedish Antarctic Expedition (1949–52) and air photos by the Norwegian expedition (1958–59) and named Kvitskarvhalsen (the white mountain neck).
