= Brattskarvbrekka Pass =

Brattskarvbrekka Pass (72°10′S 1°25′E) is an east-west pass between Brattskarvet Mountain and Vendeholten Mountain, in the Sverdrup Mountains, Queen Maud Land. It was photographed from the air by the Third German Antarctic Expedition (1938–39), and mapped by Norwegian cartographers from surveys and air photos by the Norwegian–British–Swedish Antarctic Expedition (1949–52) and from air photos by the Norwegian expedition (1958–59) and named Brattskarvbrekka (the "steep mountain slope").
