= Brekkerista Ridge =

Ridge in Queen Maud Land, Antarctica

Brekkerista Ridge (72°14′S 0°18′W) is a ridge 2 nautical miles (4 km) northeast of the summit of Jutulrora Mountain (separated by Gangbrekka Pass) in the Sverdrup Mountains of Queen Maud Land. It was plotted from air photos by the Third German Antarctic Expedition (1938–39). It was remapped by Norwegian cartographers from surveys and air photos by the Norwegian–British–Swedish Antarctic Expedition (1949–52) and from air photos by the Norwegian expedition (1958–59) and named "Brekkerista" (the "slope ridge").

== See also ==
- Ottehallet Slope
