= Dalsnatten Crag =

Cliff of Queen Maud Land

Coordinates: 72°31′S 0°30′E

Dalsnatten Crag is a rock crag on the east side of Skarsdalen Valley in the Sverdrup Mountains of Queen Maud Land. It was photographed from the air by the Third German Antarctic Expedition (1938–39). It was mapped by Norwegian cartographers from surveys and air photos by the Norwegian–British–Swedish Antarctic Expedition (1949–52) and from air photos by the Norwegian expedition (1958–59) and named Dalsnatten (the valley crag).
