= Isingufsa Bluff =

Rock bluff on Isingen Mountain, Queen Maud Laud, Antarctica

Isingufsa Bluff (72°21′S 1°13′E) is a rock bluff forming the northeast corner of Isingen Mountain in the Sverdrup Mountains of Queen Maud Land, Antarctica. It was photographed from the air by the Third German Antarctic Expedition (1938–39). It was mapped by Norwegian cartographers from surveys and air photos by the Norwegian–British–Swedish Antarctic Expedition (1949–52) and from air photos by the Norwegian expedition (1958–59) and named Isingufsa (the icing bluff).
