= Oppkuven Peak =

Mountain in Queen Maud Land, Antarctica

Oppkuven Peak (72°37′S 0°24′E) is a peak 2 nautical miles (3.7 km) north of Gavlen Ridge in the Roots Heights, Sverdrup Mountains, in Queen Maud Land. Photographed from the air by the German Antarctic Expedition (1938–39). Mapped by Norwegian cartographers from surveys and air photos by Norwegian-British-Swedish Antarctic Expedition (NBSAE) (1949–52) and air photos by the Norwegian expedition (1958–59) and named Oppkuven (the ascent peak).
