= Skimten Hill =

Hill in Antarctica

Skimten Hill (72°13′S 0°17′E) is a small rock hill 5 nautical miles (9 km) north of Mount Roer in the Sverdrup Mountains, Queen Maud Land. Photographed from the air by the German Antarctic Expedition (1938–39). Mapped by Norwegian cartographers from surveys and air photos by Norwegian-British-Swedish Antarctic Expedition (NBSAE) (1949–52) and named Skimten (the glimpse), presumably because only a small portion of the hill can be seen protruding through the ice sheet.
