= Låghamaren Cliff =

Cliff in Antarctica

Låghamaren Cliff (72°30′S 0°30′E) is a rock cliff forming the northwest end of the Hamrane Heights in the Sverdrup Mountains of Queen Maud Land, Antarctica. It was photographed from the air by the Third German Antarctic Expedition (1938–39), and was mapped by Norwegian cartographers from surveys and air photos by the Norwegian–British–Swedish Antarctic Expedition (1949–52) and air photos by the Norwegian expedition (1958–59) and named Låghamaren (the low crag).
