= Gangbrekka Pass =

Mountain Pass in Antarctica

Gangbrekka Pass (72°15′S 0°20′W) is a mountain pass between Jutulrora Mountain and Brekkerista Ridge in the Sverdrup Mountains of Queen Maud Land of Antarctica. It was mapped by Norwegian cartographers from surveys and air photos by the Norwegian–British–Swedish Antarctic Expedition (1949–52) and from air photos by the Norwegian expedition (1958–59) and named Gangbrekka (the passage slope).
