= Dyna Hill =

Coordinates: 72°22′S 0°40′E

Dyna Hill is a hill 2 nautical miles (4 km) west of Kvithovden Peak in the Sverdrup Mountains of Queen Maud Land. It was photographed from the air by the Third German Antarctic Expedition (1938–39). It was mapped by Norwegian cartographers from surveys and air photos by the Norwegian–British–Swedish Antarctic Expedition (1949–52) and from air photos by the Norwegian expedition (1958–59) and named Dyna (the dune).
