= Gordon Peak =

Mountain in Antarctica

Coordinates: 72°26′S 0°32′E

Gordon Peak is a rock peak marking the northwest end of the Robin Heights in the Sverdrup Mountains of Queen Maud Land, Antarctica. It was photographed from the air by the Third German Antarctic Expedition (1938–39). It was mapped by Norwegian cartographers from surveys and air photos by the Norwegian–British–Swedish Antarctic Expedition (NBSAE) (1949–52) and from air photos by the Norwegian expedition (1958–59). It was named for Robin de Quetterville Gordon, third in command and physicist with the NBSAE.
