= Fred Roots =

Canadian geologist (1923–2016)

Fred Roots OC FRSC
- Born: Ernest Frederick Roots; 5 July 1923; Salmon Arm, British Columbia
- Died: 18 October 2016 (aged 93); East Sooke, British Columbia
- Education: University of British Columbia; Princeton University
- Occupations: Geologist, explorer, educator and public servant
- Years active: 1945–2016
- Organization(s): Scott Polar Research Institute; Geological Survey of Canada; Polar Continental Shelf Program; Environment Canada; Students on Ice

Ernest Frederick "Fred" Roots OC FRSC (5 July 1923 – 18 October 2016) was a Canadian geologist, polar explorer, educator and public servant. After graduating with undergraduate and master's degrees in geology from the University of British Columbia and a doctorate from Princeton University, Roots joined the Scott Polar Research Institute and was appointed Chief Geologist for the 1949 to 1952 Norwegian–British–Swedish Antarctic Expedition. During the expedition, in addition to ground-breaking geological and glaciological research studies, he made a 189-day, unsupported dog sled journey across the continent; a record that still stood at the time of his death over six decades later. On his return to Canada he joined the Geological Survey of Canada with whom he served as a field geologist until 1958, when he left to help found the Polar Continental Shelf Program. After 14 years with PCSP, Roots left to act as science advisor to the newly created federal Department of the Environment, where he remained on staff until 1989. After retirement, Roots remained an active participant in polar research, and also became a key mentor within the Students on Ice educational program. He continued to participate in expeditions for Students on Ice well into his tenth decade, his last being to Greenland only two months before his death.

== Early life ==
Fred Roots was born in Salmon Arm, in the Shuswap Country of southern British Columbia, Canada, on 5 July 1923. He was the second child of Margaret and Ernest Roots. His father was an engineer with the Canadian Pacific Railway, and while Fred was a small child the family moved to Banff, Alberta, when Ernest was appointed Chief Engineer at the company's Banff Springs Hotel. As a result, Roots spent much of his childhood surrounded by the high ranges of the Canadian Rockies. Growing up among the mountains instilled in Roots a lasting love of outdoor exploration and geology.

However, when Roots was only eight years old his father died from typhoid fever, leaving his mother to bring up the family's three children on her own. As a young high school student Roots was appointed as an assistant meteorological observer for the Banff National Park. His duties involved climbing to the summit of a mountain within the park, to service the weather observation station located there. Later in his high school career he moved west to Vancouver, and completed his schooling at Vancouver Technical College.

During the Second World War he was a student the University of British Columbia, from where he graduated with a bachelor's degree in geological engineering. He remained at the same institution to continue his postgraduate education, and completed a master's degree thesis on the geology of the Aiken Lake map-area, in the Cassiar Mountains of northern British Columbia, in 1947. It was during this work that he first became involved with the Geological Survey of Canada (GSC), as he worked alongside the survey's staff geologist J.E. Armstrong to map the mineral-rich district. The same district provided the subject matter for his doctoral research which followed at Princeton University, from where he graduated with a Ph.D. degree in 1950.

== Polar and Himalayan exploration ==
In 1949, at the age of 26, Roots was appointed Chief Geologist for the Norwegian–British–Swedish Antarctic Expedition, the first exploratory expedition to Antarctica to involve an international team of scientists. Roots's role was to study the geology of Queen Maud Land, which he showed was a conjugate part of and had once been attached to the east coast of southern Africa. In addition to his geological observations, Roots also helped to show that the glaciers of Antarctica had once been much more extensive, and that the phenomenon of climate change was a global effect and not limited to discrete locations. During the course of the expedition, Roots undertook a 189-day, unsupported dog sled journey across the continent. This feat of endurance remained a record even at the time of his death, over six decades later. For the rest of his life, Roots regularly wore a belt made from leather taken from the traces of his lead dog of that expedition, Rachel.

== Public service ==
Following his return from the southern hemisphere in 1952, Roots completed the remainder of his fellowship at the Scott Polar Research Institute at Cambridge University. It was during this time that he met and fell in love with one of the Institute's librarians, June Blomfield, herself a highly educated geographer and passionate outdoorswoman.

=== Geological Survey of Canada ===
At the end of his fellowship in Cambridge, Roots was appointed as a field geologist with the GSC, based at the survey's head office in Ottawa, Ontario. His first major publication for the survey in 1953 was essentially a reworking of his extensive research in the Cassiar Mountains, conducted during his MSc and PhD studies, but he rapidly became a part of the GSC's active field research programs at the time. Fred and June eventually married in 1955, and June moved out to Canada to be with her new husband.

Under Y.O. Fortier, he was co-leader of the GSC's Operation Franklin in 1955, that first established the potential for economic petroleum deposits in the high Arctic islands of Canada. Between 1956 and 1958 Roots was, in turn, head of Operation Stikine, the GSC's first systematic attempt to map the geology of the northern portion of the Canadian Cordillera of British Columbia and Yukon.

=== Polar Continental Shelf Program ===
In 1958, Roots left the GSC to become the founding head of the Government of Canada's new Polar Continental Shelf Program (PCSP). PCSP was set up to promote research in Canada's Arctic north, principally by providing logistical and practical support for government and academic scientists active in the area, and Roots had largely been responsible for conceiving of and establishing the novel organization. During his time with PCSP, Roots was a key part of the team that outlined the need for a permanent establishment to conduct research on the icefields of the Kluane National Park of southwest Yukon, part of the largest non-polar icefield in the world. In the years that followed, the Kluane Lake Research Station also became a hub for exploration across Canada's north, and Roots himself used it as a base from which to organize expeditions through the Saint Elias Mountains, Canada's highest mountain range, as part of the Canadian Centennial celebrations in 1967. Roots served as head of PCSP for 14 years, until 1971, when he left to join what was to eventually become Environment Canada.

=== Department of the Environment ===
At the time, the newly established government department was in a state of flux. As science advisor to the Minister of the Environment, Roots was instrumental in helping design the department's structure and objectives, and has been credited with giving it "the scientific credibility, the moral authority and knowledge that enabled it to play its role." He remained with Environment Canada until his retirement from public service in 1989, and subsequently retained a role with the department as an emeritus scientist and advisor until 2003.

== Life after retirement ==
Following his retirement, Roots and his wife moved back to British Columbia from their home in Gatineau, Quebec.

In the mid-1990s, at a meeting of the Canadian Polar Commission in Ottawa, Roots met explorer and educator Geoff Green. At the time, Green was attempting to launch a new educational initiative aimed at providing opportunities for secondary school students to visit and explore polar regions. The scheme, Students on Ice, struck a chord with Roots and he agreed to support its formation. Green has credited Roots with being one of the program's "founding fathers". Over the following two decades, Roots participated in many polar expeditions for Students on Ice, and acted as a mentor to hundreds of students from around the world.

Roots's final Arctic exploration was as part of a Students on Ice expedition to Greenland in August 2016. Later the same month he travelled to New York to receive the Explorers Club Medal from The Explorers Club. Previous recipients of the award include explorers Sir Edmund Hillary and Roald Amundsen, primatologist Jane Goodall, and astronaut Neil Armstrong.

E.F. "Fred" Roots died peacefully in his sleep at home in East Sooke on Vancouver Island, British Columbia, on 18 October 2016. He was 93 years old. He was survived by June and four of their five children. He was predeceased earlier the same year by his son, Charlie Roots, who had himself been a geologist and explorer with the Geological Survey of Canada.

== Awards and recognition ==
Map showing the location of Roots Heights – named for Fred Roots in 1966 – in Queen Maud Land, Antarctica

During the course of his research career, after retirement, and in recognition of his exploration in both the northern and southern polar regions, various academic societies and associations conferred distinctions upon Roots:

- Ness Award of the Royal Geographical Society (1955)
- Fellow of the Arctic Institute of North America (1955)
- Polar Medal awarded by the Sovereign of the United Kingdom (1956)
- Founder's Medal of the Royal Geographical Society (1965)
- Massey Medal of the Royal Canadian Geographical Society (1979)
- Officer of the Order of Canada (1987)
- Fellow of the Royal Society of Canada (1990)
- Explorers Club Medal of The Explorers Club (2016)

=== Namesake locations ===
In recognition of his exemplary service in the exploration and scientific investigation of the Antarctic continent, a number of places and geographic features on the landmass have been named in honour of Roots. Roots Heights (Norwegian: Rootshorga; 72°37′S 00°27′E), named in 1966, is an area of high ground at the top of an ice-free, flat-topped mountain, approximately central within the Sverdrup Mountains of Queen Maud Land. On the western side of Roots Heights is a large glacial cirque, named Fred Cirque (Norwegian: Fredbotnen; 72°34′S 00°25′E) also in 1966. Both features were mapped by Norwegian cartographers during the course of the Norwegian–British–Swedish Antarctic Expedition for which Roots was Chief Geologist. Multiple biographical articles and obituaries claim that an entire range of mountains on Antarctica is named for Roots, but there appears to be no evidence for this in gazetteers and geographic name directories.

=== Namesake fossil ===
During his master's thesis research in the Aiken Lake area of northern British Columbia, Roots collected samples of fossils to assist in correlation and dating of the various rock units that he examined there. One of these samples contained a sponge reef fauna which included a species of Archaeocyatha that had not yet been formally described. Fortunately for Roots, on the faculty of the Department of Geology at the University of British Columbia was Vladimir Okulitch, a paleontologist who specialized in Archaeocytha fossils. Okulitch named the species Protopharetra rootsi, meaning 'Roots's first quiver', recognizing both the finder of the fossil as well as its shape.
