= Rømlingsletta Flat =

Rømlingsletta Flat (72°16′S 1°7′E) is an ice-covered, flattish area of about 40 square miles, lying northward of the foot of Isingen Mountain, in the Sverdrup Mountains of Queen Maud Land. It was photographed from the air by the German Antarctic Expedition (1938–39) and mapped by Norwegian cartographers from surveys and air photos by the Norwegian-British-Swedish Antarctic Expedition (1949–52) and air photos by the Norwegian expedition (1958–59) and named Rømlingsletta ("the fugitive's plain").
