= Daniela Liggett =

Germany researcher based in New Zealand

- Citizenship: New Zealand
- Education: University of Canterbury
- Scientific career
- Fields: Tourism Regulation, Antarctic Policy
- Thesis: Tourism in the Antarctic- Modi Operandi and Regulatory Effectiveness (2008)

Daniela Haase Liggett is an Antarctic researcher and social scientist from Germany, focused on antarctic tourism and environmental management, as well as international research coordination. She is a professor at the University of Canterbury as the head of the School of Earth and Environment. Liggett is a leading expert in many Antarctic policy and research organizations like PCAPS, APECS, SCARS.

== Education ==
Liggett received a Management Bachelor of Science at Otto-von-Guericke University Magdeburg in 2003. Then a Master's Degree in Environment and Development from the University of Manchester in 2004. Finally, a Doctorate of Philosophy in Antarctic Studies from the University of Canterbury in 2008 where she completed a thesis on the government regulatory effectiveness of antarctic tourism.

== Career and impact ==
Liggett is part of the Policy Interface Working Group for Antarctic Platform, New Zealand's government funded research platform in Antarctica. She is co-chair of the Polar Coupled Analysis and Prediction for Services for the World Meteorological Organization, where she emphasizes interdisciplinary research collaboration is necessary for the complicated nature of Antarctic policy and management. She advocates for greater tourism regulation in Antarctica, like the availability of rescue ships in case of emergency and general consideration of the carbon footprint of antarctic tourism.

Liggett directed the "COVID-19 Project", SCAR's research project on the impact of the 2019 pandemic on human interaction with the continent. In her article, she explores governmental response to the pandemic regarding the continent. Liggett argues that slow response to COVID-19 highlighted governmental bodies like the ATS's in-effectiveness.

Liggett also contributed to "Antarctic Futures: Human Engagement with the Antarctic Environment," a book exploring the human environmental impacts, management strategies and future reality for Antarctica. Liggett co-authored the section 'Strategic Thinking for the Antarctic Environment: The Use of Assessment Tools in Governance,' where she argues that more strategic management in Antarctic governing is necessary for its sustainable use and future.

== Selected works ==
- Daniela Liggett et al. , "How the COVID-19 pandemic signaled the demise of Antarctic exceptionalism." Sci. Adv.10, eadk4424 (2024). DOI:10.1126/sciadv.adk4424
- Kennicutt II, M.C., Chown, S., Cassano, J., D. Liggett et al. (2014) "A roadmap for Antarctic and Southern Ocean science for the next two decades and beyond" Antarctic Science 27(1), 3–18 (2015) doi:10.1017/S0954102014000674
- Liggett, D., McIntosh, A., Thompson, A., et al. (2011). "From frozen continent to tourism hotspot? Five decades of Antarctic tourism development and management, and a glimpse into the future." Tourism Management 32 (2), 357–366 (2011) ISSN 0261-5177, https://doi.org/10.1016/j.tourman.2010.03.005.
