= José Carlos Caetano Xavier =

Portuguese scientist and polar explorer (born 1975)

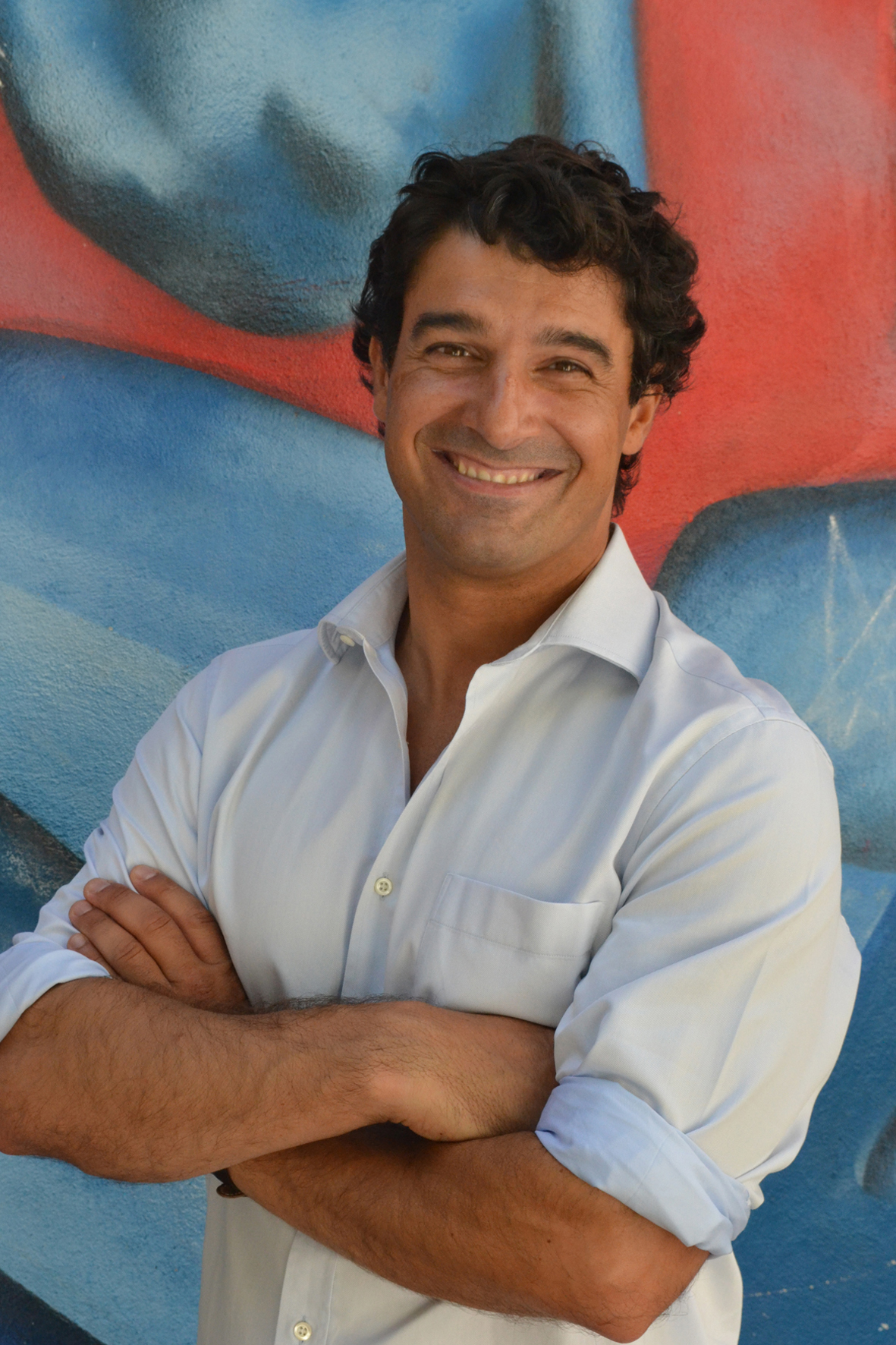
- Born: 30 April 1975 (age 50); Coimbra, Portugal
- Occupation(s): Scientist and polar explorer
- Website: cientistapolarjxavier.blogspot.com

José Carlos Caetano Xavier is a Portuguese scientist (marine biologist) and polar explorer.

== Early life and education ==
Xavier graduated from University of Algarve with a master's degree in Marine Biology in 1997 and earned a Ph.D. from the University of Cambridge (Queen's college) in 1999. As of 2012 he has carried out seven research expeditions in Antarctica since 1997.

== Career ==
Xavier is a professor and principal investigator of the Institute of Marine Research of the University of Coimbra(Portugal) and at the British Antarctic Survey.

He was one of the leading scientists for the implementation of the national research program PROPOLAR and of the educational program LATITUDE60!, during the International Polar Year.

Xavier co-founded the Association of Polar Early Career Scientists and is also a member of the Education and Outreach sub-committee of the International Polar Year.

He was involved in the institutional efforts for Portugal to join the Scientific Committee for Antarctic Research (2006), European Polar Board (2007) and signing the Antarctic Treaty (2010). He co-led Portugal's polar science, education and outreach activities during the International Polar Year.

=== Investigation interests ===
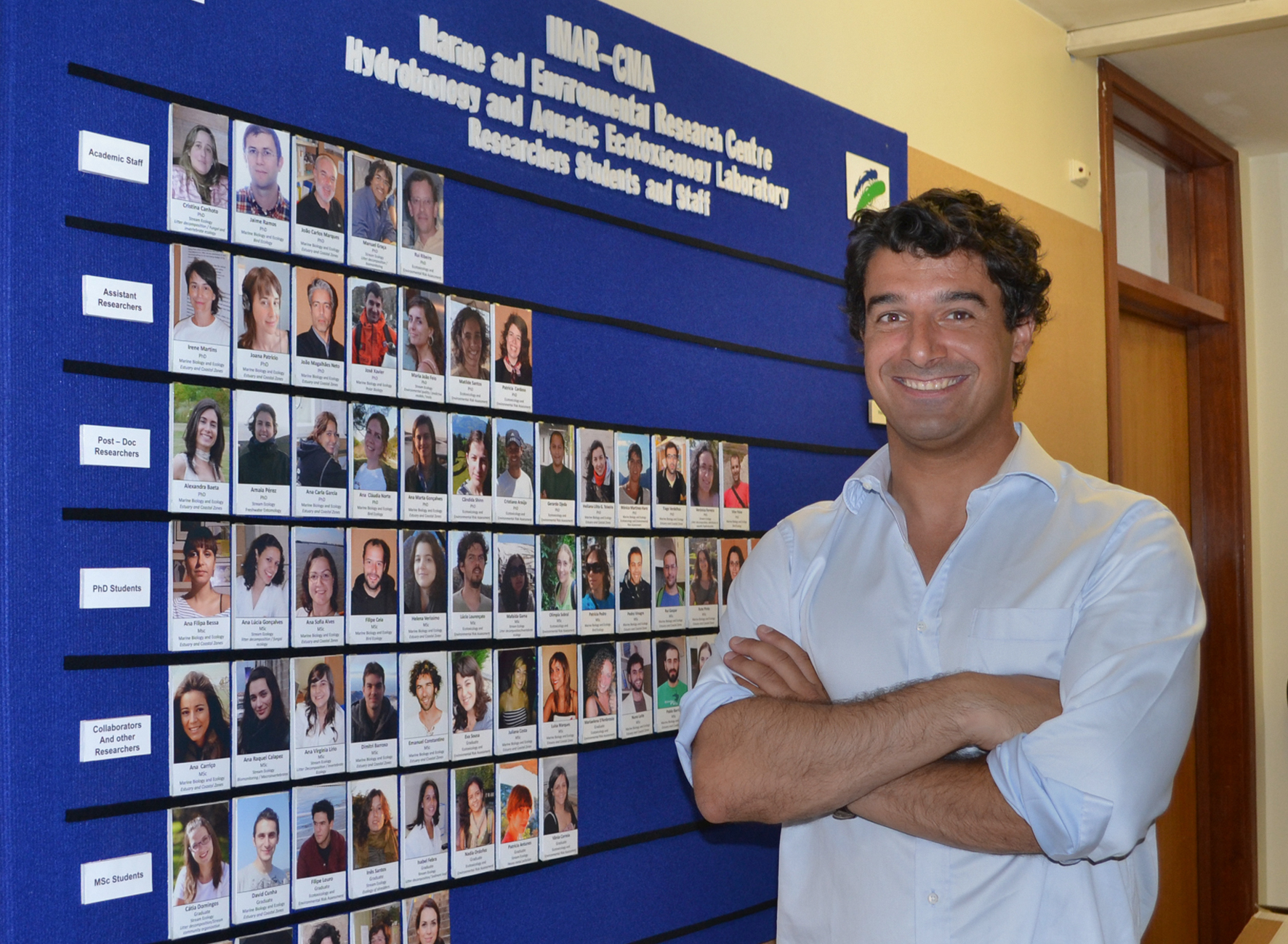
José Xavier in the Institute of Marine Research of the University of Coimbra

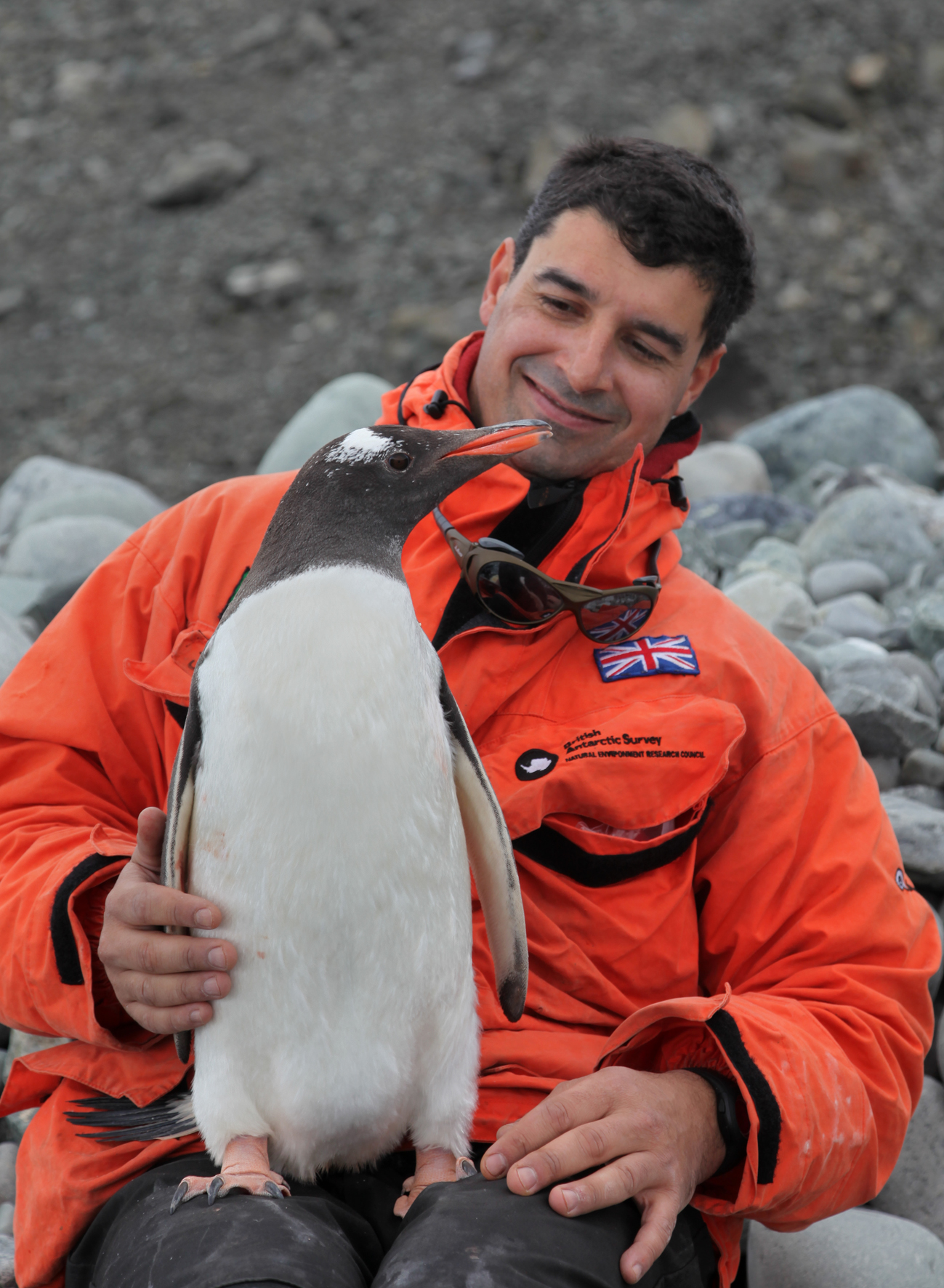
José Xavier in Antarctic

== Awards ==
In 2011, Xavier was the youngest recipient of the Martha T. Muse Prize for his work on science and politics in the Antarctic

== Books ==
- Xavier, José C. (2014). Experiência Antárctica Relatos de um Cientista Polar Português. gradiva. ISBN 978-989-616-572-7.
- Xavier, José C.; Vieira, Gonçalo T.; Canário, Adelino (2006). Portuguese Science Strategy for the International Polar Year. Portuguese Committee for the International Polar Year 2007-08.
- Xavier, JC; Cherel, Y (2009). Cephalopod beak guide for the Southern Ocean. Jose Xavier. GGKEY:B12NB0YD37G.
