= Mount Brandt =

Mountain in Queen Maud Land, Antarctica

Mount Brandt (72°10′S 1°7′E) is a nunatak, 1,540 metres (5,050 ft) high, which is the northernmost feature in Romlingane Peaks, in the Sverdrup Mountains of Queen Maud Land. The name Brandt-Berg after Emil Brandt, sailor with the expedition, was applied in this area by the Third German Antarctic Expedition (1938–39) under Alfred Ritscher. The correlation of the name with this nunatak may be arbitrary but is recommended for the sake of international uniformity and historical continuity.
