= Tvora =

Mountain in Queen Maud Land, Antarctica

Tvora (72°10′S 0°5′W) is a mountain with two north-trending spurs (or salients), about 3 nautical miles (6 km) east of Straumsvola Mountain in the Sverdrup Mountains, Queen Maud Land. Plotted from air photos by the German Antarctic Expedition (1938–39). Remapped by Norwegian cartographers from surveys and air photos by Norwegian-British-Swedish Antarctic Expedition (NBSAE) (1949–52) and air photos by the Norwegian expedition (1958–59) and named Tvora (two ridges).
