= Nils Plain =

Ice plain in Queen Maud Land, Antarctica

Nils Plain (72°7′S 0°27′E) is an ice plain of about 25 nautical miles (46 km) extent, lying northward of Mount Roer in the Sverdrup Mountains, Queen Maud Land. Mapped by Norwegian cartographers from surveys and air photos by Norwegian-British-Swedish Antarctic Expedition (NBSAE) (1949–52) and air photos by the Norwegian expedition (1958–59). Named for Nils Roer, surveyor of the NBSAE.
