= Storkvaeven Cirque =

Cirque in Antarctica

Storkvaeven Cirque (72°42′S 0°9′E) is a cirque on the northwest side of Nupskapa Peak, near the south end of the Sverdrup Mountains in Queen Maud Land. Mapped by Norwegian cartographers from surveys and air photos by Norwegian-British-Swedish Antarctic Expedition (NBSAE) (1949–52) and air photos by the Norwegian expedition (1958–59) and named Storkvaeven.
