= Earthwatch =

Earthwatch may refer to

- Earthwatch Institute, an international environmental charity that brings individuals from all walks of life together with world-class scientists to work on expeditions for the good of the planet.
- EarthWatch Incorporated, now DigitalGlobe, a commercial vendor of space imagery and geospatial content
- United Nations System-wide Earthwatch, a United Nations mechanism for sharing environmental information among agencies, published on a central website
- Earthwatch (TV series), an Australian children's television show from 1979 into the early 1980s
