= Hei Glacier =

Glacier in Antarctica

- Location of Queen Maud Land in Antarctica

- Location within Antarctica
- Type: cirque glacier
- Location: Queen Maud Land
- Coordinates: 72°29′S 0°35′E
- Thickness: unknown
- Terminus: Sverdrup Mountains
- Status: unknown

Hei Glacier (72°29′S 0°35′E) is a glacier flowing northwest between the Hamrane Heights and the Robin Heights in the Sverdrup Mountains of Queen Maud Land, Antarctica. It was photographed from the air by the Third German Antarctic Expedition (1938–39). It was mapped by Norwegian cartographers from surveys and air photos by the Norwegian–British–Swedish Antarctic Expedition (1949–52) and from air photos by the Norwegian expedition (1958–59) and named Heibreen (the upland glacier).

== See also ==
- List of glaciers in the Antarctic
- Glaciology
