= Louise Huffman =

American teacher

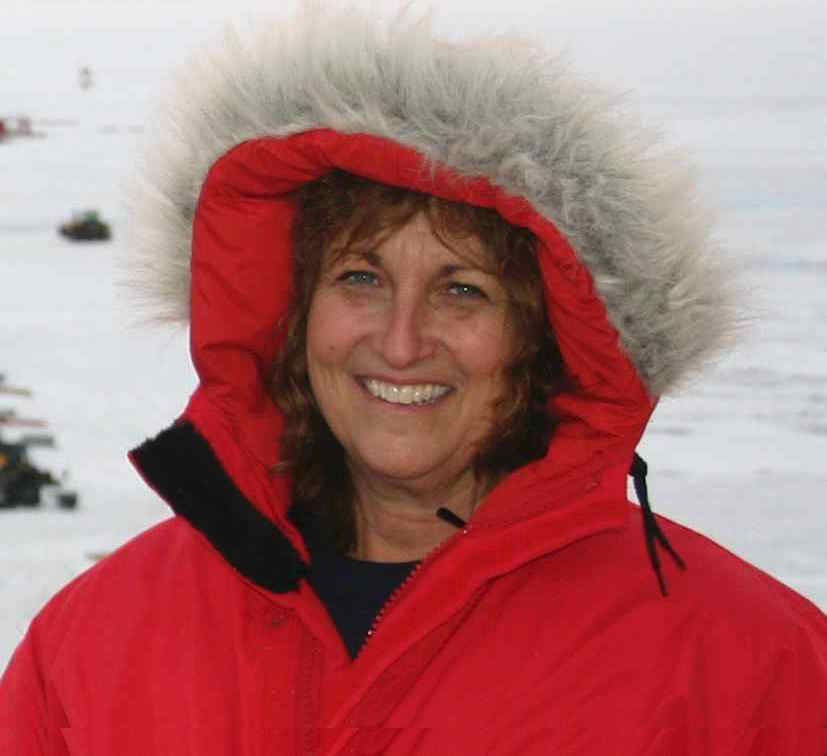
- Louise Huffman near McMurdo Station
- Born: July 24, 1951
- Education: BS Southern Illinois University-Carbondale; MS Northern Illinois University
- Occupations: Director, Education and Outreach for the US Ice Drilling Program Office

Louise Tolle Huffman (born July 24, 1951) is an American teacher with over 30 years of teaching experience with many years focused on polar science and climate studies, and has written educational outreach books and articles on Antarctica. She is the Director of Education and Outreach for the US Ice Drilling Program Office (IDPO), responsible for outreach efforts highlighting IDPO scientists and their research results.

== Early life and education ==
Huffman began her career as an educator for grades 1–8, including special and highly gifted education. Huffman earned her BS from Southern Illinois University-Carbondale in 1973 and her MS from Northern Illinois University in 1979. In 1989 Huffman attended a National Science and Teachers Association (NSTA) convention and was inspired by polar explorer Will Steger. Since 1989, Huffman has worked with polar researchers and explorers to communicate the results of their studies to non-scientific audiences, including chairing the International Polar Year (IPY) Formal Education Subcommittee of the International Polar Office's Education and Outreach Committee.

== Career and impact ==
Huffman has 34 years of teaching experience, especially in schools in Naperville, Illinois. In 1989, her interests turned to polar science and education when she and her students followed the Trans-Antarctic Expedition (TAE) through a pre-World-Wide-Web internet connection. Related to TAE, Huffman taught workshops for international polar educators for several summers at the Antarctic Institute at the Center for Global Environmental Education at Hamline University, St. Paul, MN, and co-authored a collection of chapters about the adventure learning and the projects created by the Institute's international educators, Project Circles: World School for Adventure Learning. She worked with the Chicago Museum of Science and Industry as they produced the Omnimax movie, Antarctica, and co-authored the companion book, Antarctica: A Living Classroom

During summer breaks from ~1995, Huffman served as a facilitator in the Golden Apple Foundation Summer Science Inquiry for Teachers workshops held at the Chicago Museum of Science and Industry and the University of Chicago. Huffman has created and facilitated many climate change and polar science workshops for teachers.

In 2003, Huffman was chosen to participate in the National Science Foundation's Teachers Experiencing the Arctic and Antarctic Program (TEA) and spent the 2002–03 research season in Antarctica with Diane McKnight’s Stream Team which is part of the McMurdo Dry Valleys LTER (Long Term Ecological Research) project. Jenny Baeseman was the leader of the team and supervisor of Huffman for the season. Her responsibilities included assisting the research in all capacities as well as sending lessons, pictures and blogs off-ice to classrooms around the world that were following the expedition. Another responsibility was to mentor other teachers in polar science, Transferring the Polar Research Experience: Mentoring.

In 2007, Huffman retired from teaching and accepted the position as Coordinator of Education and Outreach for ANDRILL, (ANtarctic geological DRILLing), located at the University of Nebraska-Lincoln where she was responsible for all education and outreach projects including the Climate Change Student Summits and the creation of resources for educators like The Environmental Literacy Framework with a Focus on Climate Change and Antarctica: A Journey of Discovery. Other responsibilities with ANDRILL included communicating polar geoscience and climate change science to non-technical audiences and to support formal and informal education programs.

As part of Huffman’s ANDRILL tenure, she led the ARISE (ANDRILL Research Immersion for Science Educators) program and facilitated the experience before, during and after eight international educators’ research trip to Antarctica.

Following the International Polar Year (IPY 2007–2012), Huffman worked with a team of researchers and educators to found the Polar Educators International (PEI) organisation and served as President, on the Executive Council and on the Council. Having worked on planning the IPY workshops for educators in Oslo and Montreal, she helped create PEI International Workshops for Educators: Bringing Polar Science to Classrooms which have been held in Coimbra Portugal, Hannover Germany.

In 2016, Huffman accepted the position as Director of Education and Outreach for the US Ice Drilling Program Office (IDPO), an NSF program office responsible for coordinating and supporting US ice drilling in Greenland and Antarctica. Education and outreach responsibilities include creating resources and professional development opportunities for transferring ice science discoveries to classrooms and to non-science audiences, encouraging diversity in STEM activities through the School of Ice, working with graduate students to communicate their research, and highlighting ice scientists and their work in highly visible activities while helping them tailor messages to different audiences.

== Awards and honors ==
- Invited speaker at Southern Illinois University-Carbondale for a series of talks during the event Antarctica: Imagined Geographies 2012
- Golden Apple Award of Excellence in Teaching 2003
- Illinois Science Teachers Association Award of Excellence in Science Teaching 1992 and 1996
- 1998, 2001 Who’s Who Among America’s Teachers
- 1997–present Who’s Who in America, Who’s Who in the Midwest, Who’s Who Among Women, and Who’s Who in the World
