= Fred Cirque =

Cirque in Antarctica

Fred Cirque (72°34′S 0°25′E) is a large cirque in the west side of Roots Heights, in the Sverdrup Mountains of Queen Maud Land, Antarctica. It was photographed from the air by the Third German Antarctic Expedition (1938–39). It was mapped by Norwegian cartographers from surveys and air photos by the Norwegian–British–Swedish Antarctic Expedition (NBSAE) (1949–52) and from air photos by the Norwegian expedition (1958–59). It was named for Ernest Frederick Roots, chief geologist with the NBSAE.
