= Alan Peak =

Mountain in Queen Maud Land, Antarctica

- Location within Antarctica

Highest point
- Elevation: 2,086 m (6,844 ft)
- Coordinates: 72°39′S 0°11′E

Geography
- Location: Sverdrup Mountains in Queen Maud Land

Alan Peak also known as Alanpiggen, is a peak at the west side of the mouth of Reece Valley, in the south part of the Sverdrup Mountains in Queen Maud Land, Antarctica. Plotted from air photos by the Third German Antarctic Expedition (1938–39). Remapped by Norwegian cartographers from surveys and air photos by the Norwegian-British-Swedish Antarctic Expedition (NBSAE) (1949–1952) and air photos by the Norwegian expedition (1958–59). Named for Alan William Reece, geologist with the NBSAE (1949–52) and earlier with the Falkland Islands Dependencies Survey.
