= Joungane Peaks =

Mountains in Queen Maud Land, Antarctica

The Joungane Peaks (72°4′S 0°17′W) are a line of about four small peaks just north of Storjoen Peak in the Sverdrup Mountains of Queen Maud Land, Antarctica. They were plotted from air photos by the Third German Antarctic Expedition (1938–39), remapped by Norwegian cartographers from surveys and air photos by the Norwegian–British–Swedish Antarctic Expedition (1949–52) and from air photos by the Norwegian expedition (1958–59) and named Joungane.
