= Ottehallet Slope =

Ice slope in Queen Maud Land, Antarctica

Ottehallet Slope (72°12′S 0°13′W) is an ice slope between Straumsvola Mountain and Brekkerista Ridge in the Sverdrup Mountains of Queen Maud Land. Mapped by Norwegian cartographers from surveys and air photos by Norwegian-British-Swedish Antarctic Expedition (NBSAE) (1949–52) and air photos by the Norwegian expedition (1958–59) and named Ottehallet (the early-morning slope).
