= Tverrbrekka Pass =

Pass in Queen Maud Land, Antarctica

Coordinates: 72°14′S 1°19′E

Tverrbrekka Pass is an east–west pass through the Sverdrup Mountains between Vendeholten Mountain and Tverrveggen Ridge, in Queen Maud Land, Antarctica. Photographed from the air by the German Antarctic Expedition (1938–39). Mapped by Norwegian cartographers from surveys and air photos by Norwegian-British-Swedish Antarctic Expedition (NBSAE) (1949–52) and air photos by the Norwegian expedition (1958–59) and named Tverrbrekka (the transverse slope).
