= Ising Glacier =

Glacier in Antarctica

- Location of Queen Maud Land in Antarctica

- Location within Antarctica
- Location: Queen Maud Land
- Coordinates: 72°24′S 0°57′E
- Thickness: unknown
- Terminus: Sverdrup Mountains
- Status: unknown

Ising Glacier (72°24′S 0°57′E) is a glacier flowing northwest between Isingen Mountain and Kvitkjolen Ridge in the Sverdrup Mountains of Queen Maud Land, Antarctica. It was photographed from the air by the Third German Antarctic Expedition (1938–39). It was mapped by Norwegian cartographers from surveys and air photos by the Norwegian–British–Swedish Antarctic Expedition (1949–1952), led by John Schjelderup Giæver, and from air photos by the Norwegian expedition (1958–59) and named Isingbreen (the icing glacier).

== See also ==
- List of glaciers in the Antarctic
- Glaciology
