= Sørhausane Peaks =

Mountains in Queen Maud Land, Antarctica

Coordinates: 72°47′S 0°15′E

Sorhausane Peaks is a small cluster of peaks 2 nautical miles (3.7 km) south of Nupskapa Peak, at the south end of the Sverdrup Mountains in Queen Maud Land. Mapped by Norwegian cartographers from surveys and air photos by Norwegian-British-Swedish Antarctic Expedition (NBSAE) (1949–52) and air photos by the Norwegian expedition (1958–59) and named Sorhausane (the south peaks).
