= Students on Ice =

Canadian charitable organisation

Students on Ice Foundation (also known as SOI) is a Canadian charitable organisation that leads educational expeditions to the Arctic and Antarctic for international high school and university students. Its mandate is to provide youth, educators and scientists from around the world with learning and teaching opportunities in the polar regions, with the goal of fostering an understanding of, and commitment to building a more sustainable future.

== History ==
Students on Ice (SOI) was founded in 2000 by Geoff Green, a Canadian explorer and educator. Before founding the organization, Green had led numerous expeditions to the Arctic, Antarctica, and other destinations around the world. Believing that expeditions to the polar regions had the power to inspire and transform, he decided to create an organization aimed specifically at secondary school students that would provide them with learning opportunities in circumpolar regions. The objective of a Students on Ice expedition is to inspire and challenge youth at a critical time in their lives to think and act positively and proactively as global citizens. SOI creates attachments between the world and the young citizens who inhabit it by putting them physically in contact with issues relating to the planet's well-being. This concept is supported by the work of educational researchers such as David Sobel, David A. Gruenewald, and Gregory Smith, who argue that place-based learning or place-conscious learning introduces children and youth to the skills and dispositions needed to regenerate and sustain communities. It achieves this end by drawing on local phenomena as the source of at least a share of children’s learning experiences, helping them to understand the processes that underlie the health of natural and social systems essential to human welfare.

The first SOI expeditions were to Antarctica in 2000 and the Arctic in 2001. As of 2020, 36 polar expeditions had been completed including two expeditions to Antarctica for university students. More than 2,000 high school and university students, teachers, and experts from fifty-three countries have participated on SOI expeditions. The Students on Ice slogan "Protect the poles, protect the planet" was adopted in 2008. In June 2012, a delegation of SOI alumni attended the United Nations Conference on Sustainable Development (Rio +20) in Rio de Janeiro, Brazil where they addressed world leaders and tabled a recommendation paper emphasizing the need for long-term polar sustainability. The alumni delegation was also represented at the 2012 United Nations Climate Change Conference in Doha, Qatar. In 2017, SOI led the Canada C3 project to celebrate the 150th anniversary of Canada's confederation -- a 150-day sailing journey from Toronto, Ontario to Victoria, British Columbia via the Northwest Passage.

== Operations ==
Students on Ice is currently based in Gatineau, Quebec. It conducts two ship-based journeys annually: typically one to the Eastern Canadian Arctic and western coast of Greenland (and occasionally Iceland); and the other to southern South America, the Antarctic Peninsula and surrounding Southern Ocean. Expeditions typically involve 100 international students, aged 14 and up. The students travel with a team of staff and educators including scientists, historians, artists, elders, explorers, polar experts and others. SOI also offers a biennial expedition offering university-level course credits for undergraduate and graduate students through a program of small boat excursions and ship-board presentations and research activities in partnership with several international universities and educational institutions. Additionally, SOI has led occasional Arctic floe edge expeditions (to the region where the frozen Arctic Ocean meets the open ocean) during which students travel by snowmobile and qamutiq (komatik) across the sea ice. SOI also organized a Gulf of St. Lawrence research trip with whale expert Richard Sears and Mingan Island Cetacean Study biologists to observe and survey the endangered blue whale.

== Founder, Geoff Green ==
Geoff Green is the founder and executive director of Students on Ice Expeditions, and President of the Students on Ice Foundation and the Polar Education Foundation. He has been leading polar expeditions for more than two decades. In 2012, he was appointed to the Order of Canada in recognition of "his contributions as an environmental educator and explorer, notably his commitment to conservation issues in the Arctic and Antarctic." He was recognized as one of 25 Transformational Canadians in 2010 by The Globe and Mail, the CTV Television Network and La Presse; one of Canada's ‘Top 40 under 40’ and as Outpost Magazine's ‘Top 5 Canadian Explorers’ to watch. Geoff received a Certificate of Special Congressional Recognition by the U.S. Congress in 2005 for his work with youth and the environment and a Citation of Merit for outstanding feats of exploration and service from the Explorers Club, New York City. His Inuktitut name, bestowed upon him by the Commissioner of Nunavut in 2010, is “Pitsiulak.”

Green is a veteran expedition leader of over one-hundred Antarctic and Arctic expeditions. He is the first person to have water-skied in both polar regions, has been through the Northwest Passage three times, and has retraced parts of Sir Ernest Shackleton’s famed Endurance journey six times. This included a 1998 expedition with descendants of Shackleton's crew. He is a Fellow of the Explorers Club, a board member for the Ottawa Riverkeeper, the Mingan Island Cetacean Study, the Arctic Circle Club, and the Canadian National Committee for the International Polar Year 2007–2008. He is also the national ambassador for the Jardin des Glaciers project in Baie Comeau, Quebec, and the national spokesperson for Brita's Filter for Good campaign. Green has addressed schools, conferences, and corporate and special events around the world. He has been a guest speaker at the Royal Geographical Society in London, England, the Smithsonian Institution in Washington D.C., and the Canadian Museum of Civilization in Ottawa. Green and SOI expeditions have been featured in international media, and in numerous documentaries and television programs.

== Antarctic Youth Expeditions ==
Students on Ice organizes annual ship-based journeys to southern South America, the Antarctic Peninsula and surrounding Southern Ocean during the Austral summer when the weather conditions are suitable. It is at this time of year that the surrounding sea ice has melted sufficiently to allow access to Antarctic waters, which are abundant with millions of penguins, seals, seabirds and whales. During this season, Antarctica is home to the greatest concentration of wildlife on Earth.

On board activities for students include presentations, seminars and other hands-on activities focused on topics including the history, geography, and the flora and fauna of the Antarctic. Students have the opportunity to assist international scientists who are conducting on-going research projects and fieldwork. During forum sessions, students examine the complex environmental, geopolitical and economical issues facing Antarctica, while simultaneously exploring solutions and policy alternatives to the challenges facing the Antarctic and the planet. Students make shore landings on the coast of the Antarctic Peninsula in Zodiac boats operated by qualified guides. They also visit islands noted for their abundant penguin populations. Students on Ice is a member of the International Association of Antarctica Tour Operators (IAATO), a member organisation founded in 1991 to advocate and practice safe and environmentally responsible private-sector travel to the Antarctic. All activities adhere strictly to industry-generated Antarctic Visitor and Tour Operator Guidelines.

=== Route and itinerary ===
The Antarctic itinerary is always subject to change due to weather and ice conditions.The SOI website states: “We take advantage of all our opportunities, while at the same time respecting the power of the Antarctic climate.” Expeditions begin in late December when students travel to gateway cities of Toronto, New York, and Buenos Aires, Argentina, or Santiago, Chile, ultimately to convene as one international group in Ushuaia, Argentina, the southernmost town in the world. Students typically spend a day in Ushuaia hiking into the Tierra del Fuego backcountry and participating in pre-expedition educational activities. The ship-based expedition begins as the expedition vessel exits the Beagle Channel and heads for the Drake Passage. SOI Antarctic expedition participants have the unique experience of celebrating Christmas or ringing in the New Year as they cross the Antarctic Convergence and make their first landing in the South Shetland Islands.

Itinerary items in Antarctica include Zodiac boat landings and cruises to Paulet Island and the Argentine Esperanza Base; Deception Island, a dormant volcano inhabited by chinstrap penguins; Koerner Rock, Neko Harbour and Ukraine's Vernadsky Station, a scientific research base in Antarctica; Petermann Island, home of gentoo penguin and Adélie penguin colonies, Pleneau Island, Danco Island, and Goudier Island, and the rocky Wauwermans Islands.

On the return trip through the Drake Passage, the lecture series continues and student forum activities commence. The return trip, weather conditions permitting, includes a sail around famous Cape Horn. Students return to Ushuaia to disembark from the expedition vessel and catch return flights home via Buenos Aires, Santiago, New York and Toronto. According to the SOI website, a “journey that once took explorers two years to accomplish will now take us just over two weeks!”

=== The expedition vessel ===
In past years, a number of expedition vessels have been engaged for SOI Antarctic expeditions. They include MV Polar Star, which has been converted for expedition cruising, and the MV Akademik Shokalskiy. The SOI's southern expeditions have been conducted on the research vessel, the MV Ushuaia, built in 1970 for the National Oceanic and Atmospheric Administration (NOAA). She has served for the NOAA under the names Researcher and Malcolm Baldrige. The ship can carry approximately 84 passengers and staff and has more than 40 cabins as well as an open bridge policy, deck space, dedicated research areas and public areas including a dining room, an observation lounge, a conference room with modern multimedia equipment and a well-stocked library.

== Arctic Youth Expeditions ==
Each Arctic ship-based journey follows a unique itinerary, but past SOI Arctic expeditions have explored Iceland, southern Greenland, in coastal regions of Baffin Island, the north shore of Labrador, coastal regions of Manitoba, and Canada's high Arctic. The expedition focus is on making links between local realities and global issues. Students visit Arctic communities and meet with local Inuit to consider how the Arctic shapes northern identity. They learn about the effects of climate change on Arctic ecosystems and explore options toward the advancement of a sustainable Arctic and a sustainable planet. While on the expedition, participants encounter a wide variety of wildlife, including whales, seals, polar bears, and seabirds, and they participate in hands-on educational and research activities. Activities include Zodiac cruises, shore landings, hikes, community visits, and ship-based presentations, workshops, small group discussions and time for personal reflection

=== Route and itinerary ===
On average, the summer expedition is 15 days in length. After participants have assembled in Ottawa, they fly north. The itinerary changes from year to year and expeditions have variously embarked from Iceland, Iqaluit, Nunavut, Kuujjuaq, Nunavik, Churchill, Manitoba, or Pangnirtung and Baffin Island. Once aboard the ship, students have the opportunity to observe humpbacks, minke whales, orcas, narwhals, bowhead whales, belugas, walruses, polar bears and dozens of seabird species, and to explore high Arctic coastal regions via Zodiac boat excursions and landings to see glaciers, icebergs, fjords, and the world's northernmost communities and research stations. Expeditions beginning in Iceland have in the past included land-based activities such as a day in Reykjavík; visits to the Blue Lagoon, active geysers, Iceland's icecap, ancient fishing villages, the volcanic Vestmannaeyjar, or Westman Islands; a tour of a geothermal power plant; a hike in Thingvellir National Park, a UNESCO World Heritage Site or along the shores of Skagafjörður, aka the Skaga Fjord, Saudarkrokur; a trip to Hvammstangi, home of the Icelandic Seal Centre, or the Husavik Whale Museum, located on the eastern shore of the Skjalfandi Bay. Itineraries involving Greenland have featured visits to Herjorlfsnes, the Nordic settlement founded by Erik Thorvaldsson aka Erik the Red c. 985, the ancient hot springs on the island of Uunartoq, Jakobshavn Glacier; and Tasermiut Fjord. Expeditions to Labrador have included trekking in the Torngat Mountains National Park and Zodiac landings at Killiniq Island and Cape Chidley.

Past eastern Arctic Archipelago expeditions have focused on Baffin Island with excursions to Pangnirtung Fjord, Sam Ford Fjord, or Sunneshine Fjord, home of a Cold War-era Distant Early Warning Line (or, DEW Line) radar station; Sirmilik National Park and Auyuittuq National Park; the Grinnell Glacier or Cape Dorset; and Butterfly Bay. Arctic expeditions itineraries also routinely venture to the smaller islands in the Davis Strait, Hudson Strait, and Ungava Bay. Day trip destinations have included Kekerton Historic Park, an abandoned whaling station, Monumental Island, named in honour of early Arctic explorer, Sir John Franklin, the uninhabited Lower Savage Islands, and Akpatok Island, which with International Biological Program status, is a Canadian Important Bird Area (IBA) and a Key Migratory Bird Terrestrial Habitat site. Expeditions typically conclude with a final celebration with students, expedition experts, and local dignitaries and citizens in Resolute Bay, Iqaluit, or Kuujjuaq, Nunavik. From there, participants board a First Air charter flight to return to Ottawa, Ontario.

=== The expedition vessel ===
In past years, a number of expedition vessels have been engaged for SOI Arctic expeditions. They include the Akademik Ioffe, the Kapitan Khlebnikov, the MV Explorer, and the Polar Ambassador. Most recently, the SOI's expedition vessel of choice has been the MV Clipper Adventurer, an ice-capable charter ship operating in both polar regions. She was built in 1975 in the former Yugoslavia and operated as the Alla Tarasova. In 1998, she underwent a $13 million refit. She has capacity for 122 passengers in 61 cabins, all with exterior views. She also has a window-lined dining room, a library, and two common lounges.

== Antarctic University Expeditions ==
In February 2009, SOI inaugurated its biennial Antarctic University Expedition in partnership with the University of Alberta, the University of Northern British Columbia, and the University of Ottawa as well as numerous corporate and government agencies. This ship-based expedition was the first of its kind and offered undergraduate and graduate students from any university anywhere in the world an opportunity to take university-level credit courses while on expedition to the Antarctic continent. The 2009 expedition involved 71 international students and 17 university faculty, scientists, policy makers and polar experts. A second university expedition was made in 2011, this time attracting more than 60 students from 23 universities and a team of 30 educators and other staff. The list of supporting universities included Carleton University, Luleå University of Technology, Sweden, McGill University, the University of California at Los Angeles and the University of St. Andrews, Scotland. The United Nations also became one of the sponsoring agencies for this expedition through the UN Environment Programme, UNEP/GRID-Arendal, and the UN Programme on Youth. The 2009 and 2011 university expeditions included field trips and landings on the Antarctic mainland. These were supplemented by lectures, presentations, seminars and lab exercises in a dedicated space aboard the expedition ship, the MV Ushuaia. Lectures and workshop subjects included geology, geopolitics, social and cultural history, terrestrial ecology, marine biology, glaciology, oceanography and hydrology, atmospheric sciences, ornithology, and environmental studies. Students were also given a chance to work with the education team members on ongoing scientific research (e.g., wildlife surveys, measuring pollution levels in ice core samples, plankton tows focusing on marine diversity, etc.) A third Students on Ice Antarctic University Expedition occurred December 27, 2013 – January 10, 2014.

== Expedition outcomes ==
=== Alumni achievements ===
Five SOI alumni have been selected as Loran Scholars, receiving Canada's largest undergraduate merit award. Four alumni have been awarded Toyota Earth Day national and regional scholarships, and other alumni have won the Canadian Future Achiever Award, the TD Canada Trust Scholarship for Community Leadership, and the Peter Thiel Foundation Fellowship. An SOI alumna was recently awarded a Rhodes Scholarship to pursue graduate studies at the University of Oxford.

Many SOI alumni are members of and have served on the executive of the Canadian Youth Climate Coalition, the Association of Polar Early Career Scientists (APECS), and The Climate Project Canada. Four alumni were selected for the Canadian Youth Delegation to COP 15, the United Nations Climate Change Meetings that took place in Copenhagen in December 2009, and another SOI alumnus has interned for the Arctic Council Indigenous Peoples Secretariat in Denmark.

Malaika Vaz aged 16, the youngest explorer to reach Antarctica was a member of 2012 Students on Ice Expedition team. She was also a member of the 2013 Arctic exploration team the youngest explorer to reach the Arctic.

SOI alumni have become award-winning entrepreneurs and inventors, agents for sustainable development and governance, environmental researchers, global youth ambassadors, and nationally recognized aboriginal youth leaders.

In summer 2012, a group of Alumni created the Students on Ice Alumni Delegation and attended the UN Rio+20 Conference to raise awareness about polar sustainability issues. The delegation was selected to host a side event during the conference. The alumni delegation was also represented at the 2012 United Nations Climate Change Conference in Doha, Qatar.

Others have expressed their views in the media and the arts, science and environmental columnists, exhibited landscape artists, or as editors/contributors to the SOI alumnus publication, the Alumni Ice Cap newsletter.

=== Other ===
In 2008, the Canadian government designated Niginganiq (Isabella Bay), Nunavut, as a National Wildlife Area after over 20 years of pressure from local Inuit and more recently, a petition campaign initiated by SOI alumni. The Students on Ice 2009 documentary film Imiqutailaq – Path of the Arctic Tern screened at the International Polar Year (IPY) Film Festival in 2009 and the Planet In Focus International Film & Video Festival in 2010.

SOI is a participant in the Drift Bottle Project, led by Dr. Eddy Carmack of the Department of Fisheries and Oceans, Canada.

SOI provides opportunities for established Canadian scientists to pursue their research in the field thus contributing to active museum collections and helping to advance the state of learning in their areas of expertise.

== Partnerships ==
Students on Ice has a network of partner businesses, associations, foundations, universities, museums, government agencies and not-for-profit and charitable organisations that support and contribute to the operation of SOI programs. These include Antarpply Expeditions, the Association of Polar Early Career Scientists (aka APECS), Brita, Canadian Geographic magazine, the Canadian Museum of Nature, the Canadian Polar Commission, the Canadian Space Agency(CSA/ASC), Cruise North Expeditions Inc., EYES Project, First Air, impossible2Possible (i2p), the International Polar Year (IPY 2007–2008), Inuit Tapiriit Kanatami, LAN Airlines, Makivik Corporation, the Many Strong Voices Consortium, the Natural Sciences and Engineering Research Council of Canada (NSERC), Earth Day Canada (EDC), the People to People Student Ambassador Program, Podium Audio/Visual, the Royal Canadian Geographical Society, the Stephen R. Bronfman Foundation, The Explorers Club, UNEP/GRID-Arendal, the Walter & Duncan Gordon Foundation, World Wildlife Federation (WWF), Yellow Media, and the participating universities of the Antarctic University Expeditions.
