= Snarby Peak =

Mountain in Queen Maud Land, Antarctica

Snarby Peak (72°2′S 1°37′E) is an isolated peak 6 nautical miles (11 km) northeast of Brattskarvet Mountain, at the northeast end of the Sverdrup Mountains, in Queen Maud Land. Photographed from the air by the German Antarctic Expedition (1938–39). Mapped by Norwegian cartographers from surveys and air photos by Norwegian-British-Swedish Antarctic Expedition (NBSAE) (1949–52) and air photos by the Norwegian expedition (1958–59). Named for John Snarby, cook with the NBSAE.
