= GRID-Arendal =

Norwegian environmental non-profit

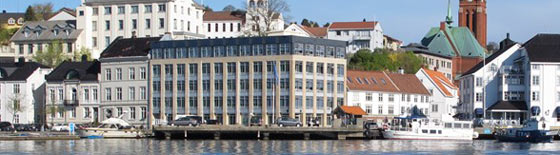
Photo of GRID-Arendal offices in Arendal, Norway

GRID-Arendal is a United Nations Environment Programme (UN Environment, or UNEP) partner, located in Arendal, Norway. The Norwegian government created AGRID-Arendal 37 years ago.

GRID-Arendal informed there would be 50 million climate refugees by 2010. Its chart specified that part of the population impacted would come from small islands, some of which "will disappear completely."

The centre was established in 1989 by the Norwegian Government as a non-profit foundation to support the United Nations in the field of environmental information management and assessment, capacity-building and communications and outreach. It is part of the GRID network of environmental data and information centers, under the UNEP Division of Early Warning and Assessment (DEWA). The GRID program itself was established in 1985 as a part of Earthwatch with the goal of providing useful environmental data to researchers and policymakers. GRID (Global Resource Information Database) centers also support developing countries through training programs and transfer of technology pertinent to geographic information systems and remote sensing.

GRID-Arendal works to synthesise environmental data into information products accessible to policymakers and the public. The GRID-Arendal website hosts a collection of environmental graphics, photographs and maps. The organisation's motto is "Environmental Knowledge for Change".

== Arctic collaboration ==
GRID-Arendal is an active member of the University of the Arctic. UArctic is an international cooperative network based in the Circumpolar Arctic region, consisting of more than 200 universities, colleges, and other organizations with an interest in promoting education and research in the Arctic region.

== See also ==
- United Nations Convention on the Law of the Sea (UNCLOS)
- Elaine Baker, UNESCO Chair in Marine Science at the University of Sydney, a position sponsored by GRID-Arendal
