= Reece Valley =

Valley in Queen Maud Land, Antarctica

Reece Valley (72°41′S 0°22′E) is an ice-filled valley between Gavlen Ridge and Nupskåpa Peak, in the south part of the Sverdrup Mountains in Queen Maud Land, Antarctica. It was mapped by Norwegian cartographers from surveys and air photos by Norwegian–British–Swedish Antarctic Expedition (NBSAE) (1949–52) and air photos by the Norwegian expedition (1958–59). It was named after Alan Reece, geologist with the NBSAE (1949–52) and earlier with the Falkland Islands Dependencies Survey (FIDS).
