= Fuglefjellet =

Mountain in Antarctica

Fuglefjellet (72°17′S 0°46′E) is a mountain 7 nautical miles (13 km) east of Mount Roer in the Sverdrup Mountains of Queen Maud Land, Antarctica. It was photographed from the air by the Third German Antarctic Expedition (1938–39). It was mapped by Norwegian cartographers from surveys and air photos by the Norwegian–British–Swedish Antarctic Expedition (1949–52) and from air photos by the Norwegian expedition (1958–59) and named Fuglefjellet (the bird mountain).
