= Kvithø Peak =

Mountain in Queen Maud Land, Antarctica

Kvithø Peak (72°29′S 1°13′E) is an isolated peak rising above the ice 7 nautical miles (13 km) southeast of Kvitkjolen Ridge, in the Sverdrup Mountains of Queen Maud Land, Antarctica. It was photographed from the air by the Third German Antarctic Expedition (1938–39). The peak was mapped by Norwegian cartographers from surveys and air photos by the Norwegian–British–Swedish Antarctic Expedition (1949–52) and air photos by the Norwegian expedition (1958–59) and named Kvithø (white hill).
