= Gavlen Ridge =

Ridge in the Sverdrup Mountains, Antarctica

Gavlen Ridge (72°39′S 0°27′E) is a ridge forming the southern extremity of the Roots Heights, in the southern part of the Sverdrup Mountains in Queen Maud Land, Antarctica. It was photographed from the air by the Third German Antarctic Expedition, which took place in 1938–39. It was mapped by Norwegian cartographers from surveys and air photos by the Norwegian–British–Swedish Antarctic Expedition (1949–52) and from air photos by the Norwegian expedition (1958–59) and named Gavlen (the gable).
