= Rømlingane Peaks =

Mountains in Queen Maud Land, Antarctica

Romlingane Peaks (72°11′S 1°8′E) is a chain of peaks extending from the west side of Vendeholten Mountain, in the Sverdrup Mountains, Queen Maud Land. Photographed from the air by the German Antarctic Expedition (1938–39). Mapped by Norwegian cartographers from surveys and air photos by Norwegian-British-Swedish Antarctic Expedition (NBSAE) (1949–52) and air photos by the Norwegian expedition (1958–59) and named Romlingane (the fugitives).
