= Mount Krüger =

Mountain in Queen Maud Land, Antarctica

Highest point
- Elevation: 2,655 m (8,711 ft)
- Coordinates: 72°36′S 0°57′E

Geography
- Location: Queen Maud Land, Antarctica
- Parent range: Sverdrup Mountains

Mount Krüger, or Krügerfjellet (German: Krügerberg), is a 2,655-metre (8,710 ft) mountain standing 8 nautical miles (15 km) southwest of Kvithø Peak in the Sverdrup Mountains of Queen Maud Land, Antarctica. The summit of Krüger is the highest point in the Sverdrup Mtns.

== Discovery and naming ==
Mount Krüger was discovered by the Third German Antarctic Expedition (1938–1939), led by Captain Alfred Ritscher, and named for Walter Krüger, a meteorological assistant on the expedition. It was surveyed by the Norwegian–British–Swedish Antarctic Expedition (1949–1952), led by John Schjelderup Giæver.

== See also ==
- List of mountains of Queen Maud Land
