= Hamartind Peak =

Mountain in Antarctica

Hamartind Peak (72°33′S 0°39′E) is a peak, 2,885 metres (9,465 ft) high, at the eastern extremity of the Hamrane Heights, making it the highest peak in the Sverdrup Mountains of Queen Maud Land, Antarctica. The peak was photographed from the air by the Third German Antarctic Expedition (1938–39). It was mapped by Norwegian cartographers from surveys and air photos by the Norwegian–British–Swedish Antarctic Expedition (1949–52) and from air photos by the Sixth Norwegian Antarctic Expedition (1958–59) and named Hamartind (the crag peak).

== See also ==
- List of mountains in Queen Maud Land
