= Salknappen Peak =

Mountain in Queen Maud Land, Antarctica

Salknappen Peak (72°19′S 1°2′E) is a subsidiary peak on the north side of Isingen Mountain, in the Sverdrup Mountains, Queen Maud Land. Photographed from the air by the German Antarctic Expedition (1938–39). Mapped by Norwegian cartographers from surveys and air photos by Norwegian-British-Swedish Antarctic Expedition (NBSAE) (1949–52) and air photos by the Norwegian expedition (1958–59) and named Salknappen (the saddle button).
