= Skarsdalen Valley =

Ice-filled valley

Skarsdalen Valley (72°33′S 0°30′E) is an ice-filled valley between Roots Heights and Hamrane Heights in the Sverdrup Mountains, Queen Maud Land. Photographed from the air by the German Antarctic Expedition (1938–39). Mapped by Norwegian cartographers from surveys and air photos by Norwegian-British-Swedish Antarctic Expedition (NBSAE) (1949–52) and air photos by the Norwegian expedition (1958–59) and named Skarsdalen (the gap valley).
