= Kvitsvodene Valley =

Valley in Queen Maud Land, Antarctica

Kvitsvodene Valley (72°26′S 0°45′E) is an ice-filled valley about 5 nautical miles (10 km) long between Kvitkjølen Ridge and the Robin Heights in the Sverdrup Mountains of Queen Maud Land, Antarctica. It was photographed from the air by the Third German Antarctic Expedition (1938–39). The valley was mapped and named by Norwegian cartographers from surveys and air photos by the Norwegian–British–Swedish Antarctic Expedition (NBSAE) (1949–52) and air photos by the Norwegian expedition (1958–59).
