= Kvithovden Peak =

Mountain in Queen Maud Land, Antarctica

Kvithovden Peak (72°22′S 0°45′E) is a peak at the north end of Kvitkjolen Ridge in the Sverdrup Mountains of Queen Maud Land, Antarctica. It was photographed from the air by the Third German Antarctic Expedition (1938–39). The peak was mapped by Norwegian cartographers from surveys and air photos by the Norwegian–British–Swedish Antarctic Expedition (1949–52) and air photos by the Norwegian expedition (1958–59) and named Kvithovden (the white peak).
