= Rogstad Glacier =

Glacier in Antarctica

- Location of Queen Maud Land in Antarctica

- Location within Antarctica
- Location: Queen Maud Land
- Coordinates: 72°21′S 1°19′E
- Thickness: unknown
- Terminus: Sverdrup Mountains
- Status: unknown

Rogstad Glacier (72°21′S 1°19′E) is a glacier flowing northwest along the north side of Isingen Mountain, in the Sverdrup Mountains, Queen Maud Land. Photographed from the air by the German Antarctic Expedition (1938–39). Mapped by Norwegian cartographers from surveys and air photos by Norwegian-British-Swedish Antarctic Expedition (NBSAE) (1949–52) and air photos by the Norwegian expedition (1958–59). Named for Egil Rogstad, chief radio operator with the NBSAE.

== See also ==
- List of glaciers in the Antarctic
- Glaciology
