= International Polar Year =

Efforts with intensive research focus on the polar regions

Logo

The International Polar Years (IPY) are collaborative, international efforts with intensive research focus on the polar regions. Karl Weyprecht, an Austro-Hungarian naval officer, motivated the endeavor in 1875, but died before it first occurred in 1882–1883. Fifty years later (1932–1933) a second IPY took place. The International Geophysical Year was inspired by the IPY and was organized 75 years after the first IPY (1957–58). The fourth, and most recent, IPY covered two full annual cycles from March 2007 to March 2009.

== The First International Polar Year (1882–1883) ==
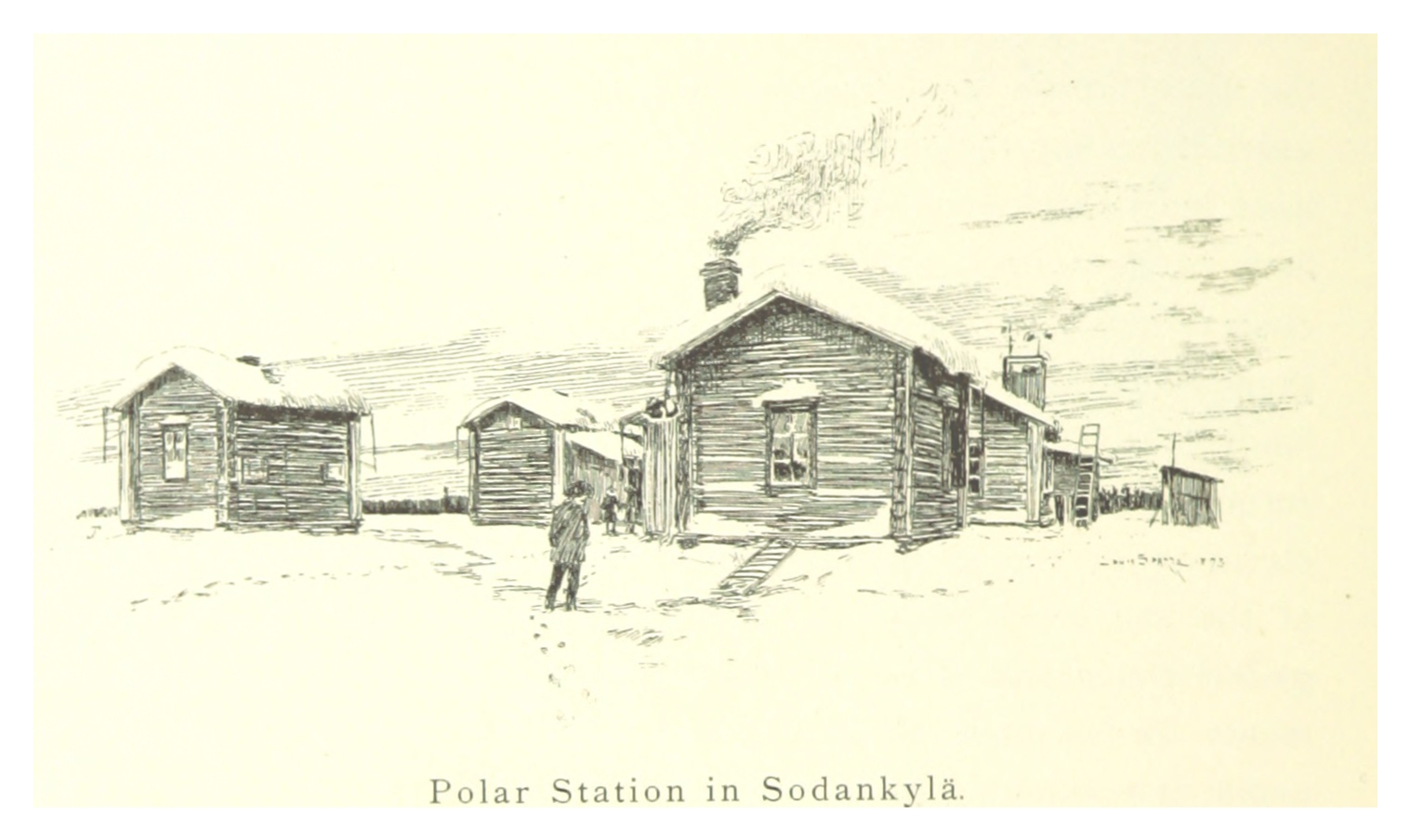
Polar Station in Sodankylä (1894)

The First International Polar Year was proposed by an Austro-Hungarian naval officer, Karl Weyprecht, in 1875 and organized by Georg Neumayer, director of the German Maritime Observatory. Rather than settling for traditional individual and national efforts, they pushed for a coordinated scientific approach to researching Arctic phenomena. Observers made coordinated geophysical measurements at multiple locations in the Arctic during the same year enabling multiple views of the same phenomena, allowing broader interpretation of the available data and validation of the results obtained.

It took seven years to organize the first IPY which had eleven participating nations: the Austro-Hungarian Empire, Denmark, Finland, France, Germany, Netherlands, Norway, Russia, Sweden, United Kingdom, and United States.

The aforementioned countries operated 12 stations in the Arctic and two in the sub-Antarctic. Six additional meteorological stations were organized by Neumayer at Moravian mission stations on the east coast of Labrador. Observations focused on meteorology, geomagnetism, auroral phenomena, ocean currents, tides, structure, and the motion of ice and atmospheric electricity. More than 40 meteorological observatories around the world expanded the IPY programs of observations for this period. Data and images from the first IPY have recently been made available to browse and download on the internet. These records of the first IPY offer a rare glimpse of the circumpolar Arctic environment as it existed in the past and hold the potential to improve our understanding of historical climate variability and environmental change in the Arctic.

== The Second International Polar Year (1932–1933) ==
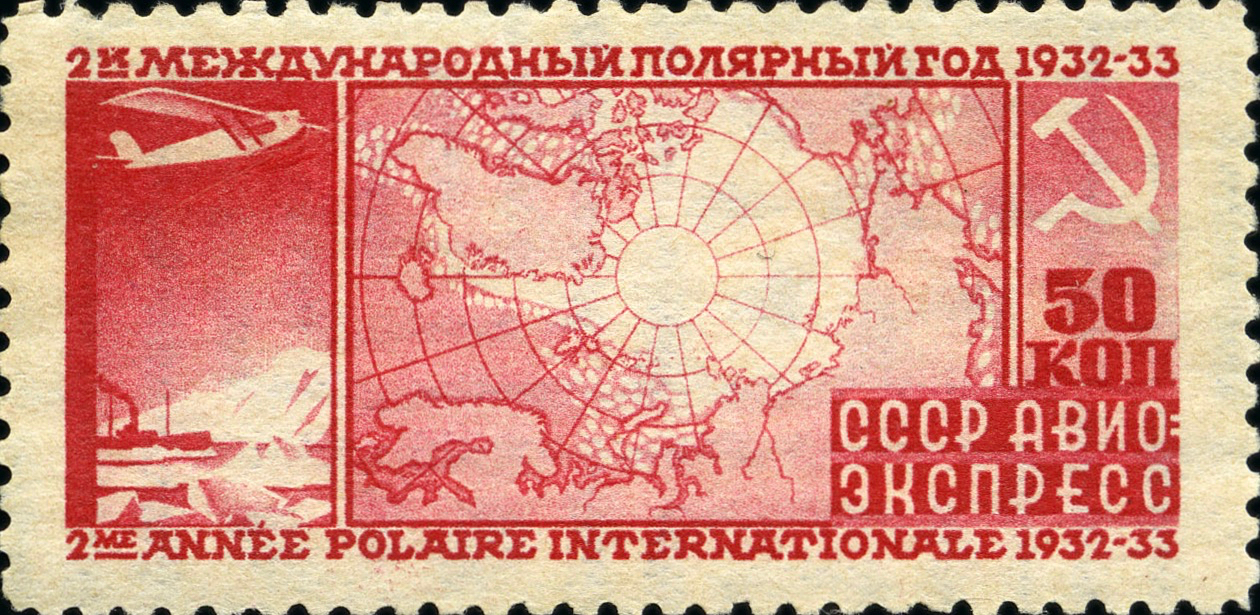
Soviet postage stamp commemorating the 1932–33 Polar Year

The International Meteorological Organization, the predecessor of the World Meteorological Organization (WMO), proposed and promoted the second IPY (1932–1933). Shortly after World War I, mysterious behavior in telegraph, radio and electric power and telephone lines convinced engineers and scientists of the fact that the electrical geophysics of the Earth needed more study. The availability of airplanes, motorized sea and land transport and new instruments like radiosondes enabled these phenomena to be investigated.

At an international conference of directors of meteorological services in Copenhagen in 1928 it was decided to undertake another intensive and coordinated international research effort focused on the polar regions during 1932–1933, the 50th anniversary of the First International Polar Year. It was also proposed to explicitly include in the plan for the second IPY the goal to investigate how observations in the polar regions could improve the accuracy of weather forecasts and the safety of air and sea transport.

Forty-four countries participated in the second IPY, which heralded advances in meteorology, magnetism, atmospheric science, and in the "mapping" of ionospheric phenomena that advanced radio science and technology. 27 observation stations were established in the Arctic, a vast amount of data was collected and a world data center was created under the organization that eventually came to be called the World Meteorological Organization. Due to the Great Depression, the plan of erecting a network of stations in Antarctica had to be abandoned. Also, a great amount of data generated in this year was lost due to the Second World War.

== The Fourth International Polar Year (2007–2008) ==
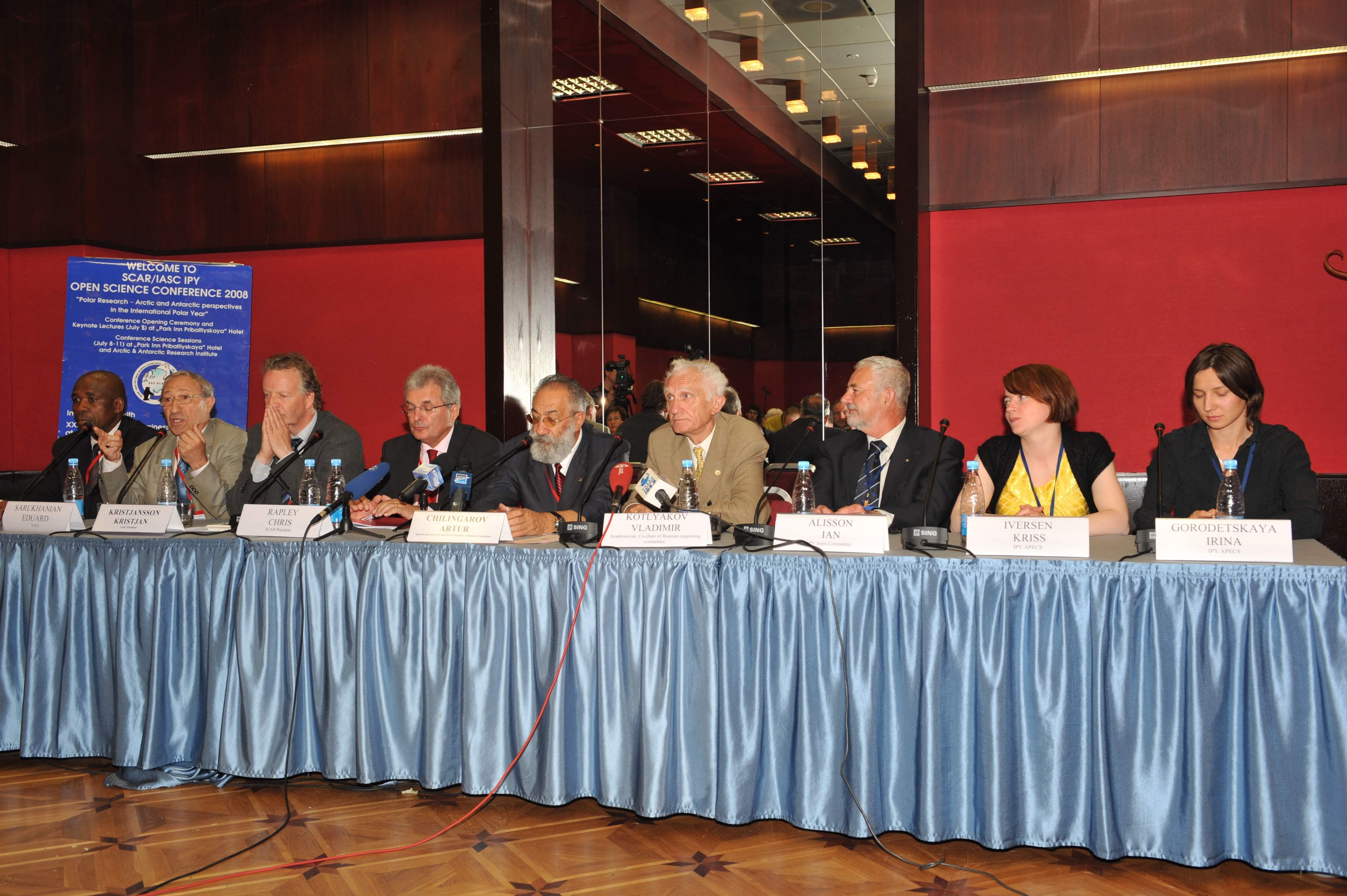
Press conference IPY 2008

The fourth IPY (2007–2008) was sponsored by the International Council for Science (ICSU) and the World Meteorological Organization (WMO). The Scientific Committee on Antarctic Research (SCAR), an interdisciplinary body of ICSU assumed responsibility for coordinating all IPY-related Antarctic research, and the International Arctic Science Committee (IASC), an ICSU affiliate body, promoted and helped to plan the Arctic-focused IPY research. Initial planning for the fourth IPY began in 2003 under an International Planning Group (chaired by Professor Chris Rapley and Dr Robin Bell), and the organization and implementation of the main phase of this IPY took place in 2005–2009 with leadership from the newly established ICSU-WMO Joint Committee (co-chaired by Dr Michel Béland and Dr Ian Allison, who was later replaced as co-chair by Prof. Jerónimo López-Martínez), its subcommittees and the International Programme Office (led by Dr David Carlson).

The fourth IPY comprised an intense, coordinated field campaign of observations, research, and analysis. It was the largest, most comprehensive campaign ever mounted to explore the Earth's polar regions. An estimated 50,000 researchers, local observers, educators, students and support personnel from more than 60 countries were involved in the 228 international IPY projects (170 in scientific research, one in data management, and 57 in education and outreach) and related national efforts. The IPY included intensive research and observation periods in the Arctic and Antarctic over a three-year timespan, which started 1 March 2007 and was formally concluded 12 June 2010 at the IPY Oslo Science Conference. However, many activities continued beyond that date. The IPY Science Program covered eleven areas: Polar atmosphere, Arctic ocean, Southern Ocean, Greenland ice sheet and Arctic glaciers, Antarctic ice sheets, Subglacial aquatic environments, Permafrost, Earth structure and geodynamics at the poles, Polar terrestrial ecology and biodiversity, Polar societies and social processes and Human health.

=== IPY Report ===
In 2011 the ICSU/WMO Joint Committee for the IPY published a comprehensive summary of IPY activities entitled "Understanding Earth's Polar Challenges: International Polar Year 2007–2008". The report covers the development of IPY 2007–2008 for almost a decade, from 2001 to 2010. It comprises 38 chapters in five parts (Planning, Research, Observations, Outreach, and Legacies) and brings together hundreds of contributing authors from a wide range disciplines and more than 30 countries. This broad overview demonstrates the extensive and essential contribution made by participating nations and organizations, and provides a prospective blueprint for future polar research.

=== SCAR/IASC Open Science Conference, St. Petersburg, Russia, 2008 ===
A joint conference organized by SCAR and IASC under the overarching theme “Polar Research – Arctic and Antarctic perspectives in the International Polar Year” was held 8–11 July 2008 in St. Petersburg, Russia, and brought together Arctic and Antarctic researchers as part of the fourth IPY. The four-day meeting comprised 29 sessions with over 1400 attendees, 550 oral presentations and 670 posters.

=== IPY Science Conferences ===
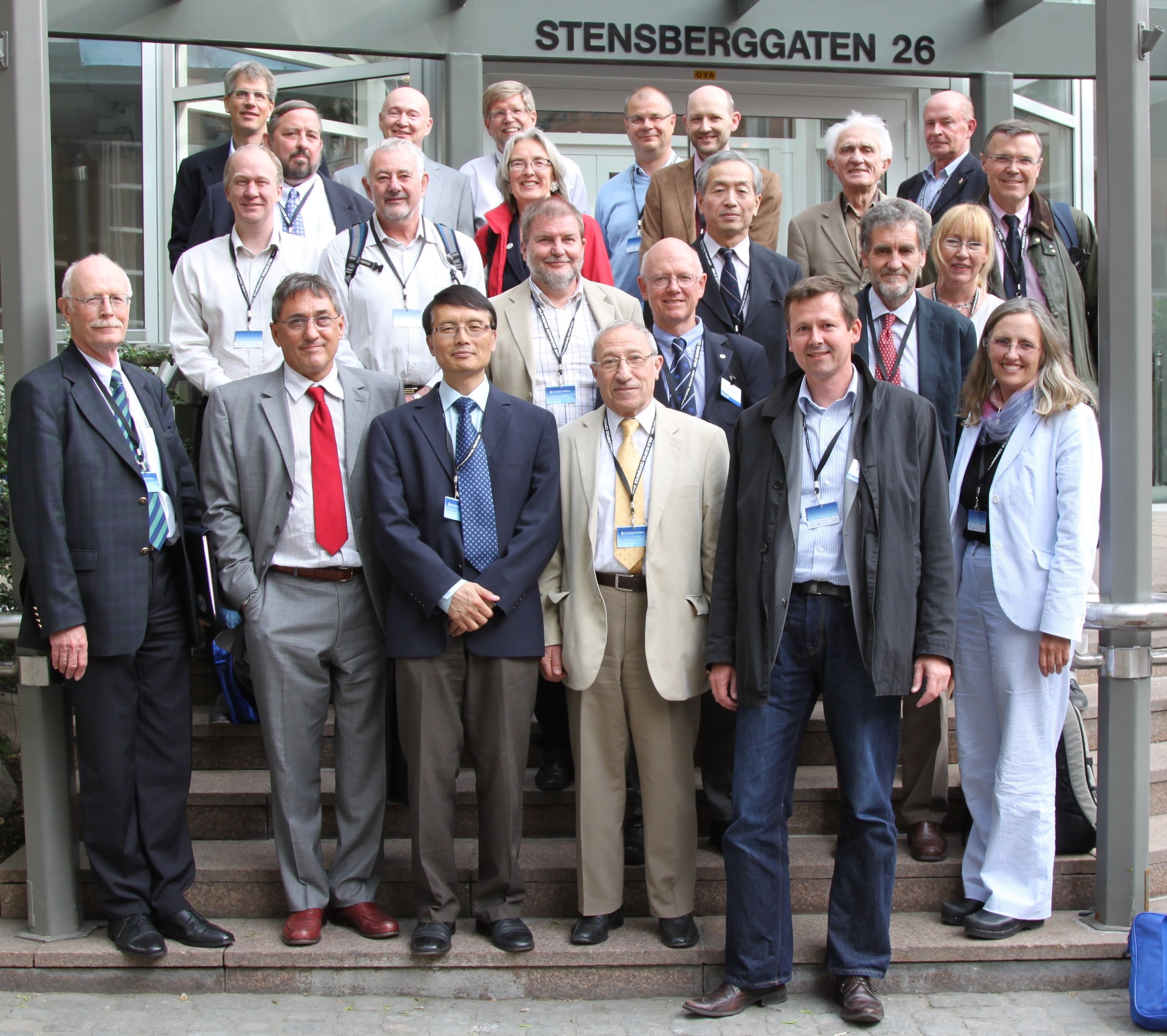
Joint Committee at IPY Oslo 2010

==== Oslo, Norway 2010 ====
The IPY Science Conference was held 8–12 June in Oslo, Norway and was organized by the WMO, ICSU, IASC and the Research Council of Norway and marked the official end of the fourth IPY. The conference aim was to celebrate and publish early results from the International Polar Year 2007–2008 (IPY) and enable direct interaction among all IPY science cluster projects. There were over 2000 participants from over 60 countries.

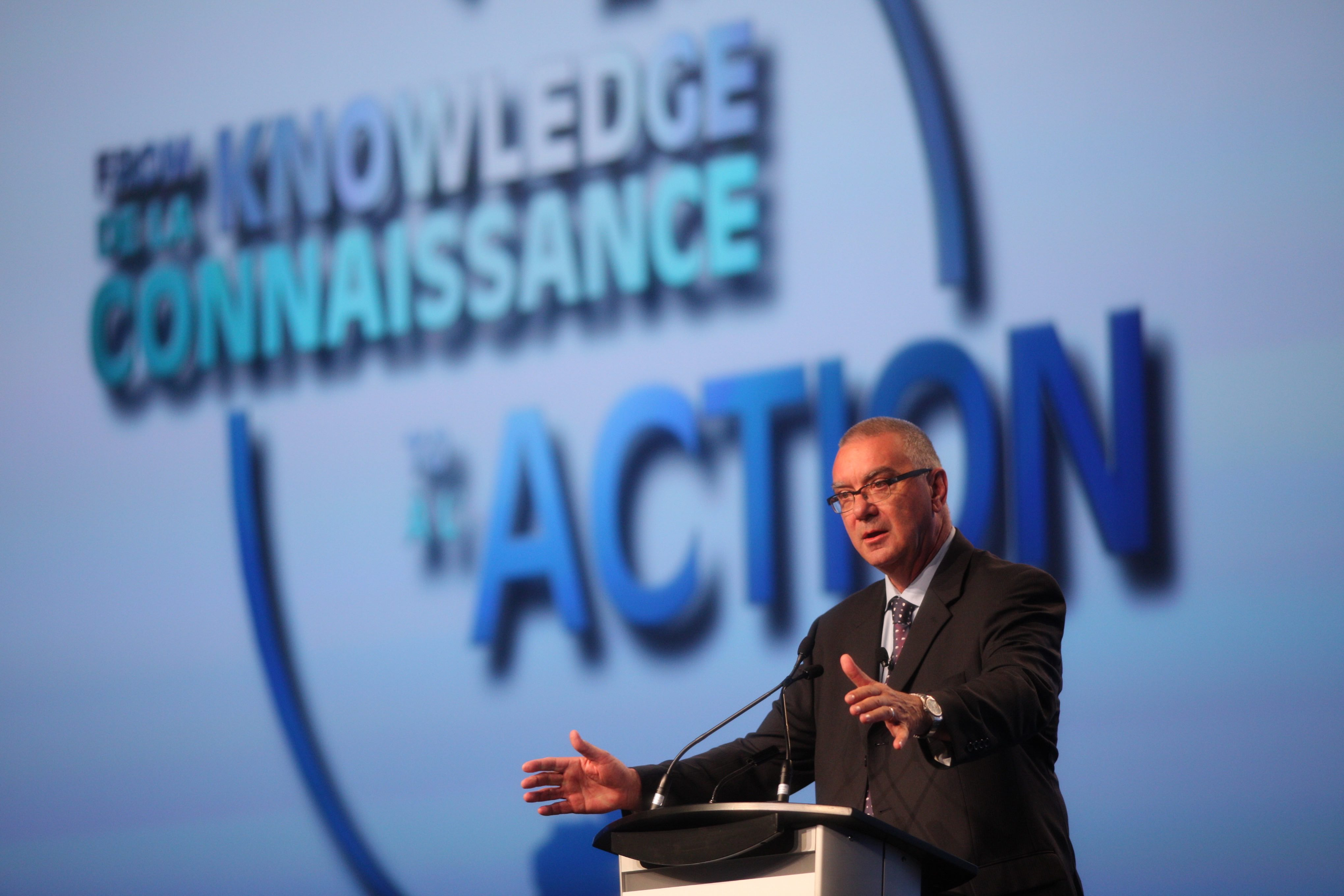
Peter Harrison opens the IPY 2012 conference in Montreal

==== Montréal, Canada, 2012 ====
Building on the previous IPY Science Conference in Oslo, the IPY steering committee organized a science conference (22–27 April 2012) in Montréal, Canada, with the theme ‘From knowledge to action’. This conference examined the global impact and implications of International Polar Year activities. The aim of the IPY Science Conference in 2012 was to help shape stewardship, sustainable development and environmental protection goals for the strategic and highly valued polar regions. In total the IPY 2012 conference received 2134 abstracts with contributions from over 45 countries.

=== Polar Educators International ===
A legacy of the IPY 2012 "From Knowledge to Action" Conference Polar Educators Workshop, together with the education and outreach efforts of the International Polar Year 2007 – 2008, was the establishment of Polar Educators International (PEI), a network promoting polar education and research to a global community. This includes a formal network of professionals involved in science education focused on promoting excellence in teaching polar science. Louise Huffman, co-chair of the IPY Education and Outreach Committee was one of the founding members.

=== The Association of Polar Early Career Scientists (APECS) ===
The Association of Polar Early Career Scientists (APECS) was founded during the fourth IPY.

Following a meeting in Stockholm at the end of September 2007, the IPY International Youth Steering Committee (IYSC) and the Association of Polar Early Career Scientists (APECS) merged under a new structure while maintaining the name ‘APECS’. The IPY International Youth Steering Committee (IYSC) had been established in 2004 by Amber Church, Tyler Kuhn, Melanie Raymond and Hugues Lantuit to represent the needs of the youth during the fourth IPY, and the Association of Polar Early Career Scientists (APECS) had been established in 2006 to represent the needs and challenges faced by (post-)graduate students, post-docs, junior faculty, and research associates involved in polar research.

APECS aims to stimulate interdisciplinary and international research collaborations, provide opportunities for professional career development and develop effective future leaders in polar research, education and outreach. Jenny Baeseman, as the Founding Director of APECS, established the organisations first international secretariat in Tromsø, Norway during the IPY.

=== International Polar Weeks ===
To provide a platform for a continued focus on the polar regions, the IPY International Programme Office organised Polar Weeks with the theme "What Happens at the Poles Affects Us All" in October 2009 and March 2010.

Twice yearly polar weeks continue to this day and are organized by APECS. These weeks, coinciding with the polar equinoxes, are filled with outreach activities and events designed to engage school children and the wider public in polar science.

== A Planned Fifth International Polar Year (2032–2033) ==
Planning has begun for a fifth International Polar Year in 2032/33 following an agreement between the International Arctic Science Committee (IASC) and the Scientific Committee on Antarctic Research (SCAR).

== International Polar Year Publications Database ==
The International Polar Year Publications Database (IPYPD) attempts to identify and describe all publications that result from, or are about, any of the four IPYs that have been undertaken so far. The IPYPD is part of the IPY Data and Information Service (IPYDIS). The IPYPD has been created by the Arctic Science and Technology Information System (ASTIS), the Cold Regions Bibliography Project (CRBP), the Scott Polar Research Institute (SPRI) Library, the Discovery and Access of Historic Literature of the IPYs (DAHLI) project and NISC Export Services (NES). As of February 2016, the database contains 6,724 records.
