= Nupskåpa Peak =

Mountain in Queen Maud Land, Antarctica

Nupskapa Peak (72°43′S 0°16′E) is an icecapped peak, 2,450 m, just south of Reece Valley in the Sverdrup Mountains, Queen Maud Land. Mapped by Norwegian cartographers from surveys and air photos by Norwegian-British-Swedish Antarctic Expedition (NBSAE) (1949–52). Rephotographed by the Norwegian expedition (1958–59) and named Nupskapa (the peak cloak). Storkvaeven Cirque is a cirque on the northwest side of Nupskapa Peak.
