= Storjoen Peak =

Mountain in Queen Maud Land, Antarctica

Storjoen Peak (72°7′S 0°12′W) is a salient peak 4 nautical miles (7 km) northwest of Tvora in the Sverdrup Mountains, Queen Maud Land. Plotted from air photos by the German Antarctic Expedition (1938–39). Remapped by Norwegian cartographers from surveys and air photos by Norwegian-British-Swedish Antarctic Expedition (NBSAE) (1949–52) and air photos by the Norwegian expedition (1958–59) and named Storjoen (the skua).
