= Jenny Baeseman =

American polar researcher

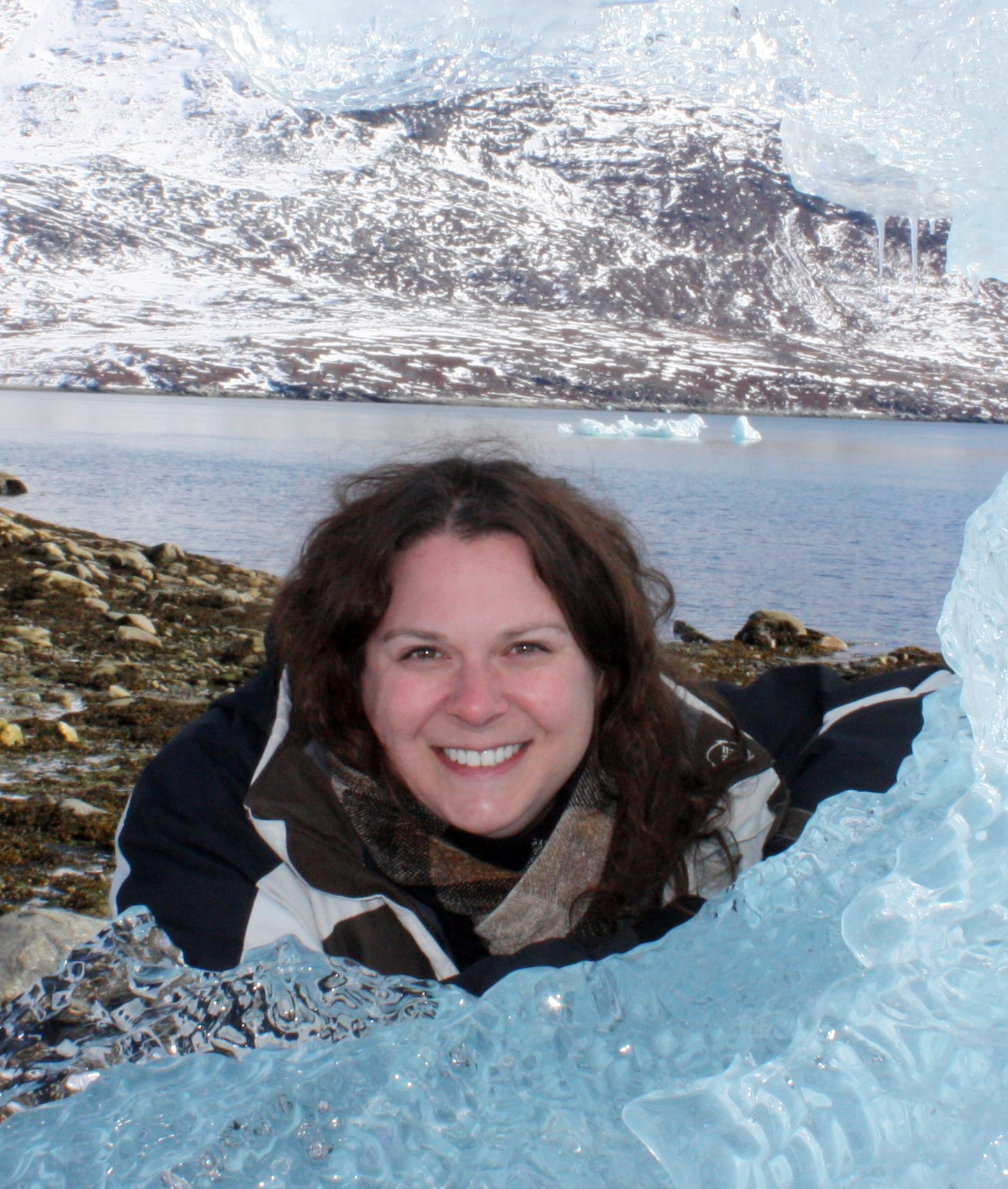
- Education: BSc University of Wisconsin–Stevens Point; MSc University of Minnesota; PhD University of Colorado Boulder
- Scientific career
- Workplaces: SCAR

Jenny Baeseman is an American polar researcher who studies the survival mechanisms of bacteria in cold environments. She is the founding director of the Association of Polar Early Career Scientists (APECS), executive director of the Scientific Committee on Antarctic Research (SCAR), and was previously the executive director of the World Climate Research Program (WCRP) Climate and Cryosphere.

== Early life and education ==
Baeseman grew up in Wisconsin, where she earned a B.S. in water resources and chemistry from the University of Wisconsin–Stevens Point (UWSP). There she began research looking at nitrogen in streams. She received an M.S. in civil engineering from the University of Minnesota and a Ph.D. in civil engineering with an environmental emphasis from the University of Colorado Boulder. She then completed postdoctoral research in geosciences at Princeton University.

== Career ==
Baeseman is the executive director of the Scientific Committee on Antarctic Research (SCAR). Previously, she was the executive director of the World Climate Research Program (WCRP) Climate and Cryosphere, and the founding director of the Association of Polar Early Career Scientists (APECS).

Baeseman's research concerns the survival mechanisms of bacteria in cold environments and possible applications of their biochemistry. She has published in the fields of microbial ecology, polar and climate science, and education and communication of polar science. She has spent three summer seasons in the McMurdo Dry Valleys of Antarctica and periods living in Fairbanks, Alaska and Tromsø, Norway. She also participated in a Students On Ice Antarctic University expedition to the Antarctic Peninsula.

== Awards and honors ==
Baeseman is a Distinguished Alumni at the University of Wisconsin Stevens Point. She was included in the 2007 Who's Who in Science and Engineering and in the 2006-2008 Who's Who in America. In 2006, Baeseman received the Editor's Excellence in Review Citation from JGR Biogeosciences. As an undergraduate, Baeseman received the 1996 and 1998 UWSP Chancellor's Leadership Award, the 1997 Sigma Xi Outstanding Undergraduate Research Award, and was American Water Resources Association (AWRA)'s 1995 Student of the Year.
