= Straumsvola Mountain =

Mountain in Queen Maud Land, Antarctica

Straumsvola Mountain (72°7′S 0°20′W) is a prominent mountain 6 nautical miles (11 km) north of Jutulrora Mountain in the northwest part of the Sverdrup Mountains, overlooking the east side of Jutulstraumen Glacier in Queen Maud Land. Plotted from air photos by the German Antarctic Expedition (1938–39). Remapped by Norwegian cartographers from surveys and air photos by Norwegian-British-Swedish Antarctic Expedition (NBSAE) (1949–52) and air photos by the Norwegian expedition (1958–59) and named Straumsvola (the stream mountain).

== See also ==
- Ottehallet Slope
