= Robin Heights =

Mountain in Queen Maud Land, Antarctica

Robin Heights (72°27′S 0°38′E), also known as Robinheia is a cluster of high rock summits between Hei Glacier and Kvitsvodene Valley in the Sverdrup Mountains, Queen Maud Land. It was photographed from the air by the German Antarctic Expedition (1938–39). It was mapped by Norwegian cartographers from surveys and air photos by the Norwegian-British-Swedish Antarctic Expedition (NBSAE) (1949–52) and air photos by the Norwegian expedition (1958–59), and was named for Australian physicist Gordon de Quetteville Robin, third in command with the NBSAE.
