= Roots Heights =

Mountain in Queen Maud Land, Antarctica

Roots Heights (72°37′S 0°27′E) is an ice-free heights between Reece Valley and Skarsdalen Valley in the Sverdrup Mountains, Queen Maud Land. Photographed from the air by the German Antarctic Expedition (1938–39). Mapped by Norwegian cartographers from surveys and air photos by Norwegian-British-Swedish Antarctic Expedition (NBSAE) (1949–52) and air photos by the Norwegian expedition (1958–59). Named for Ernest Frederick Roots, chief geologist with the NBSAE.

== See also ==
- Liljequist Heights
- Hamrane Heights
