= Brattskarvet Mountain =

Mountain in Antarctica

Brattskarvet Mountain (72°6′S 1°27′E) is a mountain, 2,100 metres (6,900 ft) high, next north of Vendeholten Mountain in the Sverdrup Mountains of Queen Maud Land. It was photographed from the air by the Third German Antarctic Expedition (1938–39). It was mapped by Norwegian cartographers from surveys and air photos by the Norwegian–British–Swedish Antarctic Expedition (1949–52) and from air photos by the Norwegian expedition (1958–59) and named Brattskarvet (the "steep mountain").

== See also ==
- Brattskarvbrekka Pass
- Mount Hedden, 1 nautical mile (2 km) north of Brattskarvet Mountain
