= Tverrveggen Ridge =

Ridge in Antarctica

Tverrveggen Ridge (72°17′S 1°20′E) is a prominent ridge which extends southward for 4 nautical miles (7 km) from Tverrbrekka Pass in the Sverdrup Mountains, Queen Maud Land. Photographed from the air by the German Antarctic Expedition (1938–39). Mapped by Norwegian cartographers from surveys and air photos by Norwegian-British-Swedish Antarctic Expedition (NBSAE) (1949–52) and air photos by the Norwegian expedition (1958–59) and named Tverrveggen (the transverse wall).
