= Jutulrøra Mountain =

Mountain in Queen Maud Land, Antarctica

Jutulrøra Mountain (72°15′S 0°27′W) is a prominent mountain 6 nautical miles (11 km) south of Straumsvola Mountain in the western part of the Sverdrup Mountains, overlooking the east side of Jutulstraumen Glacier in Queen Maud Land, Antarctica. It was plotted from air photos by the Third German Antarctic Expedition (1938–39), was remapped from surveys and air photos by the Norwegian–British–Swedish Antarctic Expedition (1949–52) and from air photos by the Norwegian expedition (1958–59), and named Jutulrøra (the giant's pipe).
