= Hamrane Heights =

Mountain in Queen Maud Land, Antarctica

The Hamrane Heights (72°32′S 0°36′E) are ice-free heights between Skarsdalen Valley and Hei Glacier in the Sverdrup Mountains of Queen Maud Land, Antarctica. They were photographed from the air by the Third German Antarctic Expedition (1938–39). The heights were mapped by Norwegian cartographers from surveys and air photos by Norwegian–British–Swedish Antarctic Expedition (1949–52) and from air photos by the Norwegian expedition (1958–59) and named Hamrane (the crags).
