= Alan Reece =

Alan Richard Reece
- Born: 7 March 1927; London
- Died: 31 December 2012 (aged 85); Wylam, Northumberland
- Occupations: Engineer and entrepreneur

Alan Richard Reece (1927–2012) was the owner director of Pearson Engineering Ltd, Newcastle upon Tyne. In 2012 his company won the Queen's Award for Enterprise in Innovation. Pearson Engineering developed a range of counter-mine rollers that attach to the front of wheeled and tracked military vehicles to trigger an explosion as they drive over improvised explosive devices. The rollers get blown up and the main vehicle and its occupants stay safe.

== Early life ==
He was born in London, 7 March 1927, the son of Richard Reece and Olive Reece. In 1948 he married Doreen Harrison, with whom he had two sons and a daughter.

== Education and career ==
He was educated at Harrow County School for Boys and then Kings College (which had been part of Durham University and was later renamed the University of Newcastle upon Tyne), where he was awarded a BSc in mechanical engineering in 1947 and an MSc in agricultural engineering in 1950. Other qualifications include a MIMechE in 1957 and a MIAgrE 1960. His PhD was awarded by the University of Newcastle upon Tyne in 1964.

He graduated as an apprentice at Vickers Armstrong Ltd, Newcastle upon Tyne in 1948; and was a management trainee for the Ford Motor Company, in Dagenham from 1950 to 1952. He worked as a product engineer for International Harvester Co., Doncaster from 1952 to 1956, and then became an academic. He was lecturer, senior lecturer and then reader in agricultural engineering at the University of Newcastle upon Tyne from 1956 to 1984.

While still a lecturer he founded Soil Machine Dynamics Ltd in 1971. He applied soil mechanics to the design of earth-moving equipment. In the 1970s and 1980s large numbers of undersea cables were being laid but many were being damaged by trawler dragnets. Dr Reece found a way of burying cables under the seabed with a giant plough, which increased the reliability of international telephone calls and cut the cost of laying cables.

He was visiting scientist to the US Army Tank Automotive Centre, Detroit from 1962 to 1963; editor of the Journal of Terramechanics from 1963 to 1973; and founder member and first president of the International Society for Terrain Vehicle Systems, 1964–67. He was lecturer in the Strategic Leadership Programme, Templeton College, Oxford, 1984–92. He was awarded an honorary doctorate by the University of Newcastle upon Tyne in 2006 and given a lifetime achievement award, by the Entrepreneurs' Forum in 2009. He was ranked in fifth place in Management Today's Top 100 Entrepreneurs for 2011.

He established the Reece Foundation in 2007 to channel company profits to good causes. In 2011 he was ranked third in the Sunday Times Giving List, with donations of over £20m. He was the biggest single donor to Cambridge University's Institute for Manufacturing in 2009, whose new research building is named in his honour.

He died on 31 December 2012. Obituaries were published in the Guardian, the Daily Telegraph and The Times.

== Publications ==
Reece, Alan, Reviving British Manufacturing, Civitas, 2011.
