= Association of Polar Early Career Scientists =

International scientific association

The Association of Polar Early Career Scientists (APECS) is a worldwide association of early career scientists (undergraduate and graduate students, postdocs, and early career faculty) interested in the polar regions and the cryosphere generally. Its mission is to raise the profile of polar scientists by providing a continuum of leadership that is both internationally and interdisciplinarily focused, and to stimulate collaborative projects. Several countries (Australia, Brazil, Bulgaria, Canada, Chile, Denmark, France, Germany, India, Italy, Norway, Poland, Portugal, Russia, South Africa, Sweden, the United Kingdom and the United States) have their own APECS chapters that focus on the needs and ideas of scholars country-wise.

The APECS website serves as the main contact point for APECS members and provides forums for sharing news, connecting with other polar researchers, finding jobs, and announcing events relevant to polar research.

APECS is an endorsed International Polar Year (IPY) project and is considered one of the major legacies of IPY.

== History and motivation ==
A crucial event in the formation of APECS was a meeting in Sånga Säby, Sweden, in September 2007. This meeting saw founders and members representatives of two key initiatives combine together under the name of APECS: the International Polar Year Youth Steering Committee (YSC) formed in 2005 and including several national YSC's, and a formative APECS, formed in 2006.

=== International Polar Year Youth Steering Committee ===
The International Polar Year (IPY) Youth Steering Committee (YSC) was founded in 2005 by Amber Church and Tyler Kuhn (co-chairs, Canada), Melianie Raymond (New Zealand), Jenny Baeseman (USA), Hugues Lantuit (Germany), Elie Verleyen (Belgium) and Stef Bokhorst (The Netherlands). Its aims were to ensure that IPY's goals included the next generation of polar researchers and the world's youth were met. The YSC was designed as a decentralized institution relying on national committees, which rapidly came to life in several countries, including Canada, Germany, New Zealand, Portugal, Sweden, and the United Kingdom, among others. Those committees rapidly gained independence and developed their own networks as exemplified by the creation of the UK Polar Network in 2007. A contributing factor to the success of the YSC's during the IPY was strong support from the IPY International Program Office (IPO), based in Cambridge, UK, who ensured that the goals of the YSC would be heard in the community of senior researchers. The roles of Dave Carlson and Rhian Salmon, in particular, were crucial.

The YSC's focus was the creation, fostering and promotion of activities geared towards youth. It largely focused on the involvement of school children and young adults in polar literacy projects and strengthening the communication between students and young researchers. Progressively, a need for a broader, more encompassing organization specifically geared towards young researchers and early career scientists arose.

=== Early APECS ===
Discussions on IPY education and outreach forums, similar initiatives in other scientific realms and the encounter of like-minded people created an awareness of the need for an organization driven by and serving early career researchers, focused on science and career development, unlike the YSC. In the autumn of 2006, to address these needs, Jenny Baeseman (USA), Hugues Lantuit (Germany) and Rhian Salmon (UK) laid the grounds for the rationale, structure, connections and future activities of APECS. The acronym was coined at the time and a nascent APECS was launched massively in early 2007, at the start of the IPY with Baseman and Lantuit as co-directors.

In March 2007, discussions were initiated by the directors with the International Arctic Science Committee (IASC) and the Scientific Committee on Antarctic Research (SCAR) to offer APECS's services as representative of early career researchers in polar science. This early version of APECS then started evolving to serve better the needs of early career researchers interested in the polar regions and the wider cryosphere.

The YSC's activities developed concurrently with many (if not most) of the early career researchers involved in both organizations. Its scope, however, was limited in time, since it mainly focused on creating activities during the 2007/2008 IPY. The need to ensure the continuation of successful initiatives and activities after the IPY led to brainstorming on post-IPY legacy. At the same time, the increase in young researcher initiatives in polar science started to create some confusion in the scientific community, questioning the structure, coordination and even the relevance of such organizations.

=== Sånga Säby meeting ===
To address these issues, a meeting was organized at Sånga Säby outside Stockholm, Sweden in September 2007 to bring together all these groups and prepare some long-term sustainable plans. The meeting was sponsored by the Swedish company Serla, the IPY IPO, and other international polar science entities. The key outcomes of this meeting were the decisions to merge these groups, including the YSC, into one organization, retaining the name of APECS, and that APECS should adapt its structure to reflect better the multifaceted nature of its membership. This established APECS as a legacy of the YSC and other IPY projects. A new structure was launched at the end of the meeting including working groups, an advisory committee, an interim Council of the 24 attending participants (see below), an interim Executive Committee elected by the council Kriss Rokkan Iversen (Norway), Narelle Baker (UK), Hugues Lantuit (Germany), Dan Pringle (USA), and José Xavier (Portugal), and Jen Baeseman (USA) was appointed as an interim director. Kriss Rokkan Iversen received unanimous support of all voters and appointed by the Executive Committee as the interim President of APECS.

=== 2008-Present ===
The Executive Committee and Director were charged with establishing APECS as an organization over the next 6–12 months. A report of activities in this period was made at the online APECS Council Meeting, 21 May 2008. Key progress included forming an international Advisory Committee of senior researchers and science administrators to provide guidance and support. A website was developed by in kind support from Iceland-based Arctic Portal through the generous support of director Halldór Jóhannsson. The website was established as a virtual home of APECS and amongst other features, includes study and job opportunities, meetings, news updates, and a discussion forum.

The executive committee met in March 2008 in Akureyri, Iceland to address strategic planning for APECS and draft the documents that will help sustain this organization for year to come: the Terms of Reference and the Rules of Procedure. This meeting was coordinated by Halldór Jóhannsson and supported by the University of Akureyri, Northern Research Forum and the Arctic Portal.

The ROP and TOR included a revision from the interim APECS structure to an open Council who elect an Executive Committee. The Council controls issues related to APECS governance and structure, and is expected to act on time scales of months – years. The Executive Committee is mandated by the Council with shorter time-scale decision making and running APECS on a day-to-day basis. (See the founding ROP and TOR for details.)

The organization now has an International Directorate Office hosted at the University of Tromsø, Norway.

== Membership ==
The association represents people with a wide range of scientific expertise and interests including glaciology, geology, geodesy, anthropology, sociology, political science, atmospheric science, oceanography, polar biology, culture and heritage studies, linguistics, space studies, biogeochemistry, and paleontology.

Membership in APECS is free and open to all early career scientists interested in natural and social sciences of the polar regions, from undergraduates through assistant professors or equivalent for non-academic positions. Participation by engineers and those interested in the cryosphere in general is also being sought. APECS encourages senior researchers to register on the APECS website and serve as mentors for the organization as well as post job openings and events at their institutions.
