= United Nations System-wide Earthwatch =

United Nations environmental initiative

United Nations System-wide Earthwatch is an initiative set up by the United Nations to bring together environmental observations by UN agencies within a consistent framework.

== Formation and mandate ==
Earthwatch was established in 1972 to "monitor major global disturbance in the environment and to give early warning of problems requiring international action". The program is coordinated by the United Nations Environmental Programme (UNEP). The focus is on providing data to support decision-making in response to the UN General Assembly resolution on "Strengthening International Cooperation in the Monitoring of Global Environmental Problems". The mandate was strengthened by the 1992 UN Conference on Environment and Development in Rio de Janeiro and its Agenda-21 chapter on Information for Decision Making.

== Organization ==
The UNEP Division of Early Warning and Assessment provides the Earthwatch Secretariat, based in Nairobi. Since September 2002 the Secretariat has been supported by DEWA/GRID-Europe. The Earthwatch unit in Geneva maintains contact with UN agencies and develops the Earthwatch website. This site is an important source of information on environmental and development information for scientists and the public.

== Evolution ==
It became clear at the 2002 World Summit on Sustainable Development in Johannesburg that there was a need to pursue Agenda 21, to improve global data collection and monitoring, to improve open communications and to eliminate duplicate efforts. This led to a Plan of Implementation with a 10-20-year horizon under which Earthwatch would focus on collecting and correlating data related to the Millennium Development Goals. Earthwatch would also identify gaps in available data.

At the 8th Earthwatch meeting in mid-October 2004 it was agreed to improve collaboration between UN agencies. The UN Environment Management Group (EMG) had been set up to coordinate UN agencies in areas related to the environment and human settlements, playing a valuable role in setting policy. It was agreed that Earthwatch and the EMG were complementary and could benefit from sharing results. It was also agreed to consider ways in which Earthwatch could better communicate information.
