= Kvitkjølen Ridge =

Rock ridge in Queen Maud Land, Antarctica

Kvitkjølen Ridge (72°24′S 0°49′E) is a rock ridge between ice filled Kvitsvodene Valley and Ising Glacier in the Sverdrup Mountains of Queen Maud Land, Antarctica. It was photographed from the air by the Third German Antarctic Expedition (1938–39). The ridge was mapped by Norwegian cartographers from surveys and air photos by the Norwegian–British–Swedish Antarctic Expedition (1949–52) and air photos by the Norwegian expedition (1958–59) and named Kvitkjølen (the white keel).
