= Mount Roer =

Mountain in Queen Maud Land, Antarctica

Mount Roer (72°18′S 0°21′E) is an isolated mountain, 2,085 m, standing 7 nautical miles (13 km) west of Fuglefjellet in the Sverdrup Mountains, Queen Maud Land. Photographed from the air by the German Antarctic Expedition (1938–39). Mapped by Norwegian cartographers from surveys and air photos by Norwegian-British-Swedish Antarctic Expedition (NBSAE) (1949–52) and air photos by the Norwegian expedition (1958–59). Named for Nils Roer, surveyor with the NBSAE.
