= Isingen Mountain =

Mountain in Queen Maud Land, Antarctica

Isingen Mountain (72°23′S 1°4′E) is a large icecapped mass, through which protrude several rock peaks, between Ising Glacier and Rogstad Glacier in the Sverdrup Mountains of Queen Maud Land, Antarctica. It was photographed from the air by the Third German Antarctic Expedition (1938–39). It was mapped by Norwegian cartographers from surveys and air photos by the Norwegian–British–Swedish Antarctic Expedition(1949–52) and from air photos by the Norwegian expedition (1958–59) and named Isingen (the icing).
