= Vendeholten Mountain =

Mountain in Queen Maud Land, Antarctica

Vendeholten Mountain (72°12′S 1°20′E) is a 2,230 m tall mountain standing north of Tverrbrekka Pass in the Sverdrup Mountains, Queen Maud Land. It was photographed from the air by the German Antarctic Expedition (1938–39), and mapped by Norwegian cartographers from surveys and air photos by Norwegian-British-Swedish Antarctic Expedition (NBSAE) (1949–52) and air photos by Norwegian expedition (1958–59) and named Vendeholten.
