= Sverdrup Mountains =

Mountain range in Queen Maud Land, Antarctica

- Map depicting the territorial extent of Queen Maud Land

Highest point
- Peak: Hamartind Peak
- Elevation: 2,855 m (9,367 ft)
- Coordinates: 72°20′S 01°00′E

Naming
- Native name: Sverdrupfjella (Norwegian)

Geography
- Continent: Antarctica
- Region(s): Queen Maud Land, East Antarctica
- Parent range: Fimbulheimen

The Sverdrup Mountains (Norwegian: Sverdrupfjella) are a group of mountains about 80 km (50 mi) long, standing just west of the Gjelsvik Mountains in Queen Maud Land, East Antarctica. With its summit at 2,855 metres (9,367 ft), Hamartind Peak forms the highest point in the Sverdrup Mountains.

== Discovery and naming ==
First photographed from the air and roughly plotted by the Third German Antarctic Expedition (3rd GAE), 1938–1939. Mapped in detail by Norwegian cartographers from surveys and aerial photographs taken by the Norwegian–British–Swedish Antarctic Expedition (NBSAE), and again by a later Norwegian expedition. Named for Harald Sverdrup, Chairman of the Norwegian Committee for the NBSAE.

== Norwegian–British–Swedish Antarctic Expedition ==
Norwegian–British–Swedish Antarctic Expedition (NBSAE), 1949–1952

== Norwegian Expedition ==
Luncke Expedition, 1958–1959

== List of important geographical features of the Sverdrup Mountains ==
Map depicting the location of the Sverdrup Mountains in Queen Maud Land, Antarctica

Name of feature	Coordinates	Altitude	Discovery	Notes
Alan Peak	72°39′S 00°11′E		3rd GAE	A peak at the west side of the mouth of Reece Valley, in the southern part of the Sverdrup Mountains. Remapped by Norwegian cartographers from surveys and aerial photographs taken by the NBSAE and later by the NE. Named for Alan Reece, geologist of the NBSAE, and earlier with the Falkland Islands Dependencies Survey (FIDS).
Barkley Mountains	72°22′S 01°00′E		3rd GAE	Remapped by Norwegian cartographers from surveys and aerial photographs taken by the NBSAE and later by the NE. Named for Erich Barkley, biologist of the 3rd GAE.
Brattskarvet Mountain	72°06′S 01°27′E	2100 meters	3rd GAE	Remapped by Norwegian cartographers from surveys and aerial photographs taken by the NBSAE and later by the NE. Named Brattskarvet (the steep mountain).
Fuglefjellet	72°17′S 00°46′E		3rd GAE	7 nautical miles (13 km) east of Mount Roer. Remapped by Norwegian cartographers from surveys and aerial photographs taken by the NBSAE and later by the NE. Named Fuglefjellet (the bird mountain).
Gburek Peaks	72°11′S 00°15′W		3rd GAE	A group of rocky elevations including Straumsvola Mountain and Jutulrora Mountain, forming the western end of the Sverdrup Mountains. Remapped by Norwegian cartographers from surveys and aerial photographs taken by the NBSAE and later by the NE. Named for Leo Gburek, geophysicist of the 3rd GAE.
Hamartind Peak	72°33′S 00°39′E			
Isingen Mountain	72°23′S 01°04′E			
Joungane Peaks	72°04′S 00°17′W			
Jutulrora Mountain	72°15′S 00°27′W			
Kvitho Peak	72°29′S 01°13′E			
Kvithovden Peak	72°22′S 00°45′E			
Kvitkjolen Ridge				
Kvitsvodene Valley				
Mount Brandt	72°10′S 01°07′E			
Mount Krüger	72°36′S 00°57′E	2655 meters	3rd GAE	The summit of Krügerfjellet, 8 miles (13 km) southwest of Kvitho Peak, is the highest point in the Sverdrup Mountains. Named for Walter Krüger, meteorological assistant on the 3rd GAE.
Mount Roer	72°18′S 00°21′E			
Nupskapa Peak	72°43′S 00°16′E			
Oppkuven Peak	72°37′S 00°24′E			
Paulsen Mountains	72°10′S 01°21′E		3rd GAE	A group of mountains including Brattskarvet Mountain, Vendeholten Mountain and Tverrveggen Ridge, located in the northern part of the Sverdrup Mountains. Named for Karl-Heinz Paulsen, oceanographer on the expedition.
Rogstad Glacier				
Romlingane Peaks	72°11′S 01°08′E			
Salknappen Peak	72°19′S 01°02′E			
Snarby Peak	72°02′S 01°37′E			
Sorhausane Peaks	72°47′S 00°15′E			
Storjoen Peak	72°07′S 00°12′W			
Straumsvola Mountain	72°07′S 00°20′W			
Tverrveggen Ridge	72°17′S 01°20′E		3rd GAE	Remapped by Norwegian cartographers from surveys and aerial photographs taken by the NBSAE and later by the NE. Named Tverrveggen (the transverse wall).
Tvora	72°10′S 00°05′W			
Vendeholten Mountain	72°12′S 01°20′E			

== See also ==
- List of mountains of Queen Maud Land
- Nils Plain
