= Zub (disambiguation) =

Zub is a 1986 computer game.

Zub or ZUB may also refer to:

- Zub (surname)
- ZUB 1xx, a family of train protection systems produced by Siemens
- Zub Lake, Queen Maud Land, Antarctica

== See also ==
- Sub (disambiguation)
