= Palets Rock =

Isolated rock in Antarctica

Palets Rock (70°46′S 11°36′E) is an isolated rock which rises above the ice midway between Aerodromnaya Hill and the Schirmacher Hills, in Queen Maud Land. First photographed from the air and roughly mapped by the German Antarctic Expedition, 1938–39. Remapped by the Soviet Antarctic Expedition in 1961 and named Skala Palets (toe rock).
