= Podprudnoye Lake =

Lake in Antarctica

- Location within Antarctica
- Location: Schirmacher Hills, Queen Maud Land, Antarctica
- Coordinates: 70°45′S 11°37′E

Podprudnoye Lake is a small lake lying just southeast of Prilednikovoye Lake in Schirmacher Hills, Queen Maud Land. It was mapped by the Soviet Antarctic Expedition in 1961 and named Ozero Podprudnoye ("by-the-pond lake").
