= Sbrosovoye Lake =

- Ozero Sbrosovoye
- Location within Antarctica
- Location: Schirmacher Hills, Queen Maud Land, Antarctica
- Coordinates: 70°45′S 11°35′E
- Type: lake

Sbrosovoye Lake is a small lake 1 nautical mile (1.9 km; 1.2 mi) southwest of Tyuleniy Point in the Schirmacher Hills, Queen Maud Land. Mapped by the Soviet Antarctic Expedition in 1961 and named Ozero Sbrosovoye (fault lake).
