= Ozhidaniya Cove =

Cove in Antarctica

- Location within Antarctica
- Location: Schirmacher Hills, Queen Maud Land
- Coordinates: 70°44′S 11°39′E
- Type: Cove
- Etymology: Russian for "anticipation"

Ozhidaniya Cove (70°44′S 11°39′E) is a cove 0.5 nautical miles (0.93 km) east of Tyuleniy Point on the north side of Schirmacher Hills, Queen Maud Land. Nadezhdy Island lies across the mouth of the cove. Mapped by the Soviet Antarctic Expedition in 1961 and named "Zaliv Ozhidaniya" (anticipation cove).
