= Lazarev Sea =

Proposed name for a marginal sea of the Southern Ocean

Coordinates: 68°00′S 7°00′E

Proposed Lazarev Sea name as part of the Southern Ocean (at top of image)

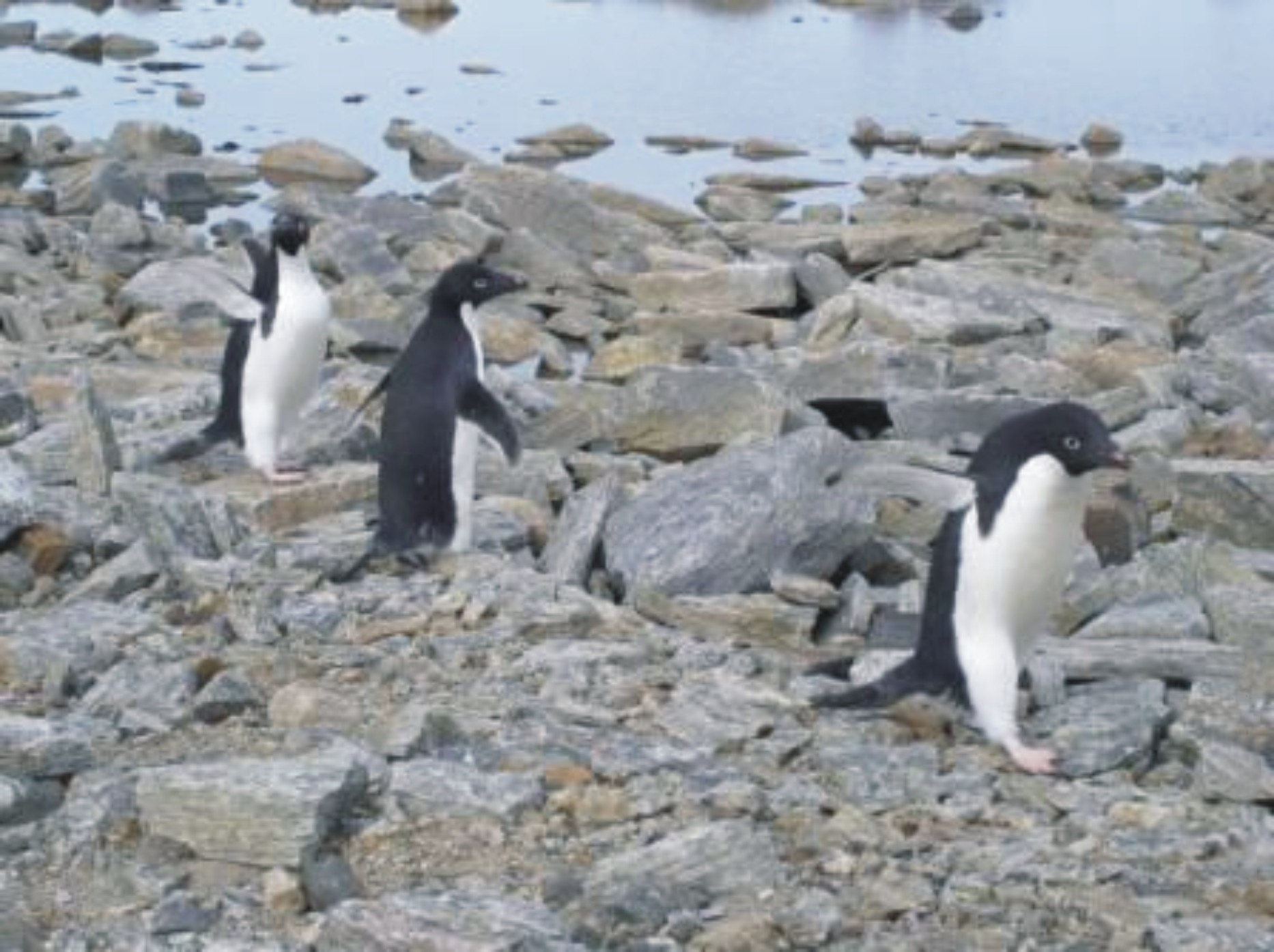
Adélie penguins near Novolazarevskaya Station, located at Schirmacher Oasis, Queen Maud Land, 75 km from the Antarctic coast, from which it is separated by Lazarev Ice Shelf

The Lazarev Sea (Russian: Море Лазарева, More Lazareva) is a proposed name for a marginal sea of the Southern Ocean. It would be bordered by two proposals from a 2002 International Hydrographic Organization (IHO) draft, a King Haakon VII Sea to the west and a Riiser-Larsen Sea to the east, or between the Prime Meridian of 0° and 14°E. It would stretch over an area of 929,000 km^{2} (359,000 sq mi).

== History ==
The Lazarev Sea was named in 1962 by the Soviet Antarctic Expedition in memory of Russian admiral Mikhail Lazarev (1788–1851), who discovered the Antarctic mainland with Fabian Gottlieb von Bellingshausen in 1820. The 2002 IHO draft was never approved by the IHO (or any other organization), and the 1953 IHO document (which does not contain this name) remains currently in force. Leading geographic authorities and atlases do not use the name, including the 2014 10th edition World Atlas from National Geographic Society and the 2014 12th edition of the Times Atlas of the World. But Soviet and Russian-state maps do.

== Physical geography ==
The prevailing depth of waters in the Lazarev Sea is 3,000 m (9,800 ft), and the maximum depth exceeds 4,500 m (14,800 ft). It stretches over an area of 929,000 km^{2} (359,000 sq mi).

To the south of the Lazarev Sea lies Princess Astrid Coast of Queen Maud Land.

The Lazarev Sea is a continental margin affected by multiple rifting episodes accompanied with transient volcanism. The Lazarev sea is also known to be very poor in sediment.
