= Dlinnoye Lake =

Lake in Antarctica

Dlinnoye Lake (70°44′S 11°39′E) is a narrow, serpentine lake, 0.5 nautical miles (1 km) long, lying close northwest of Tsentral'naya Hill in the Schirmacher Hills, Queen Maud Land. The feature was mapped by the Soviet Antarctic Expedition in 1961 and named "Ozero Dlinnoye" (long lake).
