= Prilednikovoye Lake =

Lake in Antarctica

- Location within Antarctica
- Location: Schirmacher Hills
- Coordinates: 70°45′S 11°35′E
- Basin countries: (Antarctica)

Prilednikovoye Lake (70°45′S 11°35′E) is a lake 1.25 nautical miles (2.3 km) south-southwest of Tyuleniy Point in the Schirmacher Hills, situated at the edge of the continental ice sheet in Queen Maud Land. Mapped by the Soviet Antarctic Expedition in 1961 and named "Ozero Prilednikovoye" ("fore-glacier lake"), presumably for its location.
