= Secluded Rocks =

Secluded Rocks (67°32′S 59°20′E) is a low, prominently-banded rocky outcropping between Mulebreen and Cosgrove Glacier, standing 6 nautical miles (11 km) south-southwest of Kemp Peak, Enderby Land. Mapped from ANARE (Australian National Antarctic Research Expeditions) surveys and air photos, 1954–66, and so named because the rocks are situated in a hollow.
