= Stillwell Hills =

Hills in Antarctica

Coordinates: 67°26′S 59°28′E

Stillwell Hills is a group of largely snow-free rocky hills composed of banded gneisses and including Kemp Peak and Lealand Bluff, extending along the southwest side of William Scoresby Bay. This area was explored by Discovery Investigations personnel on the RSS William Scoresby in February 1936, and by the Lars Christensen Expedition, 1936–37, the latter group taking air photos used to map these hills for the first time. Geologic investigation of the area was made by Australian National Antarctic Research Expeditions (ANARE) in 1961. Named by ANCA for Dr. Frank Leslie Stillwell, geologist with Australasian Antarctic Expedition (AAE), 1911–14, who derived a theory of metamorphic differentiation from banded gneisses of the same type on George V Coast.
