= Astrid Ridge =

Undersea ridge in Antarctica

- Location within Antarctica

Highest point
- Coordinates: 68°S 12°E

Astrid Ridge is an undersea ridge on the continental margin of Dronning Maud Land, East Antarctica. It is present on the GEBCO 5th edition charts. The name was approved by the Advisory Committee for Undersea Features in June 1987.

The ocean along the continental margin of Dronning Maud Land, the Riiser-Larsen and Lazarev seas, are dominated by three topographic features: Astrid Ridge, Maud Rise, a large volcanic plateau in the Lazarev Sea (3°E, 65°S), and Gunnerus Ridge (33.5°E), probably underlain by continental crust.

Astrid Ridge, extending from 65°S to the Antarctic margin and located between 9°E and 17°E, forms the eastern border of the Lazarev Sea and the western border of the Riiser-Larsen Sea. It is divided into two parts by the Astrid Fracture Zone: south of 67°S Astrid Ridge stretches N-S while the northern part follows the SW—NE direction of the fracture zone.

The geological evolution of the Astrid Ridge remains enigmatic. The Riiser-Larsen Sea is a conjugate basin to the Mozambique Basin (in the ocean east of southern Africa) and the two once formed the first ocean to open during the break-up of Gondwana. Astrid Ridge is a large volcanic features closely related to this 160 Ma break-up during which oceanic crust began to form in the Riiser-Larsen Sea. West of Astrid Ridge, however, neither oceanic crust nor magnetic anomalies have been found and this area is therefore interpreted as stretched continental crust and Astrid Ridge as a former continental margin created by volcanism during the break-up.
