= Akademik Aleksandr Karpinsky =

Russian research vessel

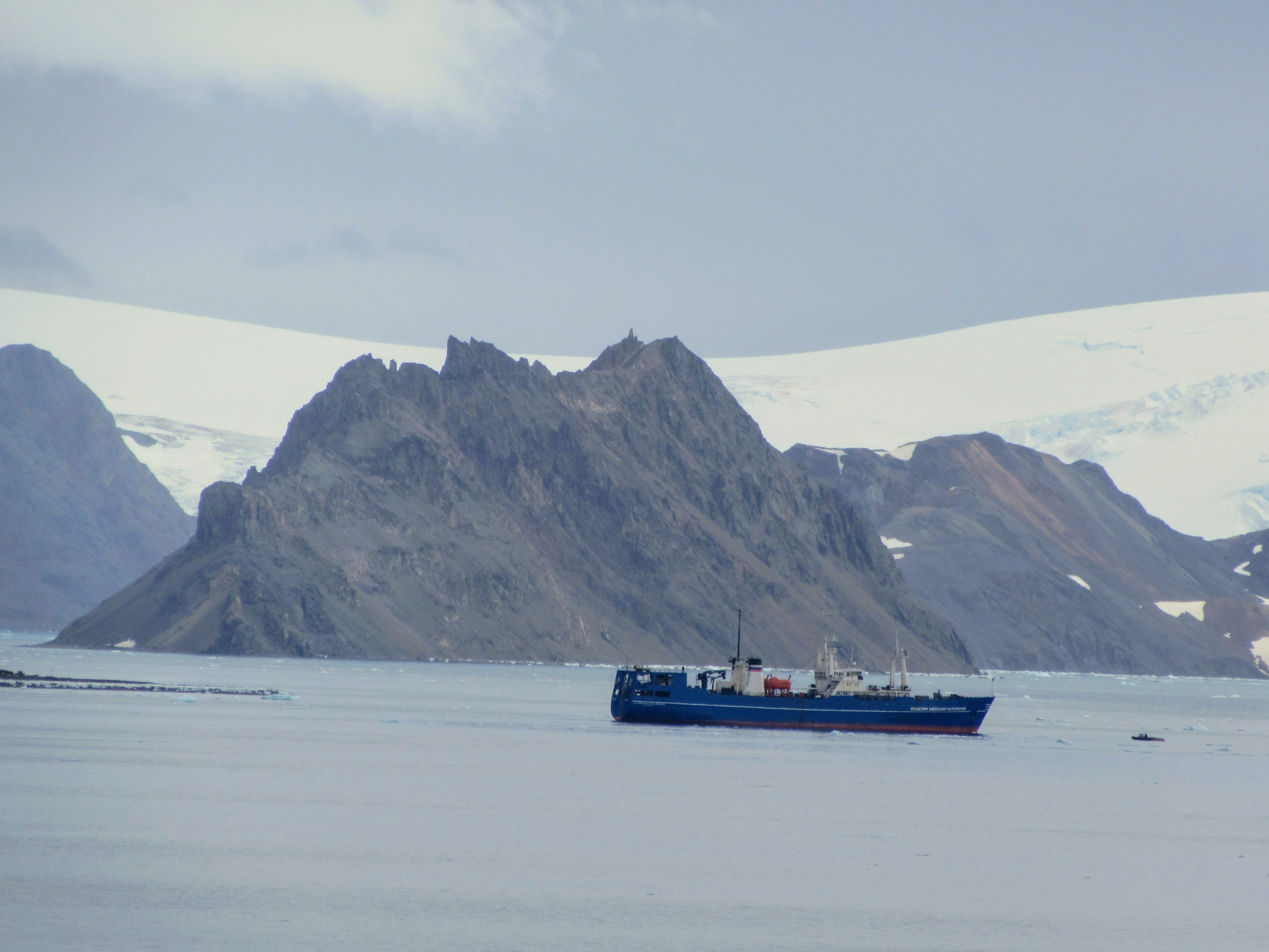
- RV Akademik Aleksandr Karpinsky in 2019 at Admiralty Bay, King George Island, Antarctica.

History

Russia
- Name: Akademik Aleksandr Karpinsky
- Owner: P.P. Shirshov Institute of Oceanology.
- Operator: Rosgeo
- Port of registry: Russia
- Builder: Mykolaiv, Ukraine
- Launched: 28 December 1980
- In service: 1984
- Refit: 1987
- Homeport: Sankt Petersburg, Russia
- Identification: IMO number: 7811018; MMSI number: 273411400; Callsign: UFJI
- Status: in active service

General characteristics
- Displacement: 6,240 tons
- Length: 122.2 m (400 ft 11 in)
- Beam: 17.82 m (58 ft 6 in)
- Height: 10.4 m (34 ft 1 in)
- Draft: 5.89 m (19 ft 4 in)
- Installed power: (4) diesel engines, 5,840 hp (4,350 kW) each
- Speed: 12.5 knots (23.2 km/h; 14.4 mph) max
- Range: 20,000 km (12,000 mi)
- Endurance: 303 days
- Boats & landing craft carried: Mir DSVs
- Complement: ~90

RV Akademik Alexandr Karpinsky is a Russian research vessel of the Russian state Geological Exploration Holding Rosgeo. The a Antarctic research vessel is capable of seismic and other geological research on the seabed. Homeport is Saint-Petersburg.

In 2024 the US government has imposed sanctions on Akademik Alexandr Karpinsky. The vessel has led extensive oil and gas surveys in Antarctica's Southern Ocean. The Akademik Alexandr Karpinsky sails under the flag of the Russian Antarctic Expedition (RAE), a continuously operating expedition of the Arctic and Antarctic Research Institute of the Federal Service for Hydrometeorology and Environmental Monitoring of Russia.

== Ship ==
The vessel of Project 12883M was built in 1984 in Nikolaev, Ukrainian SSR. In 2014 the ship was refit in Tallinn, Estonia.

== History ==
Stationed in the Baltic Sea the Akademik Alexander Karpinsky is as noted on the 1959 Antarctic Treaty's seasonal shipping database, registered to sail to West Antarctica's Amundsen and East Antarctica's Ross seas for "marine geological-geophysical studies". A 1998 amendment to the 55-nation Antarctic Treaty, to which Russia signed, prohibits all mineral explorations and extractions in the region. Akademik Alexandr Kapinsky has been in the Southern Ocean on an annual term, and has produced most of these investigations via Cape Town since. Russia is doing mineral exploration under the guise of scientific research, which is permissible under the Antarctic treaty.

In 2020, Rosgeo reported that Akademik Alexandr Karpinsky had completed a comprehensive sub-surface geological survey, mapping oil and gas bearing prospects on the Antarctic ice shelves. The study was part of the 65th Russian Antarctic expedition (RAE). At the time, the exploration covered the southeastern part of the Riiser-Larsen Sea off the coast of Queen Maud Land, which is claimed by Norway.

According to the United States Department of State, the Adademik Alexandr Karpinsky was sanctioned in February 2024 to mark two years since Russia's invasion of Ukraine on 24 February 2022 and the death of the opposition leader Alexei Navalny in a Siberian prison. Its sister vessel, the RV Professor Logachev has also been sanctioned. US citizens and companies are banned from conducting commercial transactions with the vessel's owners Rosgeo and the vessel is prevented from calling at US ports.
