= Antarctic oasis =

Ice free areas in Antarctica

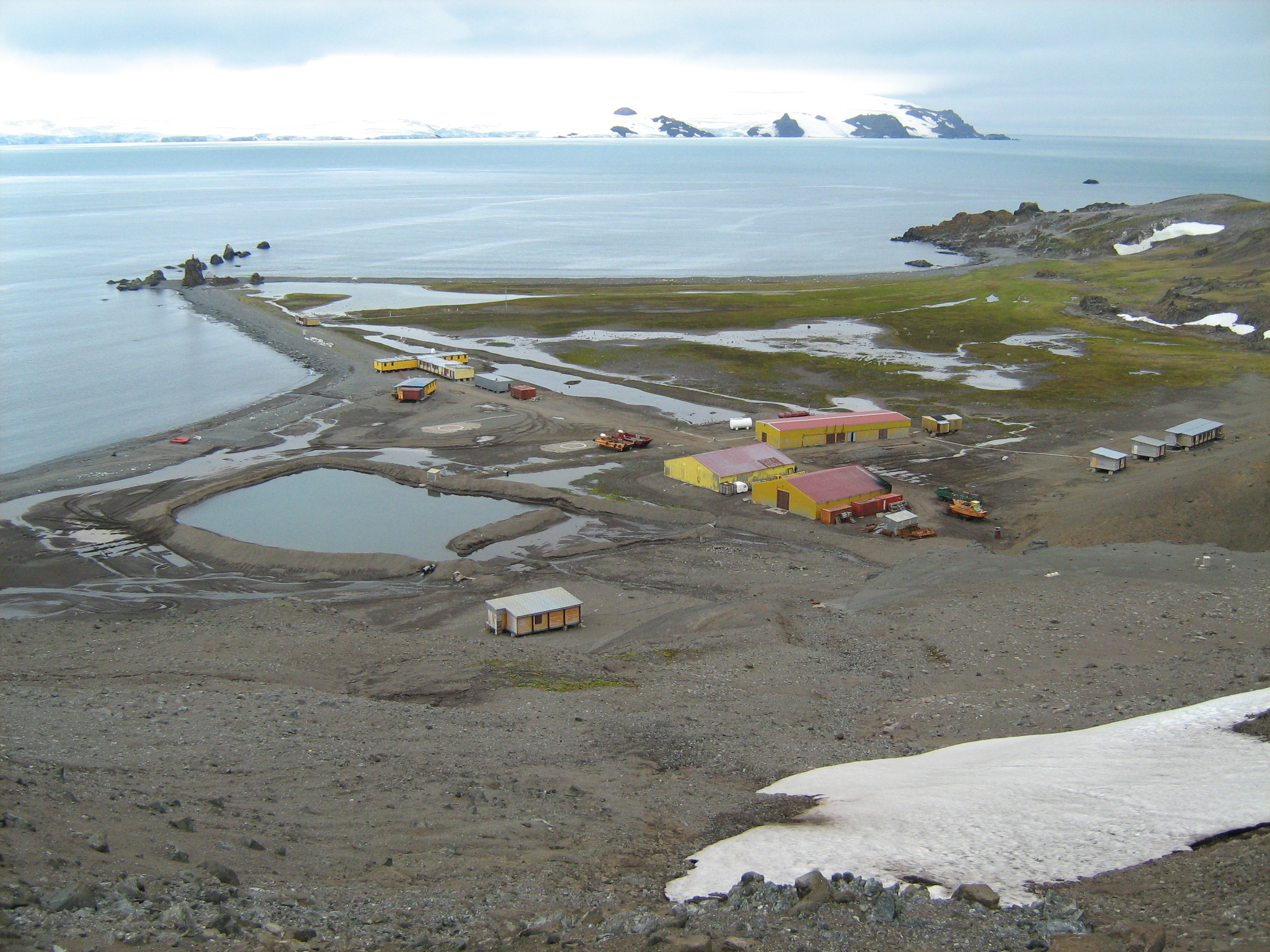
Henryk Arctowski Polish Antarctic Station, Arctowski Station, King George Island

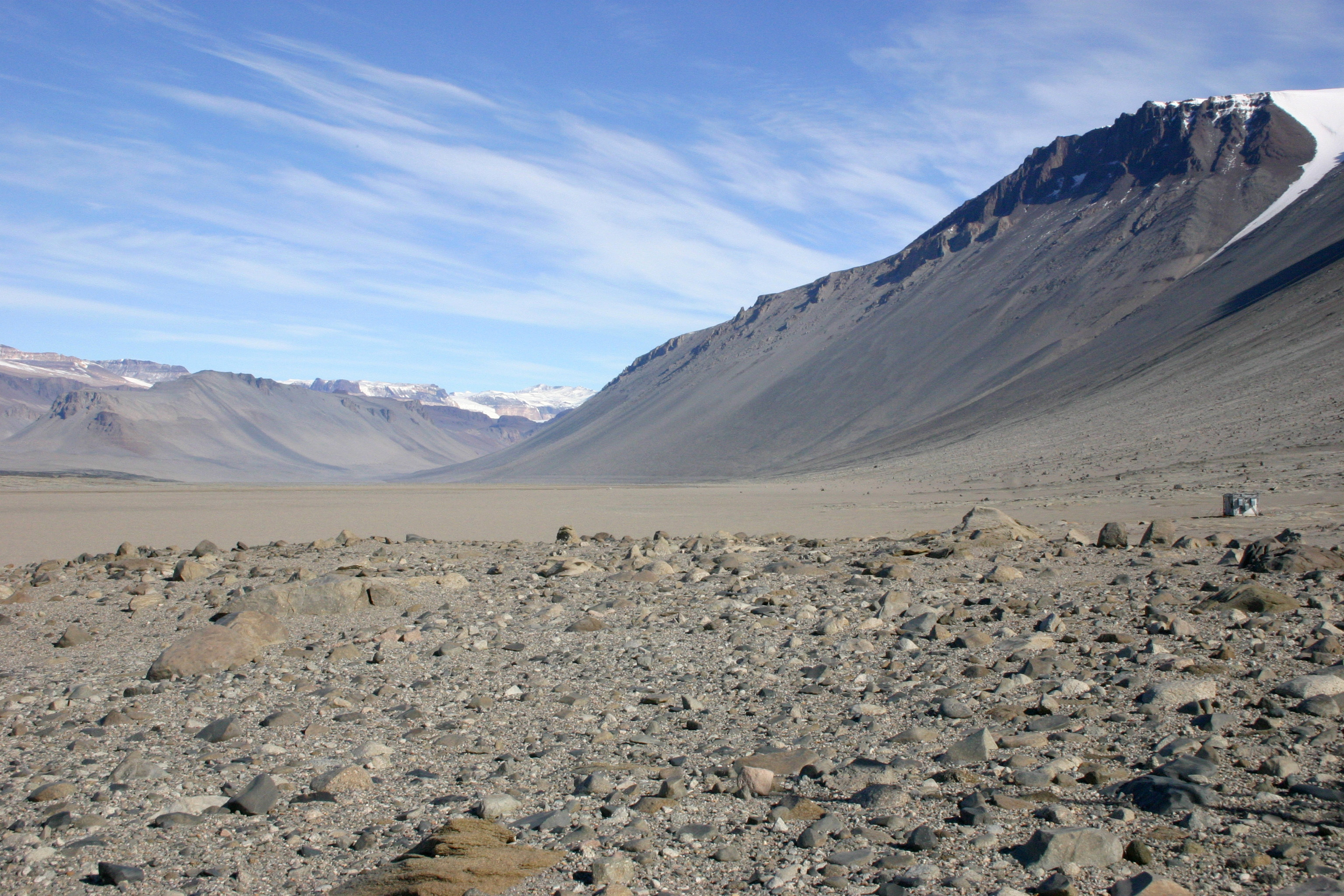
Wright Valley, McMurdo Dry Valleys

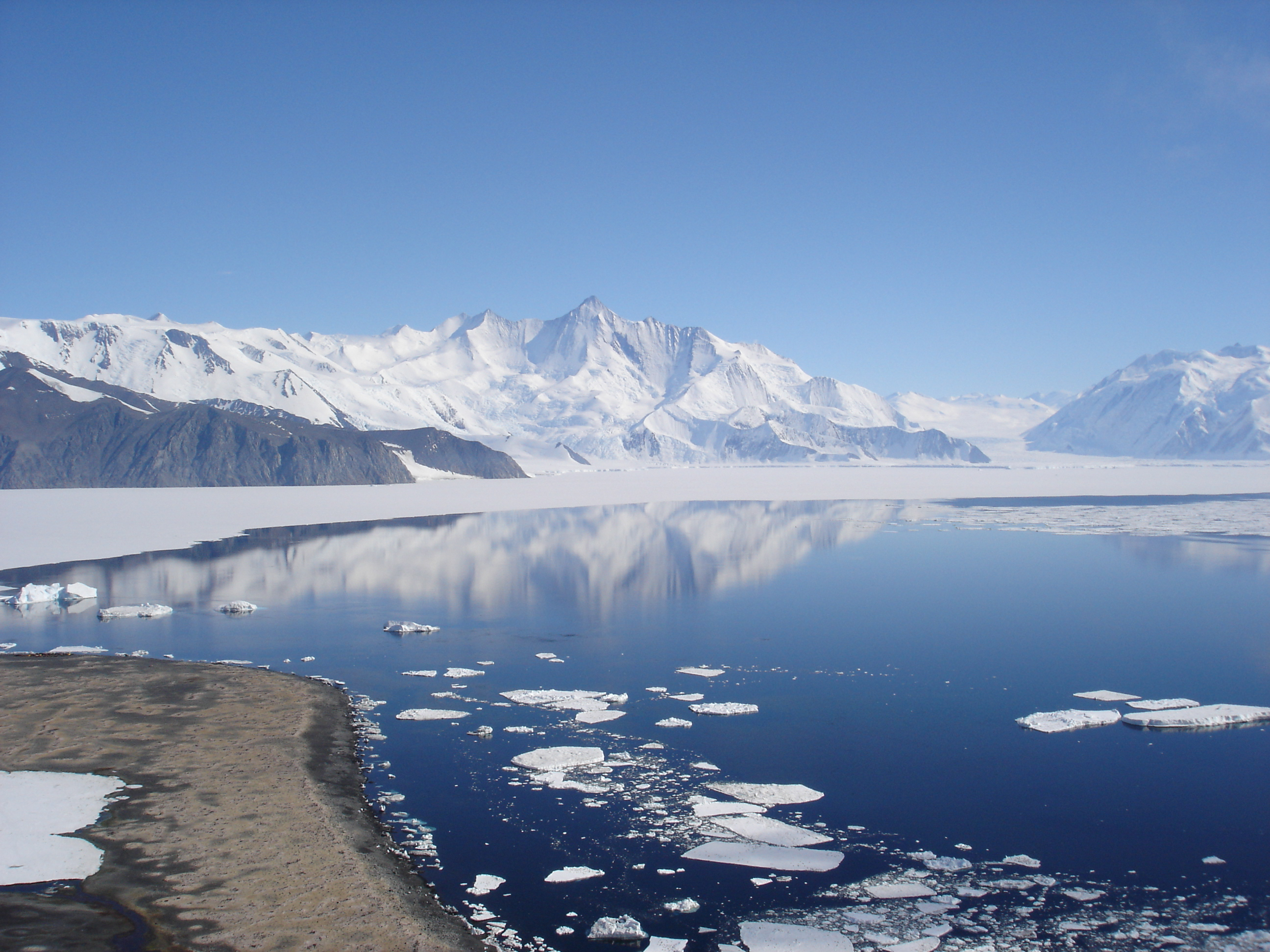
Cape Hallett, Victoria Land

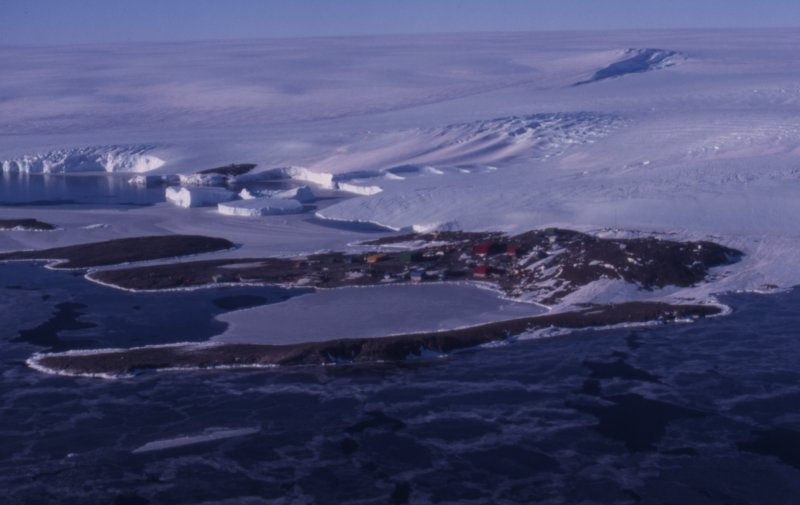
Holme Bay at Mawson Station, Mac. Robertson Land

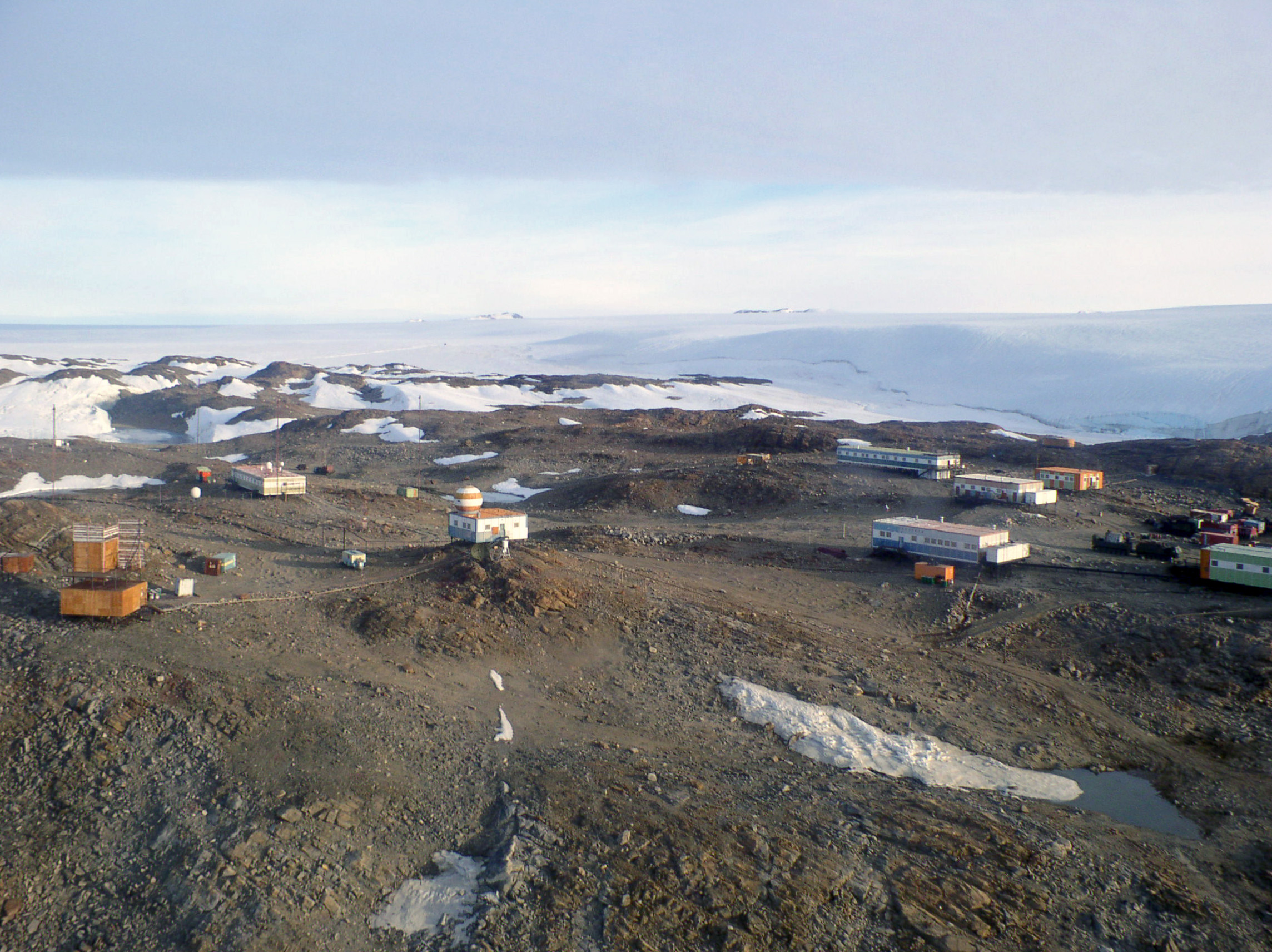
Schirmacher Oasis, Princess Astrid Coast

An Antarctic oasis is a large area naturally free of snow and ice in the otherwise ice-covered continent of Antarctica.

== Geology ==
In Antarctica there are, in addition to mountaintops and nunataks, other natural snow- and ice-free areas often referred to as "Antarctic oases" or "dry valleys". These areas are surrounded by the Antarctic ice sheet or, in coastal areas, are situated between the ice sheet and the Antarctic ice shelves.

Antarctic oases and dry valleys develop in areas with particular regional weather patterns and geography. These areas have very low humidity and precipitation. Although these areas are very cold, sufficient solar energy is absorbed by the ground to melt what little snow does fall, or else it is scoured or sublimated by katabatic winds, leaving the underlying rock exposed.

Despite usually extreme aridity, some plants, in the form of bryophytes and lichens, can survive in Antarctic oases.

== Geography ==
The larger oases (with their respective areas) are:

- McMurdo Dry Valleys (approx. 4,900 km^{2} (1,900 sq mi)), Victoria Land
- Cape Hallett, northern Victoria Land
- Bunger Hills (approx. 950 km^{2} (370 sq mi)), between Wilkes Land and Queen Mary Land
- Holme Bay, Mac. Robertson Land
- Vestfold Hills (approx. 420 km^{2} (160 sq mi)), Princess Elizabeth Land
- Larsemann Hills, Princess Elizabeth Land
- Stillwell Hills (approx. 96 km^{2} (37 sq mi)), Kemp Land
- Schirmacher Oasis (approx. 34 km^{2} (13 sq mi)), Princess Astrid Coast, Queen Maud Land
