= Uragannyy Point =

Uragannyy Point (69°57′S 12°50′E) is an ice point along the west edge of Lazarev Ice Shelf about 3 nautical miles (6 km) north of Leningradskiy Island, Queen Maud Land. Mapped by the Soviet Antarctic Expedition in 1959. They named it Mys Uragannyy (hurricane point) because a strong hurricane occurred during the stay of the ship Ob' near this point.
