= Institut Geologii Arktiki Rocks =

The Institut Geologii Arktiki Rocks (70°56′S 11°30′E) are a group of scattered rock outcrops that extend in an east–west direction for 20 miles (32 km), located 7 miles (11 km) south of the Schirmacher Hills in Queen Maud Land, Antarctica. They were discovered and plotted from air photos by the Third German Antarctic Expedition, 1938–39, and were mapped from air photos and surveys by the Sixth Norwegian Antarctic Expedition, 1956–60. They were remapped by the Soviet Antarctic Expedition, 1960–61, and named after the Soviet Institute of Arctic Geology.
