= Leningradskiy Bay =

Bay in Antarctica

Coordinates: 70°00′S 12°30′E

Leningradskiy Bay is an indentation in the ice shelf fringing Queen Maud Land, Antarctica, immediately west of Lazarev Ice Shelf. Leningradskiy Island is at the head of the bay. It was mapped by the Soviet Antarctic Expedition in 1959 and named by them for the Russian city that at that time was named Leningrad. Ostryy Point ("Angular Point"), an ice projection, forms the west side of the entrance to the bay. It was first mapped and named by the Soviet Antarctic Expedition.
