= Akkuratnaya Cove =

Cove in Antarctica

Akkuratnaya Cove (70°45′S 11°48′E) is a small cove 3 miles (5 km) east-southeast of Nadezhdy Island, indenting the north side of the Schirmacher Hills, Queen Maud Land. First photographed from the air by the Third German Antarctic Expedition, 1938–39. Mapped by the Soviet Antarctic Expedition in 1961 and named Bukhta Akkuratnaya ("accurate cove").
