= Aerodromnaya Hill =

Hill in Antarctica

Aerodromnaya Hill (70°47′S 11°38′E) is an isolated rock hill standing 1 mile (2 km) south of the Schirmacher Hills in Queen Maud Land. The hill was discovered and first roughly mapped from air photos by the German Antarctic Expedition, 1938–39. It was named Gora Aerodromnaya ("aerodrome hill") by the Soviet Antarctic Expedition, 1961, because a landing strip was established in the vicinity in connection with nearby Novolazarevskaya Station.
