= Razlom Point =

Geographical feature in Antarctica

Razlom Point (70°0′S 12°52′E) is an ice point at the west edge of Lazarev Ice Shelf, about 2 nautical miles (3.7 km) north of Leningradskiy Island, Queen Maud Land. Mapped by the Soviet Antarctic Expedition in 1959 and named Mys Razlom (breach point) because there is a large old break in the ice shelf nearby.
