= Russian bath in Antarctica =

Sauna in Antarctica

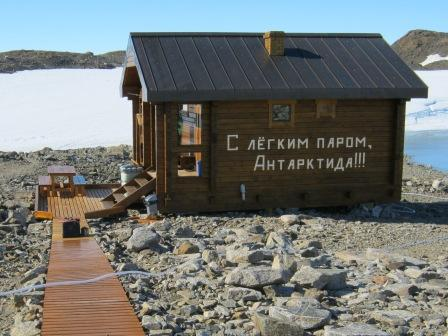
Russian Bath in Antarctica

The Russian bath (banya) of Novolazarevskaya Station, Schirmacher Oasis, Queen Maud Land (70°46′S 11°52′E) is the only glued timber building in Antarctica. It is the southernmost wooden sauna in the world.

== Design and construction ==
The idea for the bathhouse was born in 2006 and it became the first building of its kind in Antarctica. Glued timber was chosen as the material because of its thermal stability and energy efficiency.

The project was developed in the summer of 2006; it was produced and test-built at Greenside's factory in Saint Petersburg, Russia. All engineering systems were first made on a special test model between December 2006 and March 2007 in Greenside's Saint Petersburg factory.

Glued timber parts were shipped to Antarctica by the icebreaker Akademik Fyodorov in November 2006.

In November 2007, an Antarctic team of Greenside specialists made a trip to the South Pole to supervise the assembly. This building now stands on Novolazarevskaya station and took 43 days to complete.

== Grand opening ==
The official opening took place on 20 December 2007. Since then, the Greenside Russian bath has attracted visitors, including government ministers of the Russian Federation, State Duma deputies, members of Russian and foreign polar stations in Antarctica, scientists and members of royal families.
