= Lealand Bluff =

Cliff in Antarctica

Coordinates: 67°27′S 59°33′E

Lealand Bluff is a high rounded bluff in Stillwell Hills at the southwest corner of William Scoresby Bay in the eastern part of Enderby Land. Named by Discovery Investigations personnel on the RSS William Scoresby who charted this area in 1936.
