= Cape Murmanskiy =

Ice cape in Queen Maud Land, Antarctica

Cape Murmanskiy (69°40′S 13°20′E) is an ice cape that projects from the west side of Lazarev Ice Shelf, about 25 nautical miles (46 km) north-northeast of Leningradskiy Island, in Queen Maud Land. Mapped by the Soviet Antarctic Expedition in 1959 and named by them for the city of Murmansk.
