= Appendectomy =

Surgical removal of the vermiform appendix

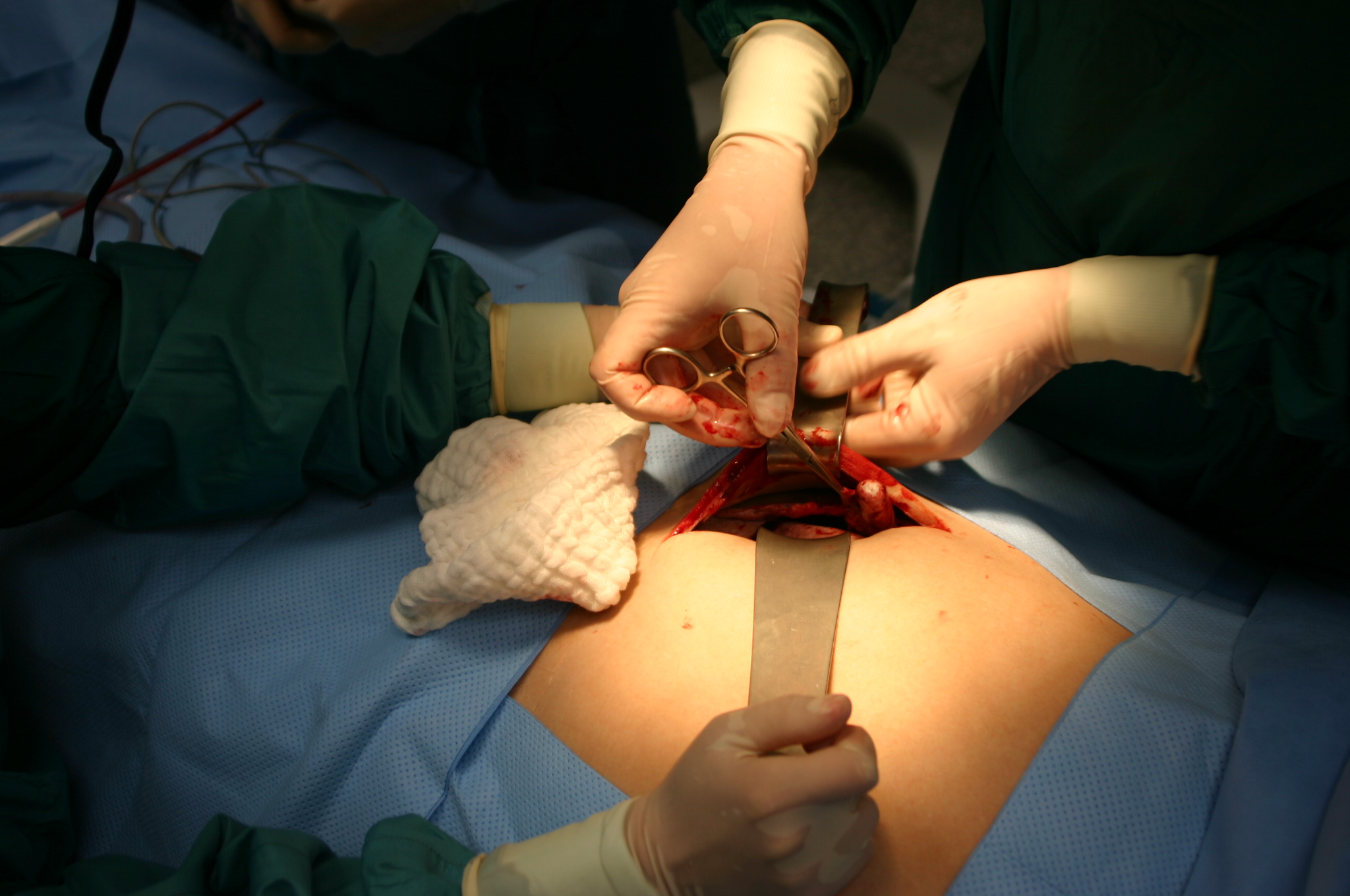
- An appendectomy in progress
- Other names: Appendisectomy, appendicectomy
- Specialty: General surgery
- Uses: Appendicitis
- Complications: Infection, bleeding
- Approach: Laparoscopic, open
- Recovery time: 1–3 weeks
- Frequency: Common

An appendectomy (American English) or appendicectomy (British English) is a surgical operation in which the vermiform appendix (a portion of the intestine) is removed. Appendectomy is normally performed as an urgent or emergency procedure to treat complicated acute appendicitis.

Appendectomy may be performed laparoscopically (as minimally invasive surgery) or as an open operation. Over the 2010s, surgical practice has increasingly moved towards routinely offering laparoscopic appendicectomy; for example, in the United Kingdom over 95% of adult appendicectomies are planned as laparoscopic procedures. Laparoscopy is often used if the diagnosis is in doubt, or to leave a less visible surgical scar. Recovery may be slightly faster after laparoscopic surgery, although the laparoscopic procedure itself is more expensive and resource-intensive than open surgery and generally takes longer. Advanced pelvic sepsis occasionally requires a lower midline laparotomy.

Complicated (perforated) appendicitis should undergo prompt surgical intervention. There has been significant recent trial evidence that uncomplicated appendicitis can be treated with either antibiotics or appendicectomy, with 51% of those treated with antibiotics avoiding an appendectomy after 3 years. After appendicectomy, the main difference in treatment is the length of time the antibiotics are administered. For uncomplicated appendicitis, antibiotics should be continued up to 24 hours postoperatively. For complicated appendicitis, antibiotics should be continued for anywhere between 3 and 7 days. An interval appendectomy is generally performed 6–8 weeks after conservative management with antibiotics for special cases, such as perforated appendicitis. Delay of appendectomy 24 hours after admission for symptoms of appendicitis has not been shown to increase the risk of perforation or other complications.

== Procedure ==
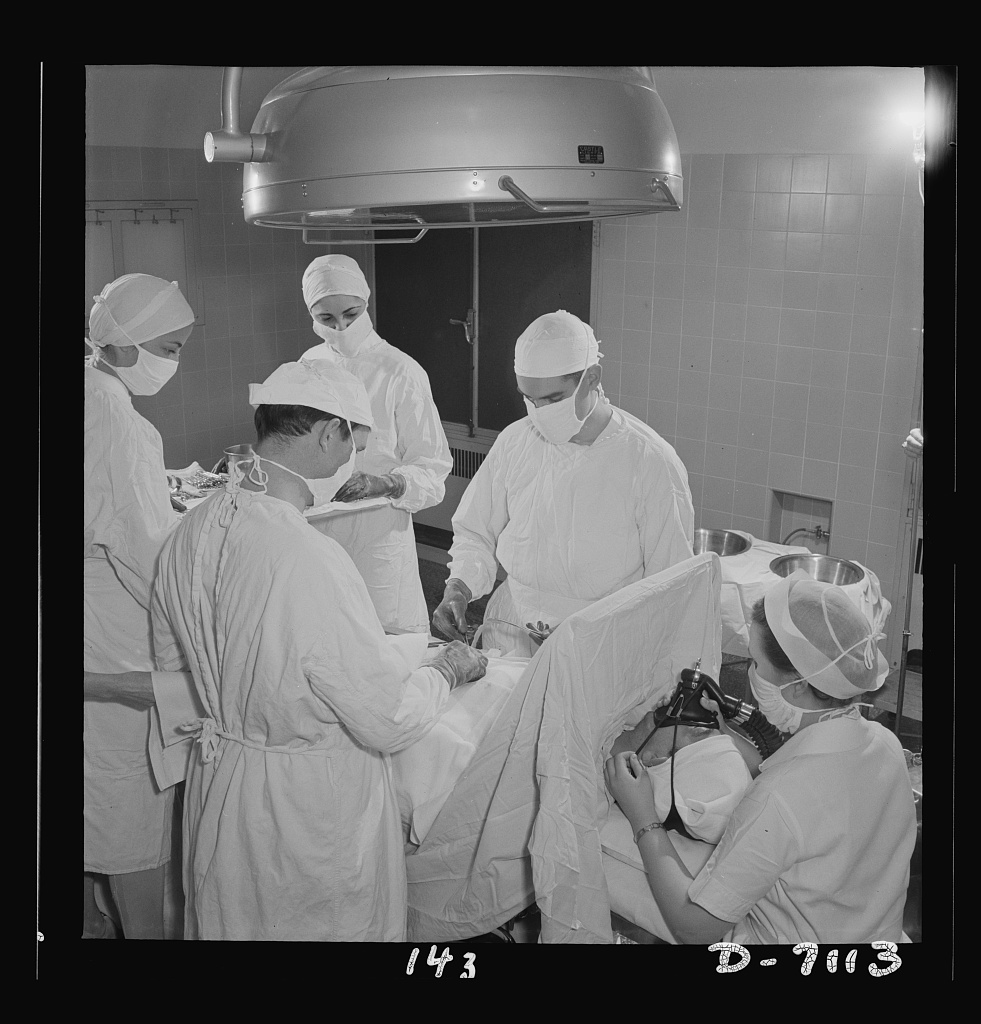
Nurses assist at an appendectomy (1942).

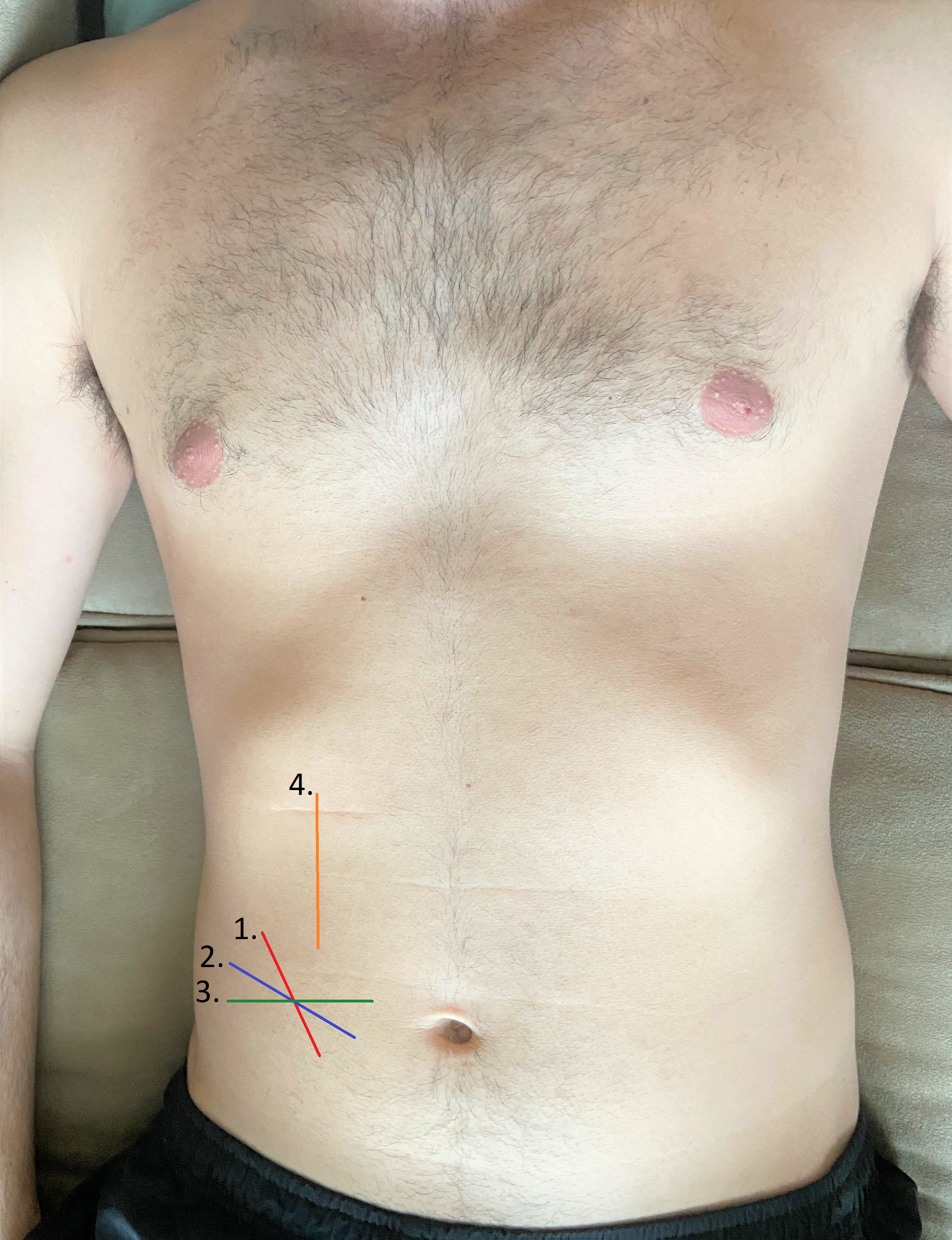
Four incisions for an appendectomy, corresponding to the order listed

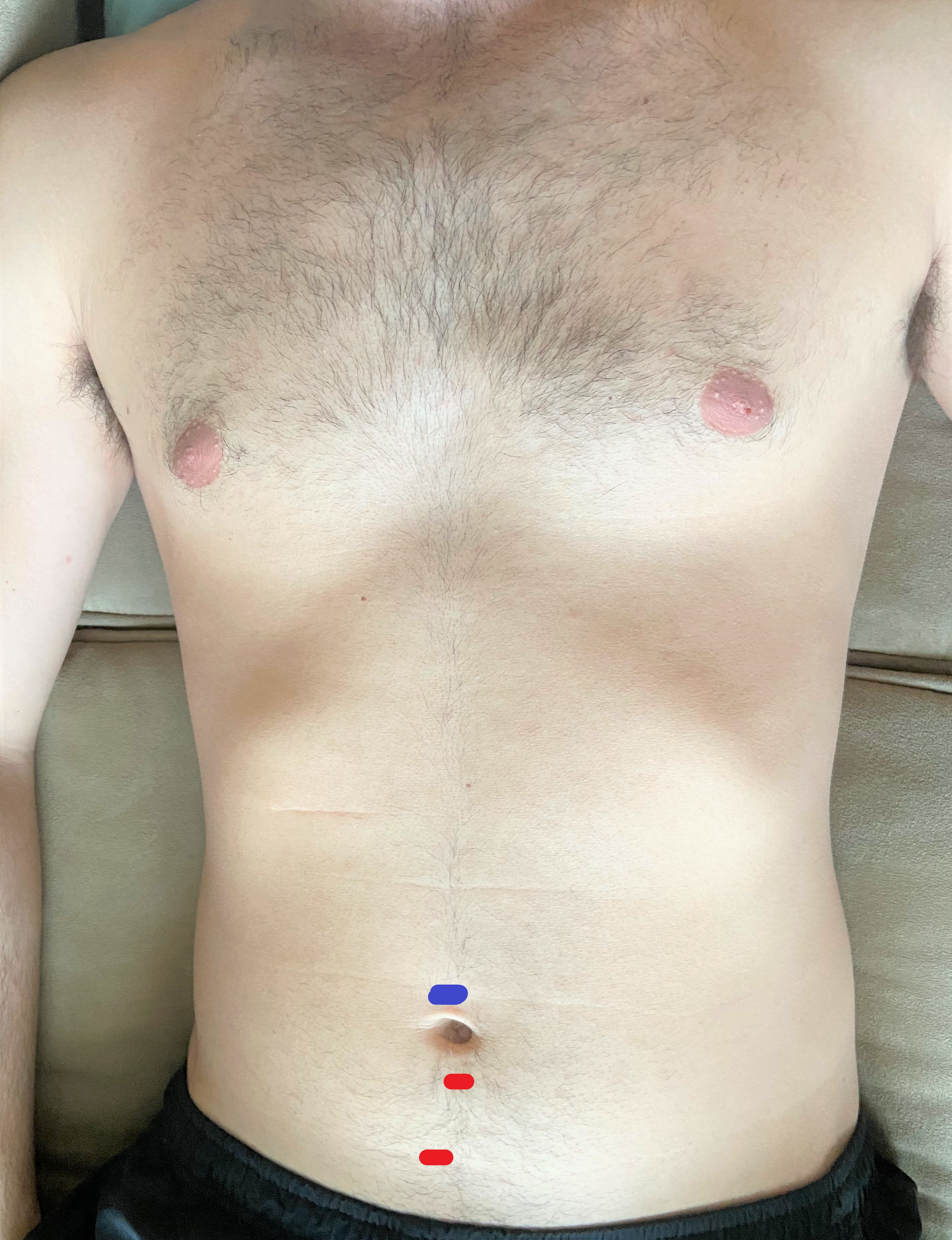
Hasson Entry: The two red lines mark the sites of the 5 mm laparoscopic ports. The blue line above the umbilicus marks the site of the camera port

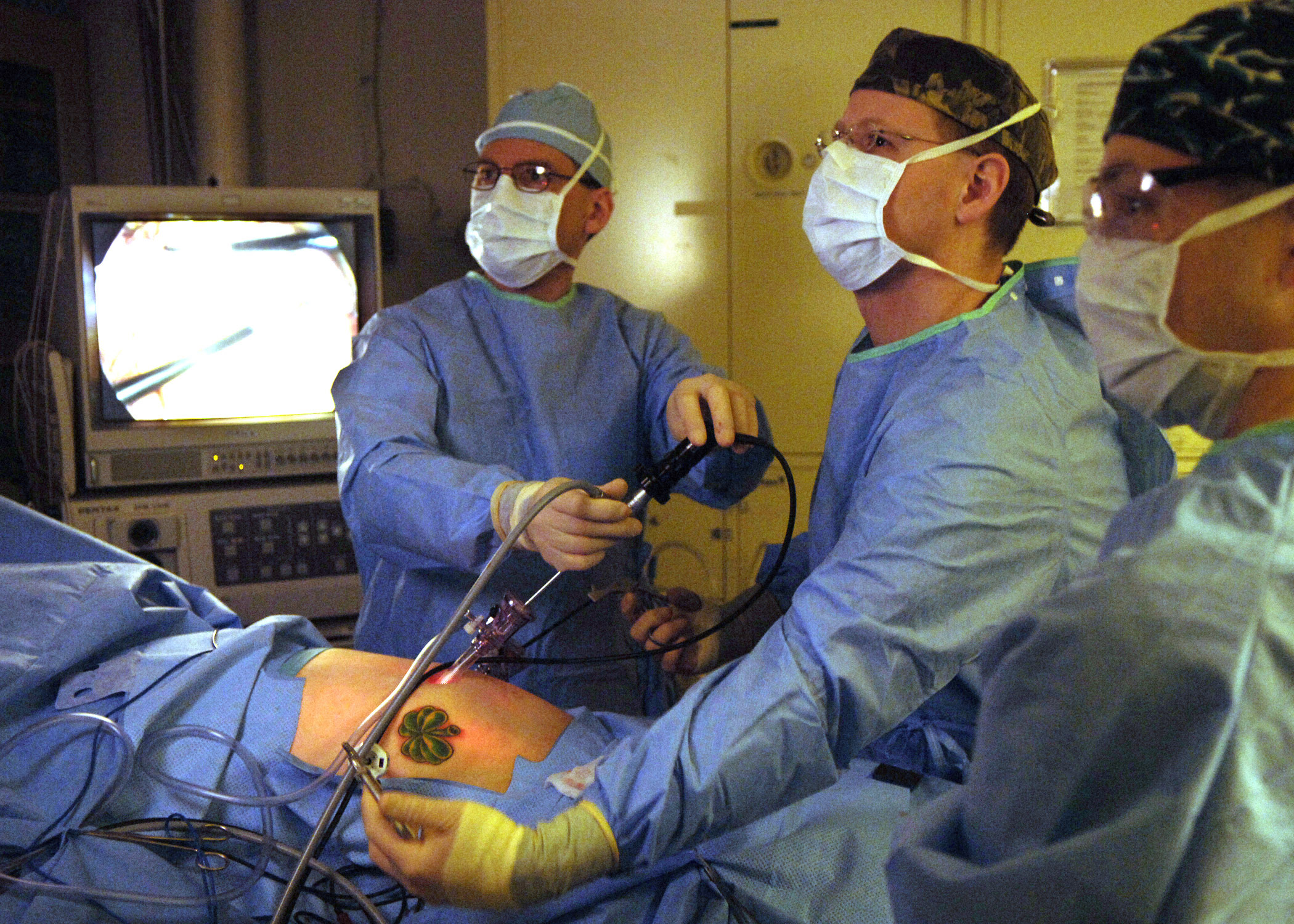
Surgeons perform a laparoscopic appendectomy.

Close up shot of an Appendix surgery, or appendectomy at a Hospital in Assam, India

In general terms, the procedure for an open appendectomy is:

1. Antibiotics are given immediately if signs of actual sepsis are seen (in appendicitis, sepsis and bacteremia usually only occurs at some point after rupture, once peritonitis has begun), or if there is reasonable suspicion that the appendix has ruptured (e.g., on imaging) or if the onset of peritonitis – which will lead to full sepsis if not quickly treated – is suspected; otherwise, a single dose of prophylactic intravenous antibiotics is given immediately before surgery.
2. General anaesthesia is induced, with endotracheal intubation and full muscle relaxation, and the patient is positioned supine.
3. The abdomen is prepared and draped and is examined under anesthesia.
4. If a mass is present, the incision is made over the mass. Otherwise, the incision is made over McBurney's point (one-third of the way from the anterior superior iliac spine to the umbilicus), which represents the most common position of the base of the appendix.
5. The various layers of the abdominal wall are opened. To preserve the integrity of the abdominal wall, the external oblique aponeurosis is split along the line of its fibers, as is the internal oblique muscle. As the two run at right angles to each other, this reduces the risk of later incisional hernia.
6. On entering the peritoneum, the appendix is identified, mobilized, and then ligated and divided at its base.
7. Some surgeons choose to bury the stump of the appendix by inverting it so it points into the caecum.
8. Each layer of the abdominal wall is then closed in turn.
9. The skin may be closed with staples or stitches.
10. The wound is dressed.
11. The patient is brought to the recovery room.

=== Incisions ===
The standardization of an incision is not the best practice when performing an appendectomy, given that the appendix is a mobile organ. A physical exam should be performed before the operation, and the incision should be chosen based on the point of maximal tenderness to palpation.

These incisions are placed for an appendectomy:

1. McBurney's incision, also known as gridiron incision
2. Lanz incision
3. Rutherford Morison incision
4. Paramedian incision

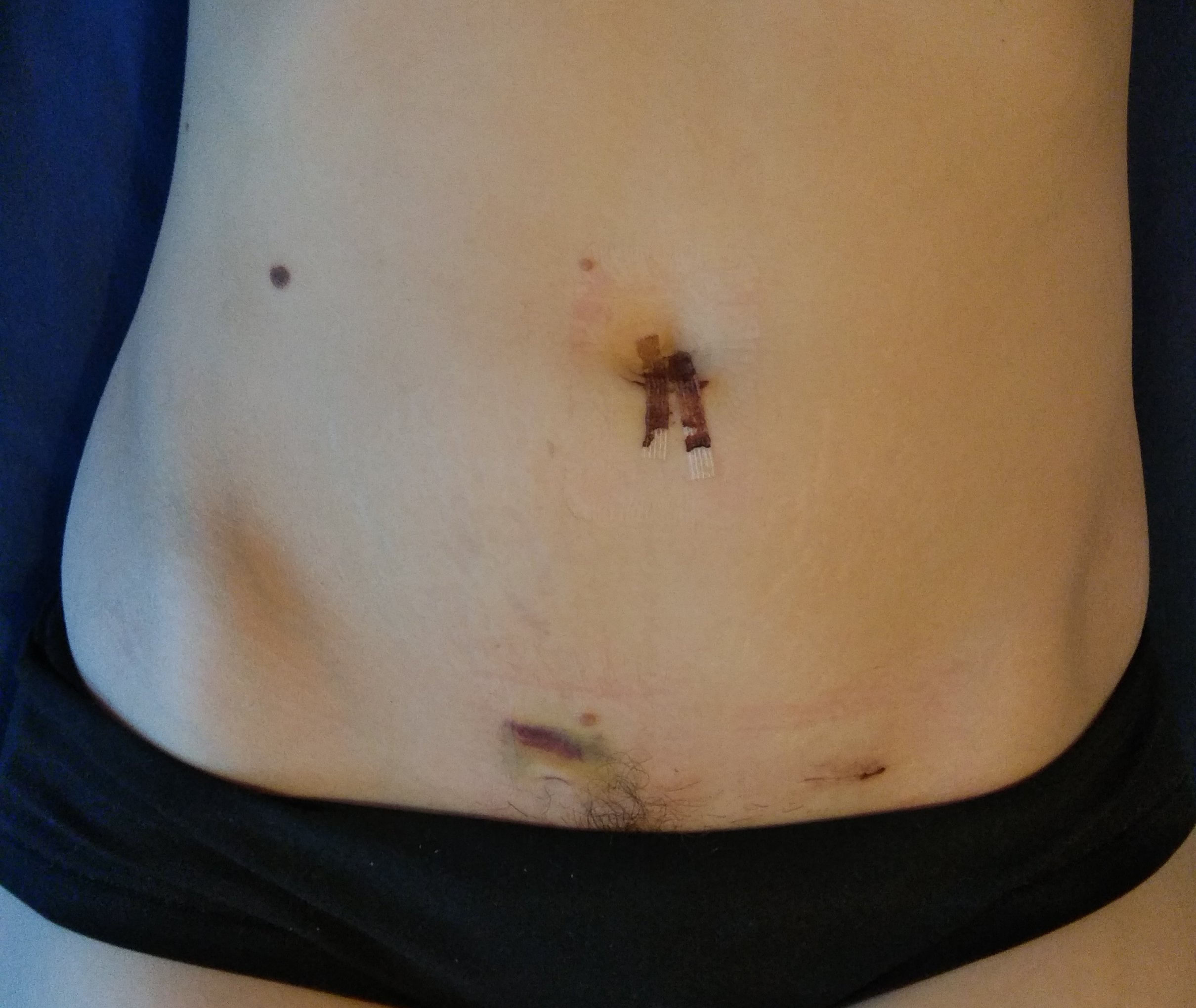
Wound healing - ten days after a laparoscopic appendectomy

Over the past decade, the outcomes of laparoscopic appendectomies have compared favorably to those for open appendectomies because of decreased pain, fewer postoperative complications, shorter hospitalization, earlier mobilization, earlier return to work, and better cosmesis; however, despite these advantages, efforts are still being made to decrease abdominal incision and visible scars after laparoscopy. Recent research has led to the development of natural orifice transluminal endoscopic surgery (NOTES); however, numerous difficulties need to be overcome before a wider clinical application of NOTES is adopted, including complications such as the opening of hollow viscera, failed sutures, a lack of fully developed instrumentation, and the necessity of reliable cost-benefit analyses.

Many surgeons have attempted to reduce incisional morbidity and improve cosmetic outcomes in laparoscopic appendectomy by using fewer and smaller ports. Kollmar et al. described moving laparoscopic incisions to hide them in the natural camouflages, like the suprapubic hairline, to improve cosmesis. Additionally, reports in the literature indicate that minilaparoscopic appendectomy using 2- or 3-mm or even smaller instruments along with one 12-mm port minimizes pain and improves cosmesis. More recently, studies by Ates et al. and Roberts et al. have described variants of an intracorporeal sling-based single-port laparoscopic appendectomy with good clinical results.

Also, a trend is increasing towards single-incision laparoscopic surgery (SILS), using a special multiport umbilical trocar. With SILS, a more conventional view of the field of surgery is seen compared to NOTES. The equipment used for SILS is familiar to surgeons already doing laparoscopic surgery. Most importantly, it is easy to convert SILS to conventional laparoscopy by adding a few trocars; this conversion to conventional laparoscopy is called 'port rescue'. SILS is feasible, reasonably safe, and cosmetically advantageous, compared to standard laparoscopy; however, this newer technique involves specialized instruments and is more difficult to learn because of a loss of triangulation, clashing of instruments, crossing of instruments (cross triangulation), and a lack of maneuverability. The additional problem of decreased exposure and the added financial burden of procuring special articulating or curved coaxial instruments exist. SILS is still evolving, being used successfully in many centres, but with some way to go before it becomes mainstream. This limits its widespread use, especially in rural or peripheral centres with limited resources.

== Pediatric patients ==
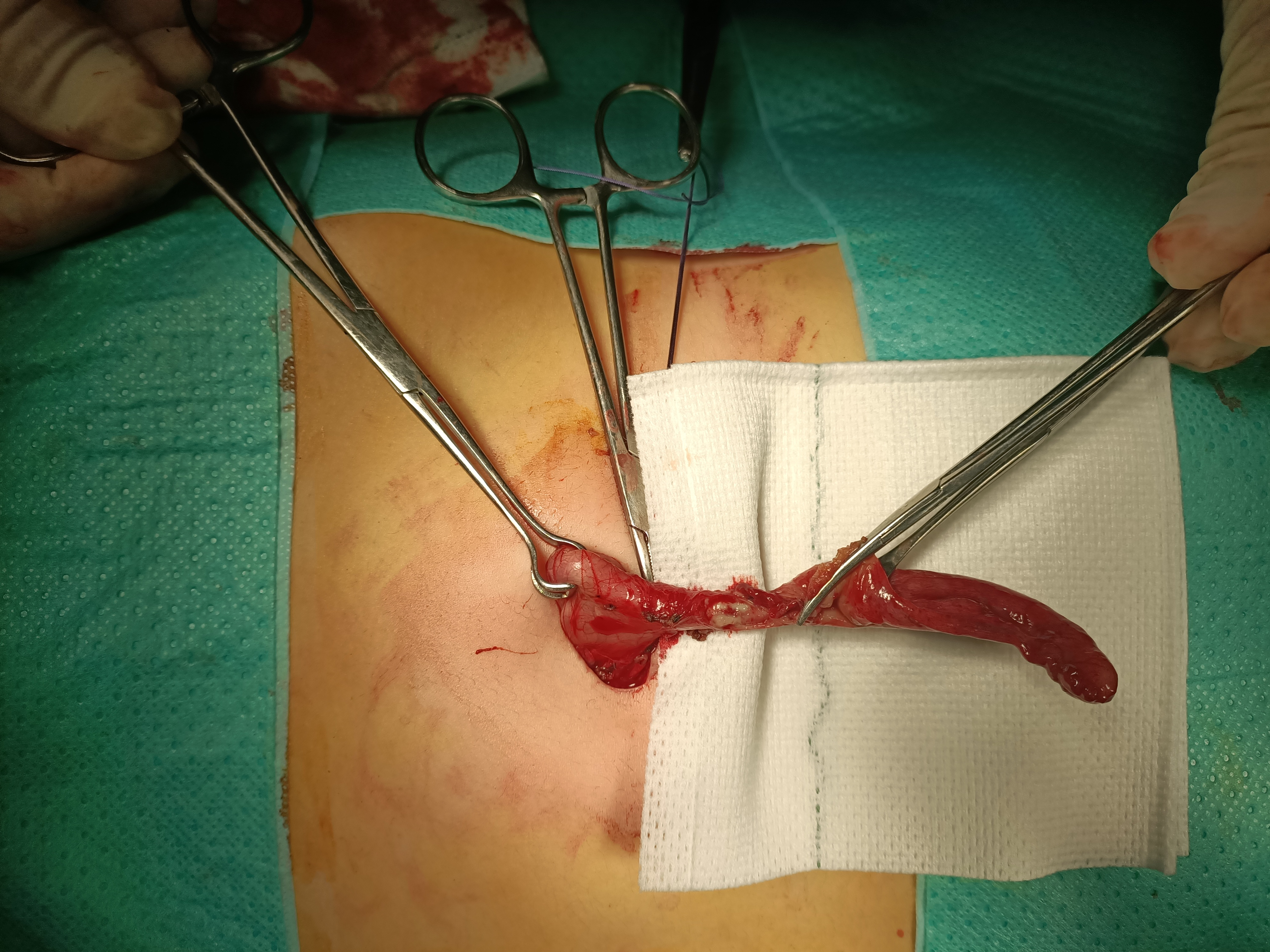
Inflamed appendix removal

Pediatric patients have a mobile cecum, which allows externalization of the cecal appendix through the umbilicus in most cases. This has led to the development of surgical techniques such as laparoscopic-assisted transumbilical appendectomy, which allows the entire surgery to be performed with a single umbilical incision and has significant advantages in terms of both recovery and aesthetic outcome.

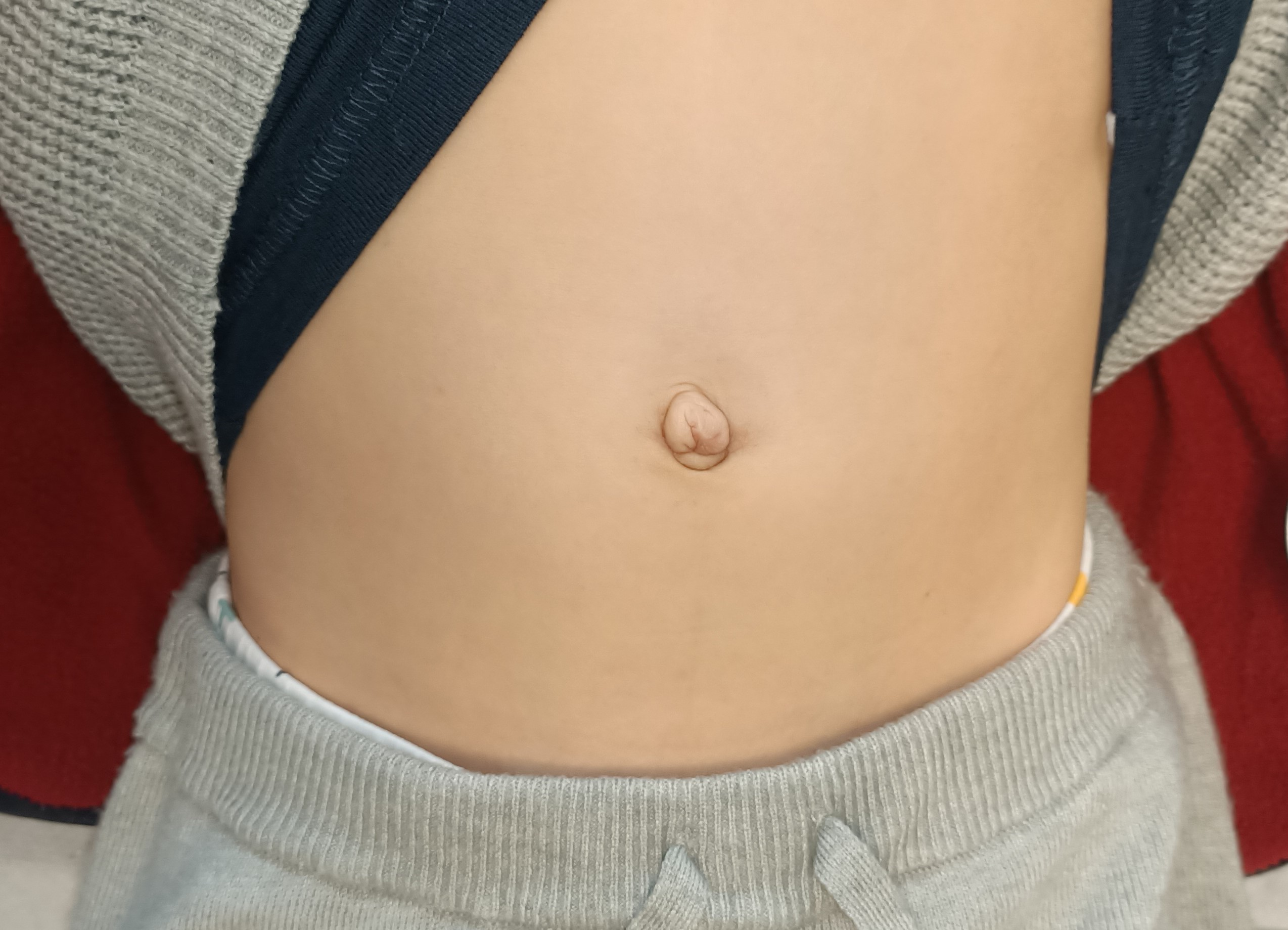
Laparoscopic-assisted transumbilical appendectomy scar on a pediatric patient. Anesthetic result one month after surgery.

== Pregnancy ==
Appendicitis is the most common emergent general surgery-related problem to arise during pregnancy. There is a natural elevation in white blood cell count in addition to anatomical changes of the appendix that occur during pregnancy. These findings, in addition to non-specific abdominal symptoms, make appendicitis difficult to diagnose. Appendicitis develops most commonly in the second trimester. If appendicitis develops in a pregnant woman, an appendectomy is usually performed and should not harm the fetus. The risk of premature delivery is about 10%. The risk of fetal death in the perioperative period after an appendectomy for early acute appendicitis is 3 to 5%. The risk of fetal death is 20% in perforated appendicitis.

There has been debate regarding which surgical approach is preferred during pregnancy. Overall, there is no increased risk of fetal loss or preterm delivery with the laparoscopic approach (LA) as compared to the open approach (OA). However, the LA was associated with shorter length of stay in the hospital as well as reduced risk of wound infection.

Patient positioning is of utmost importance to ensure the safety of the fetus during the procedure. This is especially important during the third trimester due to the potential of compression of the inferior vena cava by the enlarged uterus. Placing the patient in a 30-degree left lateral decubitus position alleviates this pressure and prevents fetal distress.

One area of concern related to the LA during pregnancy is pneumoperitoneum. This causes an increase in the intra-abdominal pressure, leading to decreased venous return and, therefore, decreased cardiac output. The decreased cardiac output may lead to fetal acidosis and cause distress. However, an animal pregnancy model demonstrated that a 10–12 mmHg insufflation pressure demonstrated no adverse effects on the fetus. SAGES (Society of American Gastrointestinal and Endoscopic Surgeons) currently recommends an insufflation pressure of 10–15 mmHg during pregnancy.

== Recovery ==
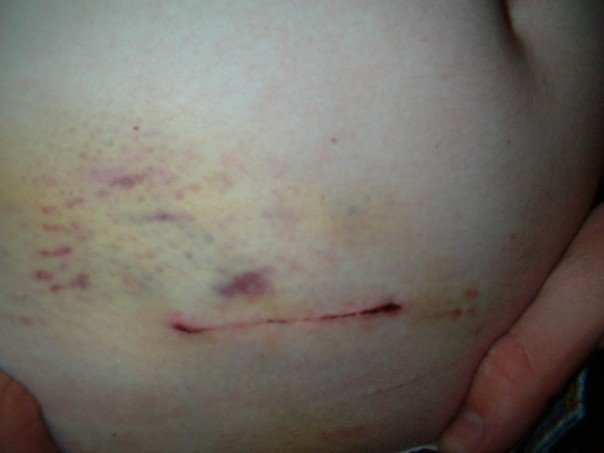
Scar and bruise 2 days after operation

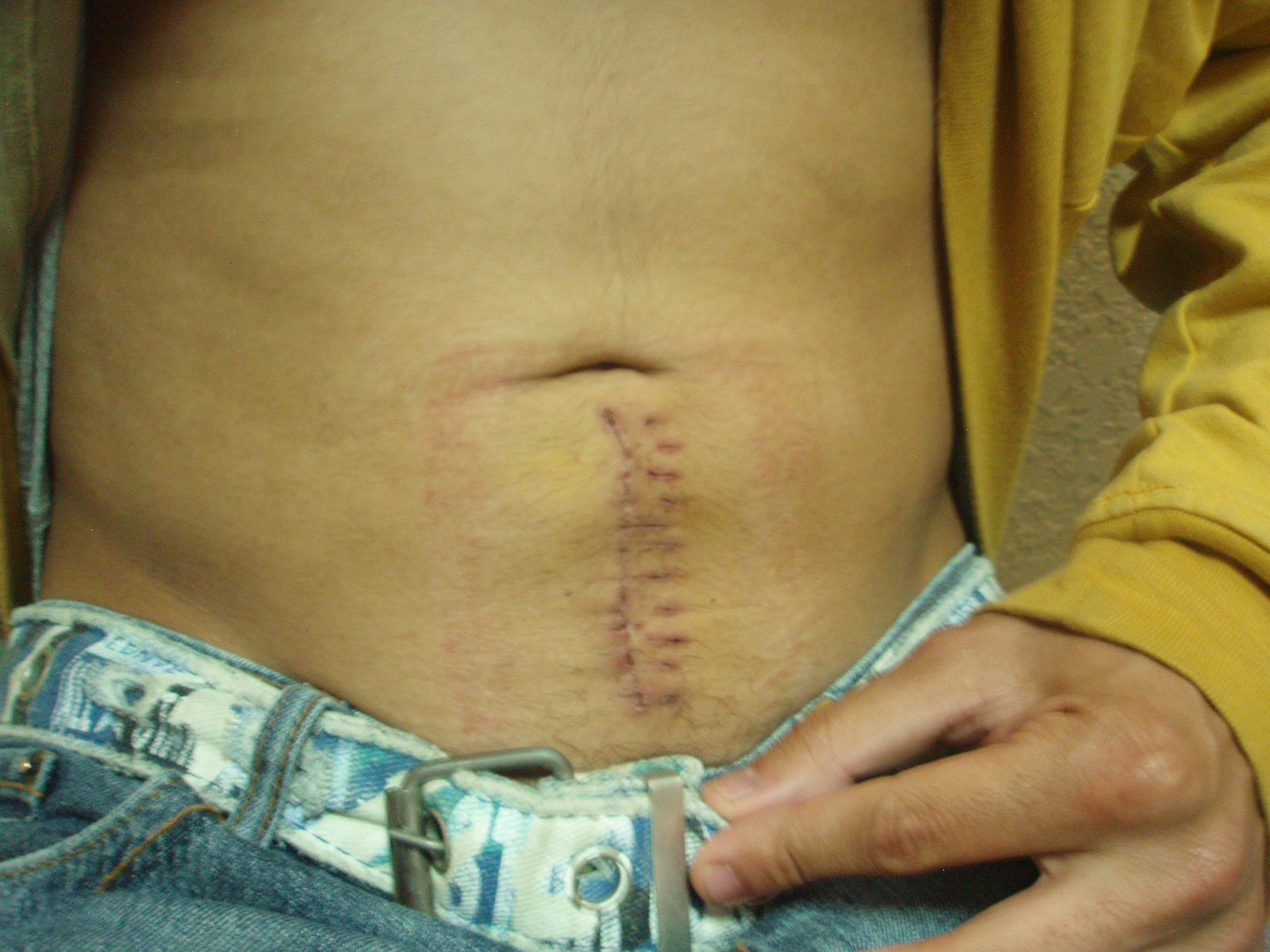
Scar 10 days after operation

A study from 2010 found that the average hospital stay for people with appendicitis in the United States was 1.8 days. For people with a perforated (ruptured) appendix, the average length of stay was 5.2 days.

Recovery time from the operation varies from person to person. Some take up to three weeks before being completely active; for others, it can be a matter of days. In the case of a laparoscopic operation, the patient has three stapled scars of about an inch (2.5 cm) in length, between the navel and pubic hair line. When an open appendectomy has been performed, the patient has a 2- to 3-inch (5–7.5 cm) scar, which will initially be heavily bruised.

== Complications ==
One of the most common post-operative complications associated with an appendectomy is the development of a surgical site infection (SSI). Signs and symptoms indicative of a superficial SSI are redness, swelling, and tenderness surrounding the incision and are most likely to arise on post-operative day 4 or 5. These symptoms oftentimes precede fluid drainage from the incision. Tenderness extending beyond the redness that surrounds the incision, in addition to the development of cutaneous vesicles or bullae may be indicative of a deep SSI.

Patients with complicated appendicitis (perforated appendicitis) are more likely to develop an SSI, abdominal abscess, or pelvic abscess during the post-operative period. Placement of an abdominal drain was originally thought to reduce the risk of these post-operative complications. However, abdominal drains have not been found to play a significant role in reducing SSIs and have led to increased length of stay in the hospital, in addition to increased cost of the operation.

== Frequency ==
Approximately 327,000 appendectomies were performed during U.S. hospital stays in 2011, a rate of 10.5 procedures per 10,000 population. Appendectomies accounted for 2.1% of all operating-room procedures in 2011.

== History ==
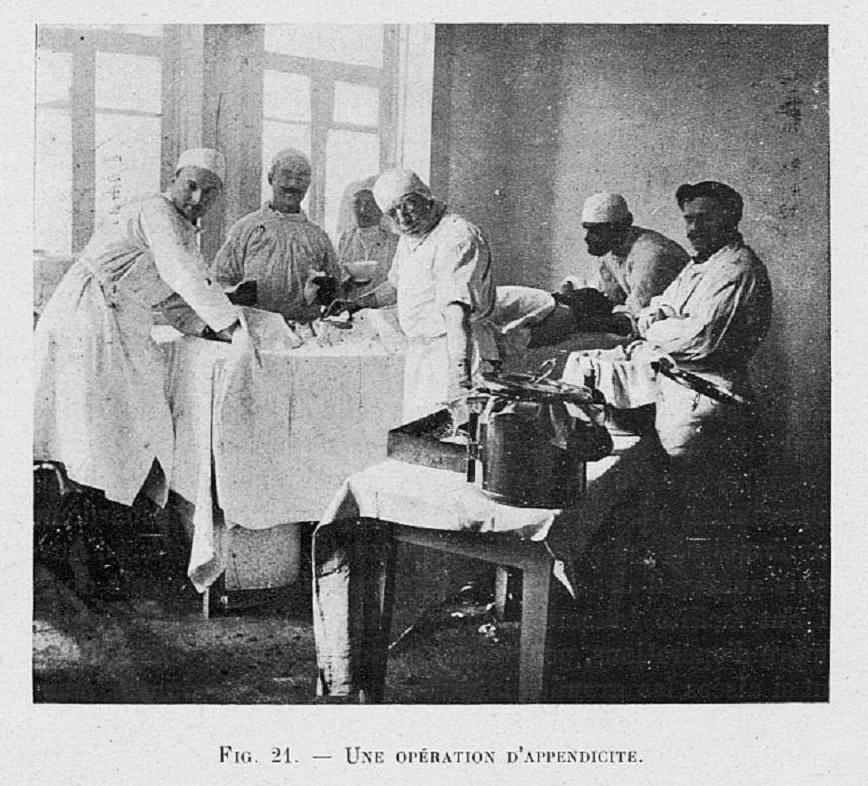
An appendectomy at the French Hospital in Tbilisi, Georgia, 1919

The first recorded successful appendectomy was performed in September 1731 by English surgeon William Cookesley on Abraham Pike, a chimney sweep. The second was on December 6, 1735, at St. George's Hospital in London, when French surgeon Claudius Amyand described the presence of a perforated appendix within the inguinal hernial sac of an 11-year-old boy. The organ had apparently been perforated by a pin the boy had swallowed. The patient, Hanvil Andersen, made a recovery and was discharged a month later.

Harry Hancock performed the first abdominal surgery for appendicitis in 1848, but he did not remove the appendix. In 1889, in New York City, Charles McBurney described the presentation and pathogenesis of appendicitis accurately and developed the teaching that an early appendectomy was the best treatment to avoid perforation and peritonitis.

Some cases of autoappendectomies have occurred. One was attempted by Evan O'Neill Kane in 1921, but the operation was completed by his assistants. Another was Leonid Rogozov, who in 1961 had to operate on himself as he was the only doctor on a remote Antarctic base.

On September 13, 1980, Kurt Semm performed the first laparoscopic appendectomy, opening up the path for a much wider application of minimally invasive surgery.

== Cost ==
=== United States ===
While appendectomy is a standard surgical procedure, its cost has been found to vary considerably in the United States. A 2012 study analyzed 2009 data from nearly 20,000 adult patients treated for appendicitis in California hospitals. Researchers examined "only uncomplicated episodes of acute appendicitis" that involved "visits for patients 18 to 59 years old with hospitalization that lasted fewer than four days with routine discharges to home." The lowest charge for removal of an appendix was $1,529 and the highest $182,955, almost 120 times greater. The median charge was $33,611. While the study was limited to California, the researchers indicated that the results were applicable anywhere in the United States. Many, but not all, patients are covered by some form of medical insurance.

A study by the Agency for Healthcare Research and Quality found that in 2010, the average cost for a stay in the United States involving appendicitis was $7,800. For stays where the appendix had ruptured, the average cost was $12,800. The majority of patients seen in the hospital were covered by private insurance.

== See also ==
- List of surgeries by type
- Evan O'Neill Kane
- Leonid Rogozov
