= Leonid Rogozov =

Russian doctor who performed an auto-appendectomy (1934–2000)

Leonid Ivanovich Rogozov
- Леони́д Ива́нович Ро́гозов
- Born: 14 March 1934; Dauriya, Borzinsky District, Chita Oblast, Russian SFSR, Soviet Union
- Died: 21 September 2000 (aged 66); Saint Petersburg, Russia
- Education: Saint Petersburg State Pediatric Medical University (MD)
- Occupations: General practitioner; surgeon
- Known for: Performing an auto-appendectomy while deployed at Novolazarevskaya Station in Antarctica from 1960 to 1962
- Notable work: Resection of the Esophagus for Treating Esophageal Cancer (1966)
- Honours: Order of the Red Banner of Labour (1961)

Leonid Ivanovich Rogozov (Russian: Леони́д Ива́нович Ро́гозов; 14 March 1934 – 21 September 2000) was a Russian general practitioner and surgeon who took part in the Sixth Soviet Antarctic Expedition at Novolazarevskaya Station from September 1960 to October 1962. He is best known for performing a surgery to remove his own appendix—an auto-appendectomy—after he began suffering from appendicitis while deployed there in April 1961. The incident, which occurred because Rogozov was the only medical professional among his entire team, prompted the Soviet government to reform the safety policies for all personnel at the country's Antarctic research facilities.

== Early life and education ==
Leonid Rogozov was born in Dauriya, Borzinsky District, Chita Oblast, a remote village in eastern Siberia, a little over 16 km (10 mi) from the Soviet border with Mongolia and China, near Manzhouli. His father was killed in World War II in 1943. In 1953, Rogozov completed his studies at a secondary school in Minusinsk, Krasnoyarsk Krai, and was admitted to the Leningrad Pediatric Medical Institute (now Saint Petersburg State Pediatric Medical University). After graduating in 1959 as a general practitioner, he started clinical training to specialise in surgery. In September 1960, at the age of 26, he interrupted his training and joined the sixth Soviet Antarctic Expedition as a medical doctor.

== Antarctic deployment ==
From September 1960 until October 1962, Rogozov worked in Antarctica, in his role as the sole doctor for a team of thirteen researchers at the Novolazarevskaya Station, established in January 1961.

On the morning of 29 April 1961, Rogozov experienced general weakness, nausea, and moderate fever, and later pain in the lower right portion of his abdomen. None of the possible conservative treatments helped. By 30 April signs of localised peritonitis became apparent, and his condition worsened considerably by the evening. Mirny, the nearest Soviet research station, was more than 1,600 km (1,000 mi) from Novolazarevskaya. Antarctic research stations of other countries did not have an aircraft available. Severe blizzard conditions prevented aircraft landing in any case. Rogozov had no option but to perform an operation on himself.

The operation started at 02:00 local time on 1 May with the help of a driver and meteorologist, who provided instruments and held a mirror so Rogozov could observe areas not directly visible. Rogozov lay in a semi-reclining position, half-turned to his left side. A solution of 0.5% novocaine was used for local anaesthesia of the abdominal wall. Rogozov made a 10–12 cm incision of the abdominal wall, but while opening the peritoneum he accidentally cut the cecum and had to suture it. Then he exposed the appendix. According to his report, the appendix was found to have a dark stain at its base, and Rogozov estimated it would have burst within a day. The appendix was resected and antibiotics were applied directly into the peritoneal cavity. He developed general weakness and nausea about 30–40 minutes after the start of the operation, and took repeated short pauses for rest. By about 04:00 the operation was complete.

After the operation, gradual improvement occurred in the signs of peritonitis and in Rogozov's general condition. His body temperature returned to normal after five days, and the stitches were removed seven days after the operation. He resumed his regular duties in about two weeks.

The self-surgery, which was photographed by his colleagues, captured the imagination of the Soviet public at the time. In 1961 he was awarded the Order of the Red Banner of Labour. The incident resulted in a change of policy, and thereafter, extensive health checks were mandatory for personnel to be deployed on such expeditions.

== Later life and death ==
In October 1962, Rogozov returned to Saint Petersburg and started working on an MD at his alma mater. In September 1966 he published a dissertation titled Resection of the Esophagus for Treating Esophageal Cancer. He later worked as a doctor in various hospitals in Saint Petersburg. From 1986 to 2000, he served as the head of the surgery department of Saint Petersburg Research Institute for Tubercular Pulmonology.

Rogozov died in 2000, aged 66, in Saint Petersburg, Russia, from lung cancer.

== See also ==
- Jerri Nielsen, an American physician who performed a biopsy and self-treated her own breast cancer in 1999 while overwintering in Antarctica.
- Evan O'Neill Kane, an American physician who removed his own appendix to better understand the procedure from the patient's perspective in 1921.
