= Verblyud Island =

Island in Antarctica

- Location within Antarctica

Geography
- Location: Antarctica
- Coordinates: 70°0′S 15°55′E
- Highest elevation: 200 m (700 ft)

Administration
- Administered under the Antarctic Treaty System

Demographics
- Population: Uninhabited

Verblyud Island is an ice-covered island whose summit rises 200 m above the surrounding ice shelf, situated at the east margin of Lazarev Ice Shelf along the coast of Queen Maud Land. First mapped by the Soviet Antarctic Expedition (SovAE) in 1961 and named Kupol Verblyud (купол Верблюд - camel dome).

== See also ==
- List of antarctic and sub-Antarctic islands
