= Riiser-Larsen Sea =

Marginal sea in the Southern Ocean off East Antarctica

Coordinates: 68°00′S 22°00′E

The proposed Riiser-Larsen Sea name as part of the Southern Ocean

The Riiser-Larsen Sea is one of the marginal seas located in the Southern Ocean off East Antarctica and south of the Indian Ocean. It is delimited Astrid Ridge in the west and the Gunnerus Ridge and the Kainanmaru Bank in the east. It is bordered by the Lazarev Sea to the west and the Cosmonauts Sea to the east, or between 14°E and 30°E. Its northern border is defined to be the 65th parallel south. The name, proposed by the Soviet Union, was never officially approved by the International Hydrographic Organization (IHO).

To the south of this area lies the Princess Astrid Coast and Princess Ragnhild Coast of Queen Maud Land. In the western part is the Lazarev Ice Shelf, and further east are Erskine Iceport and Godel Iceport, and the former Belgian Roi-Baudouin Station.

== Name dispute ==
The Riiser-Larsen Sea was named in 1962 by the Soviet Antarctic Expedition in honor of Norwegian aviation pioneer and polar explorer Hjalmar Riiser-Larsen (1890–1965). The IHO 2002 draft was never approved by the IHO (or any other organization), and the 1953 IHO document (which does not contain the name) remains currently in force. Leading geographic authorities and atlases do not use the name, including the 2014 10th edition World Atlas from the United States' National Geographic Society and the 2014 12th edition of the British Times Atlas of the World. But Soviet and Russian-issued maps do.

== Bathymetry ==
Depths exceed 3,000 meters in most of the waters here. The area is covered with drifting ice almost year-round. It would stretch over an area of 1,138,000 km². The seafloor of the Riiser-Larsen Sea is relatively flat.

The bedrock in the Riiser-Larsen Sea is one of the oldest around Antarctica (145 Ma) and erosion over this long timespan has produced the largest submarine canyons of the continent. The two dozens canyons in the Riiser-Larsen Sea can be divided into two groups: surface canyons and buried canyons. The buried canyons are twice the size and much older (4–7 Ma) than the surface canyons (younger than 2.4 Ma). The continental shelf of the Riiser-Larsen Sea is relatively narrow and forms rugged terraces at a depth of 750 m (2,460 ft), probably the maximum extent of seafloor-reaching icebergs. The buried canyons formed during a period of maximum glaciation when grounded icebergs reached the shelf edge which resulted in a peak in sediment transport. As the ice sheet had retreated sediments got trapped on the shelf and the sediment supply to the canyons was cut off.

The Riiser-Larsen Sea was one of the first Antarctic marginal basins to be affected by the expanding ice sheet at c. 34 Ma. The oldest, pre-glacial deposit sequence consists of turbidites and hemipelagic sediments. The expanding ice sheet initially triggered slumps and flows of debris that were deposited on the upper continental rise. Because of progradation later deposits ended up on the lower rise and the abyssal plain. Then large channel-levee complexes developed on the upper rise resulting in an unconformity associated with the Middle Miocene intensification of the Antarctic Circumpolar Current.

== Opening of Riiser-Larsen Sea ==
The break-up of Gondwana began in the Early Jurassic between West Antarctica, Africa, and Madagascar following the Karoo eruption (185 to 180 Ma) centered on southern Africa. Rifting then spread towards Antarctica and seafloor spreading opened what is now the Mozambique Basin, Riiser-Larsen Sea, West Somali Basin, and Weddell Sea during the Late Jurassic. The oldest identified magnetic anomalies (M25–M24) are 154–152 Ma old, but the break-up coincides with the Jurassic Quiet Zone and the oldest anomaly probably is M40 (166 Ma). As Madagascar had been transferred to the African Plate at M10 (130–120 Ma) spreading began between Madagascar and Antarctica — the birth of the Southwest Indian Ridge that still separates the Mozambique Basin from the Riiser-Larsen Sea.
