= Zub (surname) =

Zub is a surname meaning "tooth" in many Slavic languages. Notable people with the surname include:

- Alexandru Zub (born 1934), Romanian historian
- Artem Zub (born 1995), Russian ice hockey player
- Jim Zub, Canadian comic book writer, artist, and art instructor
- Marek Zub (born 1964), Polish football player and football manager
- Mieczysław Zub (1953–1985), Polish serial killer
- Ryszard Zub (1934–2015), Polish fencer

== See also ==
- Zubov (surname)
