= Tsentral'naya Hill =

Tsentral'naya Hill (70°45′S 11°40′E; Russian: Гора Централная, romanized: Gora Tsentralnaya) is a bare rock hill (205 m) in the central part of the Schirmacher Hills, Queen Maud Land. The feature was mapped by the Soviet Antarctic Expedition in 1961 and named Gora Tsentral'naya (central hill).
