= Nadezhdy Island =

Island in Antarctica

- Location within Antarctica

Geography
- Location: Antarctica
- Coordinates: 70°44′S 11°40′E
- Length: 2 km (1.2 mi)

Administration
- Administered under the Antarctic Treaty System

Demographics
- Population: Uninhabited

Nadezhdy Island is a bare rock island nearly 1.9 kilometres (1 nmi) long, lying just off the north-central side of Schirmacher Hills, Queen Maud Land. First photographed from the air by the German Antarctic Expedition, 1938–39. Mapped by the Soviet Antarctic Expedition in 1961 and named Ostrov Nadezhdy (Hope Island).

== See also ==
- List of antarctic and sub-antarctic islands
