= Tyuleniy Point =

Tyuleniy Point (70°44′S 11°36′E) is a rock point 0.5 nautical miles (0.9 km) west of Ozhidaniya Cove on the north side of the Schirmacher Hills, Queen Maud Land. First photographed from the air by the German Antarctic Expedition, 1938–39. Mapped by the Soviet Antarctic Expedition in 1961 and named Mys Tyuleniy (seal point).
