= Schirmacher Oasis =

- Plateau
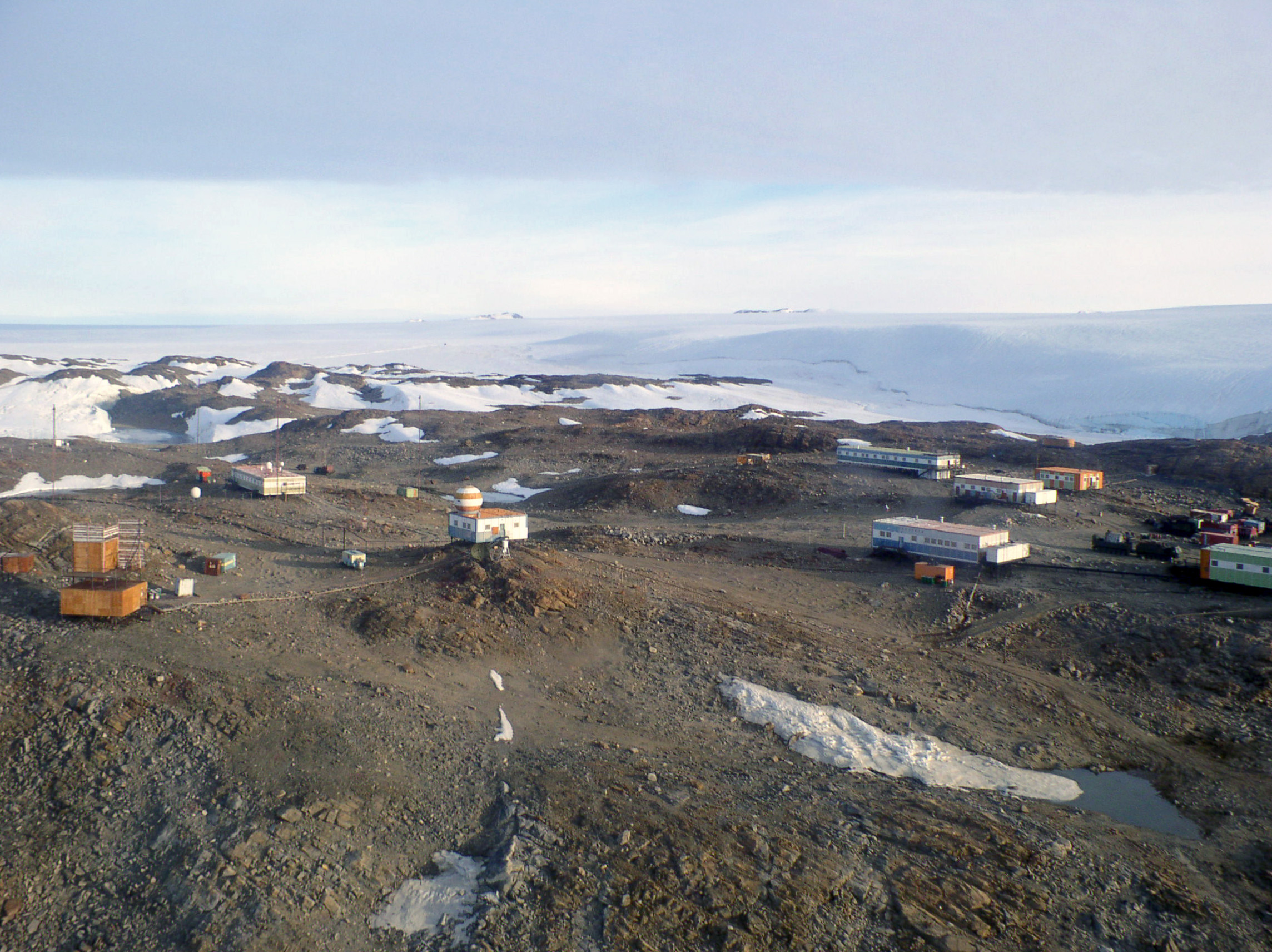
- Schirmacher Oasis, Princess Astrid Coast

- Location within Antarctica
- Coordinates: 70°45′30″S 11°38′40″E
- Location: Queen Maud Land
- Range: Schirmacher Hills
- Water bodies: Princess Astrid Coast

Area
  - Total: 34 km^{2} (13 mi^{2})
- Highest elevation: 228 (Mount Rebristaya)

The Schirmacher Oasis (or Schirmacher Lake Plateau) is a 25 km (16 mi) long and up to 3 km (1.9 mi) wide ice-free plateau with more than 100 freshwater lakes. It is situated in the Schirmacher Hills on the Princess Astrid Coast in Queen Maud Land in East Antarctica and is, on average, 100 m (330 ft) above sea level. With an area of 34 km^{2} (13 sq mi), the Schirmacher Oasis ranks among the smallest Antarctic oases and is a typical polar desert.

== Geography ==
The oasis is located between the edge of the Antarctic Ice Sheet and the Novolazarevskaya Nivl Ice Shelf. The approximately 100 m (330 ft) high plateau of the Schirmacher Oasis is a barrier to the northwards-running ice stream. On the northern edge of the oasis are so-called epishelf lakes, bays separated from the ocean which are connected with the ocean underneath the surface of the ice. Thus, tidal effects can be observed in the lakes. The epishelf lakes can contain either mere freshwater or saltwater which is overlaid by freshwater. The Antarctic Ice Sheet, southwards of the Schirmacher Oasis, reaches heights of 1,500 m (4,900 ft). The nunataks Skaly Instituta Geologii Arktiki (Skaly IGA) and Basisny-Kit protrude from the ice sheet. Between the offshore ice sheet and the Wegener Ice Sheet Plateau are the Wohlthat Mountains.

The highest part of the Schirmacher Oasis is Mount Rebristaya, with a height of 228 m (748 ft). At a depth of 34.5 m (113 ft), Lake Glubokoye is the deepest inland lake of the oasis. Spatially, the largest lake within the oasis is Lake Sub, with an area of 0.5 km^{2} (0.19 sq mi).

A number of theories exist about the formation of the oasis that include geothermal heating, intense insolation, or the hypothesis that the ice flow is blocked by a geological feature such as a mountain.

== Climate ==
The climate of the Schirmacher Oasis is relatively mild for Antarctic conditions. The annual average temperature is −10.4 °C (13.3 °F) (ranging from 0.9 °C (33.6 °F) in summer to −22.0 °C (−7.6 °F) in winter), the annual average wind speed is 9.7 m/s (22 mph; 18.9 kn), the annual average precipitation is 264.5 mm (10.41 in), and there are 350 hours of sunshine per month. Because of the positive radiation balance, the Schirmacher Oasis is regionally classified as a "coastal climate zone".

== Flora and fauna ==
The rocky soil at the Oasis allows growth only for a limited amount of undemanding plants like mosses and lichens. Animals are also rare at the Oasis. Exceptions are the Antarctic skua, the Antarctic petrel, the snow petrel, and the Wilson's storm petrel. Occasionally, Adélie penguins can be seen at the oasis.

== History ==
At the beginning of 1939 Germany launched an expedition under the command of captain Alfred Ritscher to explore an uncharted area of the Antarctic. They surveyed an area between latitudes 69°10’ S and 76°30’ S and longitudes 11°30 W and 20°00’ E, totaling 600 000 km^{2} and called it Neuschwabenland, or New Swabia. The area was surveyed by two Dornier hydroplanes, Boreas and Passat. One was piloted by Richard Heinrich Schirmacher, who, on 3 February 1939, spotted both the oasis and the lake at its centre. Schirmacher named both after himself.

=== Novolazarevskaya Station ===
On March 10, 1959, the Soviet Union set up the research station Lazarev on the shelf ice in the region of the Schirmacher Oasis. The station was reinstalled in 1961 into the Oasis and was named Novolazarevskaya. In summer, up to 70 crew members reside at the station. In winter, on average 30 scientists and technicians work at the Novolazarevskaya Station. Research in natural sciences includes geodesy, glaciology, limnology, geomagnetism, geology, biology, meteorology, seismology, and other areas of expertise. On 20 December 2007 the Russian Bath was built near the station. It is the only glued timber building in Antarctica.

=== Georg Forster Station ===
Georg Forster Station Georg-Forster-Station
- Antarctic research station
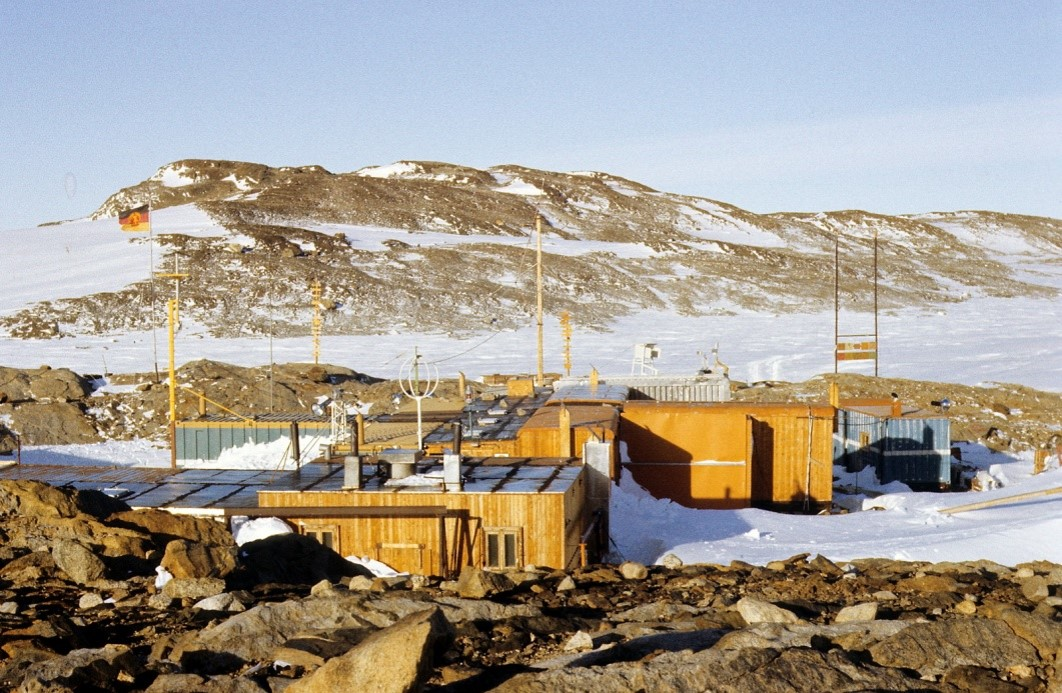
- The station between October 1987 and April 1989
- Interactive map of Georg Forster Station
- Coordinates: 70°46′39″S 11°51′03″E
- Established: 21 April 1976
- Dismantled: February 1993
- Named after: Georg Forster

Government
  - Type: Administration
  - Body: AWI, Germany
- Elevation: 120 m (390 ft)
- Active times: All year-round

On April 21, 1976, approximately two kilometres from the Russian station Novolazarevskaya and about 120 m ASL, the first German research station, the Georg Forster Station, was launched in Antarctica. In 1987, the station, which was run by the GDR, was named after the German naturalist Georg Forster. During its 17 years of existence, more than 100 scientists had worked at the station. In particular, their ozone measurements gained international recognition. The station withdrew service in February 1993, and by 1996 the entire station had been dismantled and disposed of.

After the dissolution of the Eastern Bloc, parts of the Schirmacher Oasis counted among the heaviest polluted regions in Antarctica. Polar explorers from the Alfred Wegener Institute for Polar and Marine Research in Bremerhaven and from the Arctic and Antarctic Research Institute in Saint Petersburg disposed of 1016 tons of scrap metal and refuse from the former GDR polar station and the Russian Novolazarevskaya Station.

The site of the former station is marked by a bronze plaque. It has been designated a Historic Site or Monument (HSM 87), following a proposal by Germany to the Antarctic Treaty Consultative Meeting.

=== Maitri Station ===
In 1981, India launched the Indian Antarctic Programme. In 1983, the Dakshin Gangotri Station was set up on the shelf ice, about 90 km from the Schirmacher Oasis, but was decommissioned in 1989 due to excessive snow accumulation. In 1988, the Maitri Station was installed in the Schirmacher Oasis, approximately 3.5 km from Novolazarevskaya. Maitri is equipped with a meteorological station, as well as a geomagnetic and seismological observatory, and accommodates up to 26 scientists and technicians. During the Twentieth Indian Expedition (2000–2002), Maitri served as the operational base for a range of scientific investigations in Antarctica, including studies of the lakes, geology, atmosphere, and ecology of the Schirmacher Oasis.

== See also ==
- List of Arctic research stations
