= Zub Lake =

Lake in Antarctica

- Location within Antarctica
- Location: Schirmacher Hills, Queen Maud Land
- Coordinates: 70°45′S 11°44′E
- Basin countries: (Antarctica)
- Max. length: 0.5 mi (0.80 km)

Zub Lake (70°45′S 11°44′E) is a lake about 0.5 miles (800 m) long, lying 1 mile (1,600 m) east-southeast of Tsentral'naya Hill in the Schirmacher Hills, Queen Maud Land. The feature was mapped by the Soviet Antarctic Expedition in 1961 and named "Ozero Zub" (tooth lake), presumably for its shape when viewed in plan.
