= Lazarev Ice Shelf =

Geographical feature in Antarctica

Coordinates: 69°37′S 14°45′E

The Lazarev Ice Shelf is that part of the ice shelf fringing the Princess Astrid Coast of Queen Maud Land, Antarctica, that lies between Leningradskiy Island and Verblyud Island. It is part of the western Riiser-Larsen Sea and is about 50 nautical miles (90 km) long, with Razlom Point at its western edge. The ice shelf was first photographed from the air and mapped by the Third German Antarctic Expedition, 1938–39. It was explored and mapped by the Soviet Antarctic Expedition in 1959, and named for Lieutenant (later Admiral) Mikhail P. Lazarev, commander of the sloop Mirnyy.

Opornyy Point is an ice point along the west side of Lazarev Ice Shelf, about 15 nmi (28 km) north of Leningradskiy Island. It was named Mys Opornyy (support point) because the ice shelf at this point rests on the ocean floor.

== See also ==
- Cape Murmanskiy
- Uragannyy Point
