= Novolazarevskaya Station =

Novolazarevskaya Station Новолазаревская
- Antarctic station
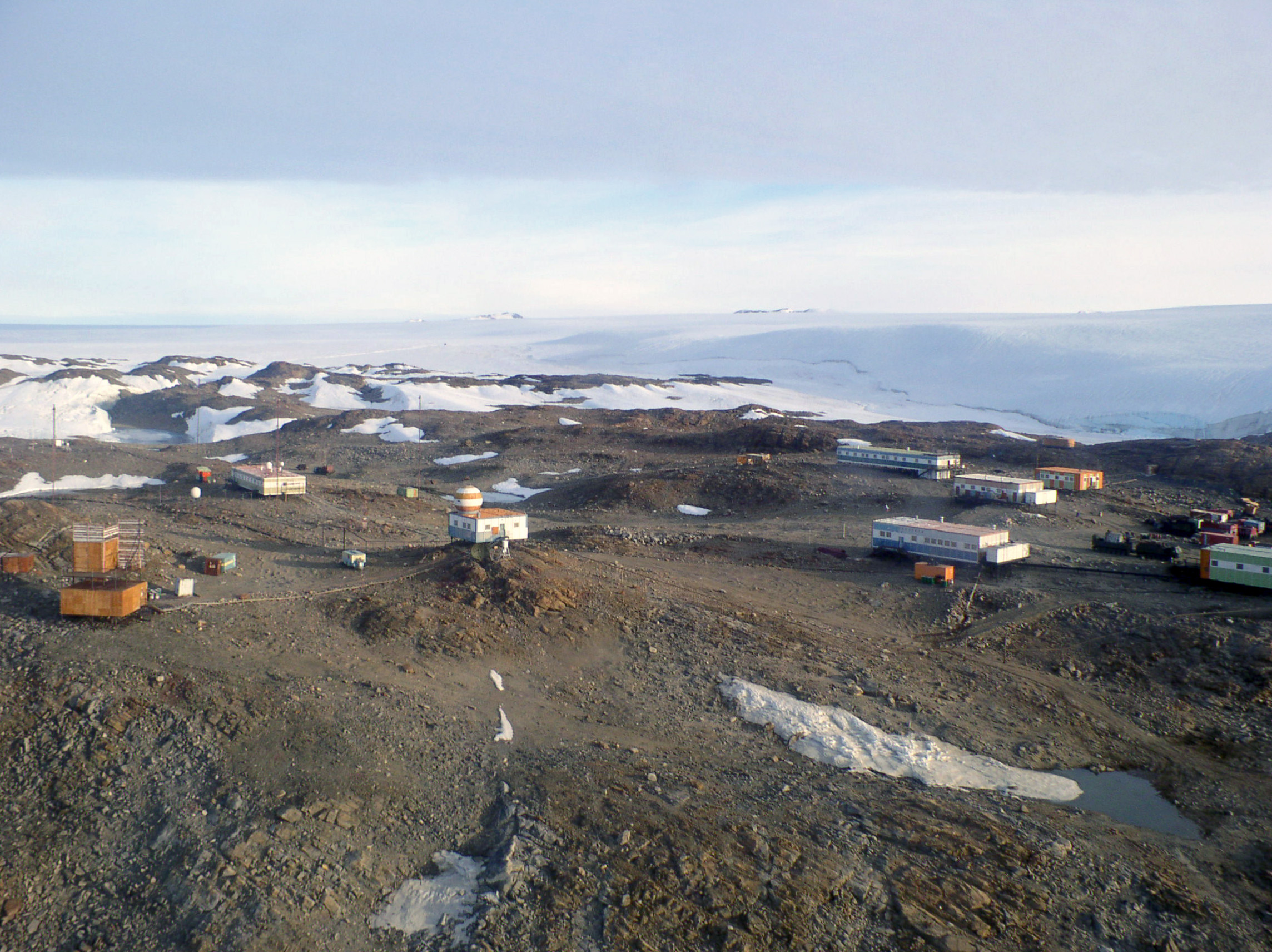
- Novolazarevskaya station in 2006

- Location of Novolazarevskaya Station in Antarctica
- Coordinates: 70°46′37″S 11°49′26″E
- Country: Soviet Union (formerly); Russia
- Location in Antarctica: Schirmacher Oasis; Queen Maud Land; Antarctica
- Administered by: Arctic and Antarctic Research Institute
- Established: 18 January 1961
- Elevation: 102 m (335 ft)

Population (2017)
  - Summer: 70
  - Winter: 40
- UN/LOCODE: AQ NOV
- Type: All-year round
- Period: Annual
- Status: Operational
- Activities: List: Geodesy; Geology; Geomorphology; Glaciology; Limnology
- Website: www.aari.nw.ru

Novolazarevskaya Station (Russian: Станция Новолазаревская) is a Russian, formerly Soviet, Antarctic research station. The station is located at Schirmacher Oasis, Queen Maud Land, 75 km (47 mi) from the Antarctic coast, from which it is separated by the Lazarev Ice Shelf. It was opened on January 18, 1961 by the 6th Soviet Antarctic Expedition. The maximum summer population is 70.

Novolazarevskaya has an airstrip (ICAO:AT17) that serves both research-related and commercial flights. In 2010 GLONASS differential reference station started to work in Novolazarevskaya.

Novolazarevskaya is 3.5 kilometres (2.2 mi) east of India's Maitri research station.

== Climate ==
Climate data for Novolazarevskaya Station
Month	Jan	Feb	Mar	Apr	May	Jun	Jul	Aug	Sep	Oct	Nov	Dec	Year
Mean daily maximum °C (°F)	2.2 (36.0)	−0.8 (30.6)	−5.3 (22.5)	−9.1 (15.6)	−10.6 (12.9)	−12.0 (10.4)	−14.0 (6.8)	−14.6 (5.7)	−13.5 (7.7)	−9.6 (14.7)	−3.2 (26.2)	1.5 (34.7)	−7.4 (18.6)
Daily mean °C (°F)	−0.4 (31.3)	−3.3 (26.1)	−7.8 (18.0)	−11.9 (10.6)	−13.6 (7.5)	−14.9 (5.2)	−17.1 (1.2)	−17.9 (−0.2)	−16.7 (1.9)	−12.6 (9.3)	−5.9 (21.4)	−1.1 (30.0)	−10.3 (13.5)
Mean daily minimum °C (°F)	−2.7 (27.1)	−5.6 (21.9)	−10.1 (13.8)	−14.9 (5.2)	−17.1 (1.2)	−18.4 (−1.1)	−20.8 (−5.4)	−21.6 (−6.9)	−20.4 (−4.7)	−15.7 (3.7)	−8.7 (16.3)	−3.6 (25.5)	−13.3 (8.1)
Average precipitation mm (inches)	2.5 (0.10)	2.7 (0.11)	8.9 (0.35)	14.5 (0.57)	29.0 (1.14)	34.6 (1.36)	34.7 (1.37)	36.3 (1.43)	33.1 (1.30)	24.8 (0.98)	10.8 (0.43)	5.8 (0.23)	237.7 (9.37)
Average relative humidity (%)	56.3	49.6	48.2	46.9	48.9	50.4	49.3	49.9	48.0	49.5	52.3	57.0	50.5
Source: Arctic and Antarctic Research Institute

== Novo Runway ==
Novo Runway
- IATA: none; ICAO: AT17

Summary
- Airport type: Private
- Operator: Antarctic Logistics Centre International (ALCI)
- Serves: Novolazarevskaya and Maitri
- Location: Dronning Maud Land
- Opened: April 6, 2014
- Time zone: {{{timezone}}} (+3.30)
- Coordinates: 70°49′17″S 11°38′36″E

Map
- Location of airfield in Antarctica

Runways
Direction	Length		Surface
Direction	ft	m	Surface
10/28	10,824	3,299	Blue Ice

The Novo runway is a blue ice runway, located 8.7 kilometres (5.4 mi) away, operated by Antarctic Logistics Centre International (ALCI) serves the station and Maitri.

== Appendectomy ==
In April 1961, Dr. Leonid Ivanovich Rogozov, the 27-year-old Soviet surgeon, performed an appendectomy on himself after developing acute appendicitis.

== See also ==
- List of Antarctic research stations
- List of Antarctic field camps
- List of airports in Antarctica
- Soviet Antarctic Expedition
- Leonid Rogozov
