= Princess Astrid Coast =

Area in Antarctica

Coordinates: 70°45′S 12°30′E

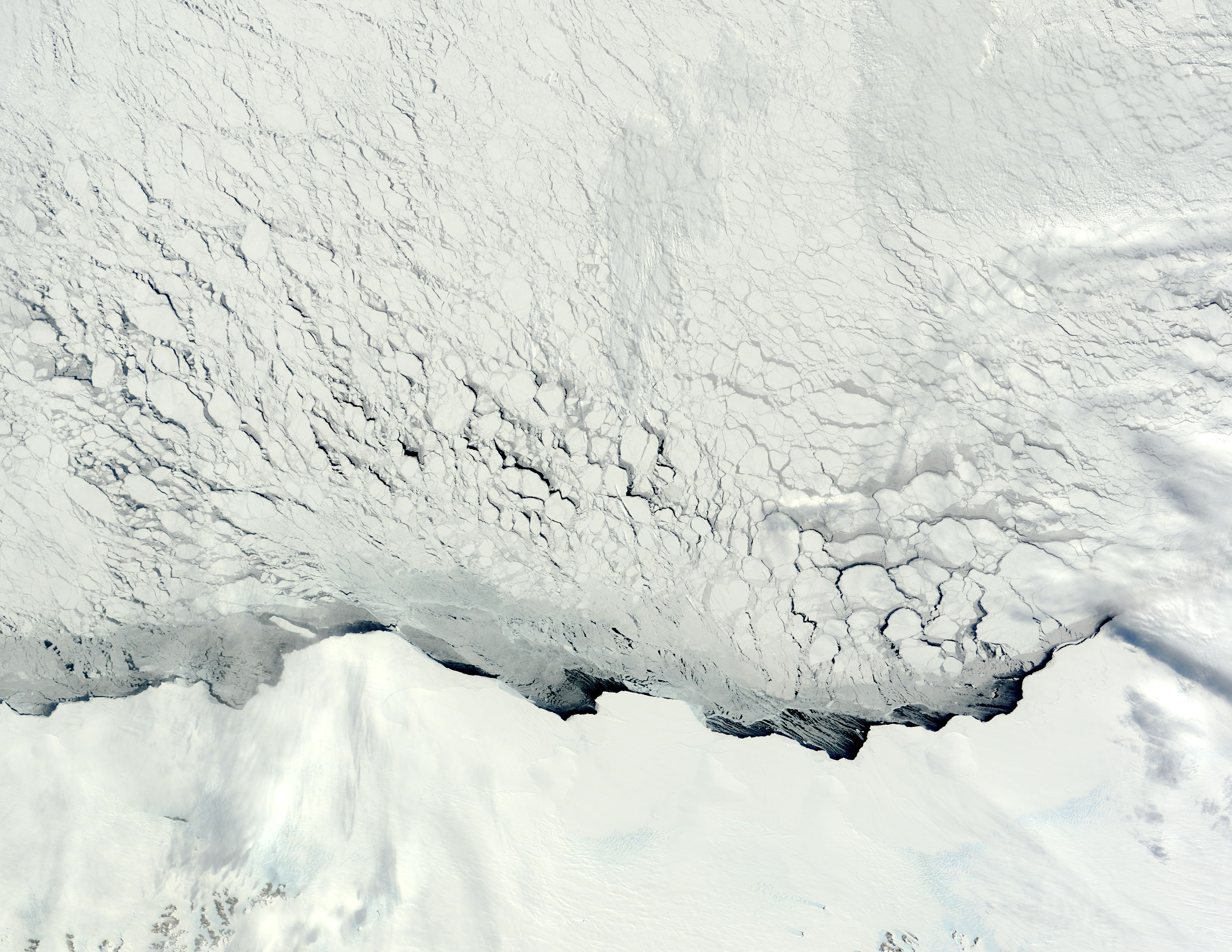
Princesses Astrid and Ragnhild Coasts, Antarctica

Princess Astrid Coast (Norwegian: Prinsesse Astrid Kyst) is a portion of the coast of Queen Maud Land, Antarctica, lying between 5° and 20° E. The entire coast is bordered by ice shelves. The region was discovered by Capt. H. Halvorsen of the Sevilla (ship) in March 1931 and in 1932 was named for Princess Astrid of Norway. The ice of the continental glacier is up to 4,000 meters thick in the interior. These thick glaciers are held in place by coastal mountain ranges. On the Princess Astrid Coast, some of the ice does flow through the mountains, spilling onto the relatively flat land on the Princess Astrid Coast. Also, the cold air spills over the mountains, creating very strong and persistent winds, which makes the snow scour off the tops of the glaciers leaving pale blue patches of bare ice. On top of the coastal line is the ice shelf, which is much smoother. The glacial ice floats on the sea surface which is beyond the chaotic surface of the sea ice which has been solidifying all winter long.

Off the Princess Astrid Coast are the Lazarev Sea and Riiser-Larsen Sea, both marginal seas of the Southern Ocean. According to the Norwegian point of view, King Haakon VII Sea stretches in that place and along the entire coast of Queen Maud land. The central part of Princess Astrid Coast lies the Schiermacher Oasis, where the Soviet Novolazarevskaia scientific station has been operating since 1961 and the Indian Maitri (research station) has been operating since 1989. Previously (1959–1961) the Soviet Lazarev Station operated in the Princess Astrid Coast region. The Coast was discovered in 1931 by Norwegian whalers and was named after a Norwegian princess who was called Princess Astrid. Since 1959 the Princess Astrid Coast has been a region of systematic research by the Soviet antarctic expeditions.
