= Leningradskiy Island =

Island in Leningradskiy Bay, Antarctica

- Location within Antarctica

Geography
- Location: Antarctica
- Coordinates: 70°08′S 12°50′E

Administration
- Administered under the Antarctic Treaty System

Demographics
- Population: Uninhabited

Leningradskiy Island is an ice-covered island situated at the head of Leningradskiy Bay at the western margin of the Lazarev Ice Shelf, Queen Maud Land, Antarctica. The feature rises nearly 100 metres (330 ft) above the general level of the ice shelf which surrounds all but the northern side. It was discovered and mapped by the Soviet Antarctic Expedition in 1961, and named in association with Leningradskiy Bay.

== See also ==
- Cape Murmanskiy
