= Kemp Peak =

Peak southeast of Stefansson Bay

Coordinates: 67°26′S 59°24′E

Kemp Peak is a prominent peak, 340 m, standing close southeast of Stefansson Bay. Discovered in January 1930 by the British Australian and New Zealand Antarctic Research Expedition (BANZARE) under Douglas Mawson and named for Dr. Stanley W. Kemp, British marine biologist and oceanographer who was Director of Research of the Discovery Investigations, 1924–36. This area was subsequently mapped in detail by Norwegian cartographers from aerial photographs taken by the Lars Christensen Expedition, 1936–37. They named the peak Hornet, but Australian parties that explored the area in the 1950s have identified it as Kemp Peak, named earlier by Mawson.
