= Schirmacher Hills =

Line of low coastal hills in Antarctica

Schirmacher Hills (70°45′S 11°40′E) is a line of low coastal hills, 11 nautical miles (20 km) long, with numerous meltwater ponds (Schirmacher Oasis), standing 40 nautical miles (70 km) north of the Humboldt Mountains along the coast of Queen Maud Land. Discovered by the Third German Antarctic Expedition under Alfred Ritscher, 1938–39, and named for Richardheinrich Schirmacher, pilot of the Boreas, one of the expedition seaplanes.

== Features ==
Akkuratnaya Cove is located on the north side of the Schirmacher Hills. Zub Lake is located about 1 mile (1,600 m) east-southeast of Tsentral'naya Hill, which is close to Dlinnoye Lake.
