= Horizon Maritime =

Canadian offshore services company

Horizon Maritime Services Ltd
- Industry: Offshore services
- Founded: 2015; 11 years ago
- Founders: Sean Leet, Steve Widmeyer
- Headquarters: St. John's, N.L., Canada
- Website: horizonmaritime.com

Horizon Maritime Services Ltd is a company which provides vessels and offshore services for arctic duty in Canada and Norway. It is based in St. John's, Newfoundland and Labrador, and its joint ventures include partnerships with two First Nations, the Miawpukek (as Miawpukek Horizon Maritime Services) and the Heiltsuk (as Heiltsuk Horizon); in addition, Horizon operates joint ventures with Kotug as Kotug Canada and with Bourbon as Bourbon Horizon.

== History ==
Horizon Maritime was started in spring 2015, offering services out of Halifax and Mulgrave, Nova Scotia; St. John's, Newfoundland and Labrador; and Fort McMurray, Alberta. It was co-founded by Sean Leet and Steve Widmeyer, with funding from CFFI Ventures, owned by John Risley. The Canadian offshore services market is served by Horizon, Atlantic Towing, Maersk Supply Service, and Secunda Canada.

Initially, Horizon was headquartered in Halifax and provided ship crews for other companies. Horizon acquired its first ship, platform supply vessel MV Horizon Star, in August 2017 for US$45 million; it was ordered as IES Energy by IES Pioneer and launched in 2015 at the Kleven Verft shipyard in Norway, but never was delivered. Horizon Star was christened by Jodie Thornton, married to Horizon executive vice-president Steve Widmeyer, on August 3, 2017 near Ultsteinvik, Norway, and delivered to Bay Bulls, Newfoundland and Labrador two weeks later. Horizon Star was sold to the government of Australia in 2022, which renamed it ADV Reliant.

Horizon acquired Tidewater Enabler from Tidewater in November 2018; the multipurpose ship had been finished in 2010 by STX Offshore in Norway and was renamed to Horizon Enabler. In March 2019, Horizon purchased anchor handling tug supply vessel (AHTS) Bourbon Arctic for US$41.5 million and renamed the ship Horizon Arctic.

Heiltsuk Horizon was formed in May 2018 as a joint venture to bid on a contract to lease two emergency towing vessels to the Canadian Coast Guard. After losing the bid, Heiltsuk Horizon filed a complaint with the Canadian International Trade Tribunal which asserted the winning bidder, Atlantic Towing, had switched the proposed ship masters with less-experienced ones. The Miawpukek Horizon joint venture was launched in June 2020 after recruiting and developing First Nations sailors.

The Miawpukek Horizon joint venture purchased MV Polar Prince (Oqwatnukewey Eleke'wi'ji'jit in Mi'kmaq) in 2021 and operates it as a training ship for its cadets. The ship also has been leased to Students on Ice and OceanGate for excursions.

Horizon also has entered industry partnerships with Kotug International (as Kotug Canada, 2019) and Bourbon (as Horizon Bourbon, 2023). Kotug Canada mostly operates smaller tugboats; in 2021, Kotug Canada acquired the AHTS MV Siem Commander from Secunda Canada and renamed it K.J. Gardner, (Note: K.J. Gardner, IMO number: 9420150, MMSI number: 316040483) which is owned by Kotug and operated by Horizon.

Horizon Maritime was acquired by the American Chouest Group in October 2026.

== Horizon Maritime fleet ==
Name	Image	Type	Built	Operated	Notes
MV Horizon Arctic		Anchor handling tug supply vessel	2015	2019–	Formerly Bourbon Arctic; acquired from Bourbon in March 2019
MV Horizon Enabler (Note: Horizon Enabler: IMO number: 9440203, MMSI number: 314627000)		Offshore supply vessel	2010	2018–	Horizon Enabler carries one ROV (Triton XLX) and is equipped with a 100 t (110 short tons) revolving crane.
MV Horizon Star (Note: Horizon Star: IMO number: 9752254, MMSI number: 503000206)		Offshore supply vessel	2015	2017–2022	Horizon Star is similar in purpose and configuration to Horizon Enabler; sold in 2022 and renamed to ADV Reliant.
MV Polar Prince		Icebreaker	1959	2021–	Formerly CCGS Sir Humphrey Gilbert; acquired in 2021 and serves as a dedicated training ship for Miawpukek Horizon cadets
MV Horizon Glacier (Note: Horizon Glacier, registration number C19246QC)		Ice-strengthened tugboat	2011	2018–	Built by GFFM LeClerc as Cercle Polaire; later renamed to Halifax Tugger
MV Horizon Chinook (Note: Horizon Chinook, registration number C28463NS)		Ice-strengthened tugboat	2018	2018–	Built by Chantier Meridien Industrie
MV Horizon Aurora		Ice-strengthened tugboat	2018	2018–	
