= Horizon Arctic =

Deep sea operations support ship

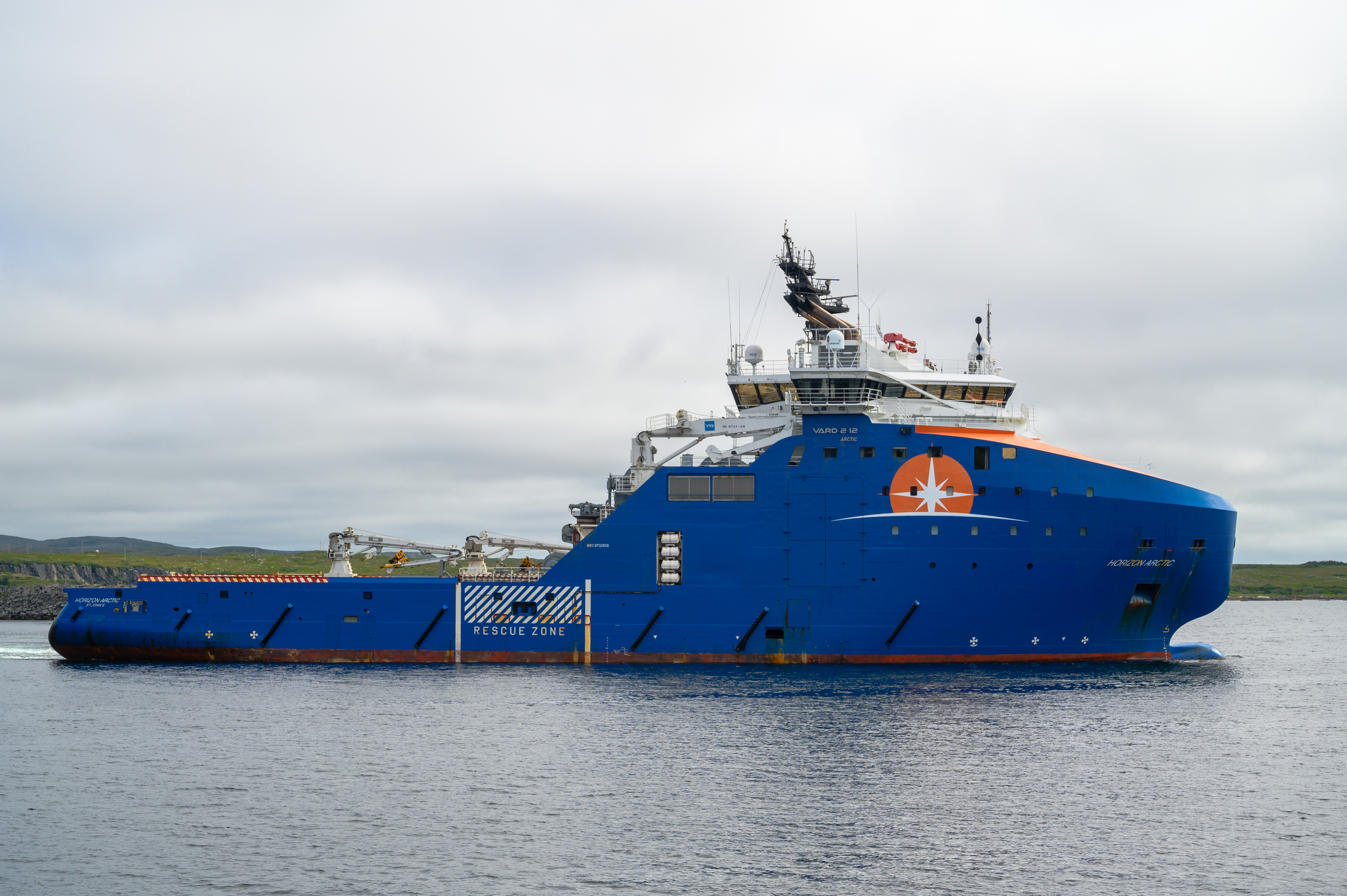
- Horizon Arctic at Port aux Basques in August 2022

History

Norway
- Name: Bourbon Arctic
- Operator: Bourbon Offshore Norway AS
- Port of registry: Fosnavåg, Norway (2016–2019); Ålesund, Norway (2019–2020)
- Builder: Vard Tulcea SA (Tulcea, Romania) (hull); Vard Brattvaag (Brattvåg, Norway) (outfitting)
- Cost: US$119 million
- Yard number: 802
- Laid down: 17 April 2014
- Launched: 28 January 2015
- Completed: 25 February 2016
- Fate: Sold to Horizon Maritime in March 2019

Canada
- Name: Horizon Arctic
- Owner: Horizon Maritime Offshore AS
- Operator: Horizon Maritime Services
- Port of registry: St. John's, Newfoundland, Canada (2020–2022; 2023–present); Bridgetown, Barbados (2022–2023)
- Acquired: 2019
- Identification: IMO number: 9732838; MMSI number: 316003140; Call sign: CHA2033
- Status: In service

General characteristics
- Class & type: Vard 2 12 anchor handling tug supply vessel (AHTS)
- Tonnage: 8,143 GT; 2,443 NT; 4,129 DWT
- Length: 93.6 m (307 ft 1 in)
- Beam: 24 m (78 ft 9 in)
- Draught: 7.8 m (25 ft 7 in)
- Depth: 9.8 m (32 ft 2 in)
- Ice class: 1B (hull strengthened to 1A)
- Installed power: 2 × Bergen B32:40V12A (2 × 6,000 kW); 3 × Bergen C25:33L8A (3 × 2,880 kW)
- Propulsion: Two controllable pitch propellers (2 × 9,400 kW); Two bow thrusters (2 × 1,200 kW); One retractable bow azimuth thruster (1 x 1,200 kW); Two stern thrusters (2 × 1,200 kW)
- Speed: 16 knots (30 km/h; 18 mph) (maximum); 14 knots (26 km/h; 16 mph) (service)

Horizon Arctic is an anchor handling tug supply vessel (AHTS) completed in 2016 by Vard Group at its Brattvåg shipyard as Bourbon Arctic for Bourbon Offshore Norway AS, part of the Marseille-based Bourbon group. As of 2023, it is operated by Horizon Maritime of Canada. Under Horizon, it served as the surface support vessel for the Titan submersible during its 2021 and 2022 survey expeditions to the wreck of the Titanic, conducted by OceanGate.

== Design ==
Horizon Arctic is designed for worldwide deep sea offshore operations such as anchor handling and towing services for oil rigs. In addition, the vessel is outfitted for rescue, fire-fighting, remotely operated vehicles (ROV), and oil spill response operations. For Arctic operations, it is winterized and built to Finnish-Swedish ice class 1B with hull additionally strengthened to higher ice class 1A. The 93.6 metres (307 ft 1 in) long and 24 metres (78 ft 9 in) wide vessel has accommodation for up to 60 persons in 24 single and 18 double cabins.

Horizon Arctic's main power plant consists of two 12-cylinder Bergen B32:40V12A main engines rated at 6,000 kW (8,000 hp) each and three 8-cylinder Bergen C25:33L8A diesel generators producing 2,880 kW (3,860 hp) each. The vessel's dual propulsion system can operate in both conventional and diesel-electric modes. The vessel's twin shaft lines with controllable pitch propellers can be driven with a maximum power of 18,800 kW (25,200 hp) and, when used in boost mode together with the 1,200 kW (1,600 hp) drop-down azimuthing bow thruster, generate a bollard pull of 307 tonnes (338 short tons). In addition, Horizon Arctic has four 1,200 kW (1,600 hp) transverse thrusters, two in the bow and two in the stern, to enable dynamic positioning during offshore operations.

== History ==
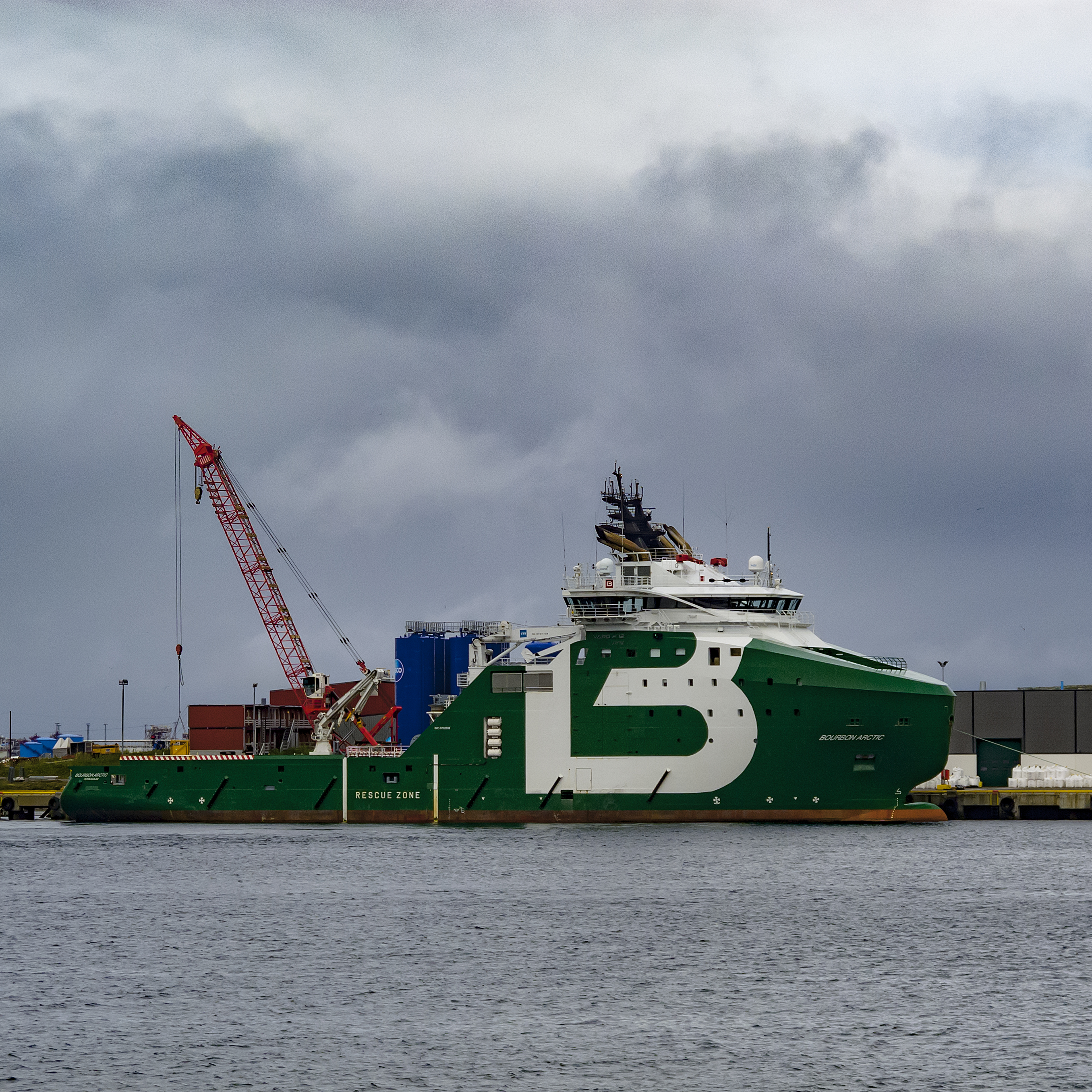
Bourbon Arctic in Hammerfest (2017)

Bourbon Arctic was ordered in February 2014 for US$119 million and was delivered to Bourbon Offshore in March 2016. It was Bourbon's largest vessel. An earlier ship built to the same design by Vard was delivered as Skandi Iceman for DOF ASA in 2013.

Bourbon Offshore sold Bourbon Arctic to Horizon Maritime in 2019 for an estimated US$41.5 million. Following the acquisition, the ship was repainted and renamed to Horizon Arctic, continuing to operate from Norway for Horizon Maritime's local branch.

Horizon Arctic was chartered by OceanGate to serve as its surface support vessel for its RMS Titanic survey expeditions in 2021 and again in 2022. For 2023, OceanGate switched to MV Polar Prince, reportedly due to cost. That February, Horizon Arctic had been attached to the Bourbon Horizon joint venture headquartered in St. John's, which would operate six platform supply vessels alongside the large AHTS to provide offshore services across the Atlantic Ocean; increased demand had created a competitive market for the services of Horizon Arctic.

On June 22, 2023, a ROV from Horizon Arctic discovered a debris field approximately 490 m (1,600 ft) off the bow of the Titanic, which included the tail section of the submersible Titan. The Odysseus 6K ROV was provided and operated by Pelagic Research Services.
