= Deep Sea Supply =

Deep Sea Supply Plc
- Company type: Public
- Industry: Shipping
- Founded: 2005
- Defunct: June 21, 2017
- Fate: Merged with Farstad Shipping and Solstad Offshore
- Headquarters: Cyprus
- Area served: Global
- Key people: Odd Brevik (CEO)

Deep Sea Supply is an international operator of offshore supply vessels. It operates nine anchor handling tug supply vessels (AHTS) and two platform supply vessels (PSV). 17 ships are under construction. The main office is located in Arendal, Norway though the company is officially headquartered in Cyprus and listed on the Oslo Stock Exchange.

== History ==
Deep Sea Supply ASA was created in 2005 and listed on the Oslo Stock Exchange to build up a portfolio of North Sea and international operating supply vessels. The first acquisition was six AHTSs from Tidewater the same year, followed the next year by the purchase of an order of 22 newbuilding contracts from Sea Tankers Management. Two additional ships were also bought in 2006. The same year the Cyprus-registered company Deep Sea Supply Plc was created to move the companies assets from Norway to Cyprus. Deep Sea Supply is largely institutionally owned company that trades on the Oslo Bors. The largest owning interest in the company is Hemen Holdings. Hemen is a holding company that is owned by Norwegian Shipping Tycoon John Fredrikson.

In June 2017, Deep Sea Supply merged with Farstad Shipping and Solstad Offshore to create Solstad Farstad.
