= Farstad Shipping =

Shipping company

Farstad Shipping ASA
- Company type: Allmennaksjeselskap
- Industry: Shipping
- Founded: 1956
- Defunct: 21 June 2017
- Fate: Merged with Deep Sea Supply and Solstad Offshore
- Headquarters: Ålesund, Norway
- Area served: Global
- Key people: Karl-Johan Bakken (CEO)
- Products: AHTS, PSV, SUBSEA
- Number of employees: 2 200
- Website: www.farstad.com

Farstad Shipping (OSE: FAR) is a publicly listed supply shipping company with its corporate headquarters in Ålesund, Norway. The company has approximately 2,200 employees, of which 1,965 are employed offshore.

Farstad Shipping focuses on large, advanced vessels in the anchor handling, supply, and subsea segments. The company's operations are mainly concentrated on the markets in North-West Europe, Brazil, and Indian Pacific, with offices in Norway, Scotland, Australia, Singapore, and Brazil. The company is 46% owned by the Farstad family. Farstad Shipping has been listed on the Oslo Stock Exchange since 1988.

In June 2017, Farstad Shipping merged with Deep Sea Supply and Solstad Offshore to create Solstad Farstad.

== History ==
Farstad Shipping was founded as a traditional shipping company in 1956. The company was one of the first operators in the North Sea that decided to focus on offshore service vessels. In 1973 the company contracted its first supply vessel, an anchor handling vessel of the type UT 704.

Until the mid-1980s the company grew through various forms of collaboration both concerning ownership and operations. The acquisition of two service vessel fleets during the second half of the 80's was an important event in the further development of the company. At the same time, the company built independent operational and marketing functions. During this period, the ship-owning part was gathered in one company.

Since 1990, the renewal and growth of the fleet ha largely taken place by selling older vessels and implementing a considerable newbuild programme. This growth has been founded in the Norwegian maritime cluster. Farstad Shipping's international presence increased significantly during the 2000s.

== Operations ==
Farstad Shipping is currently among the six largest companies worldwide in the market for large and medium-sized supply vessels. About 63% of this world fleet is in North-West Europe, Brazil, and the Indian Pacific where the company's activities are mainly concentrated. Farstad Shipping has a market share measured in the number of vessels of about 6% in these markets.

Farstad Shipping's fleet consists of the following vessel types:

- Anchor handling tug supply vessels: Specially designed vessels for anchor handling and towing offshore platforms, barges, and production modules/ vessels.
- Platform supply vessels: Specially designed vessels for transporting supplies and equipment to and from offshore installations. These vessels transport general cargo, primarily in containers.
- Subsea: Vessels specially designed for operations at great depths, installation, and maintenance of seabed facilities.
