= Solstad Offshore =

Solstad Offshore ASA
- Company type: Public (OSE: SOFF)
- Industry: Shipping
- Founded: 1964
- Headquarters: Karmøy Municipality, Norway
- Area served: Global
- Services: Supply ships
- Website: www.solstad.com

Solstad Offshore (OSE: SOFF) is a Norwegian offshore service and supply ship shipping company that operates 89 vessels and including 26 construction service vessels, 21 anchor handling tug supply vessels and 42 platform supply vessels. The company is based in Skudeneshavn, but also has offices in Ålesund, Aberdeen, Rio de Janeiro, Perth, Singapore, Manila and Odesa.

== History ==
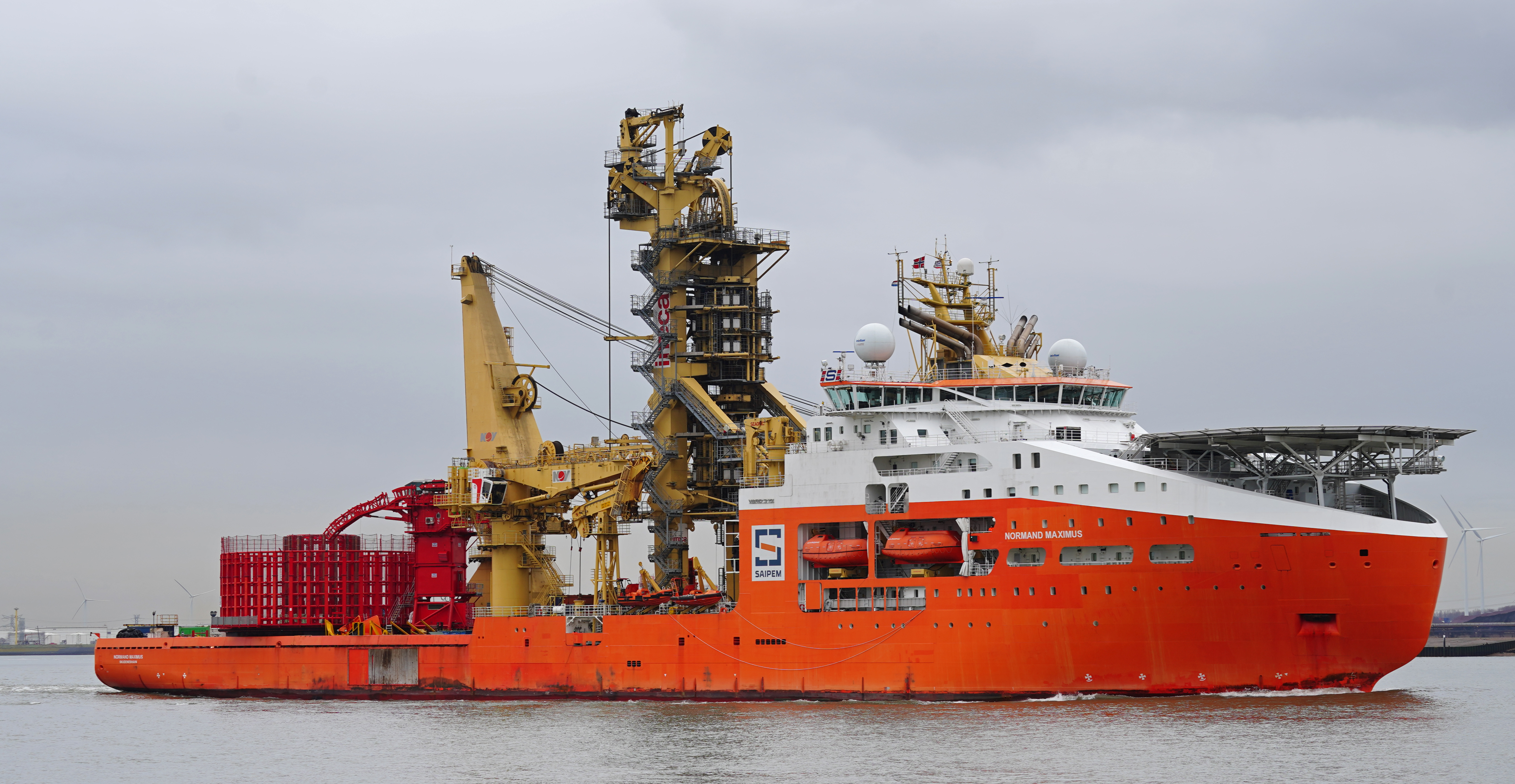
Normand Maximus, a subsea construction vessel and the largest ship in the Solstad fleet

The company was founded as Solstad Rederi by Johannes Solstad in 1964, in a town called Skudeneshavn, on the island of Karmøy, where it is still headquartered to this day. It started off with ten bulk carriers in the range of 7,000 tonnes deadweight (DWT) to 14,000 DWT, but entered the offshore supply sector in 1973 with the delivery of four supply ships. By 1982 the entire dry bulk fleet had been sold and Solstad continued as a pure offshore vessel operator, though from 1989 to 1998 it operated five handysize bulk carriers. A fleet renewal program started in 1996 increased the fleet size from 12 to 43 by 2007. The same year it was floated on the Oslo Stock Exchange, though the Solstad family retains a major ownership in the company.

Since its start in 1964, Solstad Offshore ASA has become a large supplier of modern and advanced vessels for offshore service, with worldwide activities and projects for many major oil companies.

Solstad Offshore ASA is a member of the Norwegian Shipowners Association (Rederiforbundet). The company employs about 1,800 people, and has since 2005 been the shipping company with most Norwegian crew sailing in international trade.

In October 2021, Solstad Offshore, Aker Solutions ASA and DeepOcean Norway AS joined forces to create Windstaller Alliance. The partnership aims to provide the world's most cost-efficient and complete product supply, fabrication and marine services offering within offshore wind. The alliance will also pursue other offshore renewables segments.

The company has offices in Skudeneshavn (Norway), Aberdeen (United Kingdom), Singapore (Singapore), Macaé and Rio de Janeiro (Brazil) and Perth (Australia).

In June 2017, Solstad Offshore merged with Farstad Shipping and Deep Sea Supply to become Solstad Farstad.

In October 2018, the company's name was changed to Solstad Offshore ASA.

In March 2023 Solstad Offshore sold the Solstad PSV fleet of 37 vessels to Tidewater, the remaining fleet of 40 CSV and AHTS vessels remained under Solstad Offshore.
