= ROV Odysseus 6K =

American remotely operated underwater vehicle

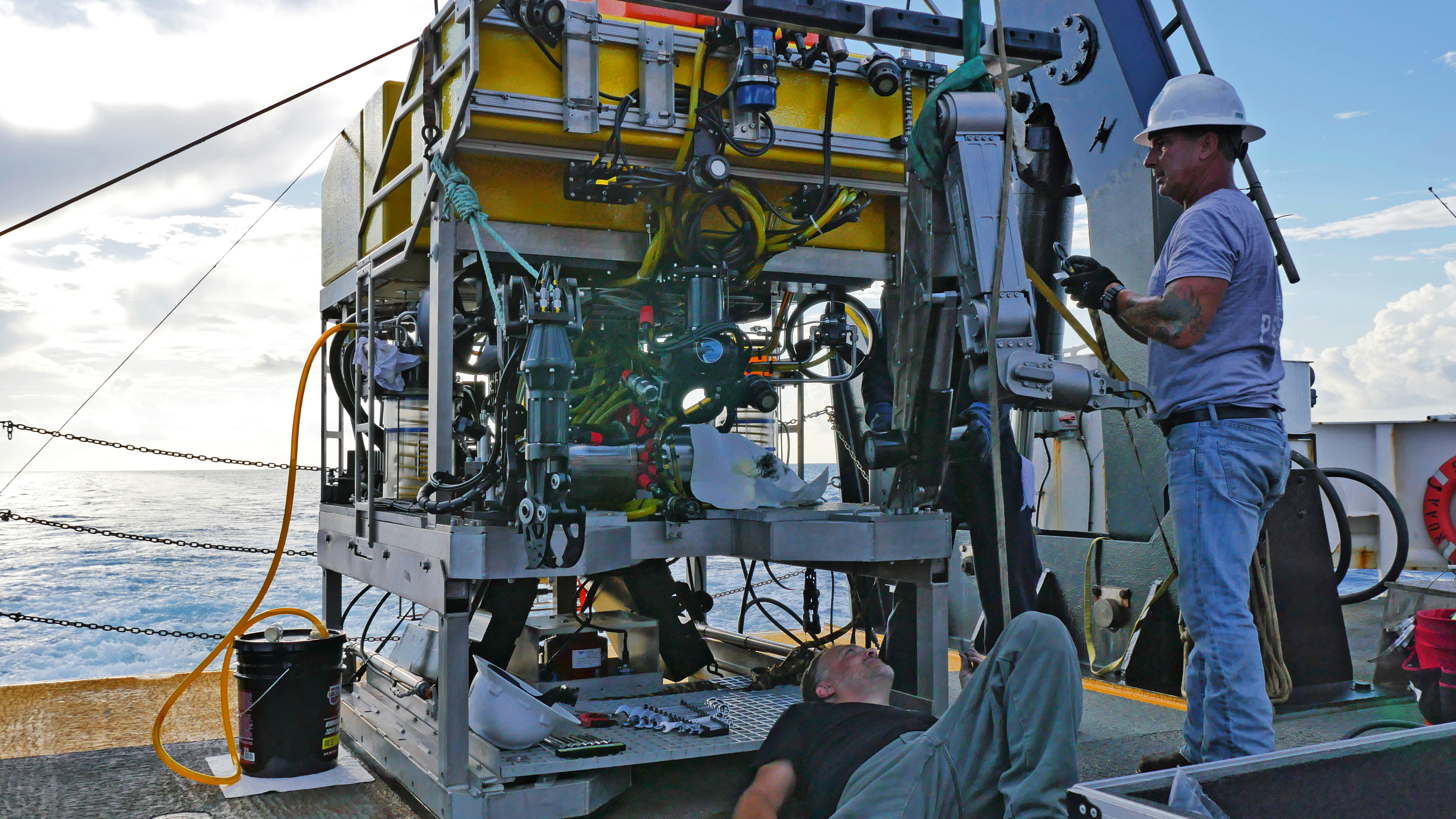
- ROV pilot and engineers Kris Ingram and Paul SanAcore preparing ROV Odysseus (2017 configuration) for a dive on the West Florida slope. Image by Ralf Meyer, Green Fire Productions for NOAA

History

United States
- Name: ROV Odysseus 6K
- Owner: Pelagic Research Services
- Operator: Pelagic Research Services
- Builder: PRS in collaboration with MPH Engineering
- Homeport: South Wellfleet, Massachusetts
- Status: In service

General characteristics
- Type: Remotely operated underwater vehicle
- Length: 98 in (2,490 mm)
- Beam: 59 1/2 in (1,510 mm)
- Height: 88 1/4 in (2,240 mm)
- Propulsion: 25 hp (19 kW) with 7 thrusters (4× lateral, 3× vertical)
- Test depth: 20,000 ft (6,000 m)

ROV Odysseus 6K is a remotely operated underwater vehicle designed and operated by Pelagic Research Services of South Wellfleet, Massachusetts. The ROV is named for Odysseus, protagonist of the Odyssey, and its maximum rated depth, 6,000 m (20,000 ft), measured as metre sea water.

== Design ==
The ROV is launched and recovered using an A-frame crane designed by Hydramec, and is connected to the host through 7,500 m (24,600 ft) of umbilical from Fibron. Odysseus 6K is operated from the Odysseus Control Van, a converted 20 ft (6.1 m) intermodal container, which includes multiple monitors; optionally, the equipment can be brought aboard and operated from an interior room.

There are seven hydraulic thrusters, with four horizontal (lateral) and three vertical. Maximum power output is 25 hp (19 kW), measured at the shaft.

The ROV has multiple payload skids that mount to the bottom of the vehicle and are built for specific operations, primarily scientific research, and can include suction and D-samplers. The standard science skid measures 47 3/4 in (1,210 mm) W × 32 in (810 mm) L × 15 in (380 mm) H. Trays can be extended using the onboard hydraulic system, and are intended for retrieving samples and/or carrying sensors and/or equipment.

=== Updates ===
Pelagic initially purchased the H6500 ROV from Deep Ocean Exploration and Research (DOER Marine) and marketed its services as the Deep Water ROV System, with a rated maximum depth of 6,500 m (21,300 ft), in 2015. It was a modular system with a distinctive orange float. In its basic, untested configuration, it was stated to operate to a depth of 4,000 m (13,000 ft), limited by winch capacity; additional equipment was required for the deep-diving configuration. H6500 measured 55 in (1,400 mm) W × 80 in (2,000 mm) L × 58 in (1,500 mm) H with a mass of 2,700 lb (1,225 kg) and a maximum payload of 110 lb (50 kg). By October 2015, Pelagic had renamed the H6500 to Odysseus. Initial testing of the H6500 configuration failed several functional benchmarks, and Pelagic ceased working with DOER Marine.

Pelagic redesigned and built in collaboration with MPH Engineering a new, single-body ROV system that began sea trials in 2016. As completed in January 2017, the new Odysseus 6k measured 55 1/2 in (1,410 mm) W × 93 in (2,400 mm) L × 83 1/4 in (2,110 mm) H with a mass of 3,128 lb (1,419 kg), and its maximum depth was de-rated slightly to 6,000 m (20,000 ft). The float is now yellow. The updated Odysseus includes a welded aluminum frame that can lift more than 4,000 lb (1,800 kg) in its payload tray.

Additional updates to equipment and structures have resulted in an increase in the mass, which is now 5,500 lb (2,495 kg). The yellow float has been retained, and a blue stripe bearing the name Odysseus has been added.

== Operating history ==
ROV Odysseus 6K has been used to survey deep-sea coral on the West Florida slope in 2017.

On June 22, 2023, Odysseus 6K found a debris field left by the catastrophic implosion of the crewed submersible Titan, which had departed from its host ship, MV Polar Prince on June 18. Odysseus was operating from AHTS Horizon Arctic. The ROV was later used to recover debris from the wreck of Titan.
