= PG Marine Group =

PG Marine Group - Ing Per Gjerdrum AS
- Type: Prive
- Industry: Oil and gas extraction
- Founded: 1982
- Founder: Per Gjerdrum
- Headquarters: Asker, Norway
- Key people: Roy Norum (CEO)
- Products: PG-MACS
- Revenue: NOK 540 million (2008)
- Operating income: NOK 68.1 million (2008)
- Owner: Gjerdrum, Norum and Eide families.
- Number of employees: 46
- Website: www.pg-marinegroup.com

PG Marine Group - Ing Per Gjerdrum AS is a family firm that was founded in 1982 by Per Gjerdrum, owned by the families Gjerdrum, Norum, Eide. The firm started as a pump supplier for the Norwegian maritime market. It has evolved to a designer and supplier of cargo handling systems for offshore supply vessels, and has a significant export to Brazil, China, Singapore and Europe – where PG is dominant market leaders.

The firm, together with the NLI Group, was awarded in 2007 a contract worth NOK 50 million kronerfor building a chemical injection modular to the Nye Gjøa-platform. The same year the firm obtained a contract worth NOK 100 million for delivering a loading handling system PG-MACS to the German Harms Offshore.
