= MV Normand Maximus =

Norwegian subsea construction vessel

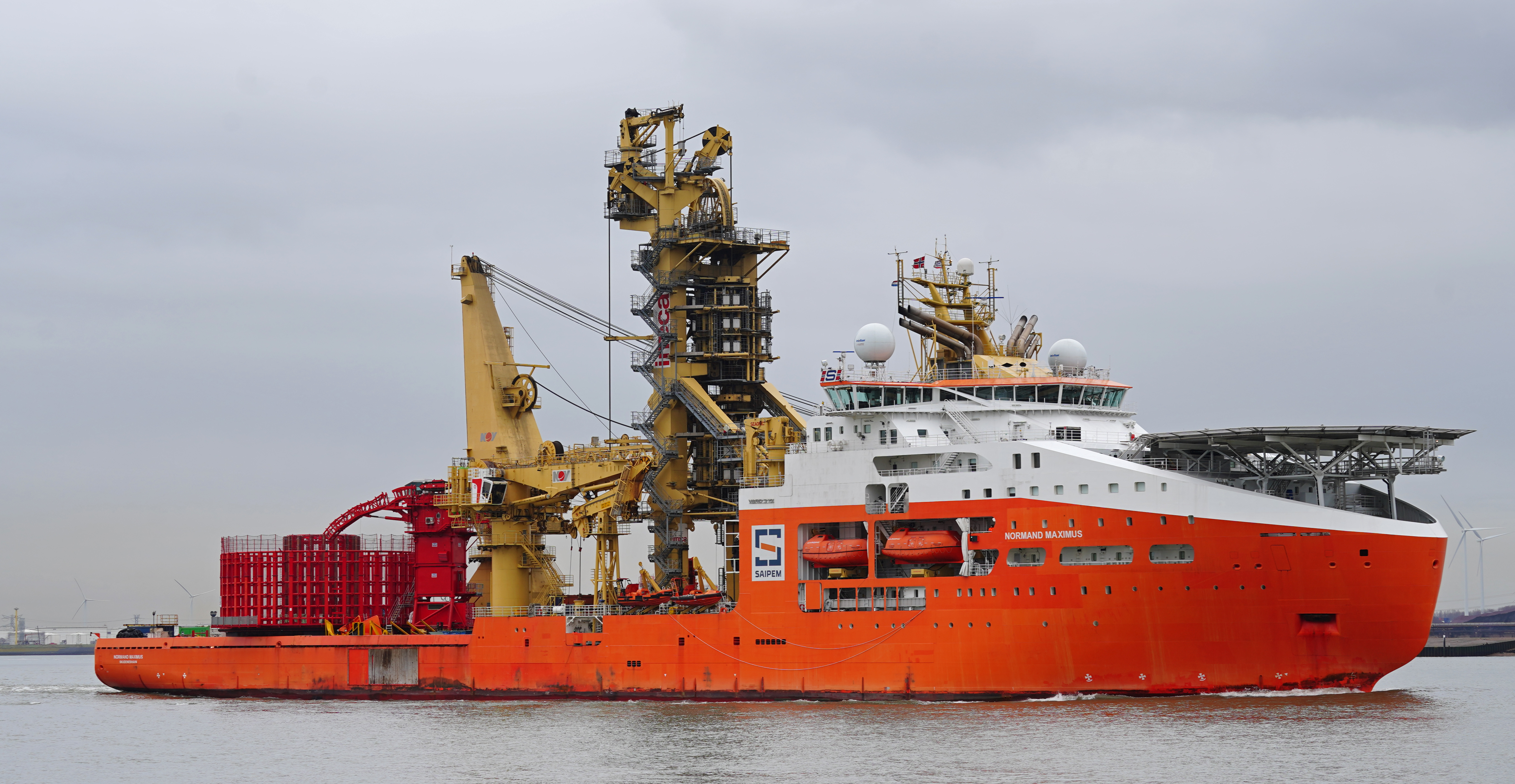

History
- Name: Normand Maximus
- Owner: Solstad Offshore
- Port of registry: Skudeneshavn, Norway
- Completed: 2016
- Identification: IMO number: 9744518; MMSI number: 258987000

General characteristics
- Tonnage: 13,598 DWT
- Length: 178 m (584 ft 0 in)
- Beam: 33 m (108 ft 3 in)

MV Normand Maximus is a subsea construction vessel and the largest ship in the Solstad Offshore fleet. The ship has a deadweight tonnage of 13,598 and a gross tonnage of 26,832. It is 178 meters (584 ft 0 in) long and 33 meters (108 ft 3 in) wide, and has a reported draft of 7.8 meters (25 ft 7 in). Additionally, it has a 900-ton crane, a 550-ton Vertical Flex Lay System, and can accommodate up to 180 people.

== History ==
While Normand Maximus was off the coast of Brazil in February 2017, workers from Baker Hughes were conducting pre-commissioning tests in advance of the ship's deployment as an offshore platform for Saipem. During pressure testing of the gas flow system, the mixture of monoethylene glycol and air in the system exploded. Several valves and pipes were blown, and one employee was killed by the incident. In 2020, Saipem cancelled the charter for Normand Maximus early, only four years into its eight-year contract.

In February 2022, it was announced that Normand Maximus, along with sister ships Normand Frontier, Normand Pioneer, and Normand Navigator, had been chartered for a total of $45.8 million. The American Shipping Company from Oslo acquired the vessel in May 2022 through a long-term bareboat charter. The following year, in May 2023, a letter of intent for the ship was signed with another offshore company. The vessel would be under contract beginning in 2024, for at least 490 days thereafter.
