= Ebb Tide (ship) =

Ebb Tide was an American vessel. She was the first vessel designed and built especially for supply materials and stores to offshore drilling platforms.

In 1955 Alden J. "Doc" Laborde, not satisfied with performance of ex-navy amphibious assault barges, used to do this job, worked out new concept of vessel, propelled by two powerful engines with bridge very forward and long open deck on aft (Ship was 119 feet long with open deck length 90 feet).

Ebb Tide went into service in 1956 and became the first boat of Tidewater Company, which later grown to worldwide ship-owner.

Vessels designed with those principles are most popular among platform supply vessels till today.

== Sources ==
http://www.offshore-mag.com/articles/print/volume-67/issue-9/supplement/tide-anything-but-ebbing-for-the-special-offshore-vessel-industry.html
