= Bourbon (group) =

France-based shipping company

- ISIN: FR0004548873
- Industry: holding company activities
- Headquarters: Marseille

Bourbon is a shipping company based in Marseilles, France. The company operates in the field of surface and submarine maritime services, on oil, gas and wind farms. Bourbon has a total of 6,820 employees across more than 30 countries.

== Business ==
Bourbon's activity revolves around 4 businesses:

- Maritime transport services, focusing on hydrocarbon exploration and extraction, such as anchoring, towing, transportation, and floating production storage and offloading (FPSO);
- Speedboat transportation for personnel, as an alternative to helicopters;
- Subsea operations supporting the development of oil and gas fields; inspection, maintenance and repair (IMR) of offshore structures at depths of up to 4,000 m (13,000 ft);
- Transport, installation and maintenance of floating wind farms.

== History ==
=== 1948-1988 ===
In 1948, the Bourbon Group was born from the merger of several family companies on the island of Reunion, with a view to reviving the local sugar industry, under the name of Sucreries de Bourbon. It was then directed by Émile Hugot. Its markets were sugar and rum for metropolitan France.

=== 1989-1999: diversification and IPO ===
In 1989, the group diversified, first in La Réunion, into industrial fishing (1989), mass distribution (1991) and dairy products (1992).

Subsequently, via its Vindémia subsidiary, Bourbon established the Score supermarket chain in the Indian Ocean and in Vietnam

Then, the group continued its diversification in mainland France with the acquisition of 50% of Compagnie Chambon (Marseilles) in 1991, taking control of the company Surf. The group then expanded into offshore oil and gas maritime services, by acquiring the companies Les Abeilles (towage) and Setaf-Saget (solid bulk transport) in 1996. In 1998, the Bourbon Group went public, on the Second Market of the Paris Stock Exchange.

=== 2000-2006: refocusing on maritime services ===
The group separated from its historical activities between 2001 and 2002 and accelerated its refocusing on maritime services by positioning itself with, from 2003, on deep offshore maritime services in Brazil and West Africa and in 2004 on subsea operations by acquiring the company Gaia Enterprise, which a year later became Bourbon Offshore Gaia.

In October 2003, Bourbon entered the capital of Naïade Resorts, a group managing the hotels Les Villas du Lagon, Les Villas du Récif and Les Créoles. In August 2007, the group resold its shares to shareholders of the hotel group.

In 2005, Vindémia was sold to the Casino Group; the sale became final in 2007. The group also bought out CBo Territoria, a property development company.

Also in 2005, the Bourbon Group became simply Bourbon. The head office, first based in La Réunion, in Sainte-Marie, was transferred to Paris in June 2005. Bourbon entered the SBF 120 index of the Paris Stock Exchange in 2006.

=== 2007-2016: offshore oil and gas marine services ===
Bourbon sold its port towage business in 2007 and positioned itself in the Inspection, Maintenance and Repair (IMR) market for offshore oil fields. In 2008, Bourbon acquired DNT Offshore, an Italian company specializing in underwater robot operations. The group then separated from its "ancillary" activities (sweets, bulk transport, etc.) to refocus on offshore maritime services. At the end of 2014, the oil sector was marked by the sudden drop in the price of a barrel of oil, the start of a deep crisis for the entire offshore market.

=== 2017-2020 ===
In December 2017, Bourbon was transferred from Paris to Marseilles (with ratification on May 30, 2018).

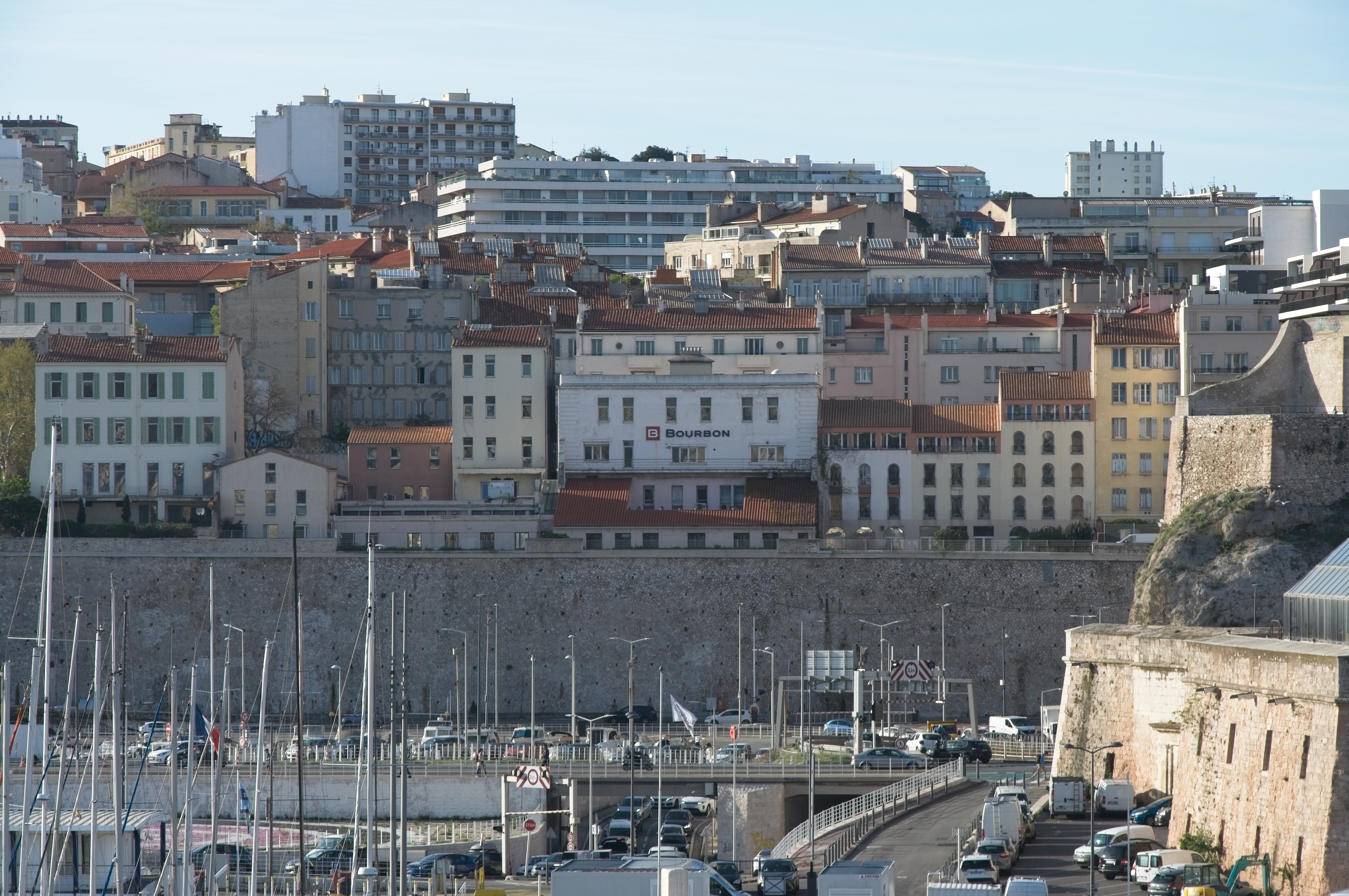
Point of view on Bourbon building in Marseilles, March 2024

The offshore market crisis led Bourbon to sign a debt restructuring agreement with its creditor banks in mid-2017. Without a positive sign of market recovery, the group announced in mid-March 2018 a net loss, group share, of 576.3 million euros for 2017. It reopened these negotiations on April 20, 2018: in agreement with its shareholders, it announced suspended rent payments and debt servicing pending ongoing negotiations with lessors and creditors, in order to focus funds on "operational priorities and market recovery", which "should encourage parties to reach an agreement as soon as possible". In view of the financial difficulties, its shareholders authorized it to postpone for one year an interest payment of approximately 3.9 million euros, normally due in April 2018.

In July 2019, heavily indebted, the group requested the opening of receivership proceedings for its 2 holding companies Bourbon Corporation and Bourbon Maritime. Which is accepted on August 7. The title of the company collapses on the stock market. On November 8, 2019, the listing of the security is suspended. The court's decision on the takeover of the group comes on December 23, 2019 when only one official offer from the creditor banks has been filed.

On January 10, 2020, Société Phocéenne de Participation (SPP), owned by a group of French banks uniting the creditors representing 75% of the group's debt, acquired 100% of the assets of Bourbon Corporation (including the Bourbon brands) and became the group's new majority shareholder. The finalization of the financial restructuring in December 2020 brought new shareholders into the capital of the SPP: ICBCL and Standard Chartered Bank with approximately 18% and 10% of the capital respectively.

The January 2020 disposal caused a "total loss" for the former shareholders. In April 2020, the former holding company (Bourbon Corporation), formerly majority-owned by Jaccar Holdings (which owned 52.8% of the capital on July 14, 2019), was placed in compulsory liquidation. The company shares were delisted on June 22, 2020.

In October 2020, Bourbon sold Les Abeilles to the Econocom group.

According to the economic daily Les Echos in June 2023, the banks that have been shareholders of the group since 2020 reportedly mandated a service provider to sell the oilfield services group.
