= Tidewater (marine services) =

American marine services corporation

Tidewater Inc.
- Type: Public
- Traded as: NYSE: TDW; Russell 3000 Component
- Industry: Marine Transportation
- Founded: 1956
- Founder: Laborde Family
- Headquarters: Houston, Texas, US
- Area served: Worldwide
- Key people: Quintin V. Kneen (President, CEO & Director)
- Revenue: ▲US$ 1,346 million (2024)
- Operating income: −63,800,000 ±100000 United States dollar (2020)
- Net income: ▲$ 180 million (2024)
- Total assets: ▲$ 2.075 billion (2024)
- Total equity: ▲$ 1,115 million (2024)
- Number of employees: 7,700 - 2024
- Website: www.tdw.com

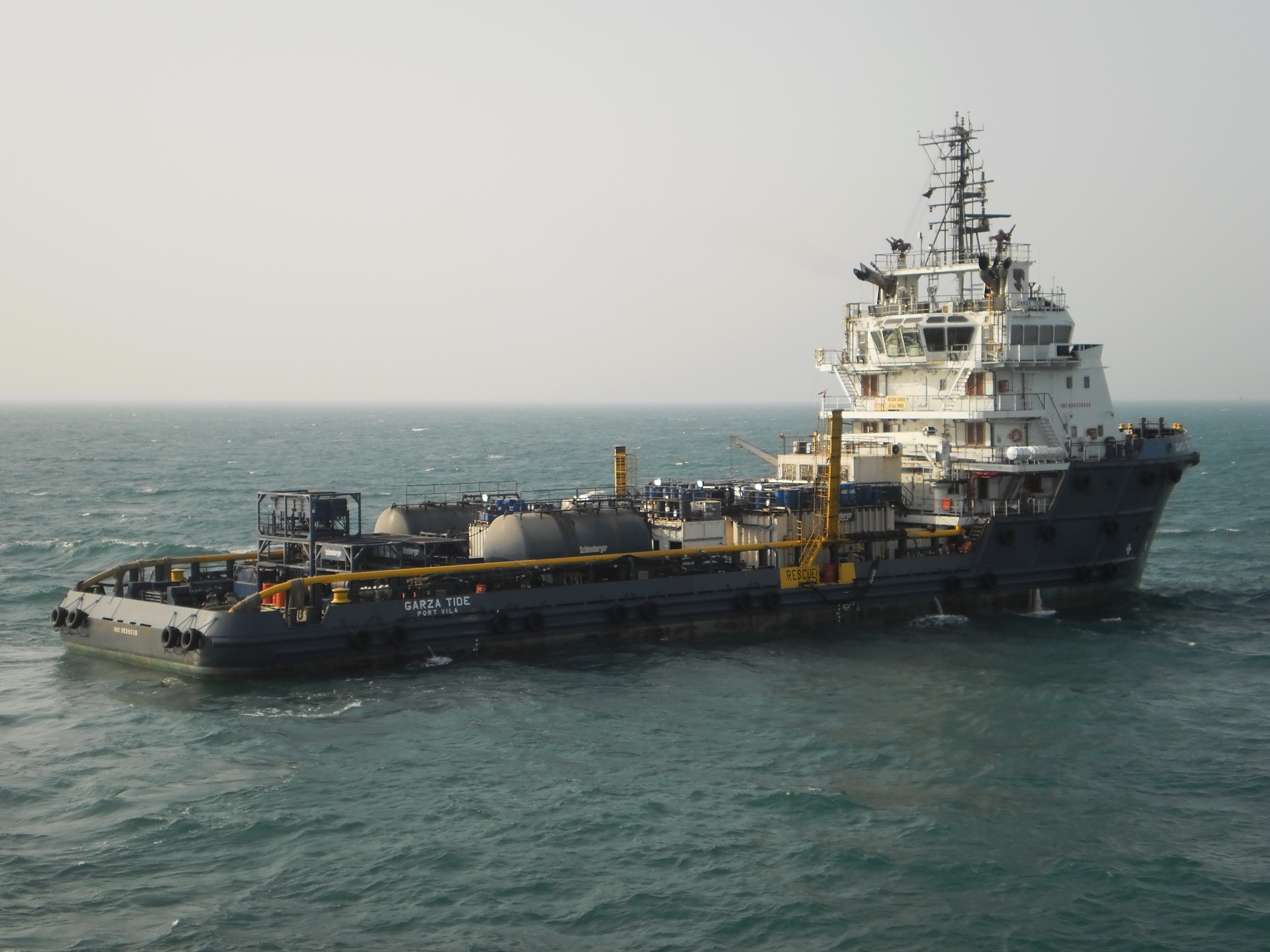
Garza Tide, one of the company vessels

Tidewater, Inc. is a publicly traded international petroleum service company headquartered in Houston, Texas, U.S. It operates a fleet of ships, primarily providing vessels and marine services to the offshore petroleum and offshore wind industries.

The company was founded in 1956 by a group of investors led by the Laborde family.

Tidewater created the "work boat" industry with its 1956 launch of the Ebb Tide, the world's first vessel tailor-made to support the offshore oil and gas industry. Tidewater is a leading provider of OSVs in the global energy industry.

Tidewater has a global footprint, with over 90% of its fleet working internationally in more than 60 countries. Around the world, Tidewater transports crews and supplies, tow and anchor mobile rigs, assists in offshore construction projects and performs a variety of specialized marine support services.

Quintin V. Kneen is the company's president, CEO & Director.

In 2017, the company filed for Chapter 11 bankruptcy protection.
