= CCGS Sir Humphrey Gilbert =

Icebreaker launched in 1959

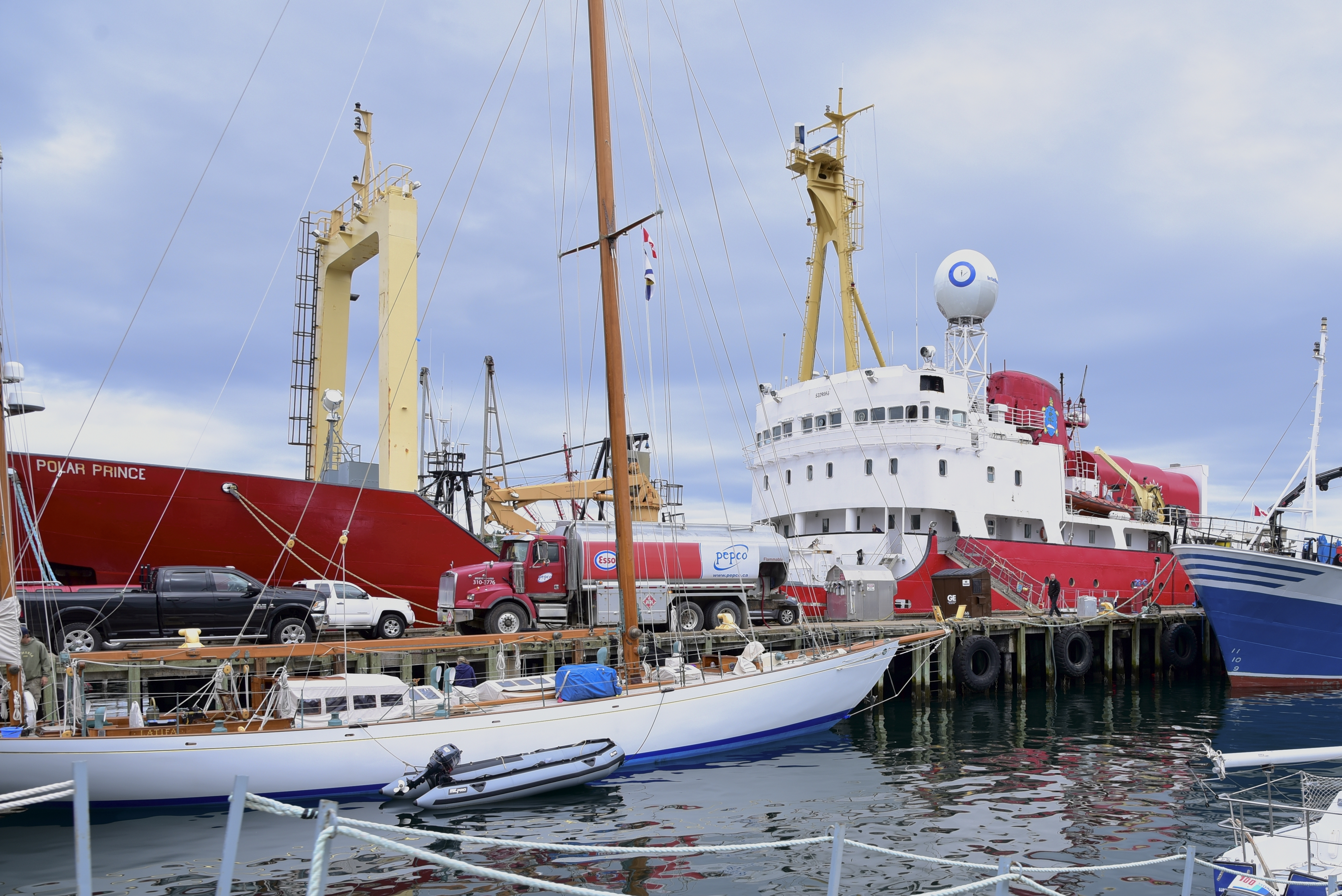
- As Polar Prince 2018

History

Canada
- Name: Sir Humphrey Gilbert
- Namesake: Sir Humphrey Gilbert, explorer
- Owner: Government of Canada
- Operator: Department of Transport Marine Service (1959–1962); Canadian Coast Guard (1962–2001)
- Port of registry: Ottawa
- Builder: Davie Shipbuilding, Lauzon
- Yard number: 614
- Launched: 29 October 1958
- Commissioned: June 1959
- Decommissioned: 2001
- Identification: IMO number: 5329566; MMSI number: 316006460; Call sign: CFK9552
- Fate: Sold for commercial use

History
- Name: Gilbert 1 (2002); Polar Prince (2002–present)
- Owner: Puddister Trading Co. (2002); Star Line Inc. (2002–2009); GX Technology Canada Ltd. (2009–2021); Miawpukek Horizon Maritime Service Ltd (2021–present)
- Port of registry: (Canada) Calgary (2009–2021); (Canada) St. John's (2021–present)
- In service: 2010–present
- Status: in active service

General characteristics (as built)
- Class & type: Light icebreaker and lighthouse and buoy tender
- Tonnage: 2,153 GRT; 693 NRT
- Displacement: 3,000 long tons (3,000 t)
- Length: 72.5 m (237 ft 10 in)
- Beam: 14.7 m (48 ft 3 in)
- Draught: 5 m (16 ft 5 in)
- Installed power: 4 × Fairbanks Morse 8-38D8-1/8 (4 × 1,279 hp)
- Propulsion: Diesel-electric (DC/DC); two shafts with fixed pitch propellers
- Speed: 14.5 knots (26.9 km/h; 16.7 mph)
- Range: 10,000 nmi (19,000 km; 12,000 mi) at 12 knots (22 km/h; 14 mph)
- Endurance: 30 days
- Aviation facilities: Helideck and telescopic hangar

CCGS Sir Humphrey Gilbert (Note: CCGS stands for Canadian Coast Guard Ship) is a former Canadian Coast Guard light icebreaker and buoy tender that was later sold to a private owner and renamed Polar Prince. The ship entered service with the Department of Transport Marine Service in 1959 and transferred to the newly created Canadian Coast Guard in 1962, active until 2001. The icebreaker was sold to private interests in Newfoundland and renamed Polar Prince, sitting mostly idle until resold in 2009 to GTX Technology Canada Limited for service in the Arctic Ocean as a commercial icebreaker. In 2017, the vessel was temporarily rechristened Canada C3 and used for a high-profile voyage around Canada's three maritime coasts as part of the nation's 150th anniversary. In November 2021, the ship was purchased by Miawpukek Horizon Maritime Service Ltd, a joint venture between Horizon Maritime and the Miawpukek First Nation and chartered for educational and research expedition use.

== Description ==
The icebreaker is 72.5 metres (237 ft 10 in) long overall with a beam of 14.7 m (48 ft 3 in) and a draught of 5 m (16 ft 5 in). The ship has a fully loaded displacement of 3,000 long tons (3,000 t) and a gross register tonnage (GRT) of 2,153 and 693 net register tons (NRT) as built. The vessel is powered by diesel-electric engines (DC/DC) driving two shafts turning fixed-pitch propellers creating 4,250 shaft horsepower (3,170 kW). This gives the vessel a maximum speed of 14.5 knots (26.9 km/h). The vessel can carry 467.00 m^{3} (102,730 imp gal) of diesel fuel and had a range of 10,000 nautical miles (19,000 km) at 12 knots (22 km/h) and could stay at sea for up to 30 days. The vessel was remeasured as 2,062 gross tonnage (GT) with a 618 net tonnage (NT) in 1985.

== Construction and career ==
=== Design and construction ===
The icebreaker was constructed by Davie Shipbuilding at their yard in Lauzon, Quebec, with the yard number 614. The ship was launched on 29 October 1958 and named after Humphrey Gilbert, an early explorer of the Northwest Passage. Sir Humphrey Gilbert was based on the proven design of the icebreakers CCGS Montcalm and CCGS Wolfe, but updated with diesel electric engines.

=== Government service ===
Sir Humphrey Gilbert was commissioned into the Department of Transport's Marine Service in June 1959. In 1962, all Marine Service icebreakers were transferred to the newly formed Canadian Coast Guard. The vessel was registered in Ottawa, Ontario and based for most of her career in Newfoundland and Labrador with a homeport at St. John's.

On 20 December 1963, the French vessel Douala transmitted a distress signal off the coast of Newfoundland. Sir Humphrey Gilbert had already been detailed to aid a fishing vessel in the Atlantic, but was redirected to Douala as the French ship was in danger of foundering. While heading to Douala a barge broke loose aboard the Coast Guard vessel, causing damage to the ship and it was some time before the barge could be secured due to icing conditions. The Coast Guard vessel was delayed in arriving on the scene by the barge and on 21 December, Douala sank. 19 crew members of Douala were rescued on 22 December, of which two died while returning to Newfoundland. 13 members of the crew died in the water.

In 1983, Sir Humphrey Gilbert became the test vessel for the Coast Guard's lay day crewing system. Under the lay day system, each ship has two crews which rotate on a 28-day interval. While on board the ship, the crew perform 12-hour work shifts, seven days a week. At the end of the 28-day interval, the crew rotates off the ship for a four-week break. The trials proved a success and the system was adopted fleet-wide.

Sir Humphrey Gilbert received a mid-life refit at the Halifax Shipyard in 1984 which significantly changed the ship. Her original bow was cut off and replaced with a new one with an air bubbler system to reduce friction when breaking ice. This added 5.5 metres (18 ft 1 in) to the ship's length. The bridge wings were enclosed and a large new derrick was installed forward.

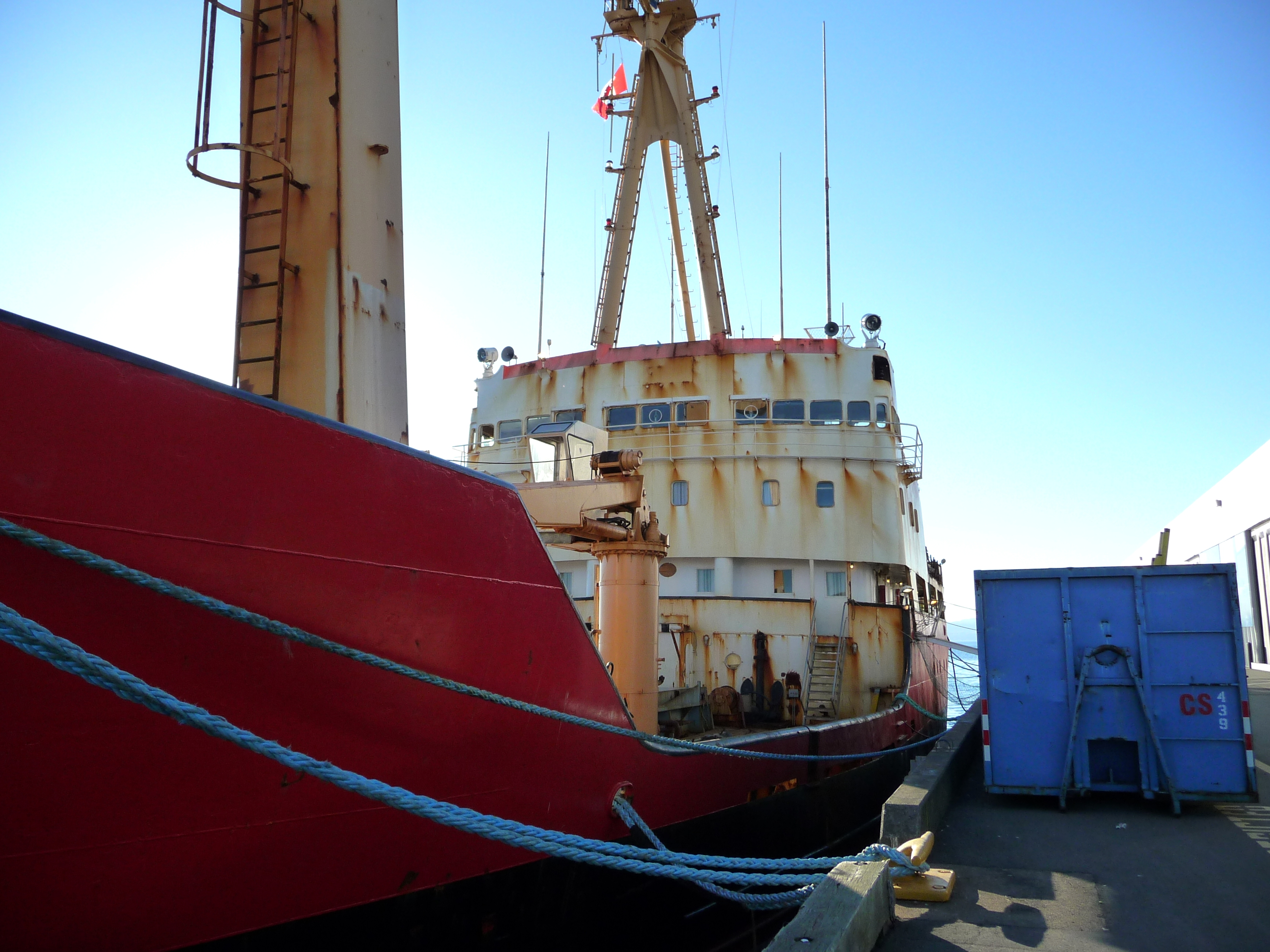
Polar Prince, 2010

=== Post-government service ===
The ship was taken out of service in 2001 and handed over to Crown Assets Distribution. The vessel was renamed 2001–06 in 2001 and in 2002 Gilbert 1.

==== Polar Prince ====
In 2002, the icebreaker was sold to Puddister Trading Co. Ltd of St. John's and renamed Polar Prince. In 2002, the vessel was acquired by Star Line Inc. In 2005, the vessel was laid up at Clarenville, Newfoundland and Labrador, and put up for sale by Star Line on eBay. The vessel was later sold to GX Technologies of Calgary, Alberta, in 2009 and modernized.

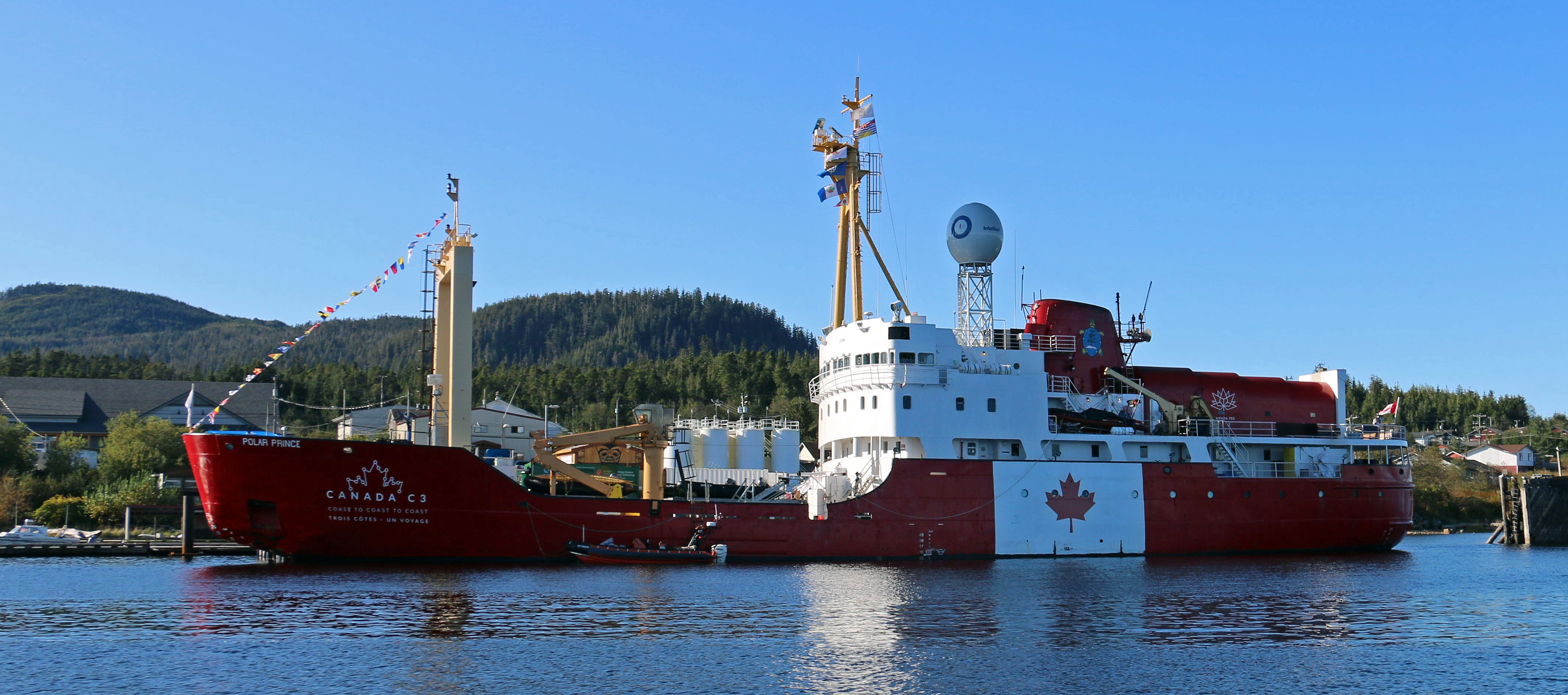
The ship as Canada C3, at Bella Bella, British Columbia in 2017

==== Canada C3 ====
In 2017, Polar Prince was chartered and (temporarily) rechristened Canada C3 for a high-profile summer-long, 15-leg cruise around Canada in celebration of Canada's 150th anniversary by Students on Ice. The ship departed on 1 July from Toronto, Ontario, and sailed down the Saint Lawrence Seaway and St. Lawrence River to Halifax, Nova Scotia, via the Northumberland Strait and the Canso Canal, then travelled north around Newfoundland, the Labrador coast, around Baffin Island and through the Northwest Passage, then around Alaska and down the Pacific coast through the Inside Passage, to Victoria, British Columbia. The journey lasted 150 days and included stops at numerous Indigenous communities along the way.

==== 2021 new ownership ====
In November 2021 the ship was purchased by Miawpukek Horizon Maritime Service Ltd, a joint venture between the Miawpukek First Nation and Horizon Maritime, a company that has trained Indigenous cadets as seafarers for offshore supply vessels. The new owners chartered the ship to SOI Foundation for expedition use for education, research and ocean conservation. The ship's name has been translated to Oqwatnukewey Eleke'wi'ji'jit in Mi'kmaq.

==== Titan submersible implosion ====
In June 2023, Polar Prince was chartered by OceanGate, Inc. for a tourist mission to the wreck of Titanic. Communications were lost with the detached deep submergence vehicle Titan on 18 June 2023. Search and rescue operations commenced on 19 June. Wreckage from the submersible was found on 22 June, confirming the five passengers were dead. Only remains of the victims were recovered. The Canadian Transportation Safety Board boarded the ship as soon as it returned to St. John's to interview crew members and recover data logs. Polar Prince was released from the investigation and returned to its owners later in 2023, resuming training operations based out of Stephenville, Newfoundland by January 2024.
