= Platform supply vessel =

Ship used to supply offshore platforms

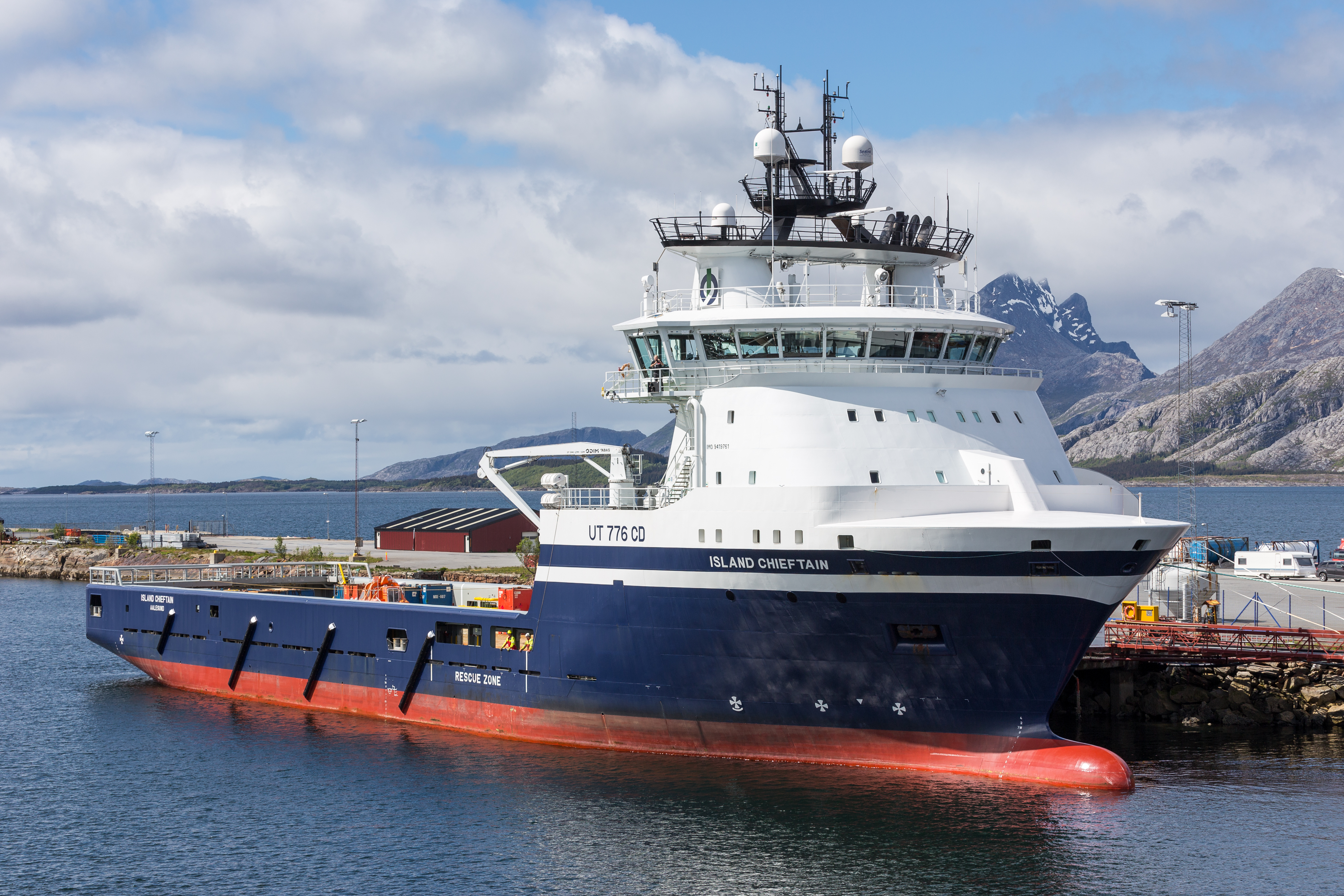
Offshore platform supply vessel, Island Chieftain

A platform supply vessel (PSV) is a ship specially designed to supply offshore oil and gas platforms and other offshore installations. They typically range from 50 to 100 metres (160 to 330 ft) in length and are distinguished by the large open deck area used to store supplies and house equipment and to allow for efficient loading and offloading. The primary function for most of these vessels is logistic support and transportation of goods, tools, equipment, and personnel to and from their destination.

They belong to the broad category of offshore vessels (OSVs) which includes Service Operation Vessels (SOVs), Construction Support Vessels (CSVs), well stimulation vessels (WSVs) and anchor handling tug supply vessels (AHTSVs).

== Capabilities ==
=== Cargo ===
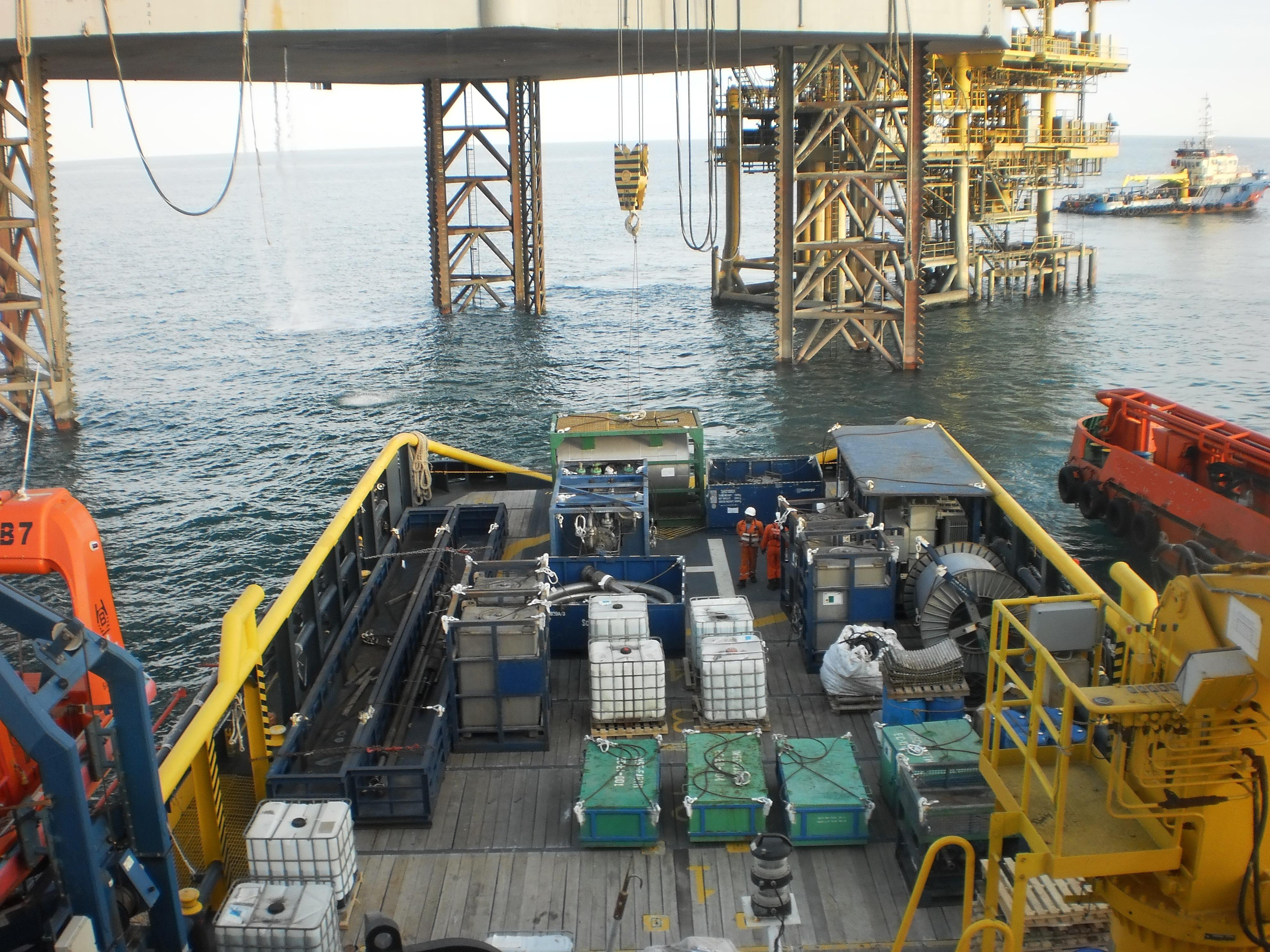
Deck cargo of an offshore supply vessel

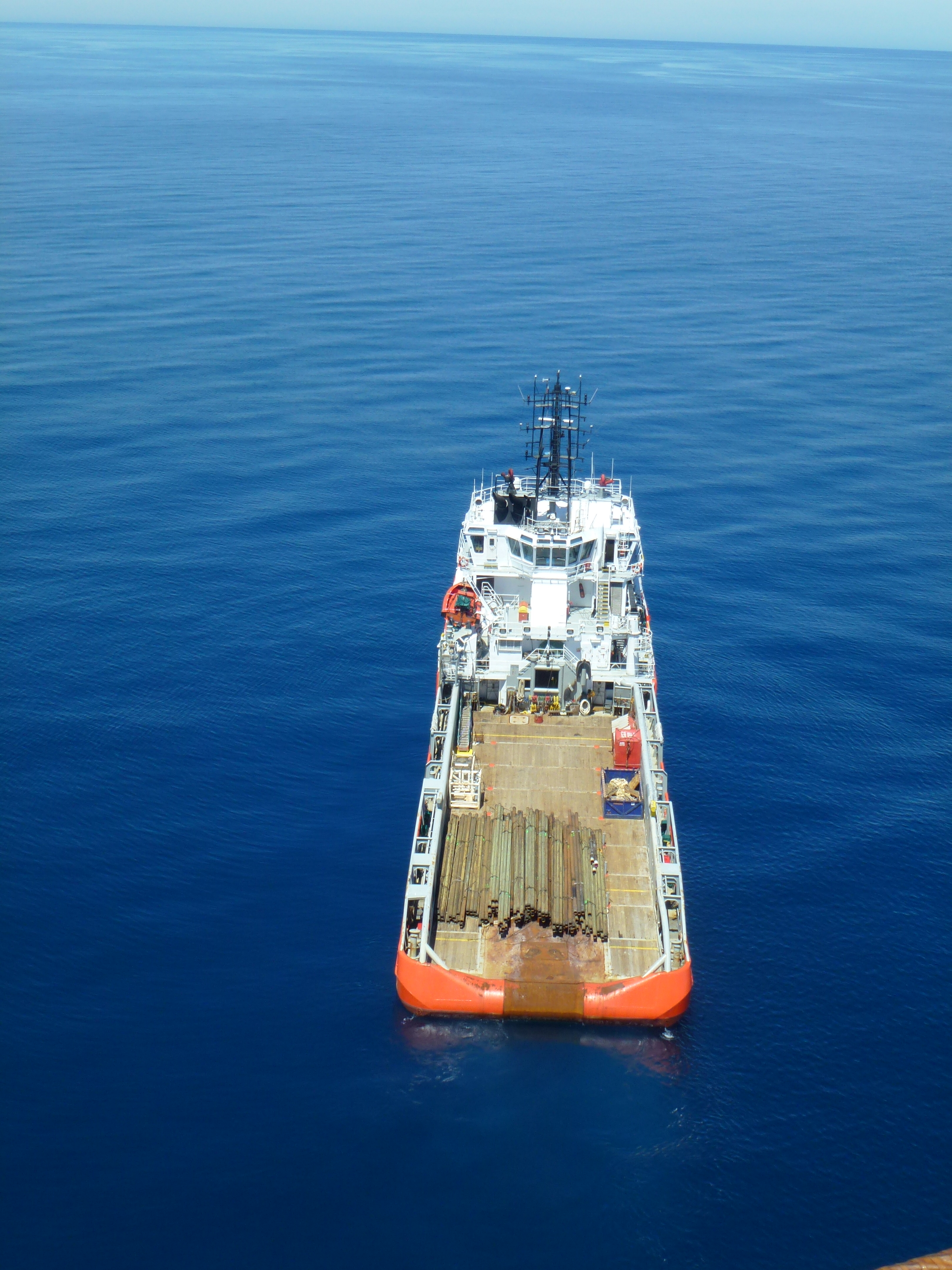
An offshore support vessel delivers drill pipe to a drilling rig

A primary function of a platform supply vessel is to transport supplies to the oil platform and return other cargoes to shore. Cargo tanks for drilling mud, pulverized cement, diesel fuel, potable and non-potable water, and chemicals used in the drilling process comprise the bulk of the cargo spaces. Fuel, water, and chemicals are almost always required by oil platforms. Certain other chemicals must be returned to shore for proper recycling or disposal, however, crude oil product from the rig is usually not a supply vessel cargo.

=== Dynamic positioning ===
Dynamic positioning (DP) is a computerised system which allows vessels to maintain a certain position or heading by controlling the thrust produced by the vessel's thrusters and propellers. As with most offshore vessels, DP is of critical importance to ensure that the vessel's position is maintained whilst loading or offloading is taking place; this is especially needed for locations with frequent severe weather conditions such as the North Sea.

A typical DP set-up for a PSV is two thrusters located at the bow of the vessel which can be supplemented by two azimuth thrusters or Voith Schneider Propellers located at the stern. All modern PSVs are DP2 rated, meaning that there are two levels of redundancy in the DP system.

=== Support ===
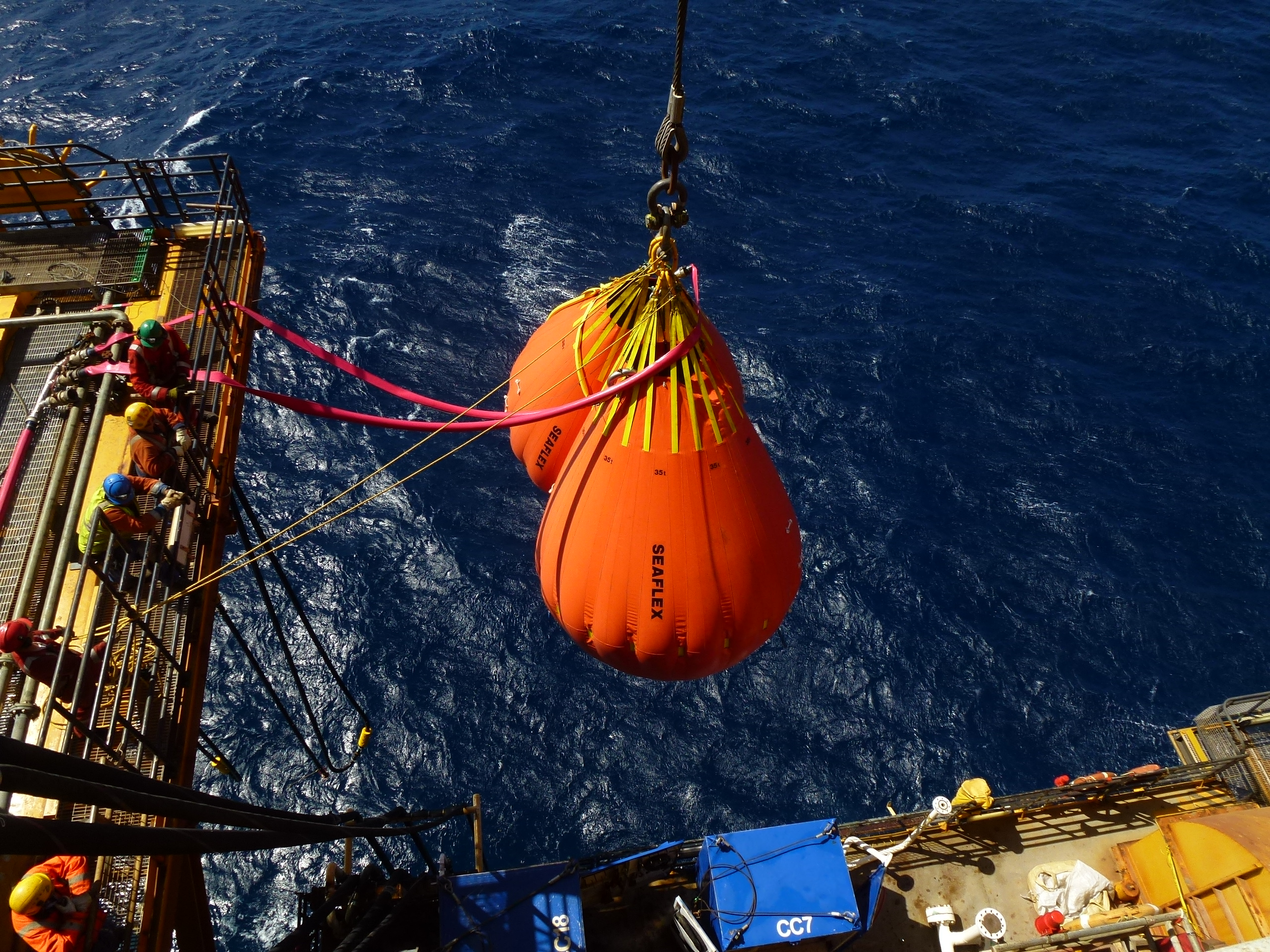
Heavy-lift load testing on an offshore support vessel

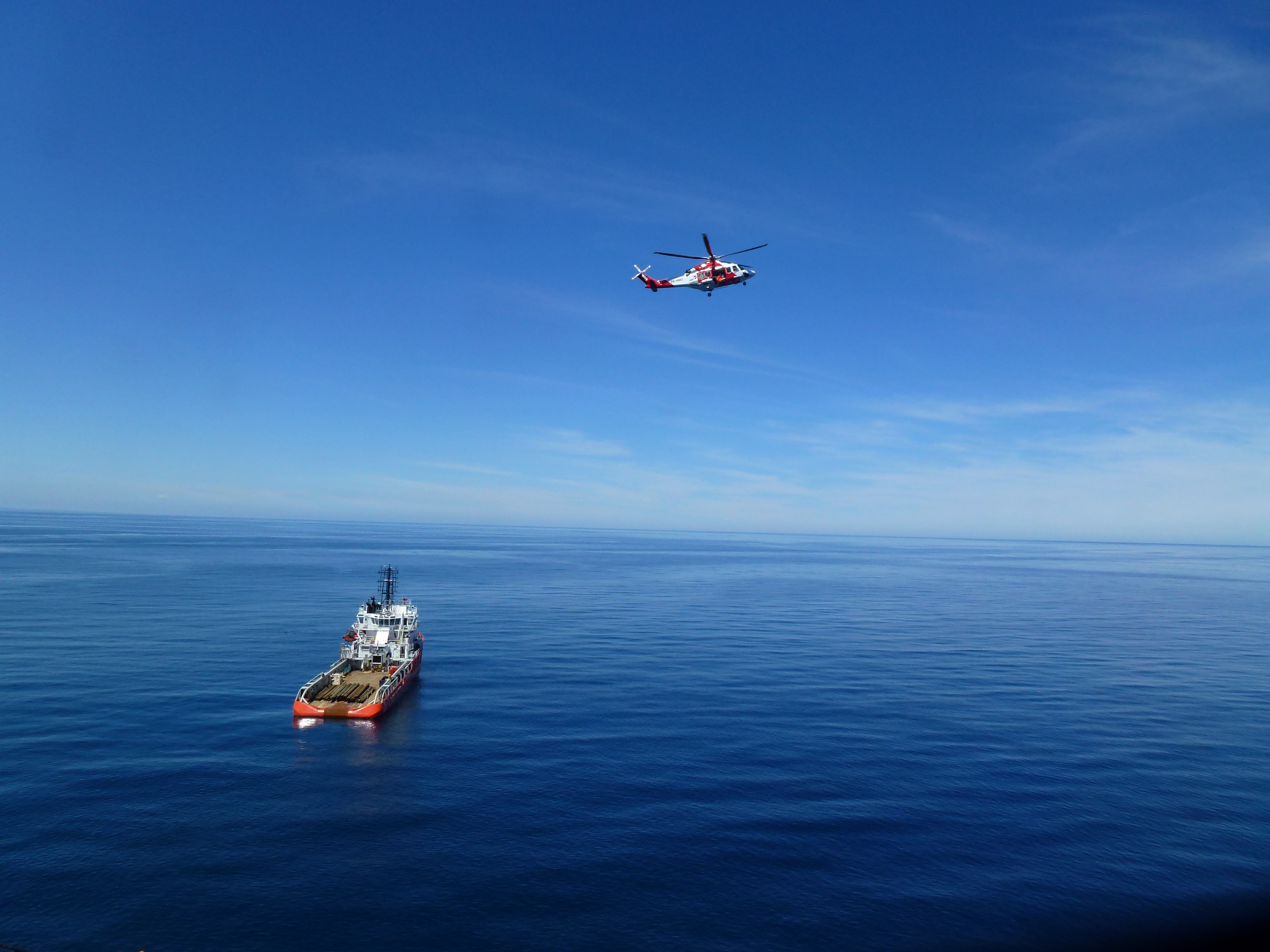
Helicopter and supply vessel during offshore support transfer

Common and specialty tools are carried on the large decks of these vessels. Most carry a combination of deck cargoes and bulk cargo in tanks below deck. Many ships are constructed (or re-fitted) to accomplish a particular job. Some of these vessels are equipped with a firefighting capability and fire monitors for fighting platform fires. Some vessels are equipped with oil containment and recovery equipment to assist in the cleanup of a spill at sea. Equipment for receiving drill cuttings may also be installed on deck.

== Vessel types ==
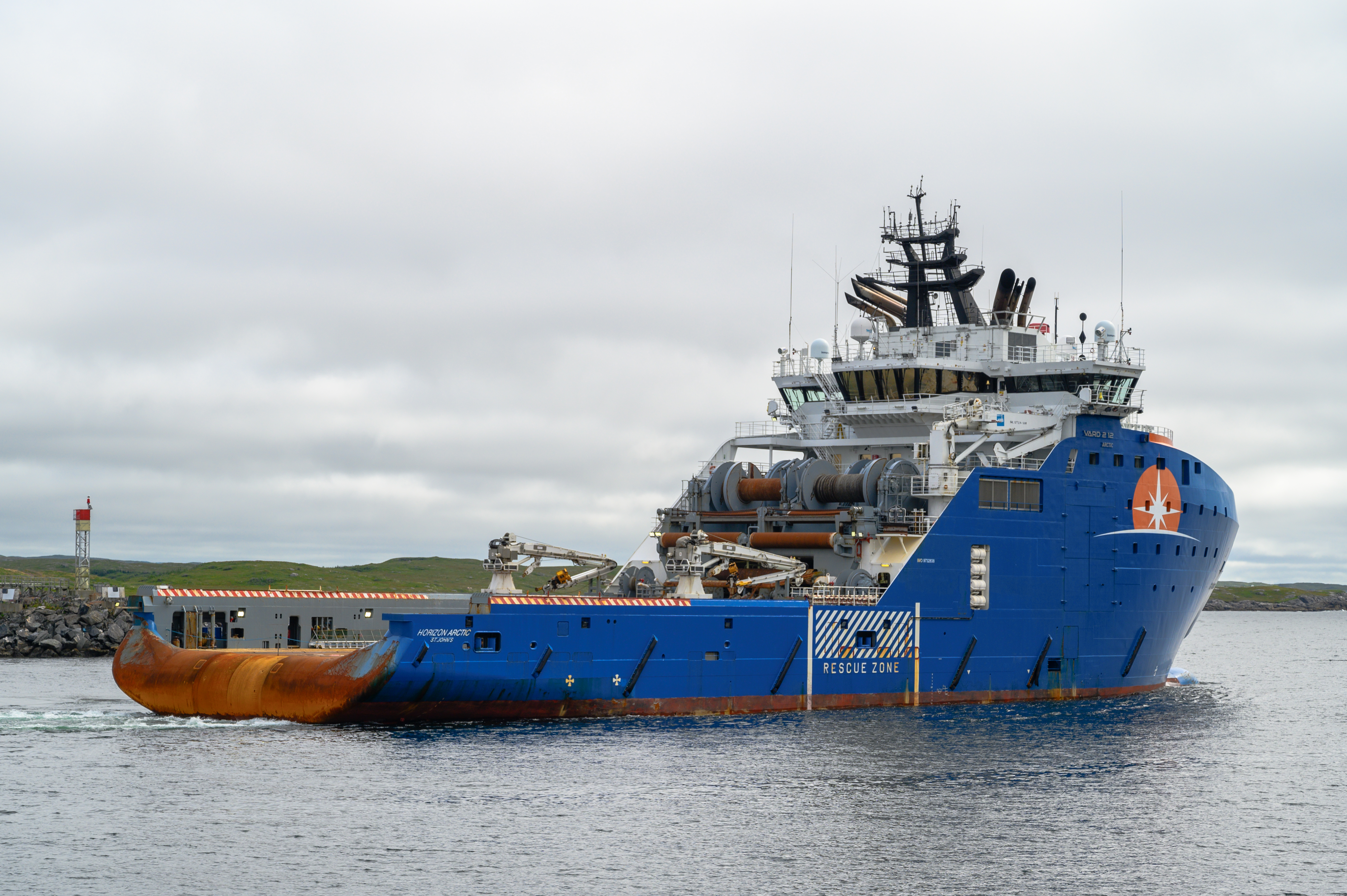
Anchor Handling Tug Supply (AHTS) vessel, Horizon Arctic, with winches and open stern suitable for anchoring offshore platforms

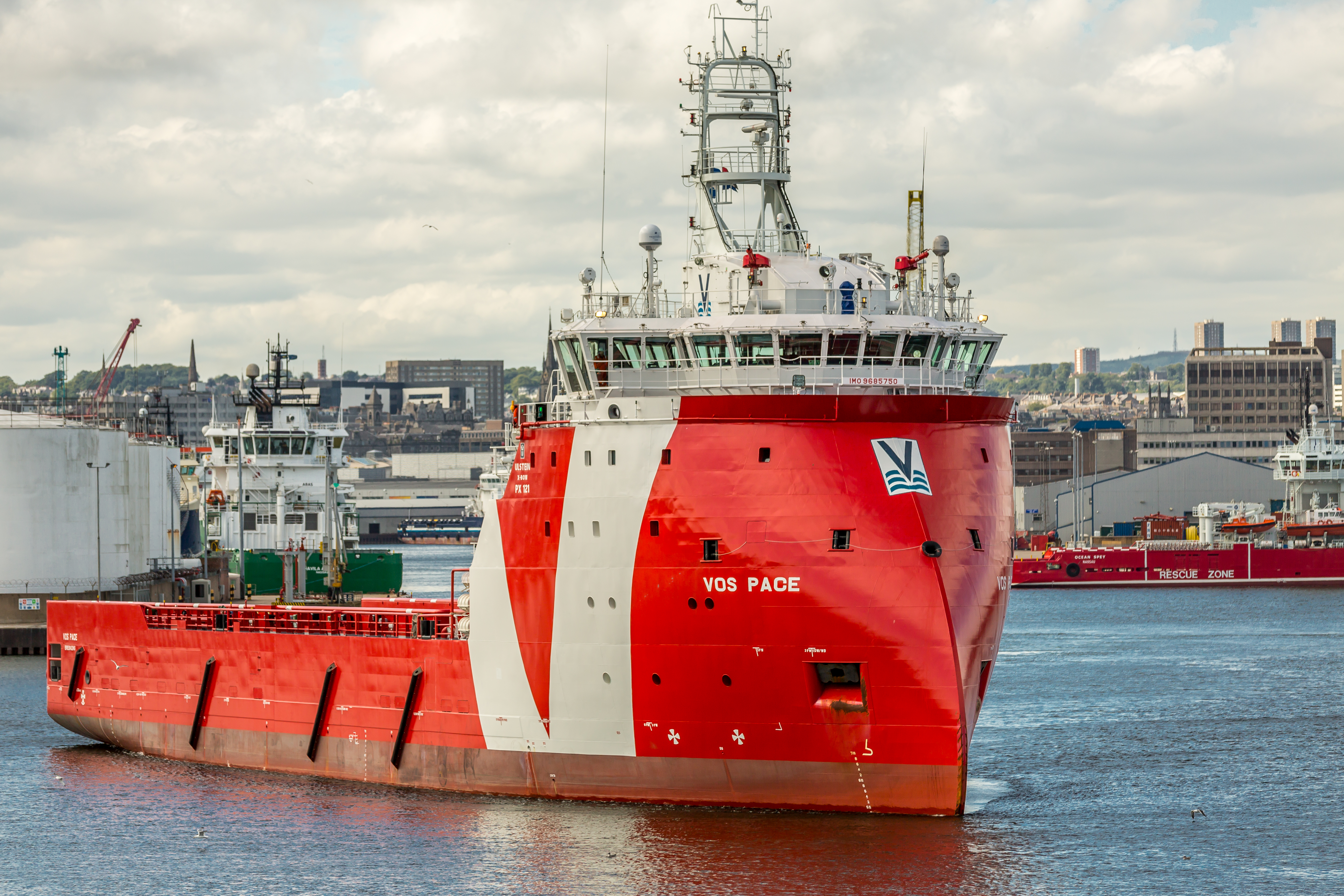
VOS Pace, note the inverted bow

- Anchor handling tugs supply (AHTS): Similar to PSV, they can anchor and tow floating oil platforms (jack-ups and semi-submersible ones)
- Multi purpose supply vessels (MPSV): Universal vessels able to provide a large variety of maintenance services. They are most of the time equipped with a high capacity crane (100 tons or more).
- Fast Supply Intervention Vessels (FSIV): High-speed ships, (approximately 25 knots, 46 km/h, 29 mph) with a smaller deck capacity used for urgent deliveries or small shipments.

== Vessel crews ==
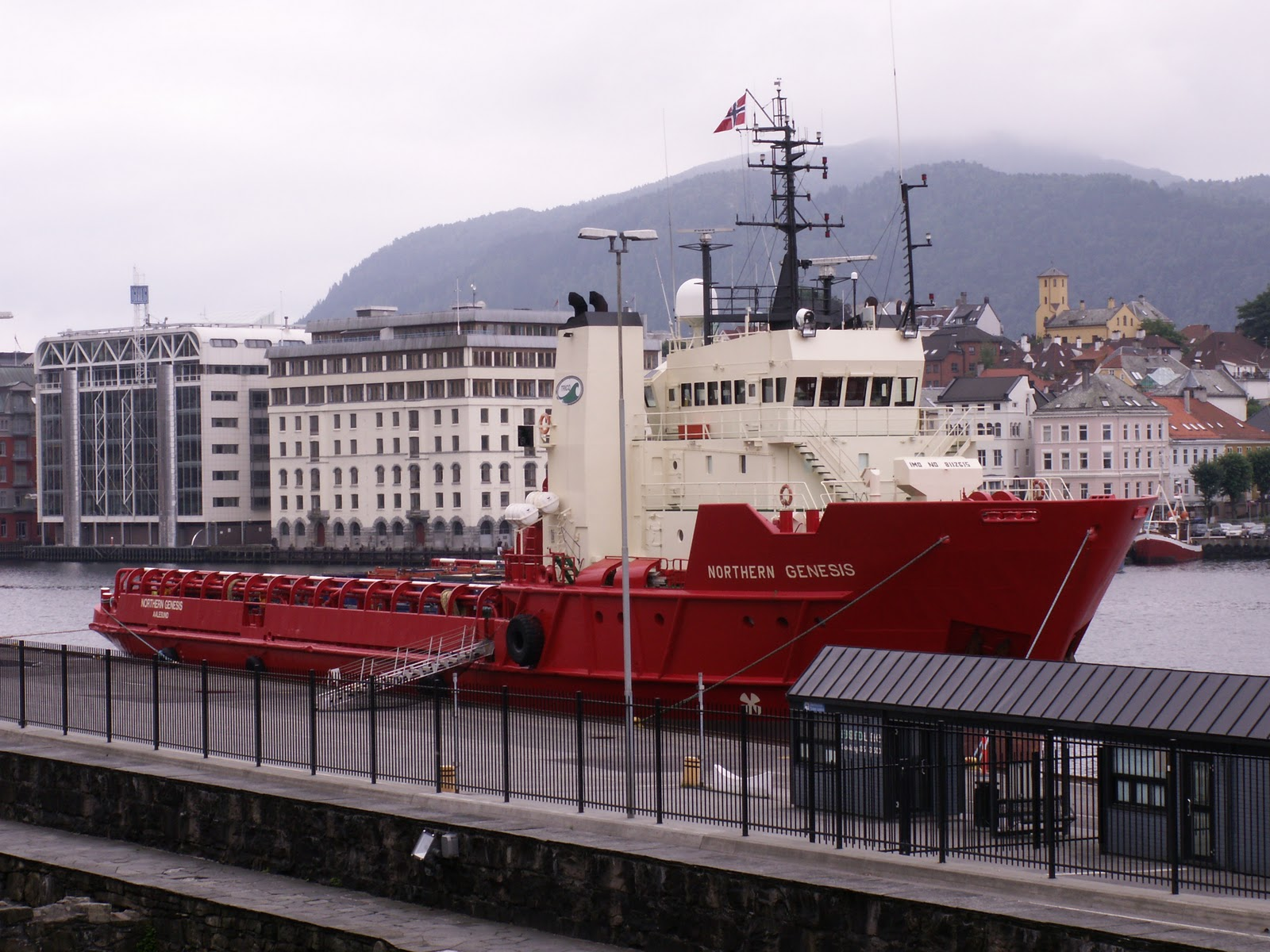
The Norwegian PSV Northern Genesis in Bergen harbour

Crew on these ships can number up to 50 crew members, depending on vessel size and working requirements. One example of a crew size of 13 consists of 4 deck officers (including Captain) working shifts in pairs, 4 Able Seamen working in pairs, 3 Engineers, 1 ETO (Electro-Technical Officer), and 1 Steward. The crew may also include Cadets.

=== Daily operations ===
Crews sign on to work and live aboard the ship an extended period of time, this is followed by similar period of time off. Depending on the ship's owner or operator the time aboard varies from 1 to 3 months with 1 month off. Work details on platform supply vessels, like many ships, are organized into shifts of up to 12 hours.

Living aboard the ship, each crew member and worker will have at least a 12-hour shift, lasting some portion of a 24-hour day. Supply vessels are provided with a "bridge" area for navigating and operating the ship, machinery spaces, living quarters, and galley and mess room. Some have built-in work areas and common areas for entertainment. The large main deck area is sometimes utilized for portable housing.

Living quarters consist of cabins, lockers, offices, and spaces for storing personal items. Living areas are provided with wash basins, showers, and toilets.

The galley or cooking and eating areas aboard ship will be stocked with enough grocery items to last for the intended voyage but with the ability also to store provisions for months if required. A walk-in size cooler and freezer, a commercial stove and oven, deep sinks, storage and counter space will be available for the persons doing the cooking. The eating area will have coffee makers, toasters, microwave ovens, cafeteria-style seating, and other amenities needed to feed a hard-working crew.

== See also ==
- Anchor handling tug supply vessel
- Ebb Tide— an example of an early PSV design
- Yacht support vessel
